= Platt, Austria =

Platt
- Village of Zellerndorf
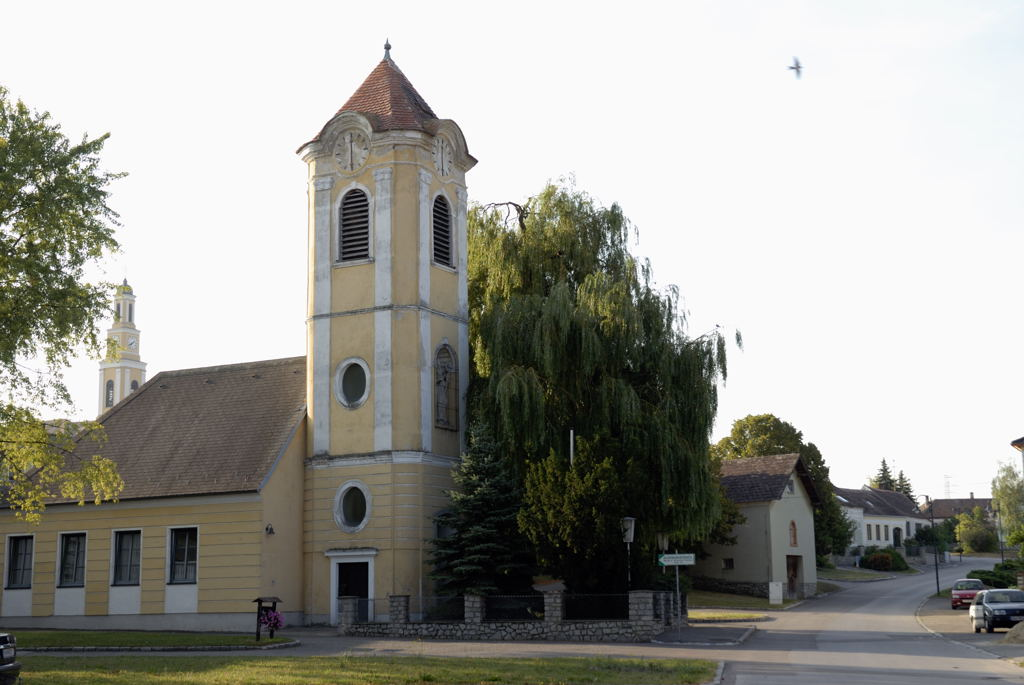
- The preserved tower of Platt's old parish church. The new church is visible in the background on the left

- Location within Austria
- Coordinates: 48°40′N 15°58′E
- Country: Austria
- State: Lower Austria
- District: Hollabrunn

Area
  - Total: 0.26 km^{2} (0.10 sq mi)
- Elevation: 340 m (1,120 ft)

Population (01.01.2001)
  - Total: 440
  - Density: 1,700/km^{2} (4,400/sq mi)
- Time zone: UTC+1 (CET)
  - Summer (DST): UTC+2 (CEST)
- Postal code: A-2051
- Area code: +43 2945

Platt is a village in the Zellerndorf administrative community in the district of Hollabrunn, Lower Austria, in northeast Austria. It is notable for its position on the Diendorf fault line and for its immediate vicinity to the site of one of the most significant Celtic settlements in Central Europe, situated on the southern slopes of the nearby Sandberg ridge towards the neighboring village of Roseldorf.

== History ==
The Platt area shows signs of human habitation that date back to late neolithic (Funnelbeaker culture) and early Bronze Age (Unetice culture) times. Prehistoric culture reached its peak during the early and middle La Tène period, around 300 B.C., when the large (20-40 ha) Sandberg Celtic city existed here on the southern slopes of the nearby Sandberg ridge. Systematic archaeological excavations that have been ongoing since 2001 continue to reveal information on this recently recognized and highly significant settlement from the Iron Age, which at its climax comprised at least 450 buildings and included a halidom district with several cult sites.

The village of Platt was first documented in 1185 (as Plade), and grew from 56 buildings in 1590 to 187 in 1850, when the population reached 1,202 and the village became an independent administrative community. From this time onward the headcount dropped continually, reaching a minimum of 398 in 1991 and rising only marginally as a result of weekend residences being built, mainly by citizens of Vienna which is about 75 kilometres (47 mi) away to the southeast. In 1967, the local administration of Platt was moved to Zellerndorf.

Only the tower, strongly modified in the 18th century, is left from Platt's original parish church, which was dedicated to St. Ulrich and traces back to a chapel erected between 1430 and 1440. The much larger new church was completed in 1850. It contains two oil paintings by Paul Troger, a famous artist from the Baroque period.

The first decades of the 19th century were an unfortunate time for Platt. The village burned twice (in 1811 and again in 1827), followed by a cholera epidemic in 1832.

== The Diendorf fault line and the vanished castle ==
Platt is situated on one of the most active segments of the Diendorf fault, a geological disturbance traversing Lower Austria from Wieselburg and Melk to Mautern, Krems and Maissau, then continues northward towards the Czech border. Its movements do not primarily result in earthquakes but rather in the slow but constant formation of subterranean clefts and cavities which destabilize the ground and cause significant damage even to major buildings with strong foundations. Occasionally large cavities collapse and take entire surface structures down with them, as happened with parts of a vineyard in 1942. This might be the reason for the unexplained disappearance of a building of local significance (sometimes referred to as a castle) which was independently documented by several sources in the early 17th century but was gone by the 1670s, apparently without leaving permanent traces. It has been suggested that the building became a victim of the Diendorf fault, but it is also possible that it was destroyed by invading Swedish troops during the final phase of the Thirty Years' War: in 1645, the headquarters for Swedish army operations in Lower Austria had been established in the immediate vicinity, at the castle of Schrattenthal.

== Economy and infrastructure ==
Platt's economy is essentially agricultural, mostly based on wine, but recently significant areas have been dedicated to pumpkins (the Styrian variety cultivated for their highly valued seed oil) and sunflowers. The second most important element is tourism.

There is a direct and well-served train connection linking Platt to Austria's capital, Vienna and to Znojmo immediately across the Czech border. Bus connections are available to Retz.
