= Zellerndorf =

- Municipality
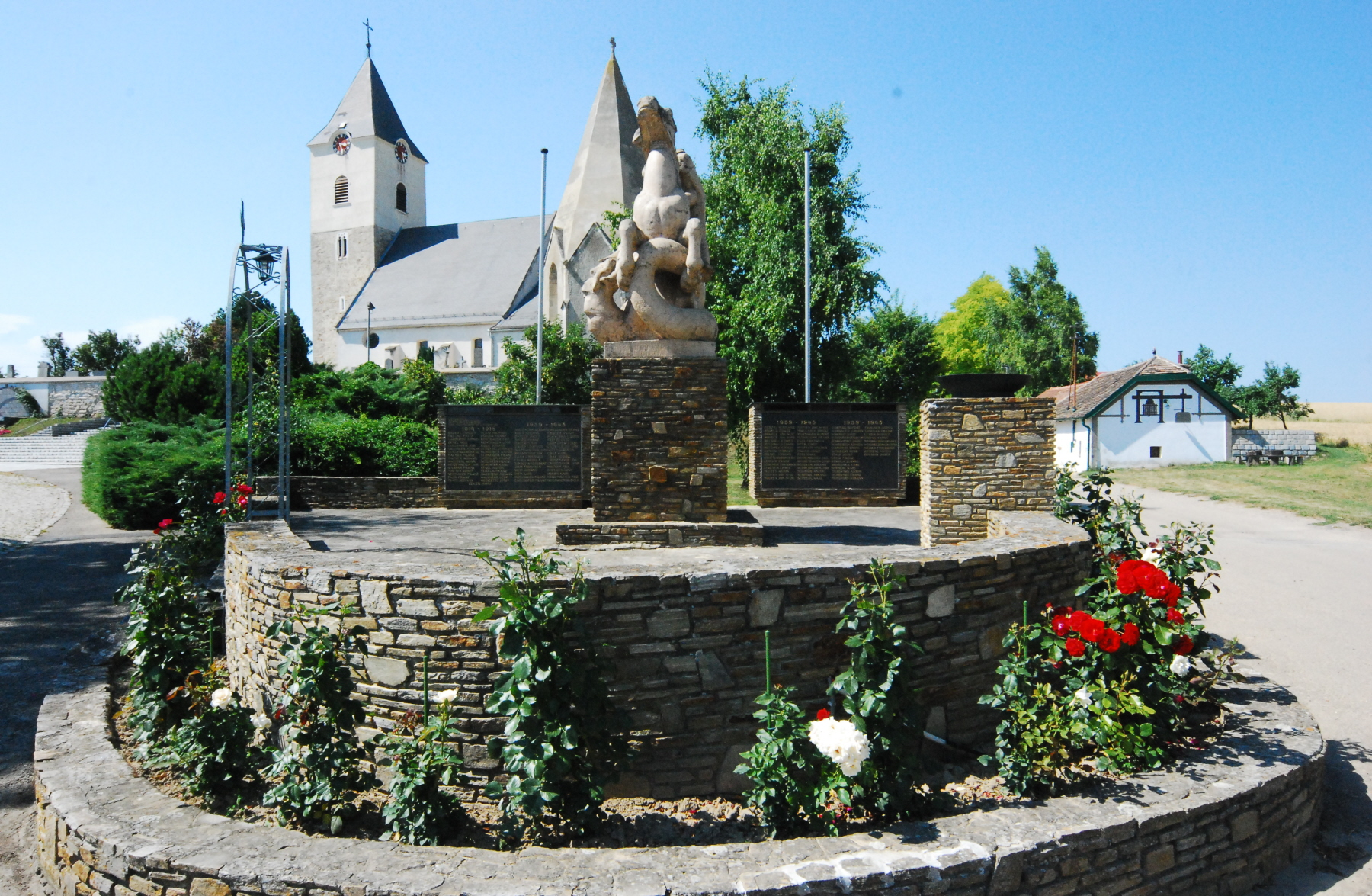

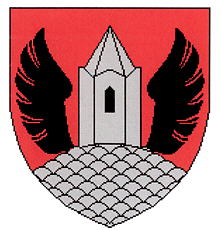
- Coat of arms

- Location within Austria
- Coordinates: 48°42′N 15°57′E
- Country: Austria
- State: Lower Austria
- District: Hollabrunn

Government
  - Mayor: Markus Baier

Area
  - Total: 41.16 km^{2} (15.89 sq mi)
- Elevation: 260 m (850 ft)

Population (2018-01-01)
  - Total: 2,432
  - Density: 59.09/km^{2} (153.0/sq mi)
- Time zone: UTC+1 (CET)
  - Summer (DST): UTC+2 (CEST)
- Postal code: 2051
- Area code: 02945
- Website: www.zellerndorf.gv.at

Zellerndorf is a town in the district of Hollabrunn in Lower Austria, Austria.

== Geography ==
Zellerndorf lies in the Weinviertel in Lower Austria near Retz and Pulkau. Only about 1.47 percent of the municipality is forested.
