= Retzbach =

- Municipality
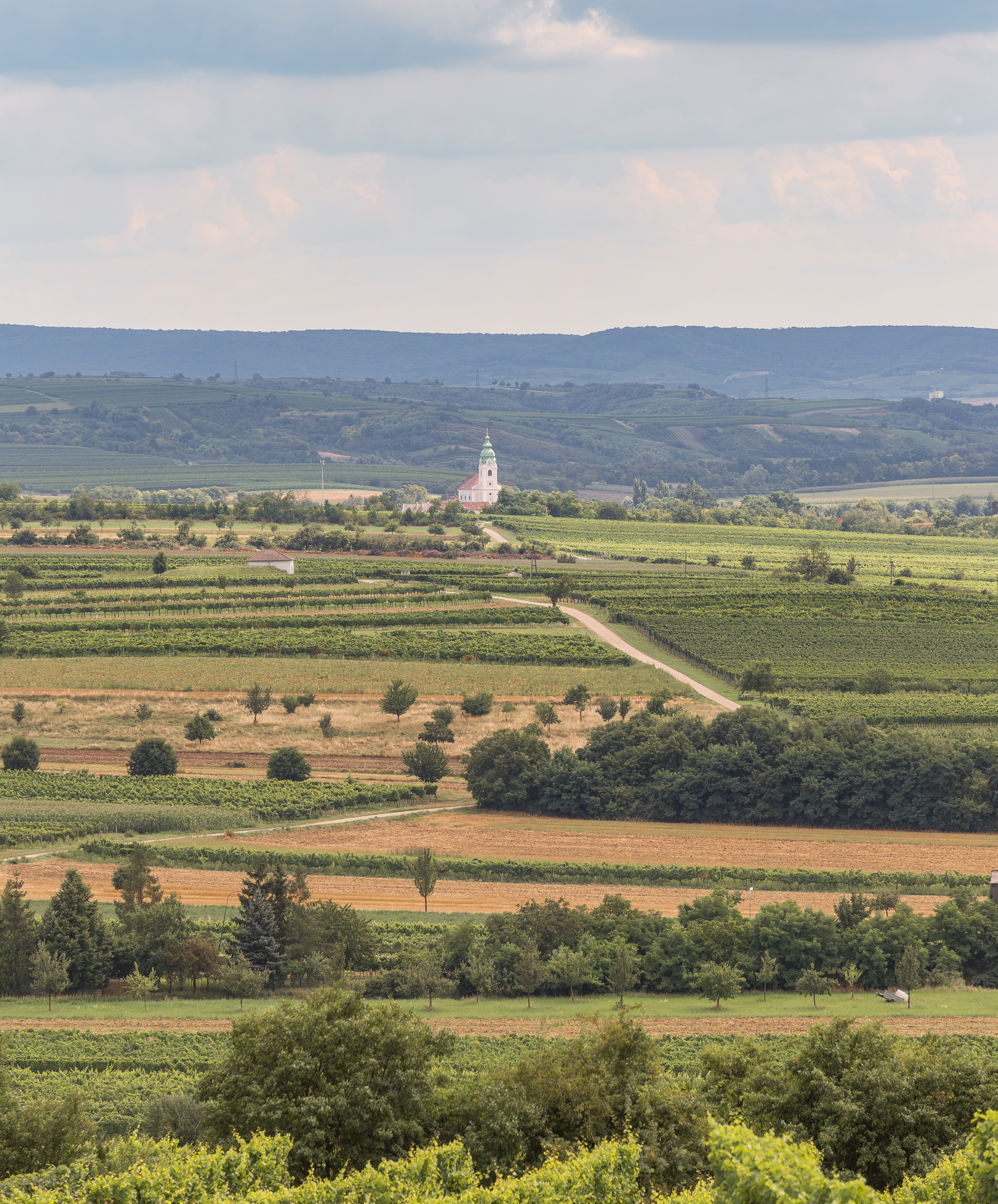
- Remote view of Unterretzbach and parish church

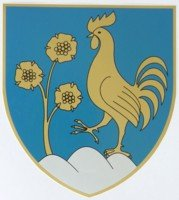
- Coat of arms

- Location within Austria
- Coordinates: 48°46′N 15°59′E
- Country: Austria
- State: Lower Austria
- District: Hollabrunn

Government
  - Mayor: Manfred Nigl

Area
  - Total: 18.15 km^{2} (7.01 sq mi)
- Elevation: 243 m (797 ft)

Population (2018-01-01)
  - Total: 1,002
  - Density: 55.21/km^{2} (143.0/sq mi)
- Time zone: UTC+1 (CET)
  - Summer (DST): UTC+2 (CEST)
- Postal code: 2070
- Area code: 02942
- Website: www.retzbach.gv.at

Retzbach is a town in the district of Hollabrunn in Lower Austria, Austria.

== Geography ==
Retzbach lies in the Weinviertel in Lower Austria. About 6.34 percent of the municipality is forested.
