= Pernersdorf =

- Municipality
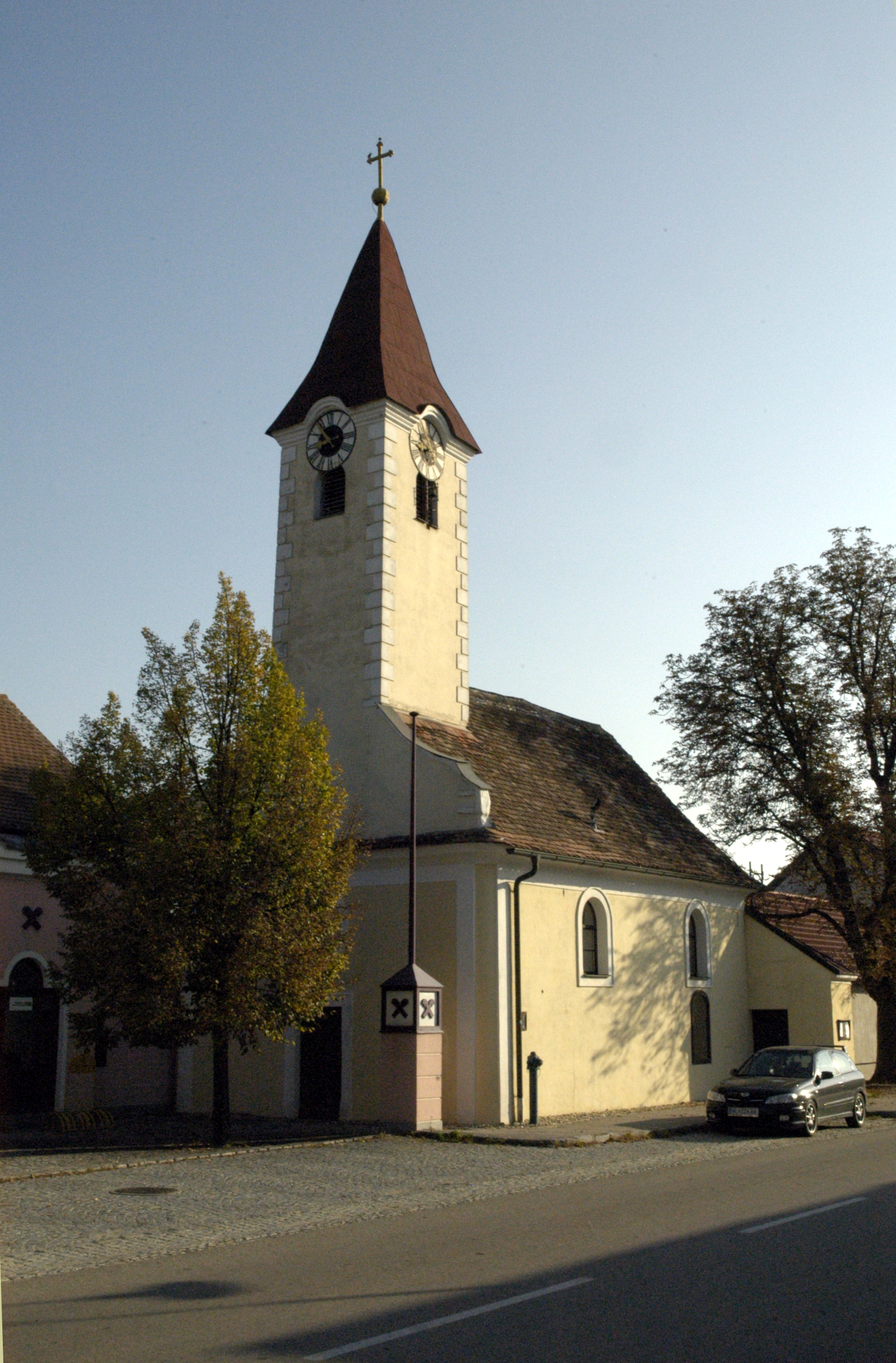
- Pernersdorf chapel

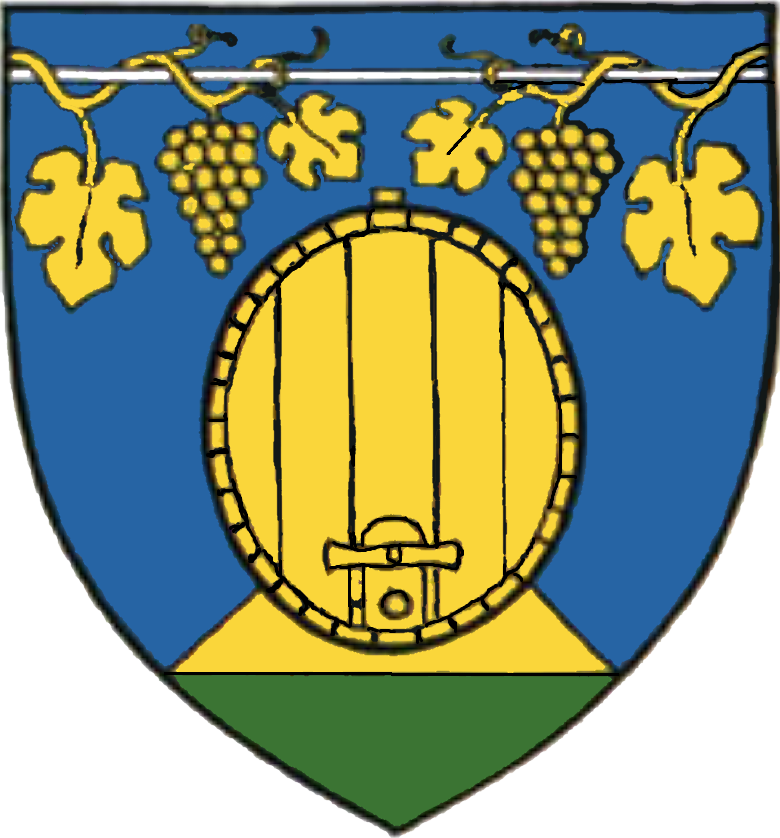
- Coat of arms

- Location within Austria
- Coordinates: 48°42′N 16°1′E
- Country: Austria
- State: Lower Austria
- District: Hollabrunn

Government
  - Mayor: Eduard Kosch

Area
  - Total: 25.84 km^{2} (9.98 sq mi)
- Elevation: 214 m (702 ft)

Population (2018-01-01)
  - Total: 1,022
  - Density: 39.55/km^{2} (102.4/sq mi)
- Time zone: UTC+1 (CET)
  - Summer (DST): UTC+2 (CEST)
- Postal code: 2052
- Area code: 02944
- Website: www.pernersdorf.gv.at

Pernersdorf is a town in the district of Hollabrunn in Lower Austria, Austria.

== Geography ==
Pernersdorf lies in the Weinviertel in Lower Austria. Only about 1.06 percent of the municipality is forested.
