= Seefeld-Kadolz =

- Municipality
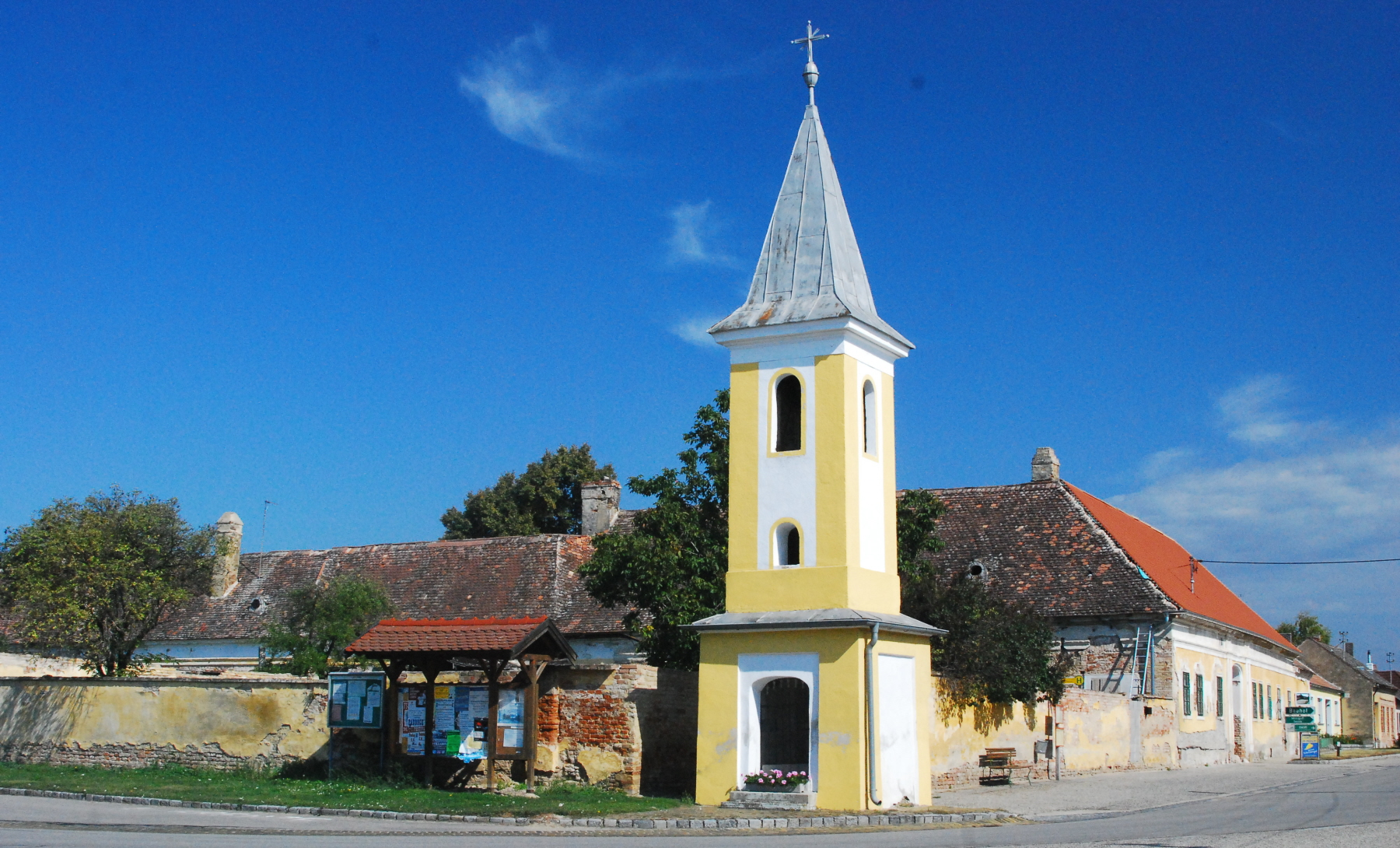
- Belfry in Grosskadolz

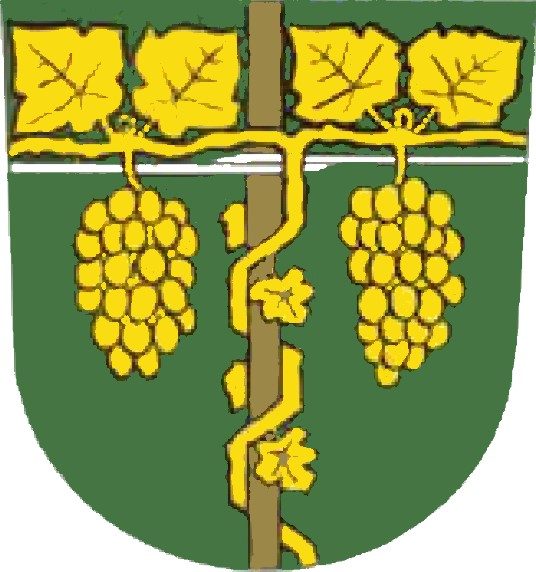
- Coat of arms

- Location within Austria
- Coordinates: 48°43′N 16°10′E
- Country: Austria
- State: Lower Austria
- District: Hollabrunn

Government
  - Mayor: Georg Jungmayer

Area
  - Total: 21.85 km^{2} (8.44 sq mi)
- Elevation: 192 m (630 ft)

Population (2018-01-01)
  - Total: 935
  - Density: 42.8/km^{2} (111/sq mi)
- Time zone: UTC+1 (CET)
  - Summer (DST): UTC+2 (CEST)
- Postal code: 2062
- Area code: 02943
- Website: www.seefeld-kadolz.at

Seefeld-Kadolz is a town in the district of Hollabrunn in Lower Austria, Austria.

== Geography ==
Seefeld-Kadolz lies in the Weinviertel in Lower Austria in the Pulkau valley. About 4.72 percent of the municipality is forested.
