= Göllersdorf =

- Municipality
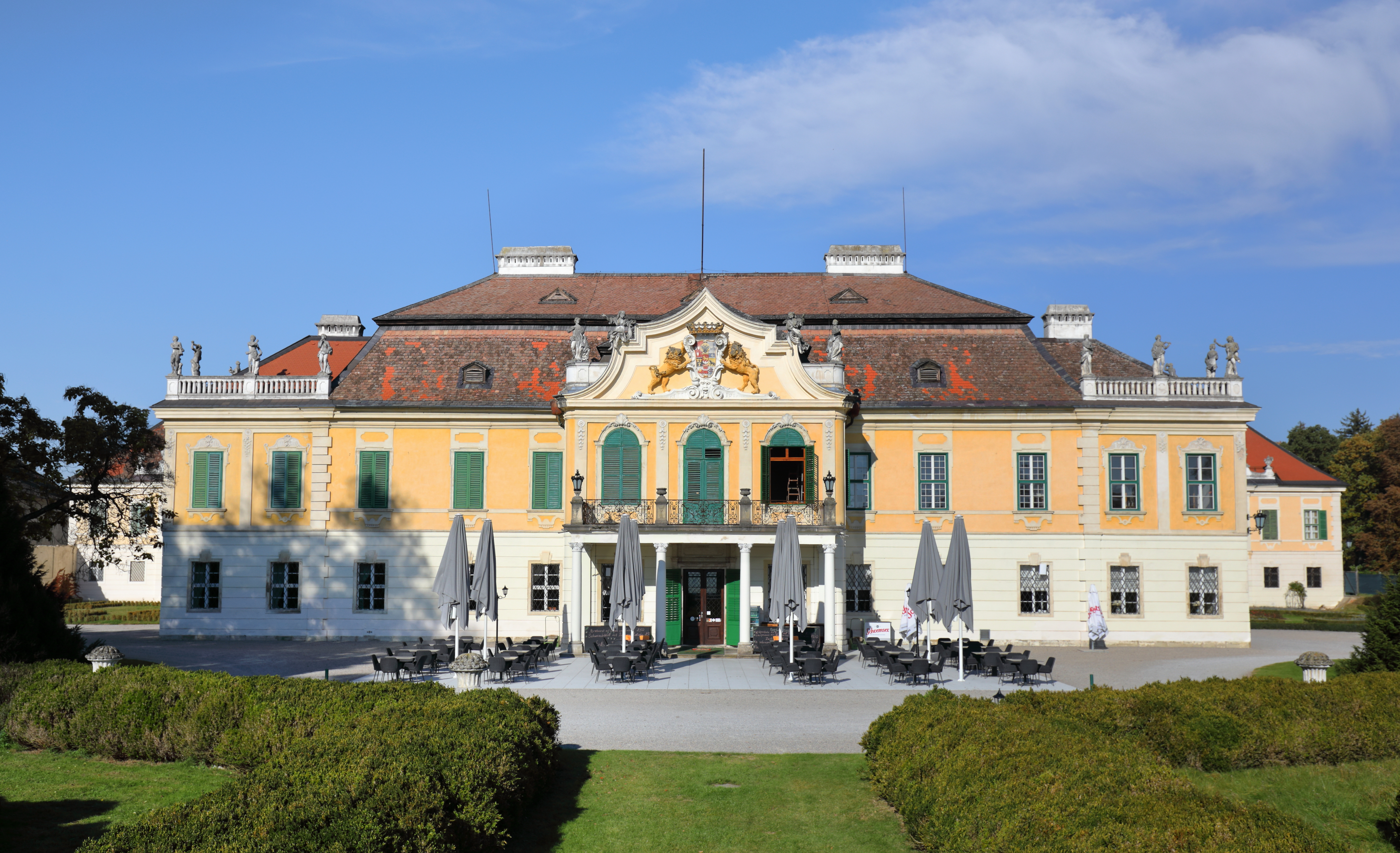
- Schloss Schönborn (since 1710 owned by the House of Schönborn-Buchheim)

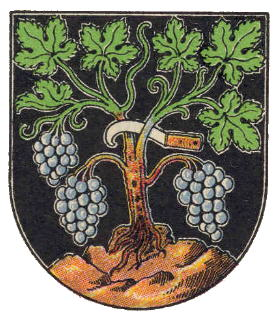
- Coat of arms

- Location within Austria
- Coordinates: 48°29′N 16°7′E
- Country: Austria
- State: Lower Austria
- District: Hollabrunn

Government
  - Mayor: Josef Reinwein (ÖVP)

Area
  - Total: 59.56 km^{2} (23.00 sq mi)
- Elevation: 202 m (663 ft)

Population (2018-01-01)
  - Total: 2,999
  - Density: 50.35/km^{2} (130.4/sq mi)
- Time zone: UTC+1 (CET)
  - Summer (DST): UTC+2 (CEST)
- Postal code: 2013
- Area code: 02954
- Website: www.goellersdorf.at

Göllersdorf is a town in the district of Hollabrunn in Lower Austria, Austria.

Peter Schidlof (1922–1987), the Austrian-British violist and co-founder of the Amadeus Quartet, was born in Göllersdorf.

== Geography ==
Göllersdorf lies in the Weinviertel in Lower Austria about 15 km north-northwest of Stockerau in the valley of the Göllersbach. About a third of the municipality is forested.
