= Anna Goldsteiner =

Austrian war resistor

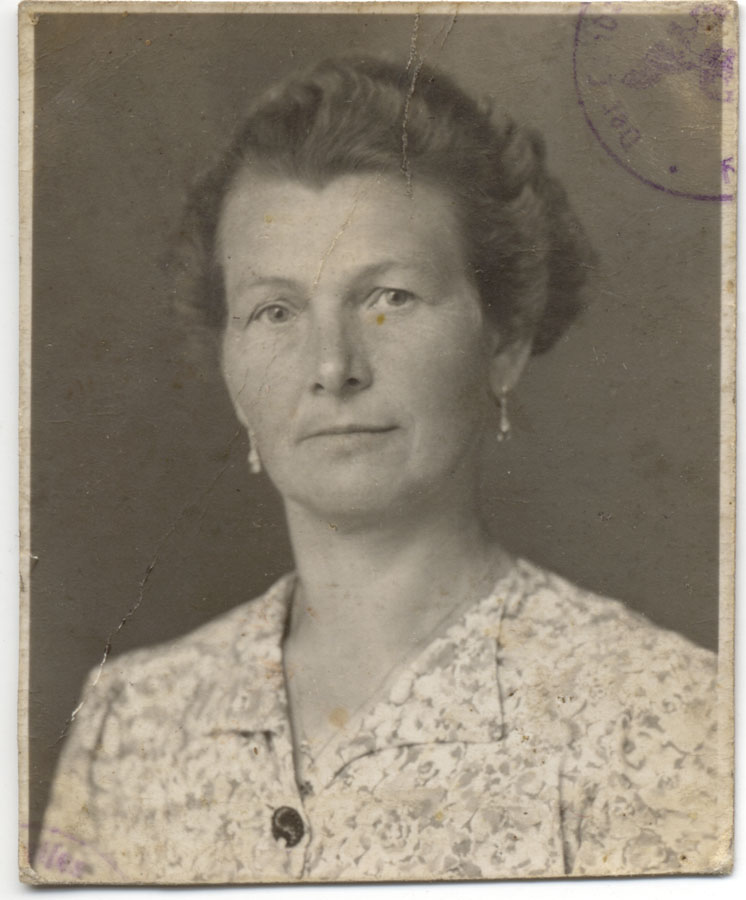
- Anna Goldsteiner (1944)
- Born: Anna Stubenvoll; 17 June 1899; Vienna
- Died: 5 July 1944 (aged 45)
- Burial place: Vienna Central Cemetery
- Occupation: War resistor
- Known for: Execution by Germans
- Spouse: Johann Goldsteiner
- Children: 4

Anna Goldsteiner (born Anna Stubenvoll: 17 June 1899 - 5 July 1944) was a Viennese resistance activist during World War II. She was executed by German forces.

== Biography ==
Anna Stubenvoll was born in Vienna. She was opposed to the incorporation of Austria into an enlarged German state which took place during the first part of 1938, and made her apartment in Pulkau (some distance to the north of Vienna) available to "Schlurf" activists. According to court documents the activists' objectives included 'eternal faithfulness to [my independent] Austria' and 'the forcible separation of the Alpine-Danube Reichsgau from the Greater German state ("Großdeutsche(n) Reich")'.

In December 1943 she was one of 14 members of the group arrested by the Gestapo. They were accused of removing government propaganda posters, preparing explosives attacks and planning to eliminate the Nazi mayor of Pulkau. Anna Goldsteiner faced the district high court in Vienna on 14 April 1944. The charge was the usual one of "preparing to commit high treason and cause military damage". She was sentenced to death, and executed on 5 July 1944.

She is buried in the misleadingly named Vienna Central Cemetery (Plot: Gruppe 40). For convenience, she was buried in the same grave as another of the resistance activists executed at the same time. There was no family connection between the two of them. Anna's husband, Johann Goldsteiner, and their four sons, Rudolf, Franz, Johann and Ernst, all survived the war.

== Personal ==
Anna Stubenvoll married Johann Goldsteiner. The marriage resulted in the birth of four sons.
