= Falkenstein, Lower Austria =

Falkenstein
- Municipality
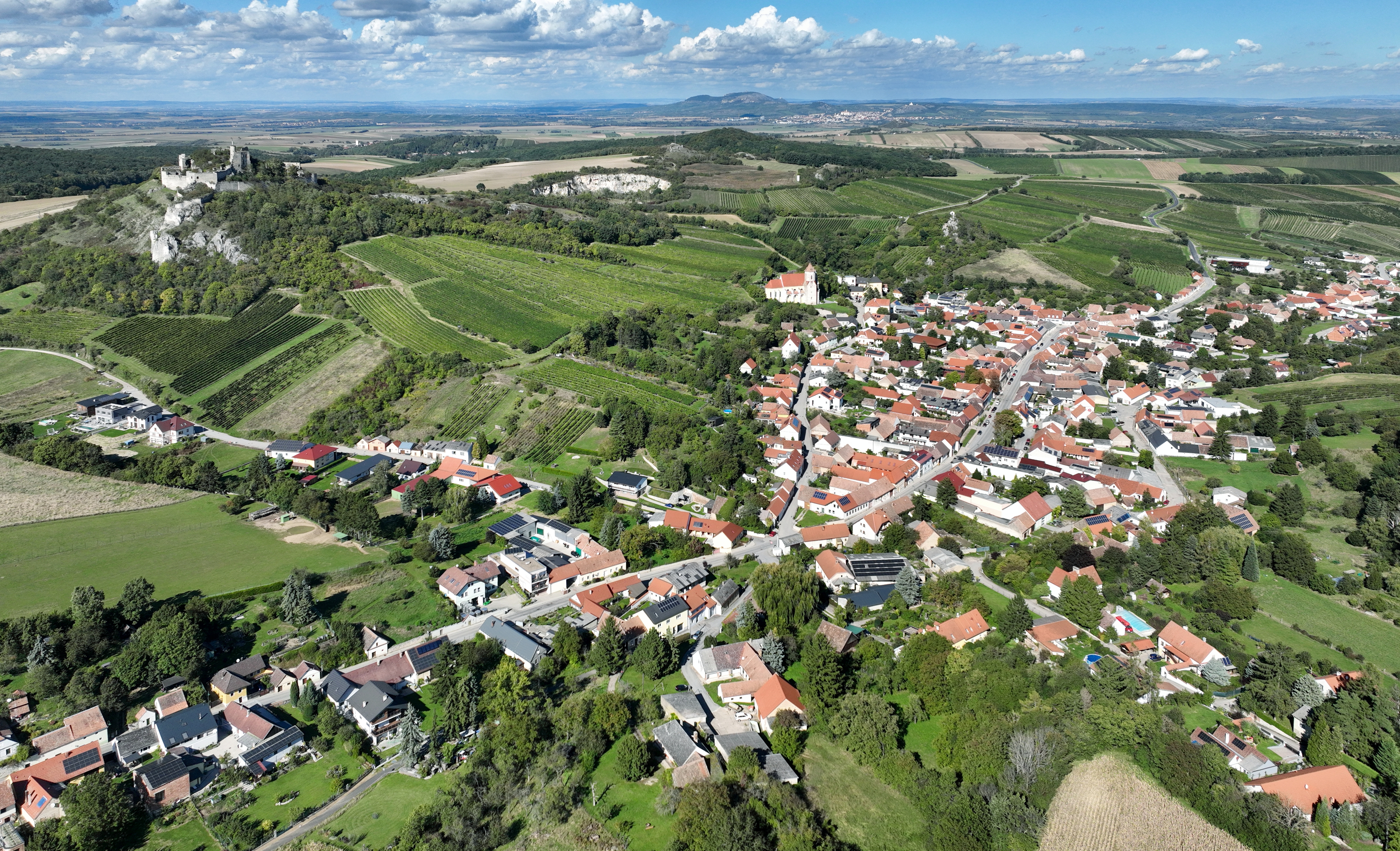

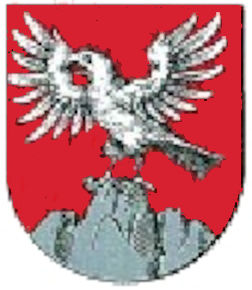
- Coat of arms

- Location within Austria
- Coordinates: 48°43′N 16°35′E
- Country: Austria
- State: Lower Austria
- District: Mistelbach

Government
  - Mayor: Alfred Schuster

Area
  - Total: 19.17 km^{2} (7.40 sq mi)
- Elevation: 302 m (991 ft)

Population (2018-01-01)
  - Total: 457
  - Density: 23.8/km^{2} (61.7/sq mi)
- Time zone: UTC+1 (CET)
  - Summer (DST): UTC+2 (CEST)
- Postal code: 2162
- Area code: 02554
- Website: www.falkenstein.gv.at

Falkenstein (German pronunciation: [ˈfalkn̩ˌʃtaɪn]) is a town in the district of Mistelbach in the Austrian state of Lower Austria.

It is home to Castle Falkenstein, a relatively intact castle ruin built in the 11th century. The ruin's German name is Burg Falkenstein ("Castle Falcon Stone").

== Population ==
Historical population
Year	Pop.	±%
1971	576	—
1981	482	−16.3%
1991	457	−5.2%
2001	468	+2.4%
2011	463	−1.1%
2021	488	+5.4%
