= Wullersdorf =

- Municipality
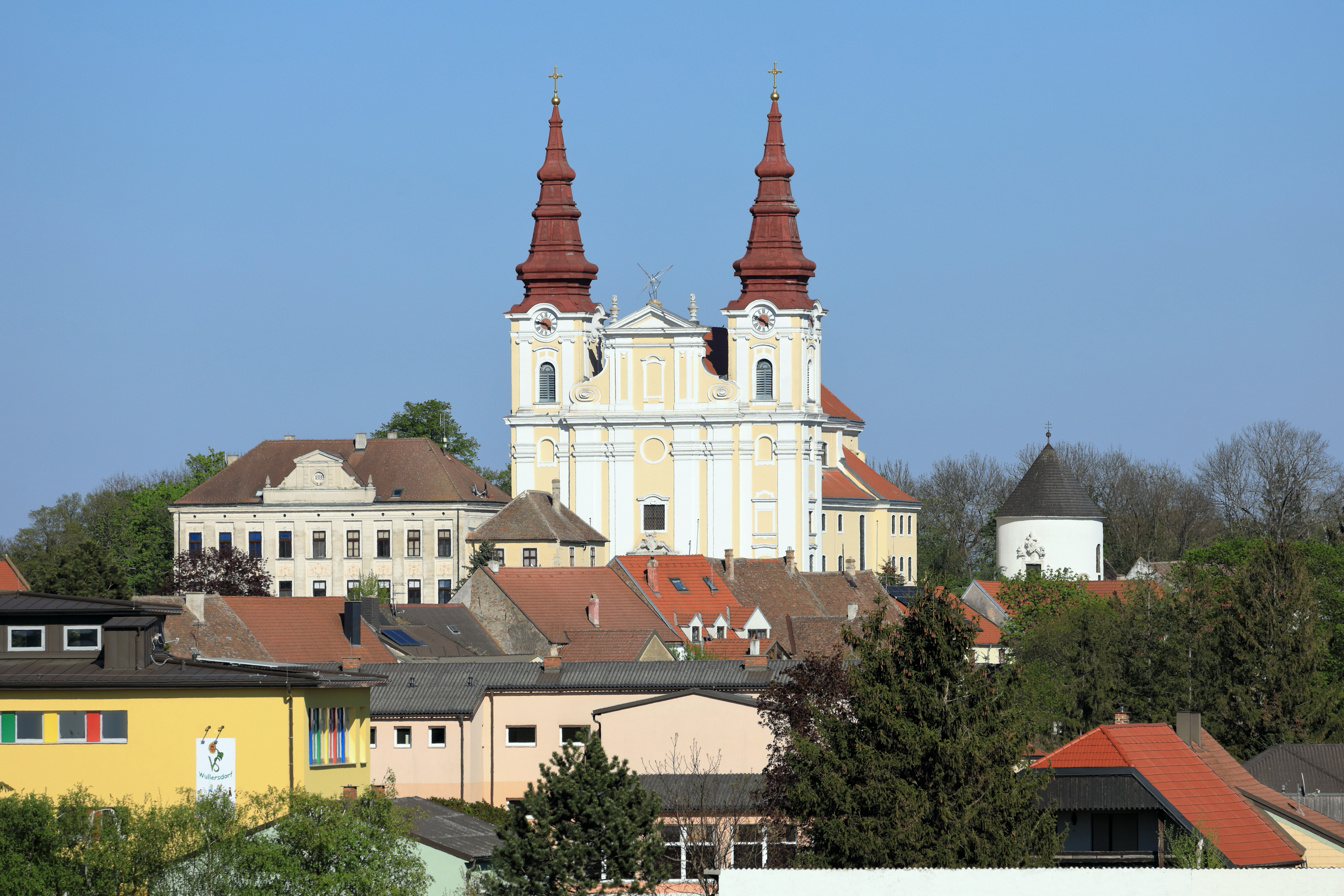

- Coat of arms

- Location within Austria
- Coordinates: 48°36′N 16°6′E
- Country: Austria
- State: Lower Austria
- District: Hollabrunn

Government
  - Mayor: Ignaz Pimberger

Area
  - Total: 63.92 km^{2} (24.68 sq mi)
- Elevation: 248 m (814 ft)

Population (2018-01-01)
  - Total: 2,385
  - Density: 37.31/km^{2} (96.64/sq mi)
- Time zone: UTC+1 (CET)
  - Summer (DST): UTC+2 (CEST)
- Postal code: 2041
- Area code: 02951
- Website: http://www.wullersdorf.at/

Wullersdorf is a town in the district of Hollabrunn in Lower Austria, Austria.

== Geography ==
Wullersdorf lies in the Weinviertel in Lower Austria. About 4.16 percent of the municipality is forested.
