= Ziersdorf =

- Municipality
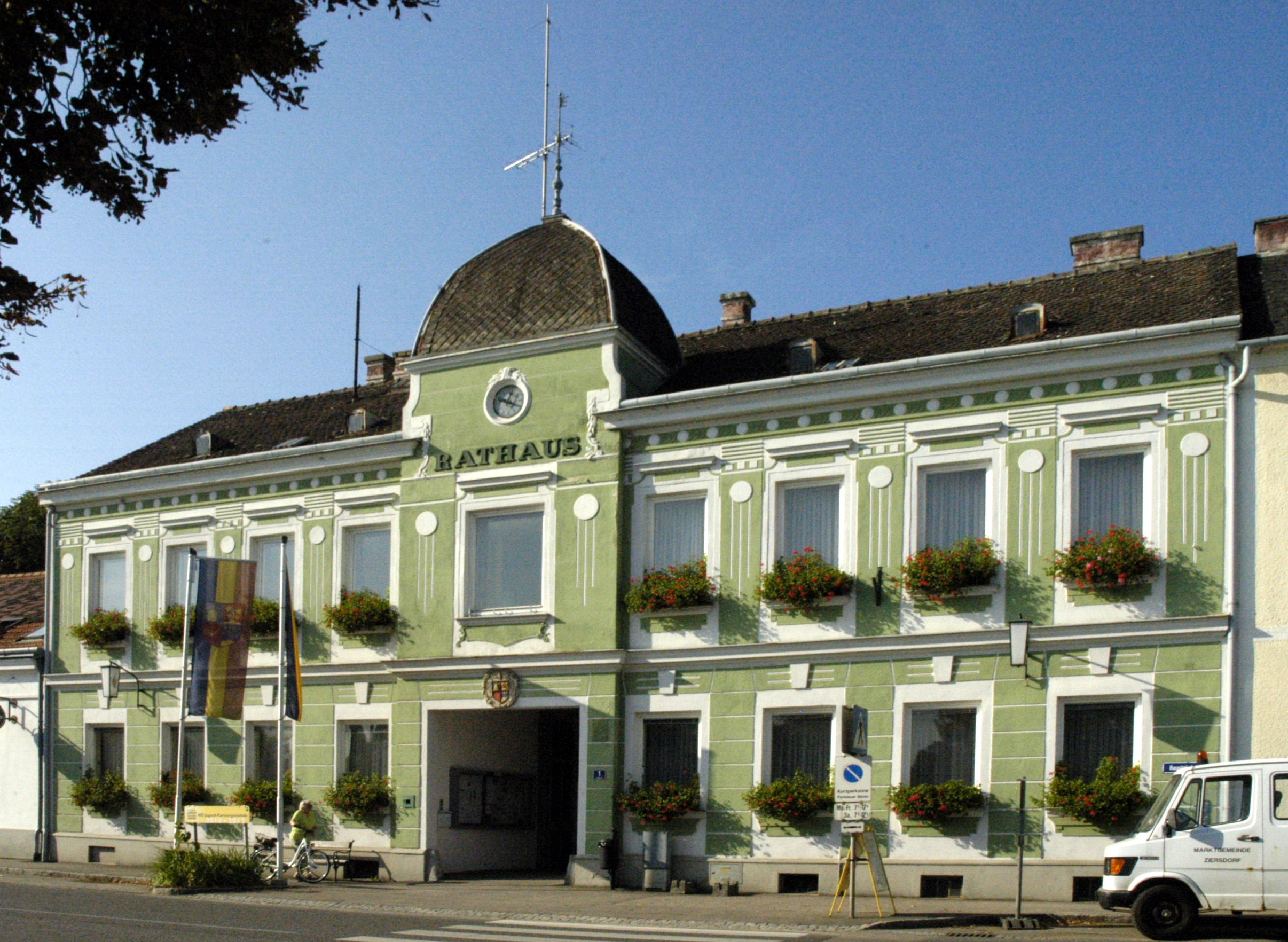
- Town hall

- Coat of arms

- Location within Austria
- Coordinates: 48°32′N 15°56′E
- Country: Austria
- State: Lower Austria
- District: Hollabrunn

Government
  - Mayor: Ing. Hermann Fischer

Area
  - Total: 48.71 km^{2} (18.81 sq mi)
- Elevation: 230 m (750 ft)

Population (2018-01-01)
  - Total: 3,446
  - Density: 70.75/km^{2} (183.2/sq mi)
- Time zone: UTC+1 (CET)
  - Summer (DST): UTC+2 (CEST)
- Postal code: 3710
- Area code: 02956
- Website: www.ziersdorf.at

Ziersdorf is a town in the district of Hollabrunn in Lower Austria, Austria.

== Geography ==
Ziersdorf lies in the Weinviertel in Lower Austria. About 18.76 percent of the municipality is forested.

It consists of the villages Dippersdorf, Fahndorf, Gettsdorf, Großmeiseldorf, Hollenstein, Kiblitz, Radlbrunn, Rohrbach and Ziersdorf.
