= Nappersdorf-Kammersdorf =

- Municipality
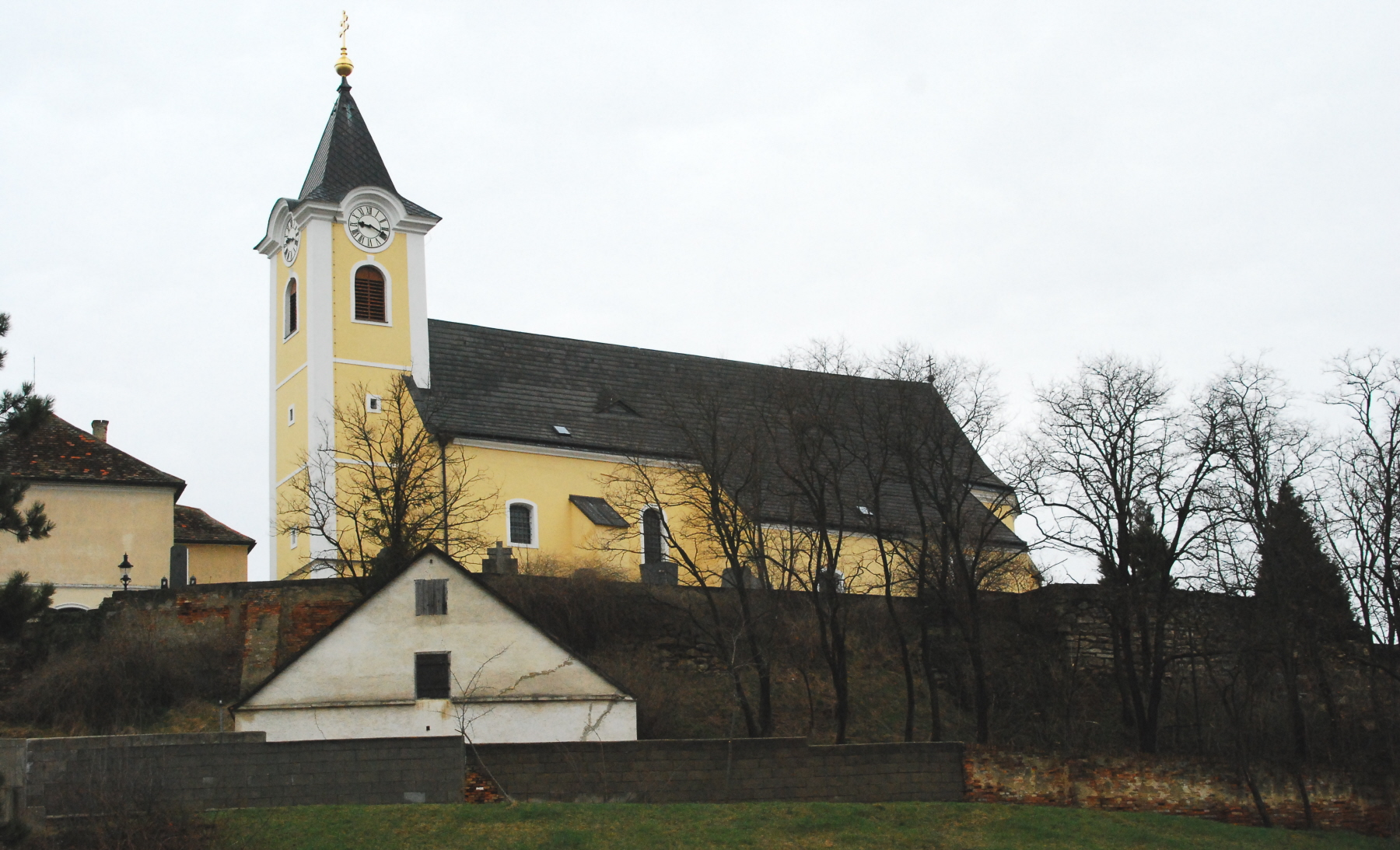
- Nappersdorf parish church

- Coat of arms

- Location within Austria
- Coordinates: 48°38′N 16°14′E
- Country: Austria
- State: Lower Austria
- District: Hollabrunn

Government
  - Mayor: Werner Gössl

Area
  - Total: 38.87 km^{2} (15.01 sq mi)
- Elevation: 234 m (768 ft)

Population (2018-01-01)
  - Total: 1,233
  - Density: 31.72/km^{2} (82.16/sq mi)
- Time zone: UTC+1 (CET)
  - Summer (DST): UTC+2 (CEST)
- Postal code: 2033
- Area code: 02953
- Website: www.tiscover.at/nappersdorf-kammersdorf

Nappersdorf-Kammersdorf is a town in the district of Hollabrunn in Lower Austria, Austria. Located in the northern Weinviertel region, approximately seven percent of the municipality's total area is forested.

== Geography ==
Nappersdorf-Kammersdorf lies in the hills of the Weinviertel in Lower Austria northeast of Hollabrunn, about 70 km north of Vienna on the way from Hollabrunn to Laa an der Thaya. About 7.05 percent of the municipality is forested.
