= Guntersdorf =

- Municipality
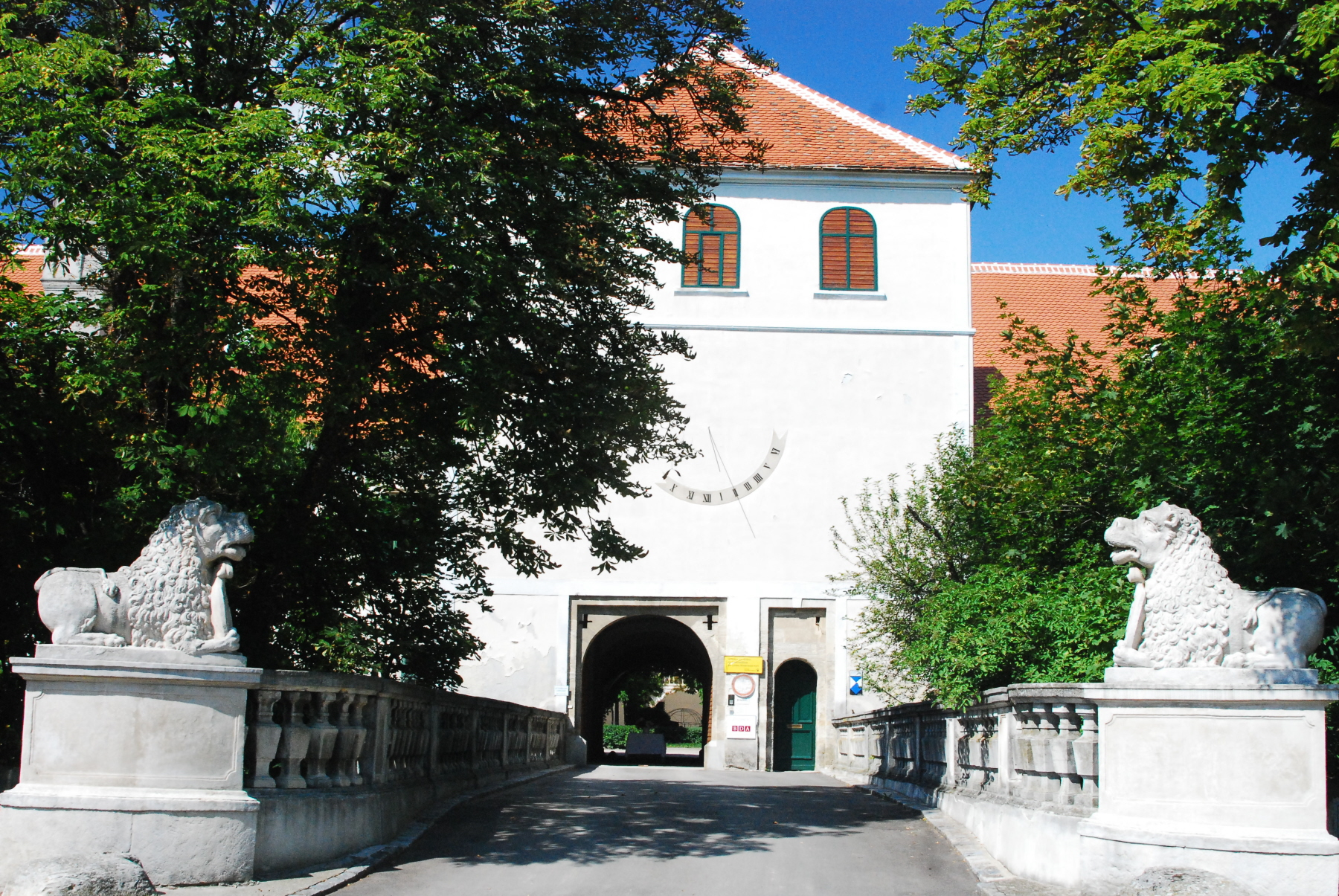
- Guntersdorf Castle

- Flag Coat of arms

- Location within Austria
- Coordinates: 48°39′N 16°3′E
- Country: Austria
- State: Lower Austria
- District: Hollabrunn

Government
  - Mayor: Roland Weber (ÖVP)

Area
  - Total: 28.42 km^{2} (10.97 sq mi)
- Elevation: 246 m (807 ft)

Population (2018-01-01)
  - Total: 1,145
  - Density: 40.29/km^{2} (104.3/sq mi)
- Time zone: UTC+1 (CET)
  - Summer (DST): UTC+2 (CEST)
- Postal code: 2042
- Area code: 02951
- Website: https://www.guntersdorf.at/

Guntersdorf is a market town in the district of Hollabrunn in Lower Austria, Austria. The market town of Guntersdorf has an area of 28.42 km2 and about 1,172 inhabitants. The current mayor of Guntersdorf, Mag. Roland Weber took over for Günther Bradac in November 2013.

== Geography ==
Guntersdorf lies in the Weinviertel in Lower Austria. Only about 1.2 percent of the municipality is forested.
