= Hadres =

- Municipality
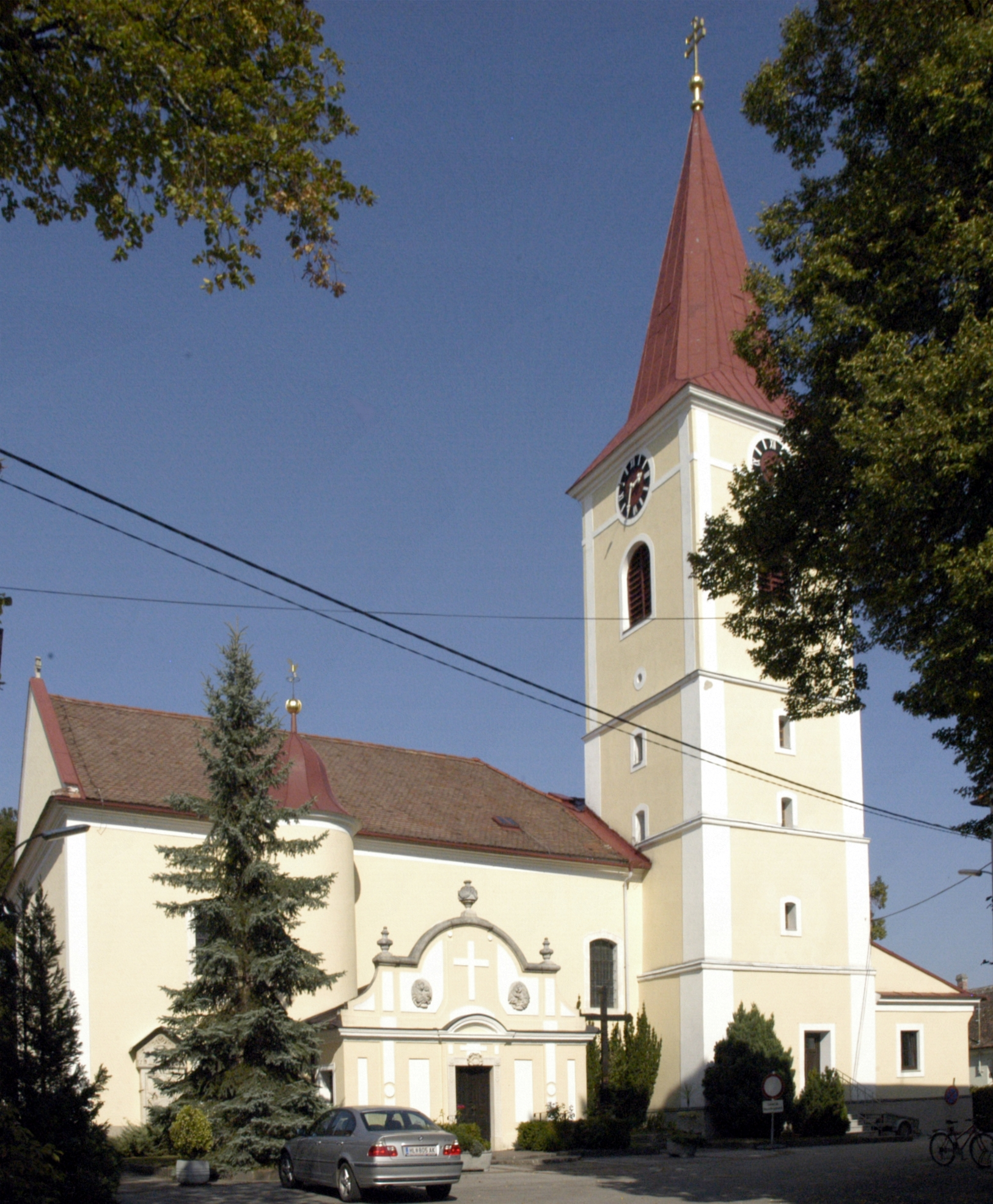
- Hadres parish church

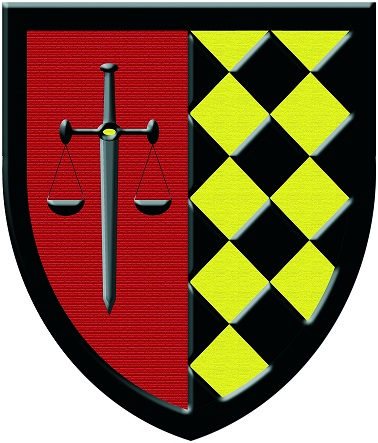
- Coat of arms

- Location within Austria
- Coordinates: 48°42′N 16°8′E
- Country: Austria
- State: Lower Austria
- District: Hollabrunn

Government
  - Mayor: Karl Weber

Area
  - Total: 34.47 km^{2} (13.31 sq mi)
- Elevation: 194 m (636 ft)

Population (2018-01-01)
  - Total: 1,685
  - Density: 48.88/km^{2} (126.6/sq mi)
- Time zone: UTC+1 (CET)
  - Summer (DST): UTC+2 (CEST)
- Postal code: 2061
- Area code: 02943
- Website: www.hadres.info

Hadres is a town in the district of Hollabrunn in Lower Austria, Austria.

== Geography ==
Hadres lies in the Pulkau valley in the Weinviertel in Lower Austria. About 8.99 percent of the municipality is forested.
