= Ravelsbach =

- Municipality
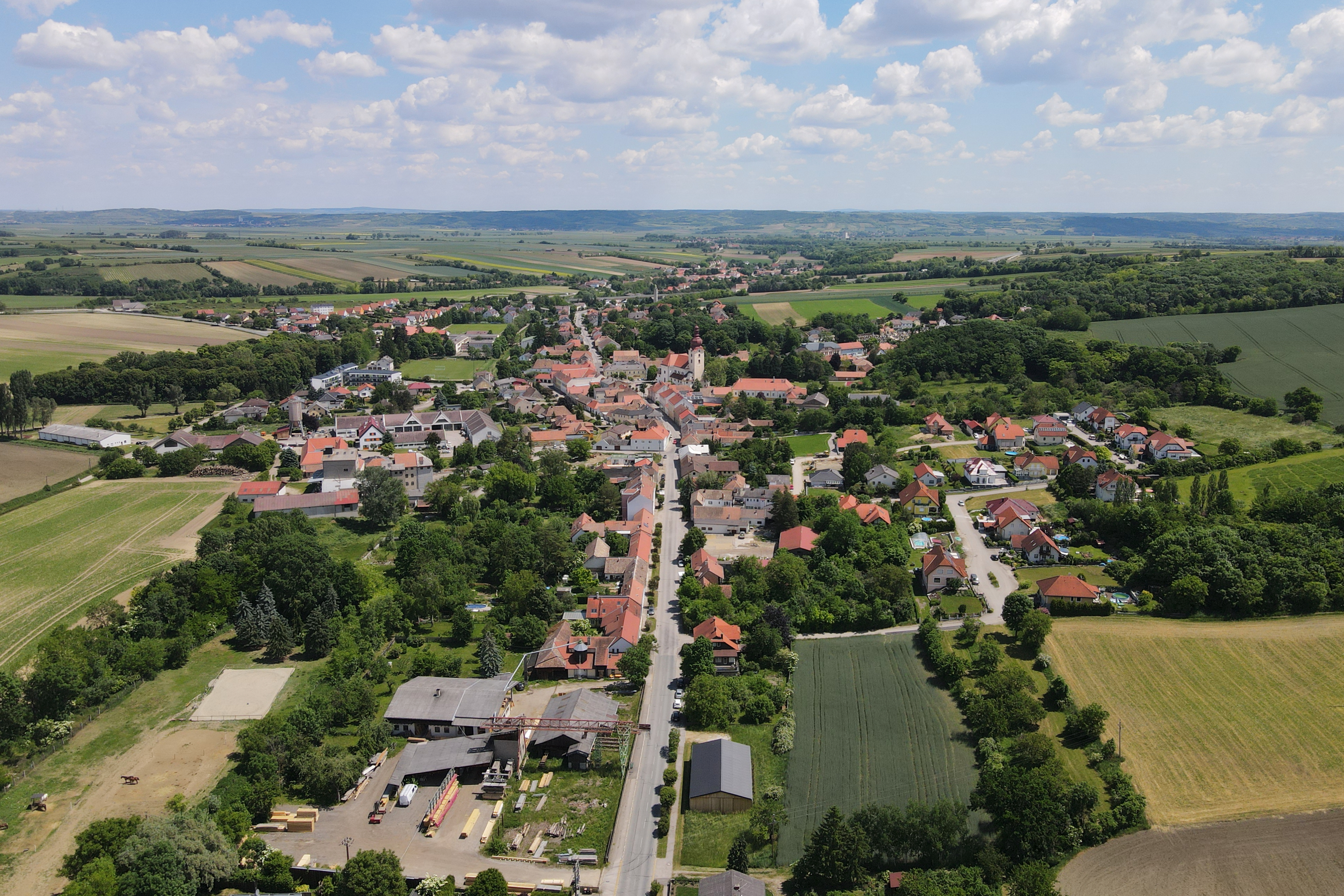
- Aerial view of Ravelsbach

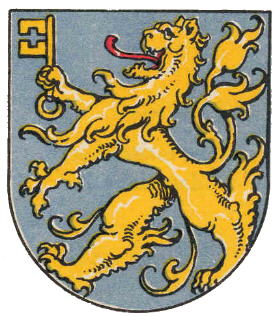
- Coat of arms

- Location within Austria
- Coordinates: 48°33′N 15°51′E
- Country: Austria
- State: Lower Austria
- District: Hollabrunn

Government
  - Mayor: Walter Schmid

Area
  - Total: 26.36 km^{2} (10.18 sq mi)
- Elevation: 265 m (869 ft)

Population (2018-01-01)
  - Total: 1,580
  - Density: 59.9/km^{2} (155/sq mi)
- Time zone: UTC+1 (CET)
  - Summer (DST): UTC+2 (CEST)
- Postal code: 3720
- Area code: 02958
- Website: www.ravelsbach.at

Ravelsbach is a municipality in the district of Hollabrunn in Lower Austria, Austria.

== Geography ==
Ravelsbach lies in the Weinviertel in Lower Austria. Only about 4.25 of the municipality is forested.
