= Retz =

- Municipality
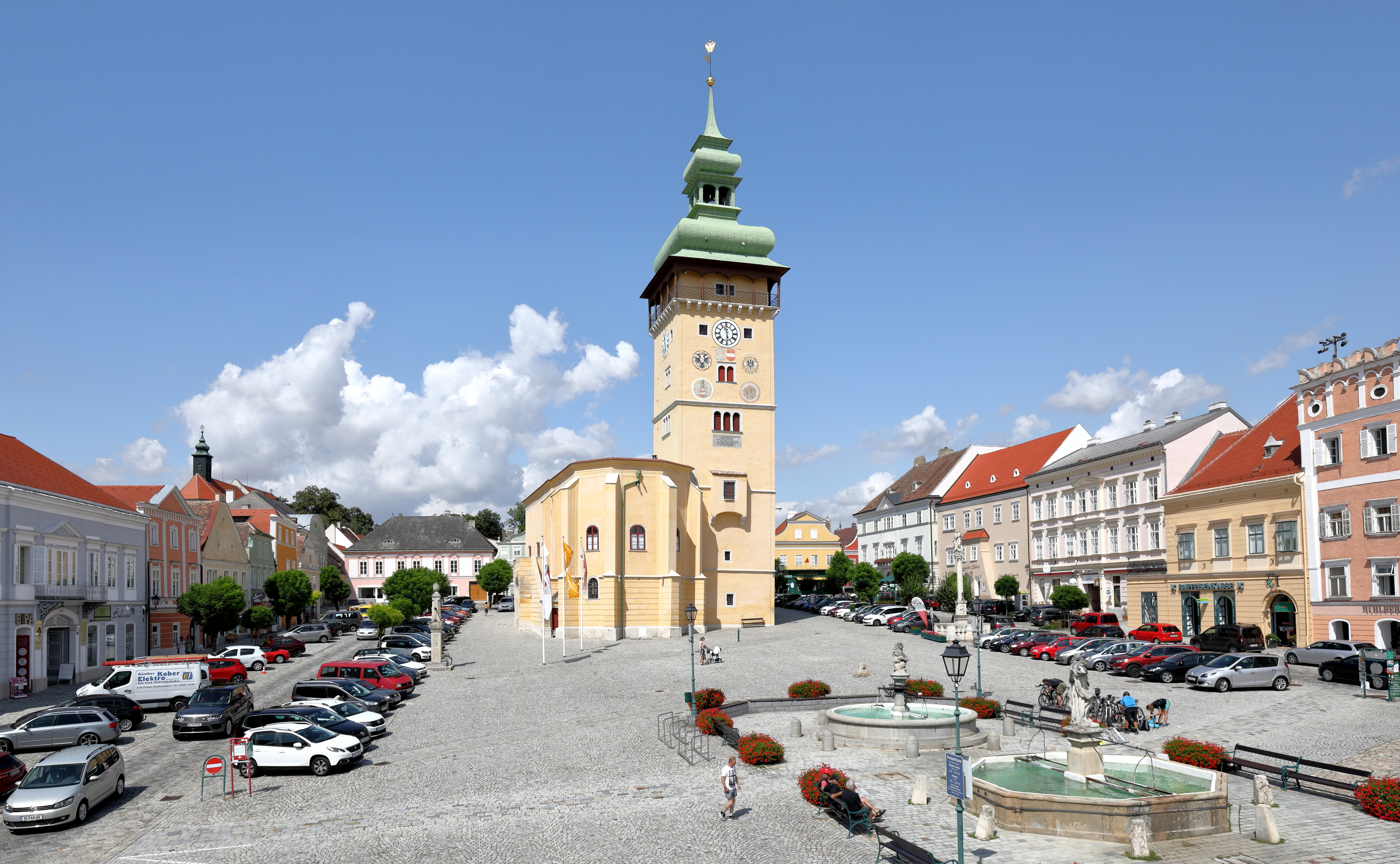
- Main square of Retz

- Coat of arms

- Location within Austria
- Coordinates: 48°45′N 15°57′E
- Country: Austria
- State: Lower Austria
- District: Hollabrunn

Government
  - Mayor: Helmut Koch (ÖVP)

Area
  - Total: 45.02 km^{2} (17.38 sq mi)
- Elevation: 252 m (827 ft)

Population (2018-01-01)
  - Total: 4,249
  - Density: 94.38/km^{2} (244.4/sq mi)
- Time zone: UTC+1 (CET)
  - Summer (DST): UTC+2 (CEST)
- Postal code: 2070
- Area code: 02942
- Vehicle registration: HL
- Website: www.retz.at

Retz is a town with a population of 4,168 in the Hollabrunn District in Lower Austria, Austria.

== Geography ==
Retz is located in the north western Weinviertel in Lower Austria. The municipality's area covers 45,01 km^{2}. 11.83 percent of this area is forested. Cadastral municipalities are Hofern, Kleinhöflein, Kleinriedenthal, Obernalb, Retz and Unternalb.

== History ==
=== Middle Ages ===
In the area around the present-day Anger (Meadow) of Retz a village was formed, which was first mentioned in 1180 as „Rezze“ (Slavic; meaning small creek).

Rudolf von Habsburg awarded Count Berthold of Rabenswalde (1278–1312) shire and sovereignty of Hardegg as a fiefdom. The count did not stay for long in Hardegg, and moved to Retz, where he founded the monastery of the Dominican Order (called Dominikanerkloster). The monastery was finished in 1295. Finally he founded the city of Retz around 1300.

Around 1343 the preacher Franz von Retz was born. He reformed the Dominican Order, taught at the University of Vienna, was their Dean for five times, and also represented the university at the Council of Pisa. He died on September 8, 1427, in Vienna.

In 1425, the Hussites conquered Retz (November 25), and only a few days later, Schrattenthal and Pulkau. The city was destroyed and many people were killed. A chronicle from Klosterneuburg reported of 6000 captives, among them Count Heinrich of Maidburg (Hardegg), who were led to Prague. Nearly 8000 men were said to be slain and over 30 Catholic churches destroyed. In 1431 the Hussites came to raid Retz for a second time.

In 1467 the Burgerspitalkapelle ("Citizens' Hospital Chapel"), located between the Verderberhaus and the Znaimer Tor, was consecrated. It was secularized in 1783. Today it serves as a museum for the South Moravian gallery.

After the reconstruction of the city Retz was conquered by Matthias Corvinus on October 10, 1486, after a six-day siege. Until 1492 Retz belonged to his dominion. During that time the city received the privileges concerning the trade of wine which were responsible for its future wealth. Also as a consequence of these privileges the huge and multi-storied wine cellar system was built. Today it is used for guided tours and serves as the location for a Christmas market during Advent.

=== 16th and 17th century ===
From 1568 to 1569 the former church on the main square was transformed into the city's town hall by implementing an intermediate ceiling. In the first floor the Marienkapelle was built. The cabinetmaker Jakob Barth of Retz was working for over 30 years on the carvings.

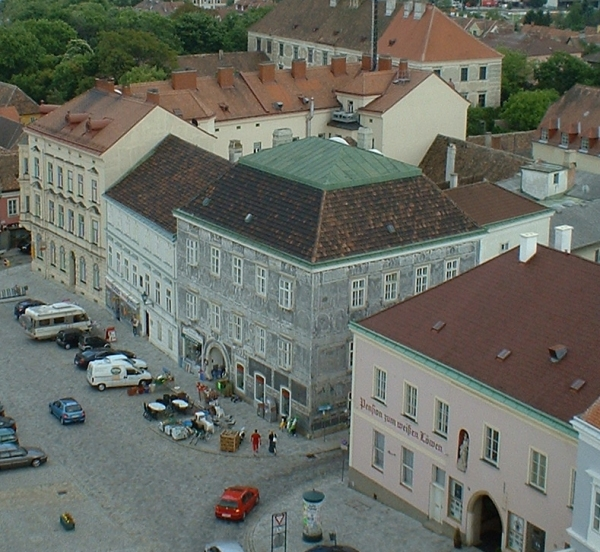
The historical Sgraffitohaus

In 1576, the Sgraffitohaus was built. In 1928, the overpainted paintings were discovered and uncovered again.

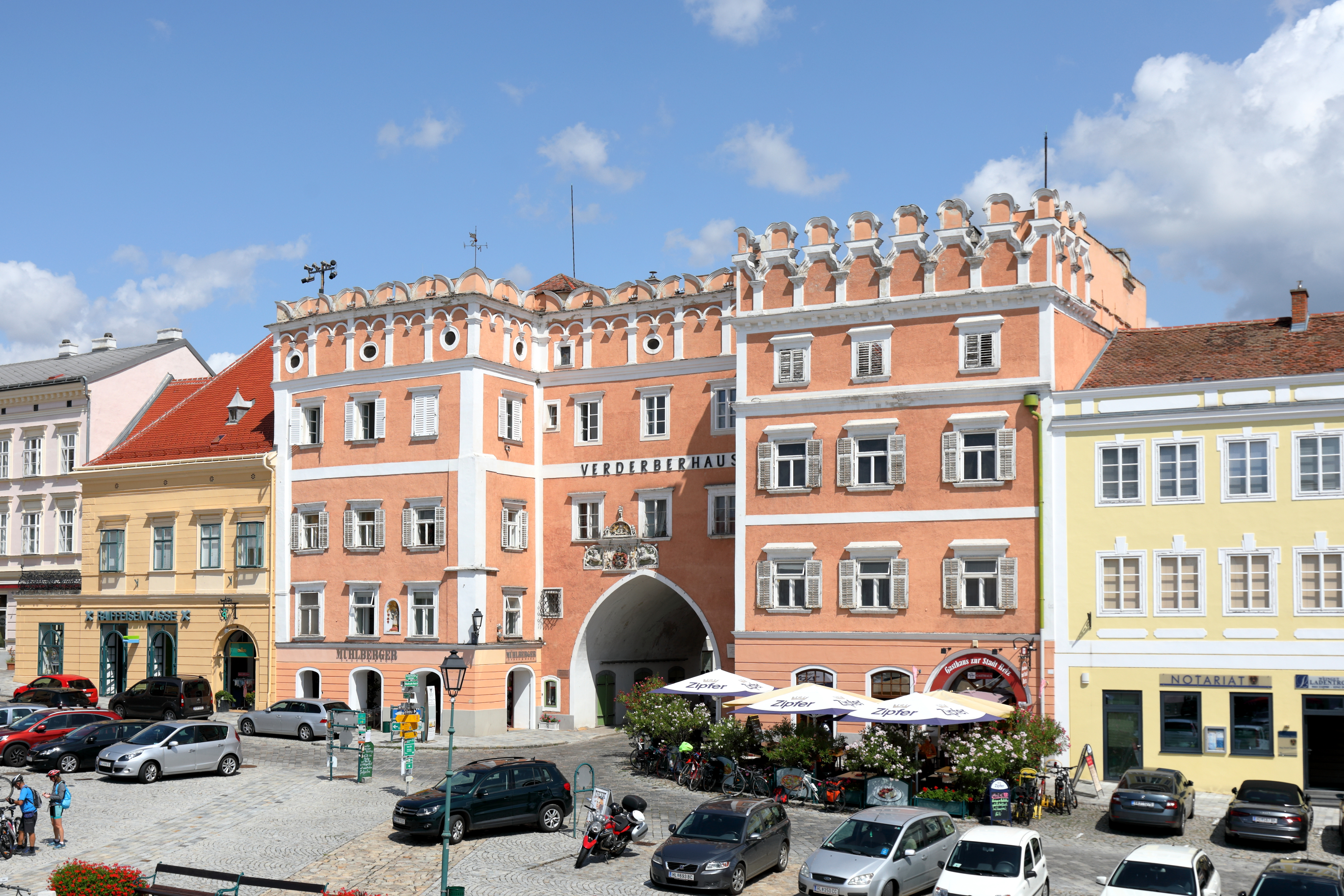
The Verderberhaus, built in 1583

The eye-catching Verderberhaus originates to the year 1583. It has its name from a family named Verderber which was a very wealthy family in Retz at that time. The family acquired the building in 1848.

The Thirty Years' War brought destruction to the town, and also did the Swedes under Lennart Torstensson, who set up his headquarters in Schrattenthal.

Between 1660 and 1670 the castle of the Suttner-Gatterburg family was built. Today it is home to the bicycle museum of Retz. During the shootings for the TV series Julia - eine außergewöhnliche Frau between 1998 and 2002, the fictional police station was situated there.

In 1680 the bubonic plague came to the town. The Pestsäule on the main square still recalls this dramatic event.

After 1696 it was permitted to build buildings higher than the city's defensive wall. This was the reason for the Dominican Order to increase the size of their monastery by a third story.

=== 18th and 19th century ===
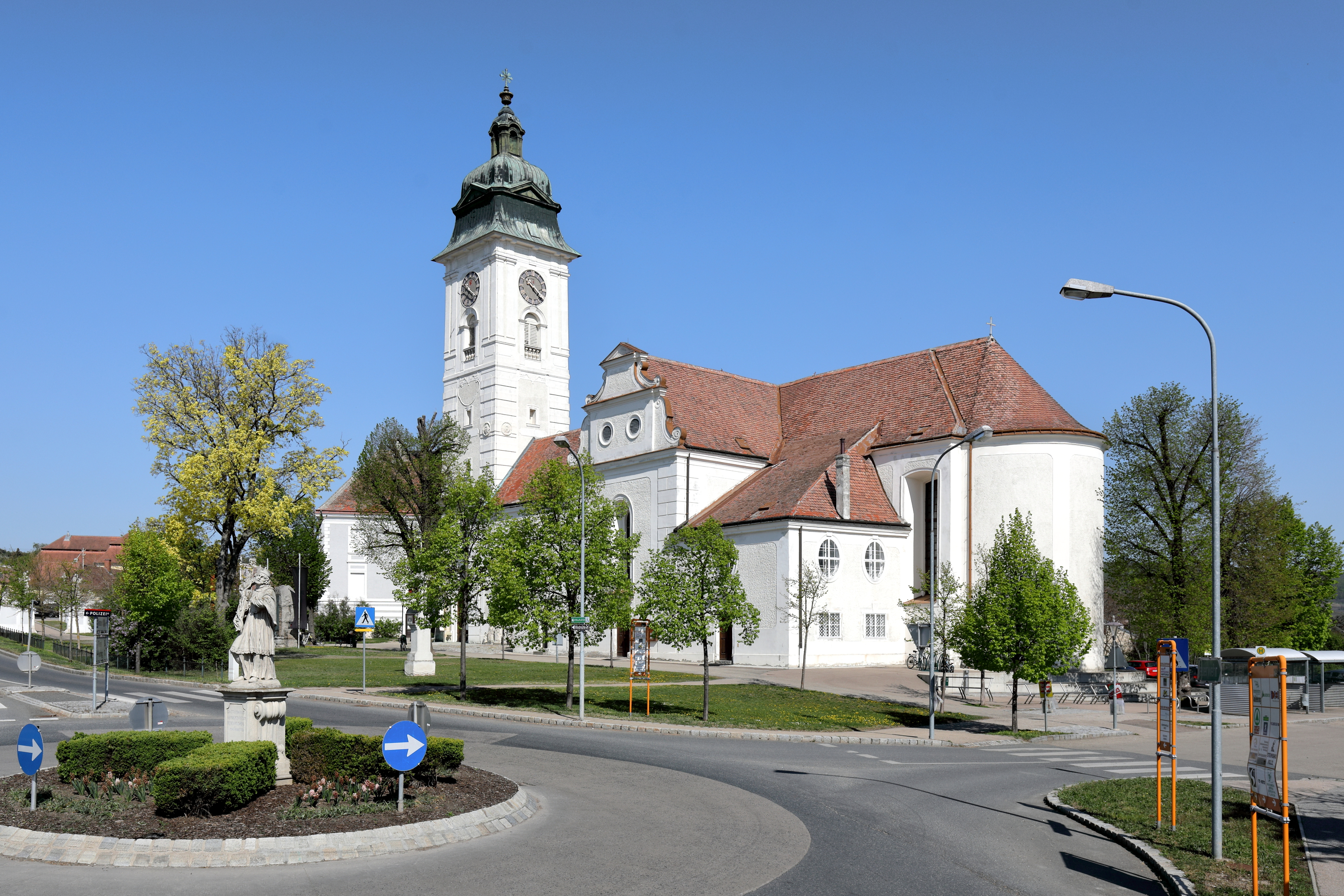
Parish church Saint Stephen

In the years 1701 to 1713 the spire was revamped in the baroque style. Between 1721 and 1728 the church as a whole was enlarged, rebuilt, and revamped in the baroque style. The altarpiece showing Saint Stephen, painted by Leopold Kupelwieser, dates from the year 1852.

The first windmill in Retz was entirely built out of wood in 1772. Later, a second windmill, built out of stone, was erected nearby. The second windmill is not used as a windmill anymore, and now serves as a residential house.

In 1831 the wooden windmill was removed and a new windmill was built on the same spot. This is still one of the town's landmarks today, for it is the only fully functional windmill left in Austria. There was also a bricklayer from Lesná u Znojma (South Moravia) involved in this project. He used the knowledge he acquired to build a windmill in his hometown, which was later inherited by the son of the miller of Retz. In 1927, the windmill was shut down. Not far from the windmill the Kalvarienberg is located. It was erected in the years 1727–37 by Jakob Seer.

On November 1, 1871, Retz was connected to the international railway system by the Austrian Northwestern Railway.

In 1896, a Jewish house of prayer was built, which does not exist anymore. The local post office dates from the year 1897.

== Politics ==
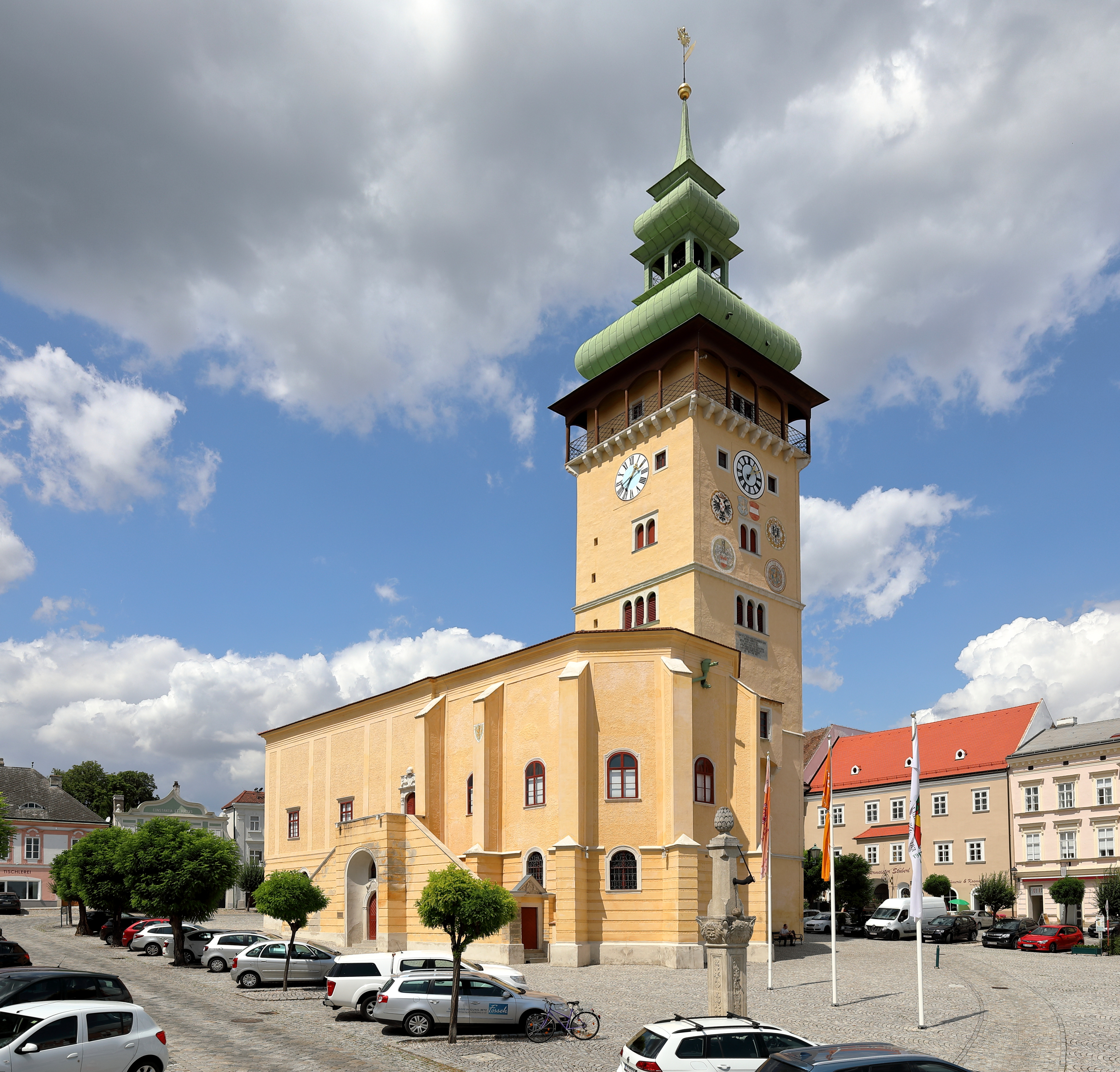
The town hall

Mayor of the town is Helmut Koch, chief officer is Andreas Sedlmayer. In the municipal council there are 25 seats and the distribution of mandates after the municipal council election from March 6, 2005 is as follows: ÖVP 16, SPÖ 8, Greens 1, other parties no seats.

=== Twin cities ===
Retz is twinned with the following cities:

- Rötz, Germany
- Hainburg, Germany
- Znojmo, Czech Republic

== Main sights ==
=== Historical buildings ===
- Hauptplatz (main square) with Pranger (pillory), town hall, Verderberhaus and Sgraffitohaus. Beneath the Hauptplatz is the extensive wine cellar system
- Gatterburg castle
- Dominikanerkirche and monastery (Dominican church)
- Parish church Saint Stephen
- Windmill of Retz
- Calvary
- Military cemetery built in 1979 where all German soldiers who fell in the Weinviertel are buried together since then.

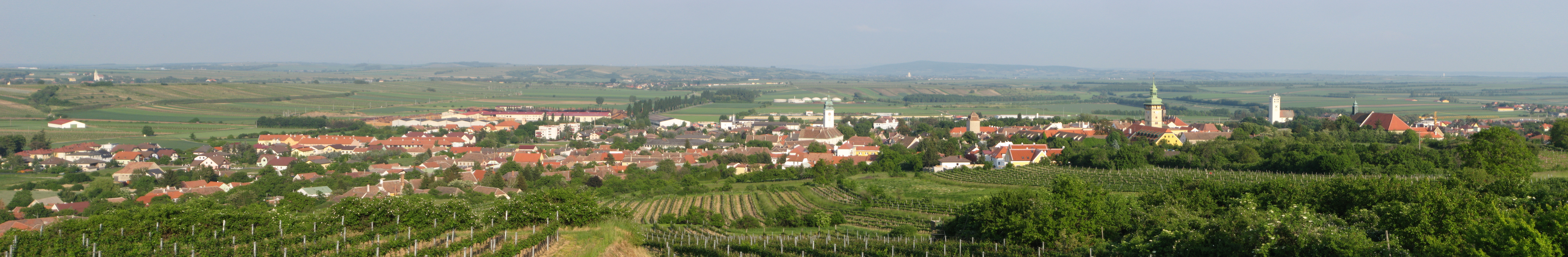
Panoramic photography of the city

=== Museums ===
- Fahrradmuseum (bicycle museum) at Gatterburg castle
- Retzer Erlebniskeller ("Adventure wine cellar"), one of the biggest cellar systems in Mitteleuropa
- Museum Retz (museum of local history and South Moravian gallery)

== Events ==
- Weintage ("Wine days") - annual, 10 days from Corpus Christi on
- Weinlesefest ("Grape harvest festival") - annual, Friday to Sunday on the last weekend of September
- Kürbisfest im Retzer Land ("Pumpkin festival") in the region around Retz

== Economy and infrastructure ==
Retz is a traditional trading city and is best known for its dealing in wines.

There are 206 non-agricultural workplaces as of 2001, and 315 agricultural workplaces as of 1999. The number of gainful persons is 1,709 according to the census of 2001. The activity rate was 42.08 percent.

=== Transportation ===
Retz has a station on the Nordwestbahn, with regular scheduled traffic to Vienna but also to Znojmo in Czech Republic.

=== Inhabitant growth ===
According to the 2001 census, Retz has 4,168 inhabitants. Back in 1991, there were 4,284 inhabitants, in 1981 4,333, and 4,927 inhabitants in 1971.
