= Alberndorf im Pulkautal =

- Municipality
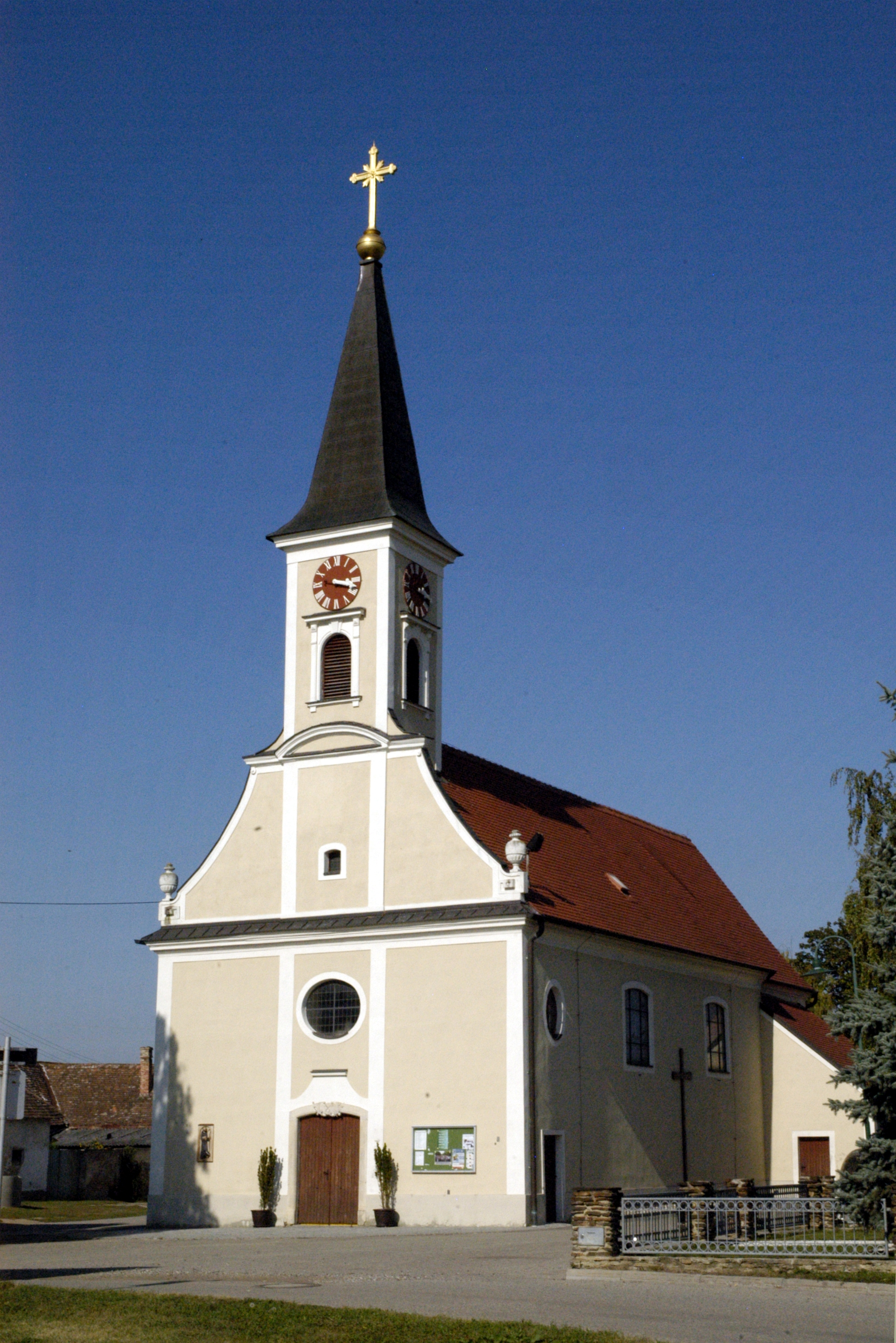
- Alberndorf parish church

- Coat of arms

- Location within Austria
- Coordinates: 48°42′N 16°6′E
- Country: Austria
- State: Lower Austria
- District: Hollabrunn

Government
  - Mayor: Johann Neubauer

Area
  - Total: 9.88 km^{2} (3.81 sq mi)
- Elevation: 197 m (646 ft)

Population (2018-01-01)
  - Total: 744
  - Density: 75.3/km^{2} (195/sq mi)
- Time zone: UTC+1 (CET)
  - Summer (DST): UTC+2 (CEST)
- Postal code: 2054
- Area code: 02944
- Website: www.alberndorf-pulkautal.at

Alberndorf im Pulkautal is a town in the district of Hollabrunn in Lower Austria, Austria.

== Population ==
Historical population
| Year | Pop. | ±% |
|---|---|---|
| 1869 | 1,087 | — |
| 1880 | 1,181 | +8.6% |
| 1890 | 1,154 | −2.3% |
| 1900 | 1,111 | −3.7% |
| 1910 | 1,119 | +0.7% |
| 1923 | 1,025 | −8.4% |
| 1934 | 995 | −2.9% |
| 1939 | 940 | −5.5% |
| 1951 | 841 | −10.5% |
| 1961 | 730 | −13.2% |
| 1971 | 653 | −10.5% |
| 1981 | 606 | −7.2% |
| 1991 | 654 | +7.9% |
| 2001 | 738 | +12.8% |
| 2011 | 733 | −0.7% |
| 2021 | 745 | +1.6% |

== Twin towns ==
Alberndorf is twinned with Hainburg, Germany.

== Politics ==
Mayor of the town is Christian Hartmann from the Austrian People's Party (ÖVP). Chief Officer is Marion Koran. The town council, consisting of 15 seats, is distributed to following parties after the election 2020: ÖVP 7, HLA 5, SPÖ 1, FPÖ 2.
