= Manhartsberg =

Mountain ridge in Austria

Coordinates: 48°32′N 15°44′E

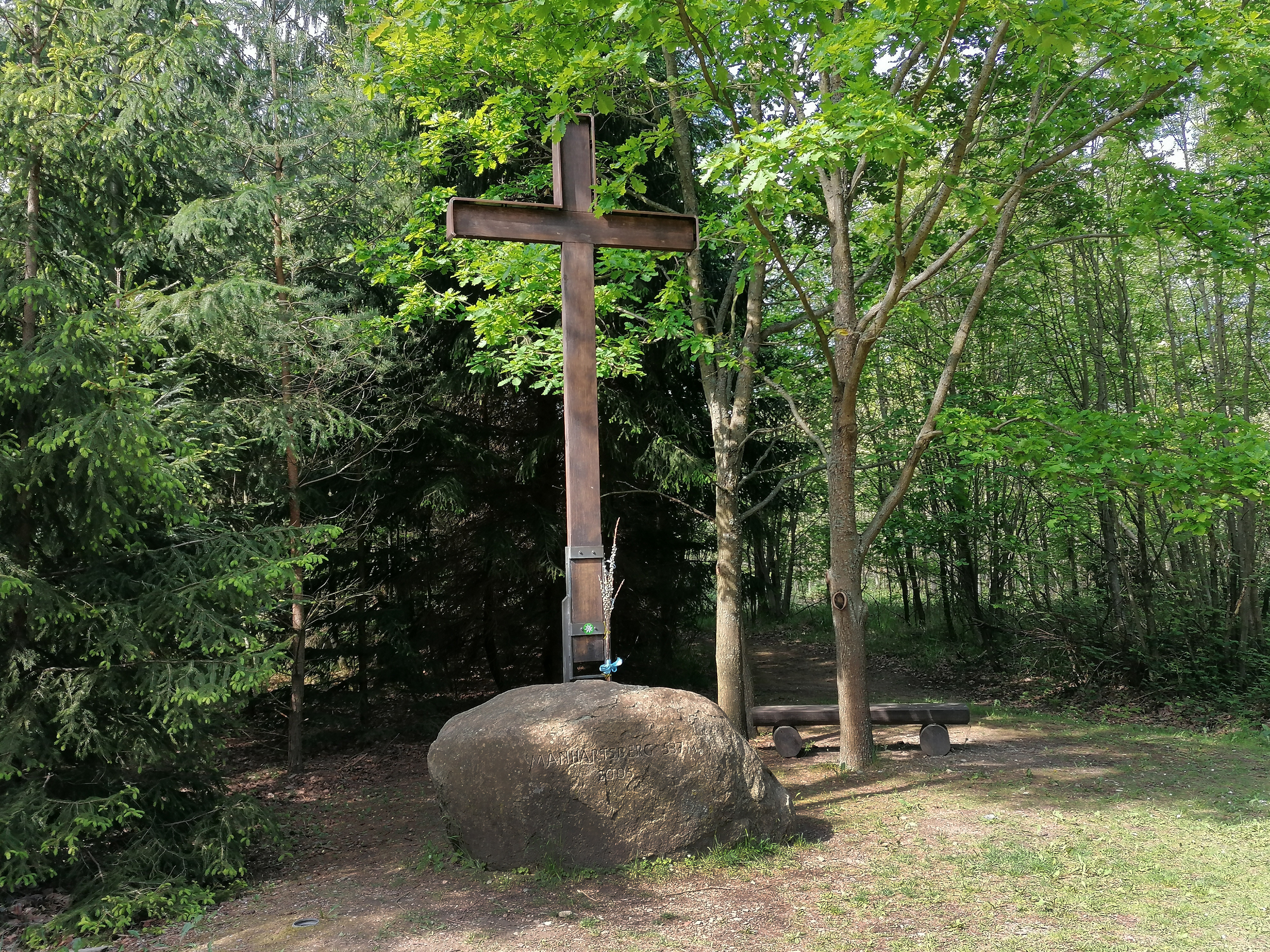
Manhartsberg summit cross

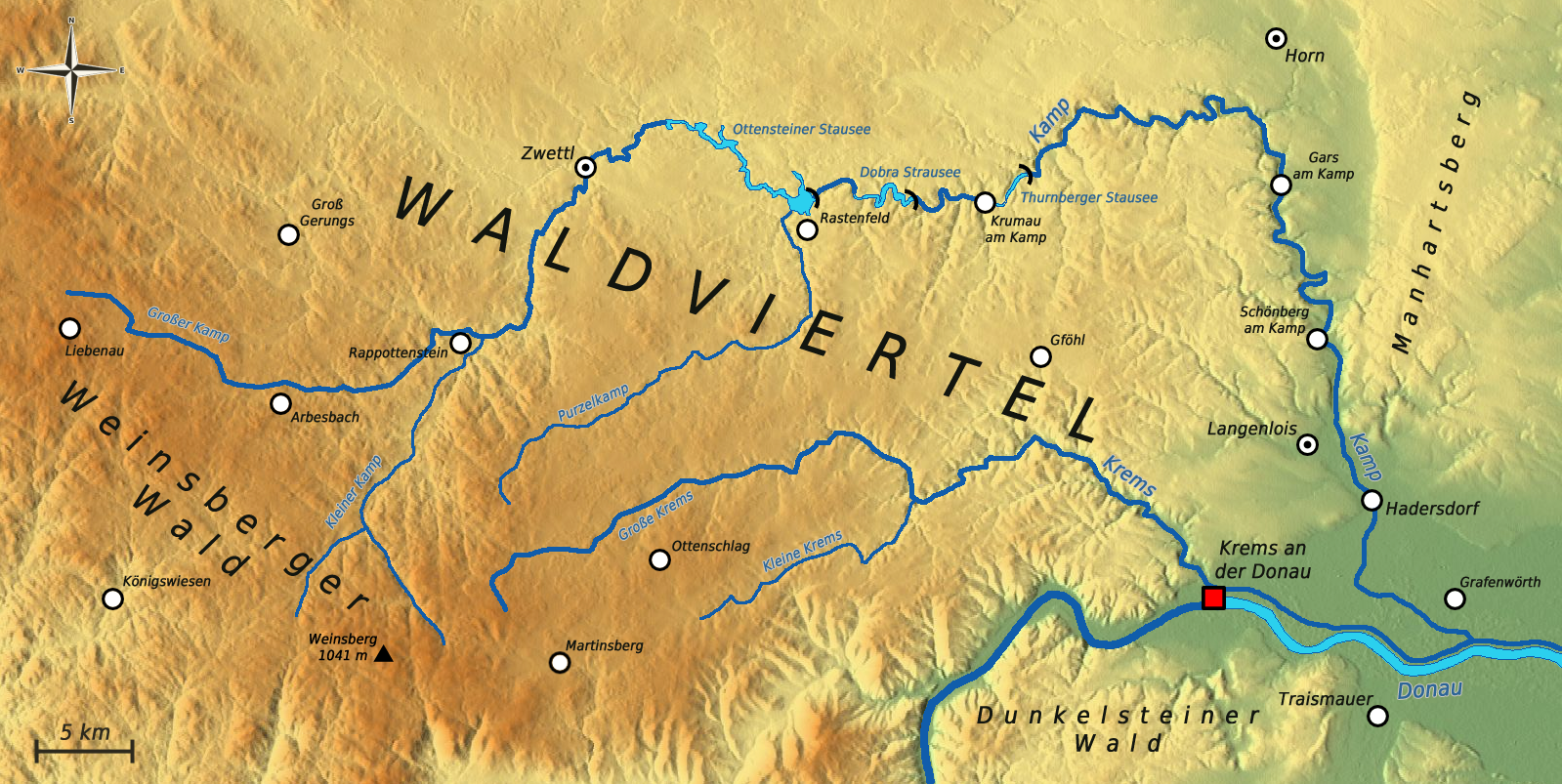
Topographic map of the rivers Kamp and Krems with Manhartsberg on the far right, east of the river Kamp

Manhartsberg is a low, flat-lying mountain ridge in Lower Austria. It rises to a maximum height of 537 m. It is the southeastern flank of the granite Bohemian massif.

The ridge runs from the Thaya river up to the Wagram mountain range and is partly overlaid with Neogene sediments, primarily clays, sands and gravels of the Vienna Basin formations. This ridge continues to the northeast into Moravia in the area near Znojmo. The Manhartsberg forms the southeastern edge of the Bohemian massif and constitutes the boundary between two parts of Lower Austria, the upper quarter above the Manhartsberg (Waldviertel) and the lower quarter under the Manhartsberg (Weinviertel). On its west side runs the Kamp river. The western slopes of the Manhartsberg are part of the Kamptal-Schönberg nature park, which has been recognized by UNESCO as an international geopark, the Kamptal Geopark.

Above the town of Maissau, rich veins of amethyst have been found in the Manhartsberg.

Next to one of the highest points on the ridge are the remains of a World War II secret radar installation, whose code name was Zangendorf 4.
