= Sitzendorf an der Schmida =

- Municipality
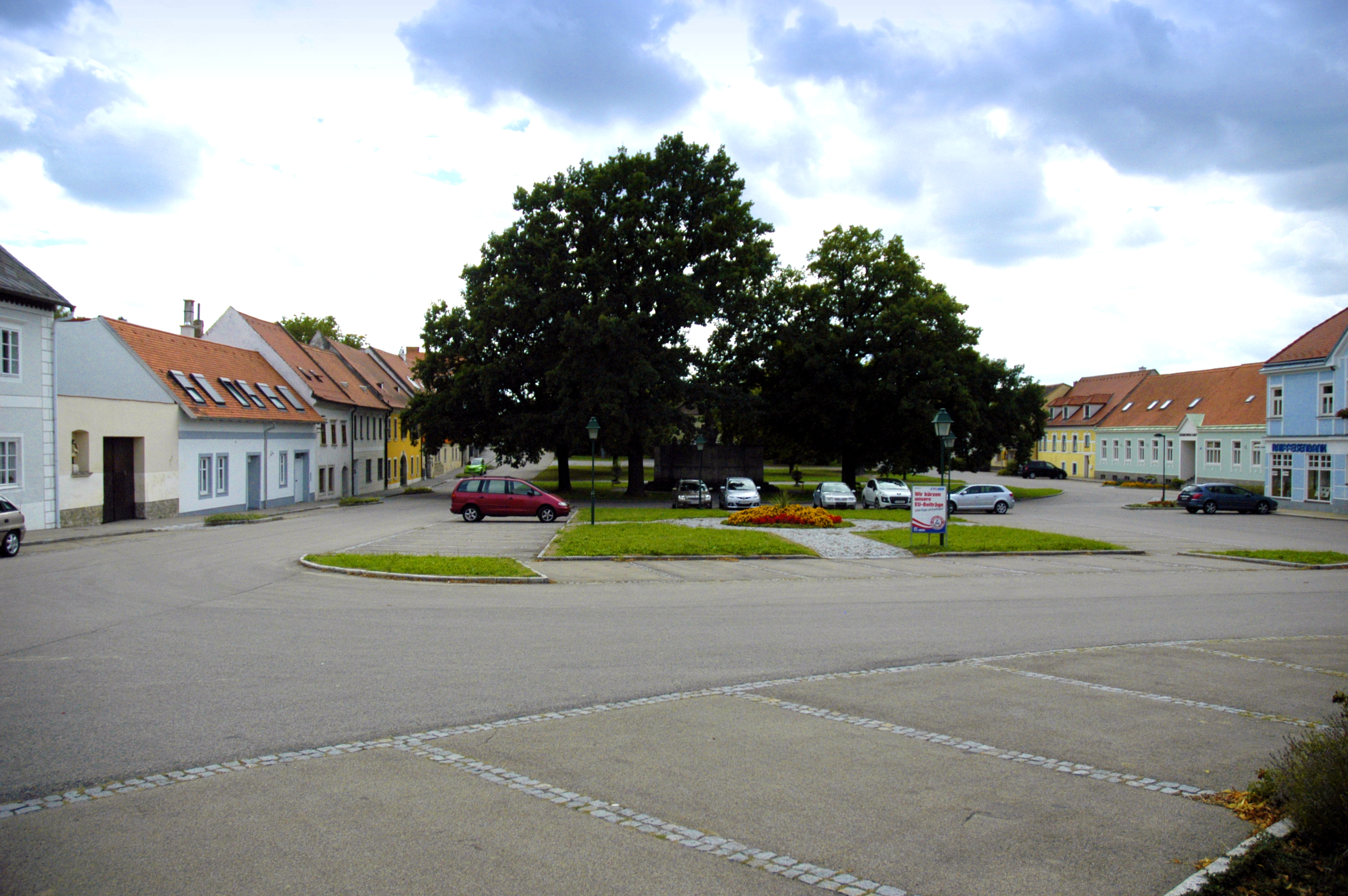
- Main square

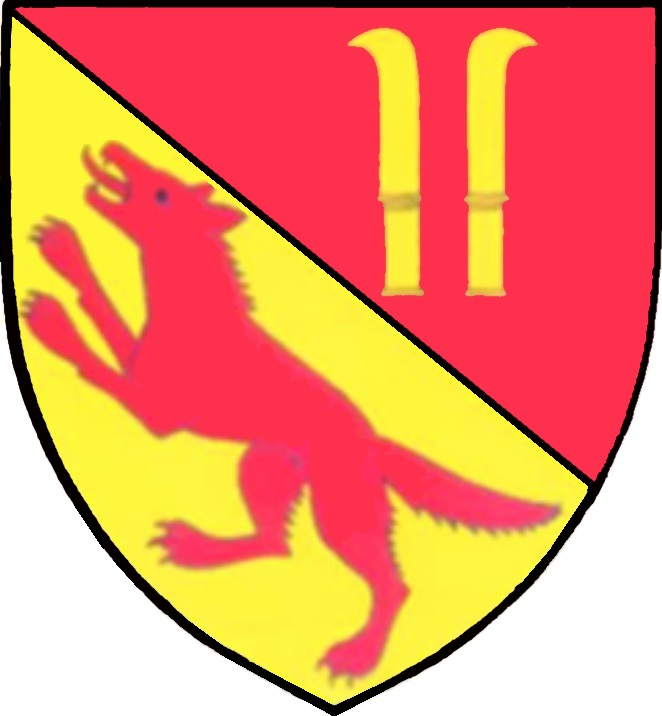
- Coat of arms

- Location within Austria
- Coordinates: 48°36′N 15°56′E
- Country: Austria
- State: Lower Austria
- District: Hollabrunn

Government
  - Mayor: Leopold Hummer

Area
  - Total: 61.85 km^{2} (23.88 sq mi)
- Elevation: 244 m (801 ft)

Population (2018-01-01)
  - Total: 2,162
  - Density: 34.96/km^{2} (90.53/sq mi)
- Time zone: UTC+1 (CET)
  - Summer (DST): UTC+2 (CEST)
- Postal code: 3714
- Area code: 02959
- Website: www.sitzendorf.at

Sitzendorf an der Schmida is a town in the district of Hollabrunn in Lower Austria, Austria.

== Geography ==
Sitzendorf an der Schmida lies on the Schmida River. About 6.59 percent of the municipality is forested.
