= Grabern =

- Municipality
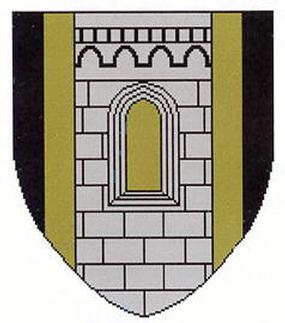
- Coat of arms

- Location within Austria
- Coordinates: 48°37′N 16°1′E
- Country: Austria
- State: Lower Austria
- District: Hollabrunn

Government
  - Mayor: Herbert Leeb

Area
  - Total: 30.94 km^{2} (11.95 sq mi)
- Elevation: 251 m (823 ft)

Population (2018-01-01)
  - Total: 1,642
  - Density: 53.07/km^{2} (137.5/sq mi)
- Time zone: UTC+1 (CET)
  - Summer (DST): UTC+2 (CEST)
- Postal code: 2020
- Area code: 02952

Grabern is a town in the district of Hollabrunn in Lower Austria, Austria.

== Population ==
Historical population
Year	Pop.	±%
1971	1,313	—
1981	1,203	−8.4%
1991	1,308	+8.7%
2001	1,357	+3.7%
2011	1,423	+4.9%
2021	1,734	+21.9%
