= Maissau =

- Municipality
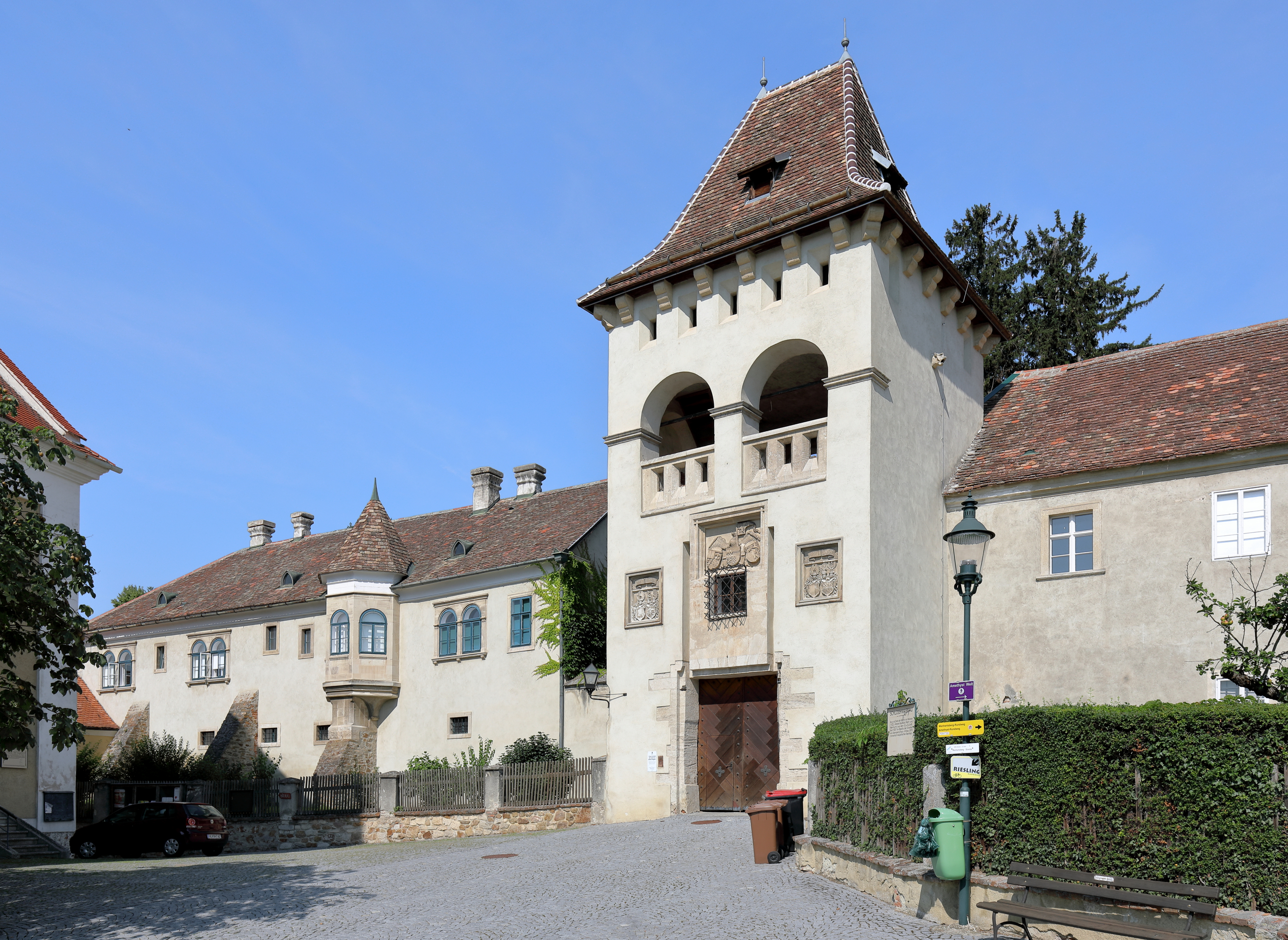
- Maissau Fortress

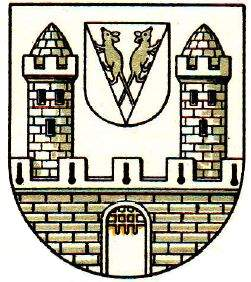
- Coat of arms

- Location within Austria
- Coordinates: 48°34′N 15°49′E
- Country: Austria
- State: Lower Austria
- District: Hollabrunn

Government
  - Mayor: Josef Klepp (ÖVP)

Area
  - Total: 43.14 km^{2} (16.66 sq mi)
- Elevation: 341 m (1,119 ft)

Population (2018-01-01)
  - Total: 1,946
  - Density: 45.11/km^{2} (116.8/sq mi)
- Time zone: UTC+1 (CET)
  - Summer (DST): UTC+2 (CEST)
- Postal code: 3712
- Area code: 02958
- Website: www.maissau.at

Maissau is a municipality in the district of Hollabrunn in Lower Austria, Austria.

The Villages of the municipality are: Eggendorf am Walde, Grübern, Gumping, Klein-Burgstall, Limberg, Maissau, Oberdürnbach, Reikersdorf, Unterdürnbach and Wilhelmsdorf.

== Population ==
Historical population
| Year | Pop. | ±% |
|---|---|---|
| 1869 | 2,858 | — |
| 1880 | 2,856 | −0.1% |
| 1890 | 2,862 | +0.2% |
| 1900 | 2,851 | −0.4% |
| 1910 | 2,836 | −0.5% |
| 1923 | 2,573 | −9.3% |
| 1934 | 2,528 | −1.7% |
| 1939 | 2,456 | −2.8% |
| 1951 | 2,456 | +0.0% |
| 1961 | 2,236 | −9.0% |
| 1971 | 2,131 | −4.7% |
| 1981 | 1,804 | −15.3% |
| 1991 | 1,778 | −1.4% |
| 2001 | 1,855 | +4.3% |
| 2011 | 1,877 | +1.2% |
| 2021 | 1,938 | +3.2% |
