= Falkenstein Castle (Lower Austria) =

Castle in Lower Austria

Coordinates: 48°43′27″N 16°34′44″E

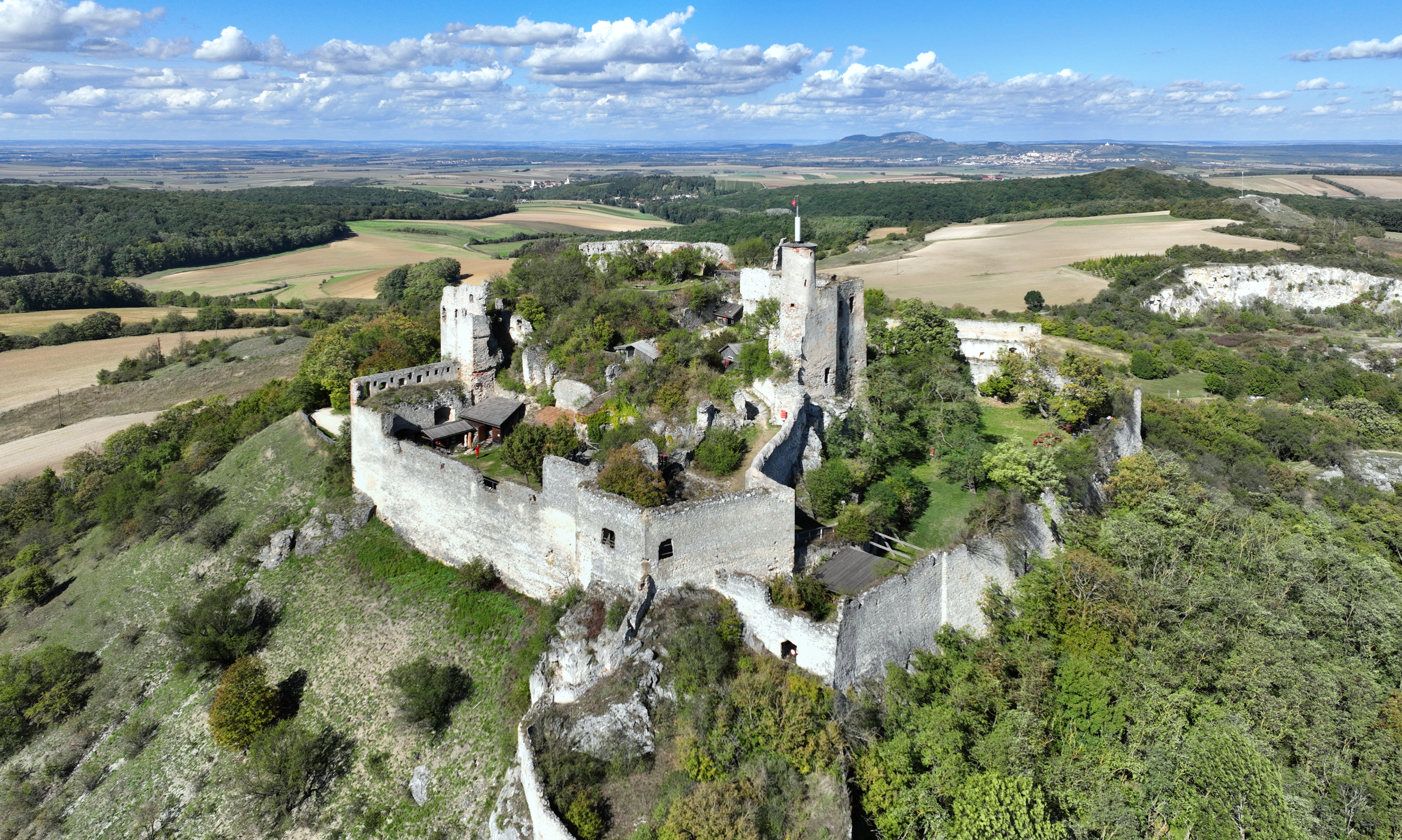
The ruins of Falkenstein Castle

The ruins of Falkenstein Castle (German: Burg Falkenstein) is in the Weinviertel region of Lower Austria, about 55 kilometres (34 mi) north of Vienna near the border to Czech Republic.

The castle was used as a "Reichsfeste", for the protection of the HRE Reich with an overview over nearly all of Moravia. It was founded around 1050 by Emperor Henry III. 1106 Leopold III, Margrave of Austria purchased the castle, from then on it was owned by the rulers of Austria. 1572 Maximilian II sold Falkenstein to the Baron (later Count) of Trautson.

In 1645, in the last period of the Thirty Years' War Falkenstein was conquered by Swedish forces, but not destroyed. Its decay began at the end of the 17th century, when the castle was dismantled by the owners themselves in order to re-use the material.

During the summer season, the inner ward is turned into an impressive site for medieval feasts and theatre plays.

== Sources ==
- Falko Daim (ed.), 2005: Burgen – Weinviertel (pp. 96–100). Vienna: Verlag Freytag & Berndt ISBN 3-7079-0713-9
- Ilse Schöndorfer, 1999: Steine und Sagen – Burgruinen in Niederösterreich (pp. 247–250). St.Pölten–Wien: Verlag Niederösterreichisches Pressehaus ISBN 3-85326-114-0
- Johannes-Wolfgang Neugebauer, Friedrich Parisch, Spiridon Verginis, 1995: Burgruine Falkenstein in: Fundberichte aus Österreich, Band 34
- NÖ-Burgen online: Burgruine Falkenstein
- Burgen-Austria.com: Falkenstein (Weinviertel) - Burgruine
