= Schrattenthal =

- Municipality
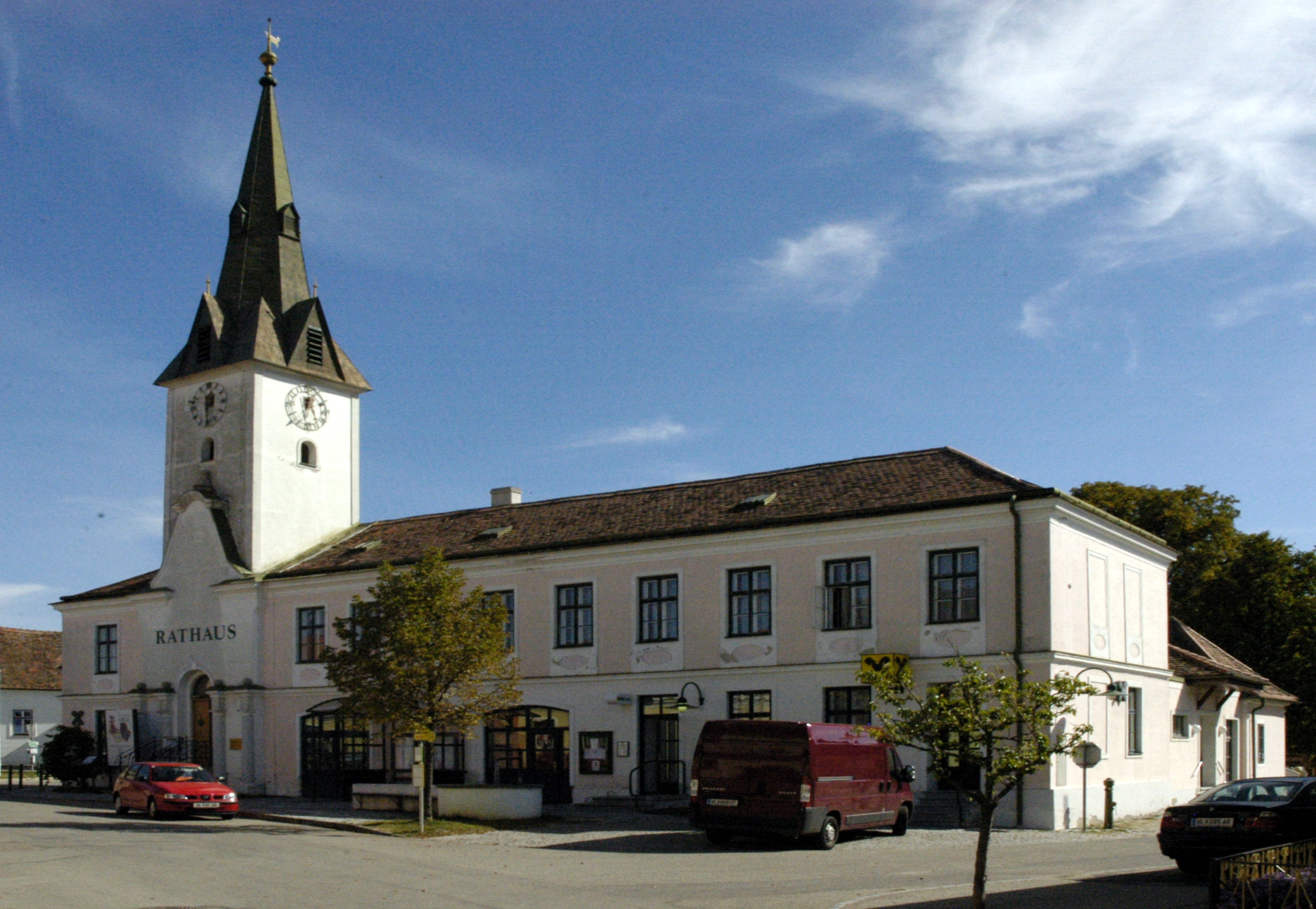
- Town hall

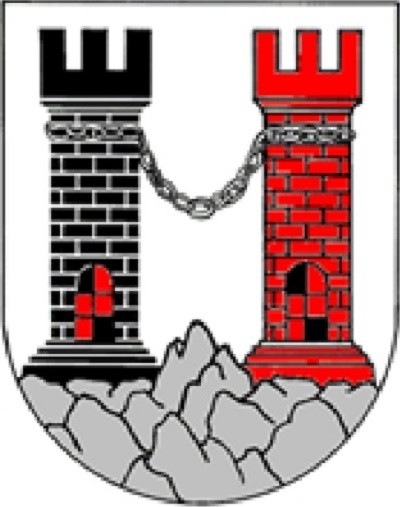
- Coat of arms

- Location within Austria
- Coordinates: 48°43′N 15°54′E
- Country: Austria
- State: Lower Austria
- District: Hollabrunn

Government
  - Mayor: Werner Grolly

Area
  - Total: 22.44 km^{2} (8.66 sq mi)
- Elevation: 289 m (948 ft)

Population (2018-01-01)
  - Total: 868
  - Density: 38.7/km^{2} (100/sq mi)
- Time zone: UTC+1 (CET)
  - Summer (DST): UTC+2 (CEST)
- Postal code: 2073
- Area code: 02946
- Website: www.schrattenthal.at

Schrattenthal is a town in the district of Hollabrunn in Lower Austria, Austria.

== Population ==
Historical population
Year	Pop.	±%
1869	1,468	—
1880	1,467	−0.1%
1890	1,392	−5.1%
1900	1,495	+7.4%
1910	1,495	+0.0%
1923	1,414	−5.4%
1934	1,502	+6.2%
1939	1,452	−3.3%
1951	1,421	−2.1%
1961	1,157	−18.6%
1971	1,092	−5.6%
1981	991	−9.2%
1991	940	−5.1%
2001	879	−6.5%
2011	862	−1.9%
2021	894	+3.7%
