= Hollabrunn District =

Coordinates: 48.649°N 16.017°E

Hollabrunn District Bezirk Hollabrunn
- District
- Country: Austria
- State: Lower Austria
- Number of municipalities: 24
- Administrative seat: Hollabrunn

Government
  - District Governor: Karl-Josef Weiss

Area
  - Total: 1,010.7 km^{2} (390.2 sq mi)

Population (2024)
  - Total: 52,058
  - Density: 51.507/km^{2} (133.40/sq mi)
- Time zone: UTC+01:00 (CET)
  - Summer (DST): UTC+02:00 (CEST)
- Vehicle registration: HL
- NUTS code: AT125
- District code: 310

Bezirk Hollabrunn is a district of the state of Lower Austria in Austria.

== Municipalities ==
Towns (Städte) are indicated in boldface; market towns (Marktgemeinden) in italics; suburbs, hamlets and other subdivisions of a municipality are indicated in small characters.

- Alberndorf im Pulkautal
- Göllersdorf
  - Bergau, Eitzersthal, Furth, Göllersdorf, Großstelzendorf, Obergrub, Oberparschenbrunn, Porrau, Schönborn, Untergrub, Viendorf, Wischathal
- Grabern
  - Mittergrabern, Obergrabern, Ober-Steinabrunn, Schöngrabern, Windpassing
- Guntersdorf
  - Großnondorf, Guntersdorf
- Hadres
  - Hadres, Obritz, Untermarkersdorf
- **Hardegg**
  - Felling, Hardegg, Heufurth, Mallersbach, Merkersdorf, Niederfladnitz, Pleißing, Riegersburg, Waschbach
- Haugsdorf
  - Auggenthal, Haugsdorf, Jetzelsdorf, Kleinhaugsdorf
- Heldenberg
  - Glaubendorf, Großwetzdorf, Kleinwetzdorf, Oberthern, Unterthern
- Hohenwarth-Mühlbach am Manhartsberg
  - Bösendürnbach, Ebersbrunn, Hohenwarth, Mühlbach am Manhartsberg, Olbersdorf, Ronthal, Zemling
- **Hollabrunn**
  - Altenmarkt im Thale, Aspersdorf, Breitenwaida, Dietersdorf, Eggendorf im Thale, Enzersdorf im Thale, Groß Hollabrunn, Kleedorf, Kleinkadolz, Kleinstelzendorf, Kleinstetteldorf, Magersdorf, Mariathal, Oberfellabrunn, Puch, Raschala, Sonnberg, Suttenbrunn, Weyerburg, Wieselsfeld, Wolfsbrunn
- Mailberg
  - Mailberg, Eggendorf am Walde, Grübern, Gumping, Klein-Burgstall, Limberg, Maissau, Oberdürnbach, Reikersdorf, Unterdürnbach, Wilhelmsdorf
- **Maissau**
- Nappersdorf-Kammersdorf
  - Dürnleis, Haslach, Kammersdorf, Kleinsierndorf, Kleinweikersdorf, Nappersdorf
- Pernersdorf
  - Karlsdorf, Peigarten, Pernersdorf, Pfaffendorf, Ragelsdorf
- **Pulkau**
  - Groß-Reipersdorf, Leodagger, Passendorf, Pulkau, Rafing, Rohrendorf an der Pulkau, Dopinghofen
- Ravelsbach
  - Baierdorf, Gaindorf, Minichhofen, Oberravelsbach, Parisdorf, Pfaffstetten, Ravelsbach
- **Retz**
  - Hofern, Kleinhöflein, Kleinriedenthal, Obernalb, Retz, Unternalb
- Retzbach
  - Mitterretzbach, Oberretzbach, Unterretzbach
- **Schrattenthal**
  - Obermarkersdorf, Schrattenthal, Waitzendorf
- Seefeld-Kadolz
  - Großkadolz, Seefeld
- Sitzendorf an der Schmida
  - Braunsdorf, Frauendorf an der Schmida, Goggendorf, Kleinkirchberg, Niederschleinz, Pranhartsberg, Roseldorf, Sitzendorf an der Schmida, Sitzenhart
- Wullersdorf
  - Aschendorf, Grund, Hart, Hetzmannsdorf, Immendorf, Kalladorf, Maria Roggendorf, Oberstinkenbrunn, Schalladorf, Wullersdorf
- Zellerndorf
  - Deinzendorf, Dietmannsdorf, Pillersdorf, Platt, Watzelsdorf, Zellerndorf
- Ziersdorf
  - Dippersdorf, Fahndorf, Gettsdorf, Großmeiseldorf, Hollenstein, Kiblitz, Radlbrunn, Rohrbach, Ziersdorf
