= Pulkau =

- Municipality
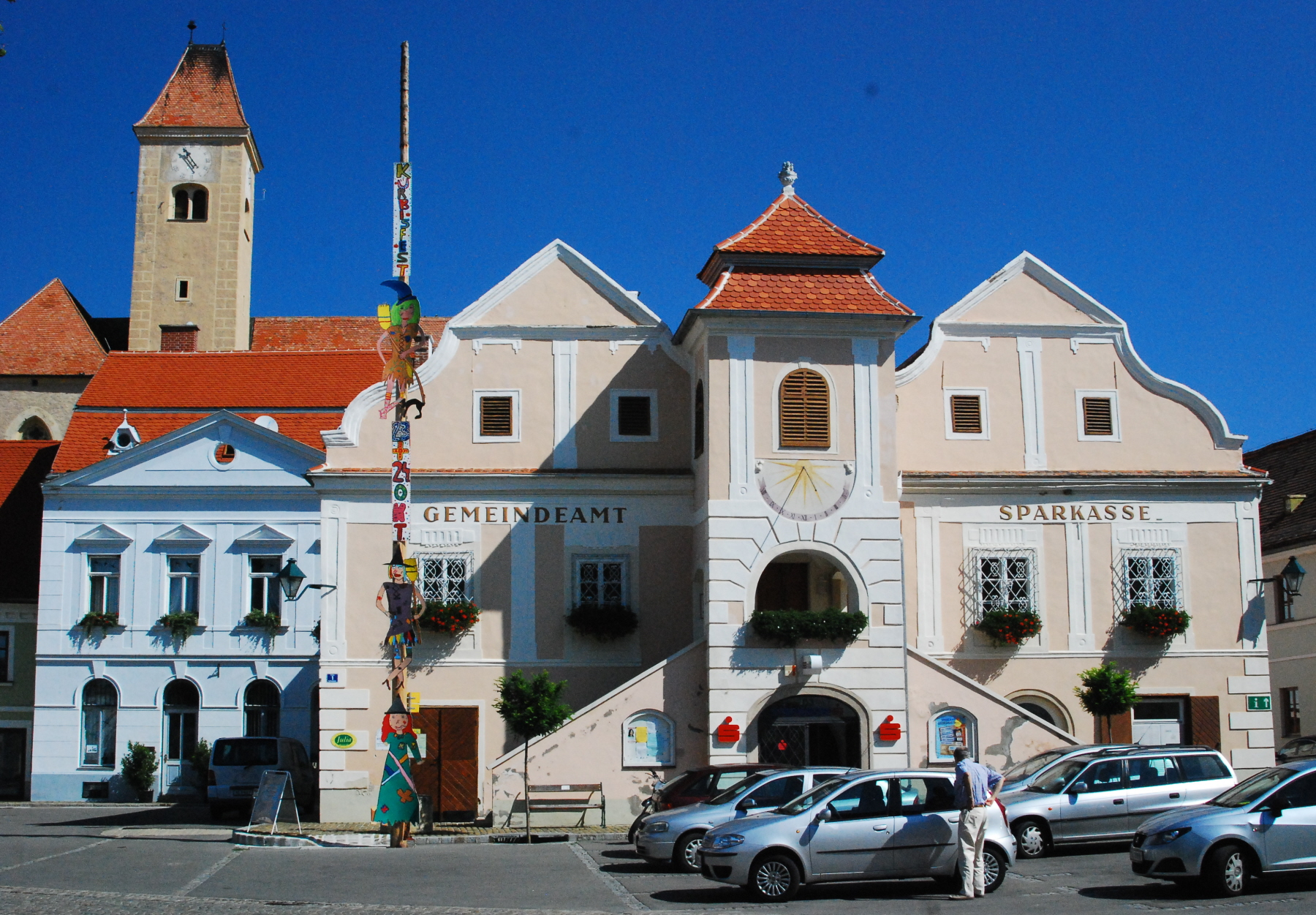
- Town hall

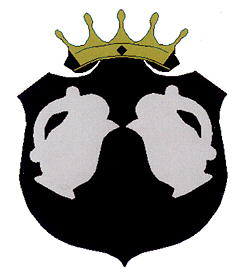
- Coat of arms

- Location within Austria
- Coordinates: 48°42′N 15°51′E
- Country: Austria
- State: Lower Austria
- District: Hollabrunn

Government
  - Mayor: Leo Ramharter (ÖVP)

Area
  - Total: 36.73 km^{2} (14.18 sq mi)
- Elevation: 289 m (948 ft)

Population (2018-01-01)
  - Total: 1,560
  - Density: 42.5/km^{2} (110/sq mi)
- Time zone: UTC+1 (CET)
  - Summer (DST): UTC+2 (CEST)
- Postal code: 3741
- Area code: 02946
- Website: www.pulkau.gv.at

Pulkau (Czech: Pulkava) is a city in the district of Hollabrunn in Lower Austria, Austria.

== Population ==
Historical population
Year	Pop.	±%
1869	3,237	—
1880	3,258	+0.6%
1890	3,276	+0.6%
1900	3,199	−2.4%
1910	3,027	−5.4%
1923	2,691	−11.1%
1934	2,746	+2.0%
1939	2,556	−6.9%
1951	2,560	+0.2%
1961	2,191	−14.4%
1971	1,922	−12.3%
1981	1,717	−10.7%
1991	1,680	−2.2%
2001	1,568	−6.7%
2011	1,576	+0.5%

== People ==
- Walter Ullmann, Jewish historian, born here.
