= Weinviertel =

Subdivision of the region of Lower Austria

Coordinates: 48.477906°N 16.513932°E

The Weinviertel (Austrian German: [ˈvaɪnˌfɪrtl̩]; English: "Wine Quarter") or Viertel unter dem Manhartsberg ; "Area below the Manhartsberg" is located in the northeast of Lower Austria.

In the east, the Weinviertel borders Slovakia at the Morava River. In the south, it borders Mostviertel and Industrieviertel, its limits being the Wagram, the Danube and the Marchfeld. Its western neighbor is Waldviertel, the traditional border being the Manhartsberg. In the north, the Weinviertel is adjacent to the Czech Republic, more specifically Moravia. The river Thaya runs back and forth across the border.

== Viticulture ==
The name Weinviertel is derived from viticulture; it is Austria's largest wine growing area. The most important grape varieties are:

- Grüner Veltliner
- Pinot blanc
- Welschriesling
- Zweigelt
- Blauer Portugieser

== Geography ==
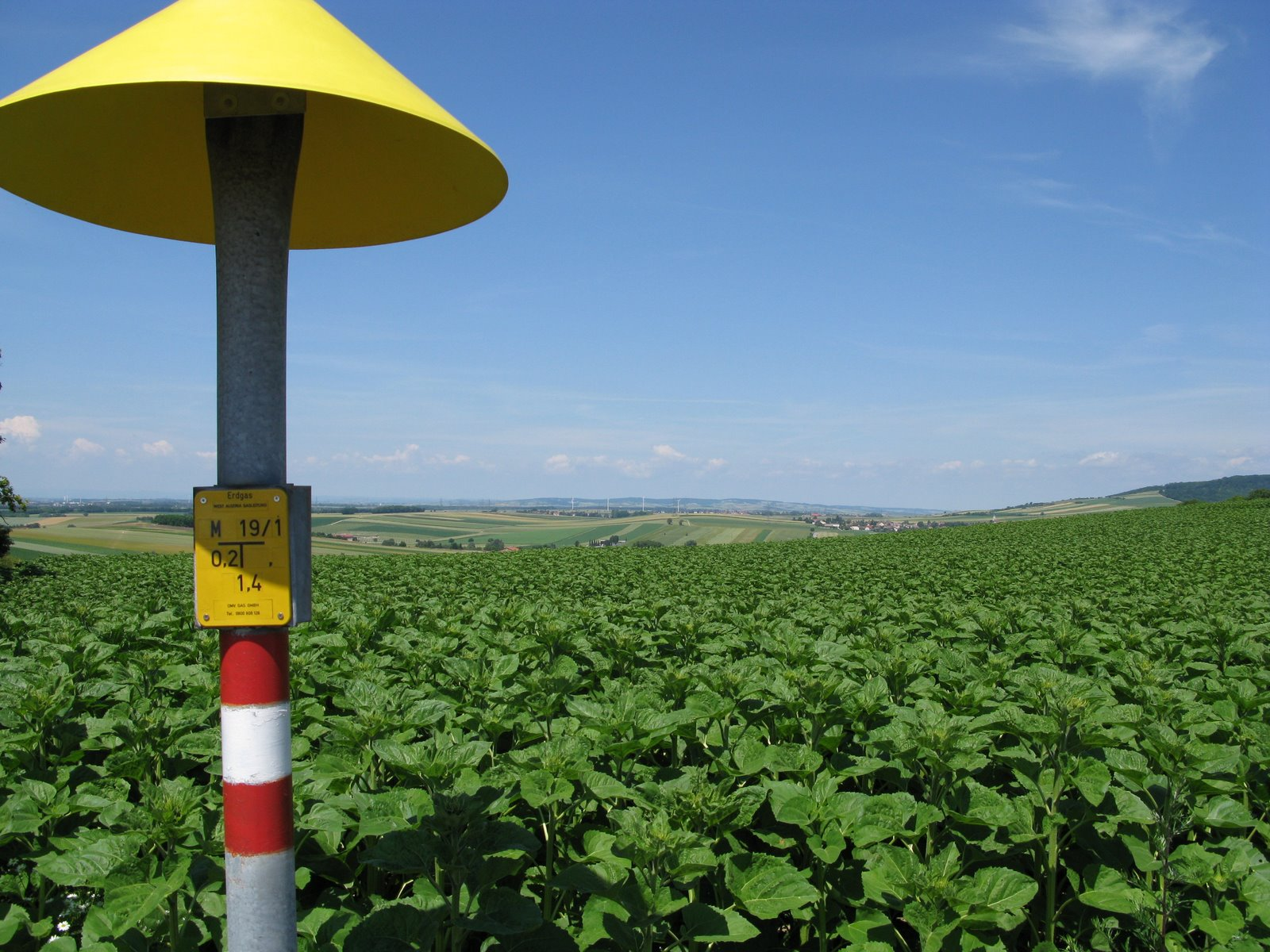
Near Oberrohrbach

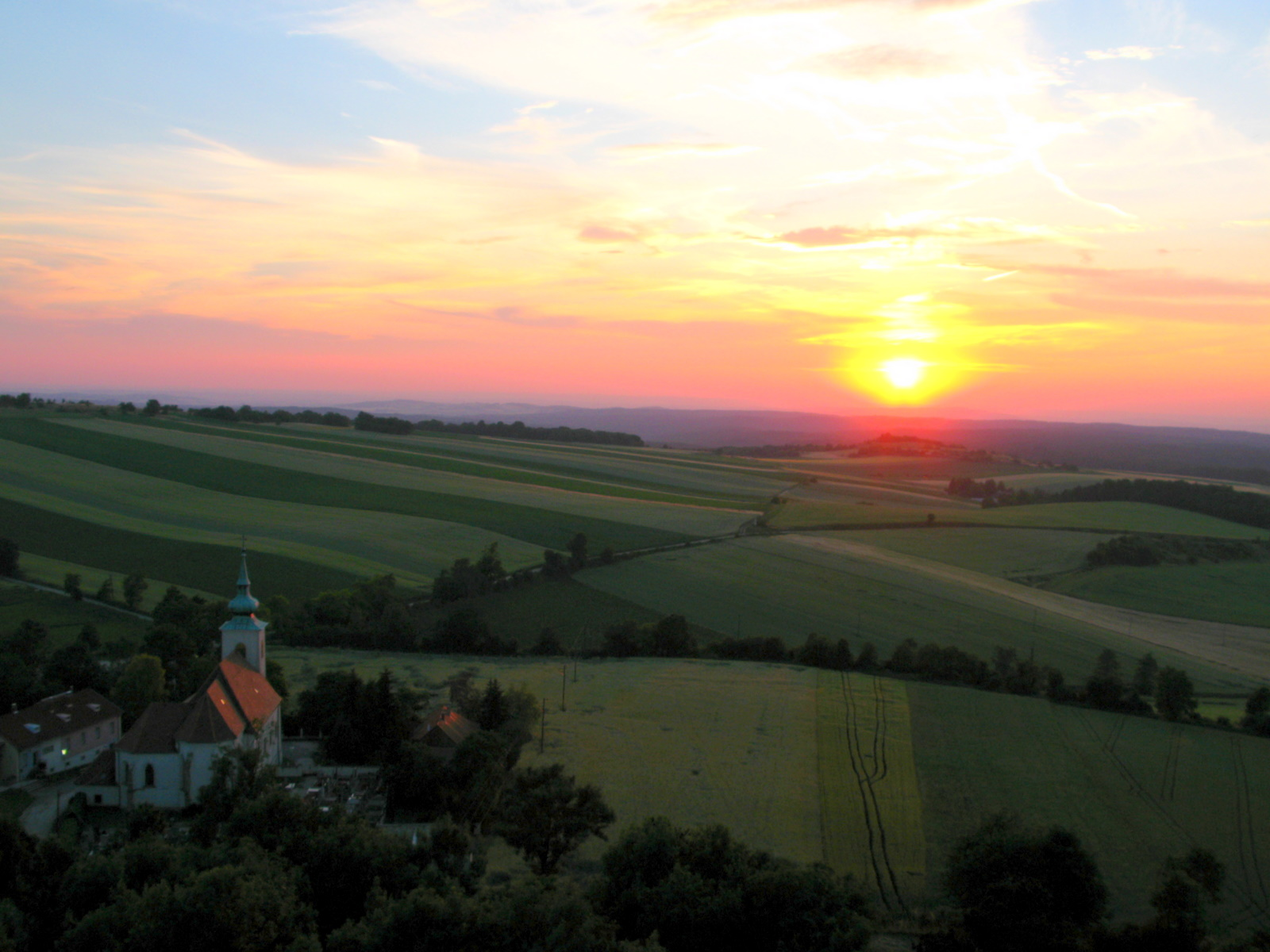
Oberleis

Other important rivers are Göllersbach, Hamelbach, Pulkau, Rußbach, Schmida, Waidenbach, Weidenbach and Zaya.

Beside viticulture and agriculture, other industries contribute to the Weinviertel economy. Most notably, there are some oil fields in its eastern part, which are exploited by OMV and located in the "oil communities" of Neusiedl an der Zaya, Zistersdorf, Matzen, Auersthal and Prottes.

Important rail connections are Franz Josef Railway, the North railway and the East railway.

== Districts ==
The following administrative districts of Lower Austria are considered to be parts of the Weinviertel

- Gänserndorf
- Hollabrunn
- Korneuburg
- Mistelbach
- The court district of Kirchberg am Wagram, which is part of the administrative district of Tulln)

== Culture ==
- Vino Versum Poysdorf
- Museumsdorf Niedersulz
- Falkenstein Castle
- Burg Kreuzenstein
