= Breitenlee =

Part of Donaustadt, Vienna, Austria

Coordinates: 48°15′4″N 16°29′51″E

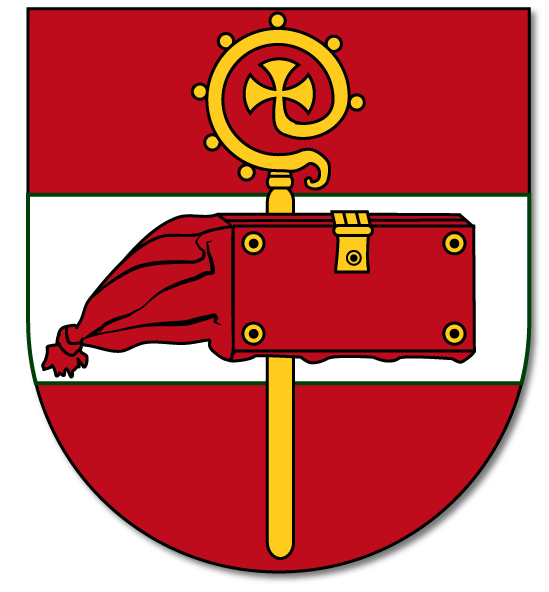
Coat of arms

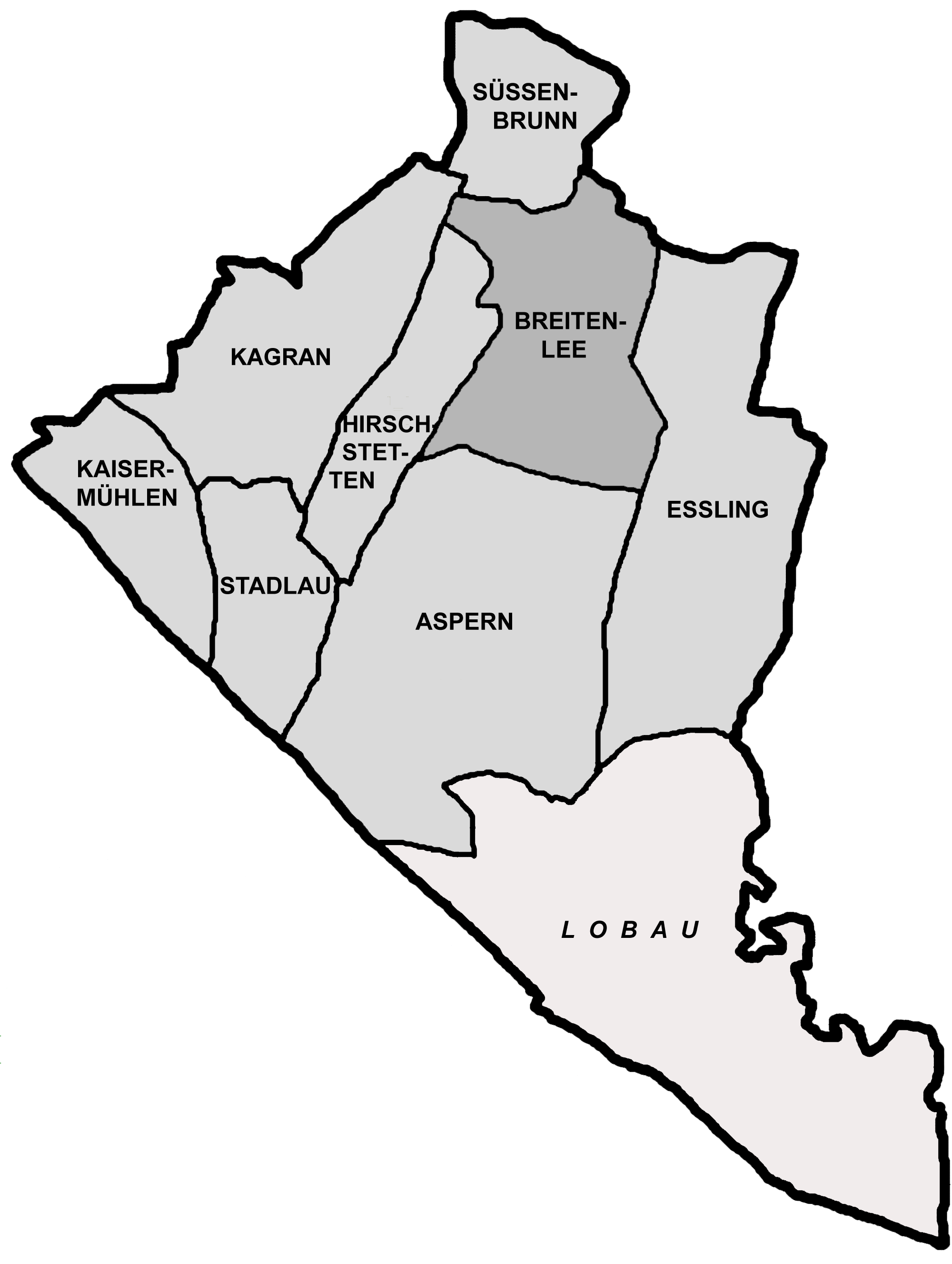
Location within Donaustadt

Breitenlee is a neighbourhood in Vienna, Austria, within Donaustadt, the 22nd district of Vienna. It has a population of 16,586 and covers 10.07 km^{2}.

== History ==
Breitenlee has likely existed as a village in the western Marchfeld since the 12th century. In 1529, the village was destroyed during the Ottoman Siege of Vienna, remaining abandoned for over a century. The village was rebuilt in the 1690s, and the parish church, dedicated to St. Anne, was completed in 1699.

In the following years, the village was repeatedly attacked by the Kuruc, Hungarian anti-Habsburg insurgents, and the plague ravaged the area in 1713. During the Battle of Aspern-Essling against Napoleon in 1809, the Austrian Grenadier Reserve stood near Breitenlee and helped secure the victory under Archduke Charles.

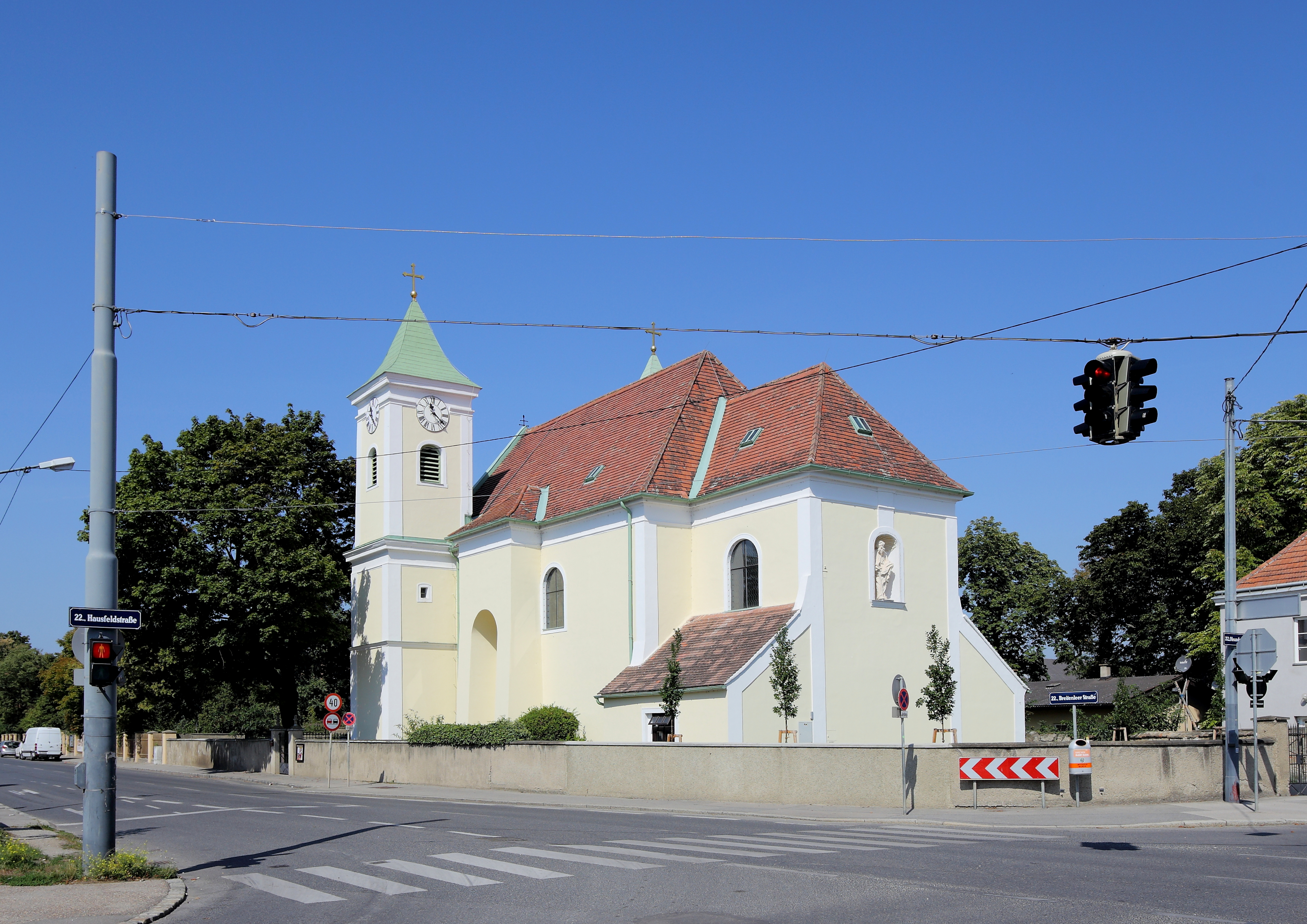
Breitenlee church

In 1938, the village was incorporated into the new 22nd district, then called Groß-Enzersdorf, which became part of the expanded Greater Vienna. Since 1954, it has been part of the smaller 22nd district, now called Donaustadt, along with seven other municipalities.

== Geography ==
Breitenlee borders four other parts of Donaustadt: Süßenbrunn, Essling, Aspern, Hirschstetten, and Kagran, as well as Aderklaa in Lower Austria. Covering an area of 10.07 km^{2}, it is the fifth largest of Donaustadt's nine communities.

Breitenlee offers a mix of single-family homes, terraced houses, and apartment blocks.

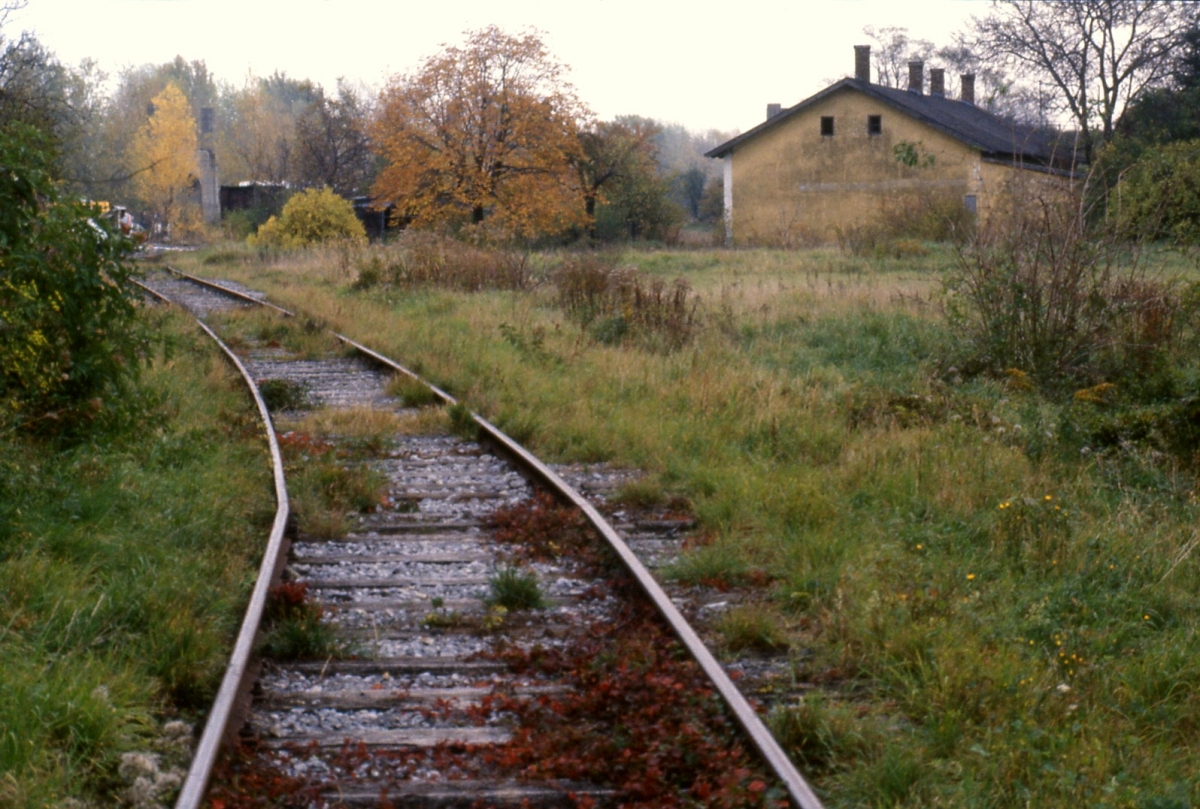
The former marshalling yard, 1986

== Features ==
Breitenlee is home to the Wien Aspern Nord railway station, serving REX, S-Bahn, and U-Bahn U2, as well as the Hausfeldstraße station also on the U2.

The Norbert Scheed Forest, named after the former district mayor of Donaustadt, runs through the north of the town. The forest includes the Russwasser and the Paischenwasser, two swimmable lakes.

The former Breitenlee marshalling yard is home to endangered plant and animal species, including red-backed shrikes, hoopoes, sand lizards, over 140 wild bee species, and orchids. To preserve its biodiversity, the City of Vienna has acquired 70 hectares from the ÖBB to manage as an EU conservation area. The project will remove invasive plants and create new habitats for reptiles and amphibians.
