= Stadlau =

Part of Donaustadt, Vienna, Austria

Coordinates: 48°13′10″N 16°27′54″E

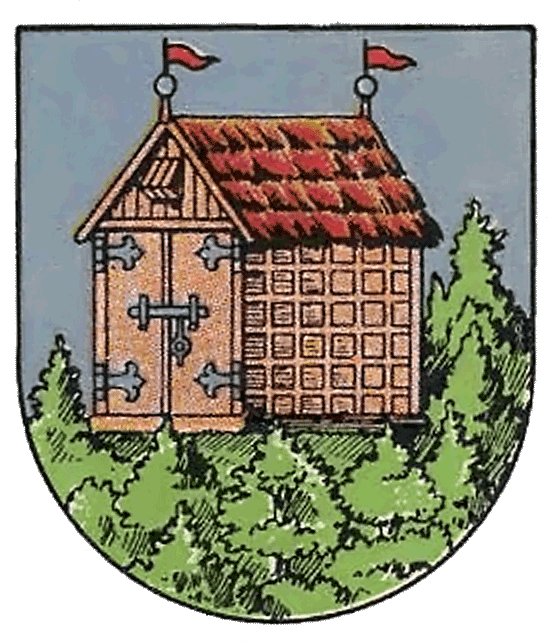
Coat of arms

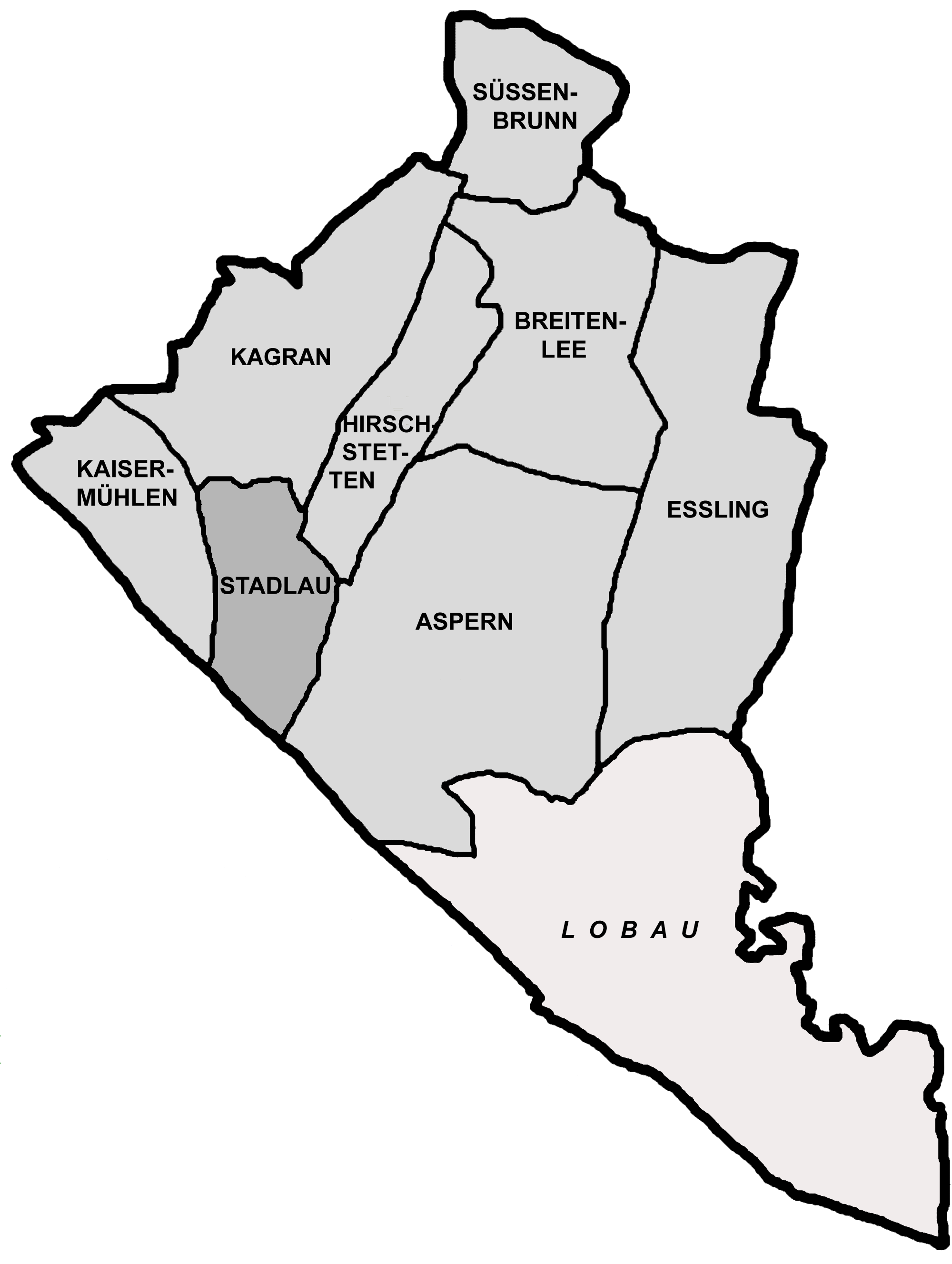
Location within Donaustadt

Stadlau (Austrian German pronunciation: [ʃtadˈlaʊ]) is a neighbourhood in Vienna, Austria, within Donaustadt, the 22nd district of Vienna. It has a population of 16.152 and covers 4.99 km^{2}.

== History ==
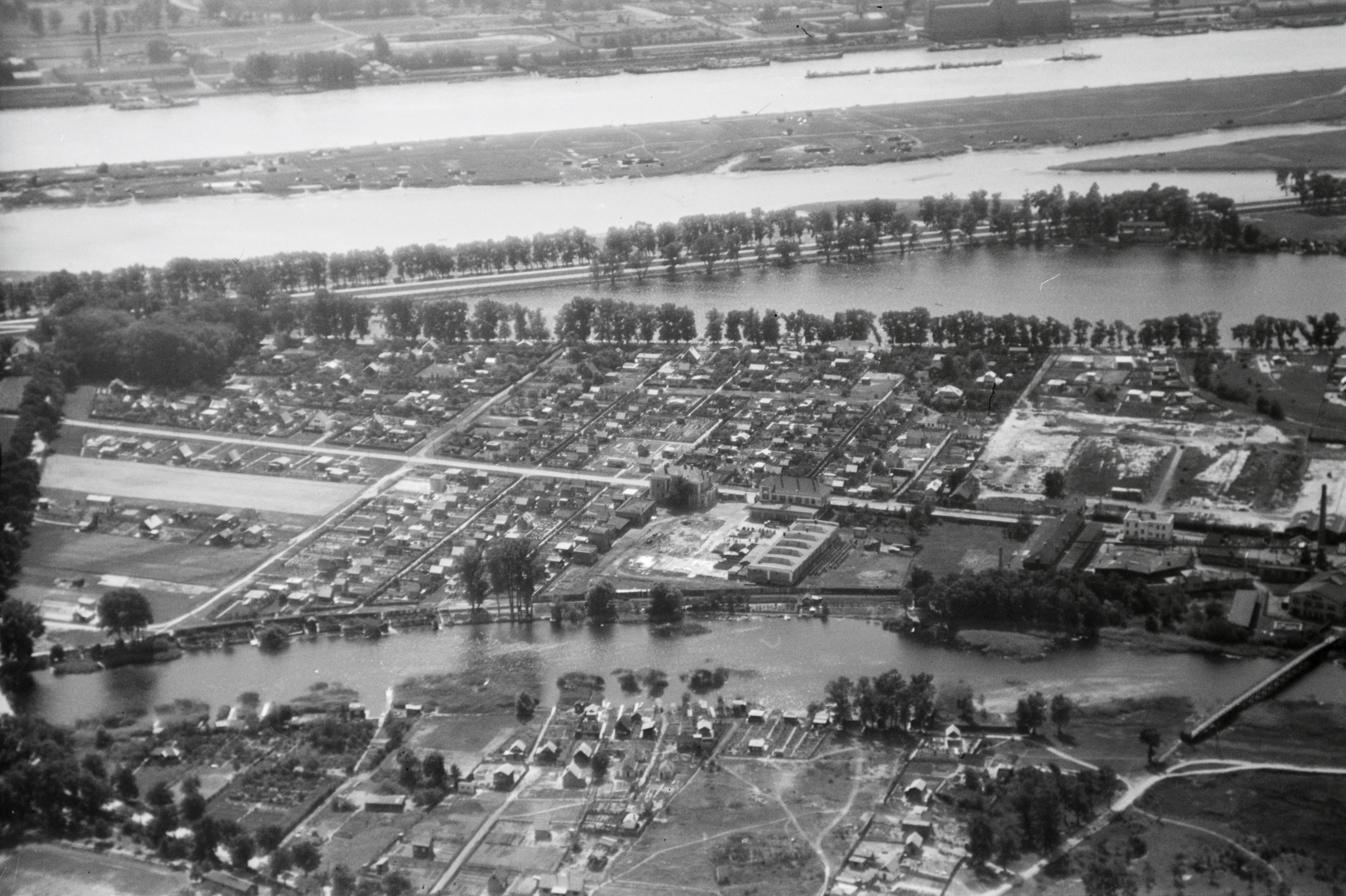
Stadlau between the New Danube and the Mühlwasser, 1935

Stadlau was first recorded in 1150 as "Stadelouve," meaning "barn in the floodplain." Originally a fief of the Babenbergs, it was home to wealthy farmers who controlled the fertile land between the Danube and the Prater. Its strategic location in the Marchfeld made it an important crossing point, with a ferry connecting it to the city. In 1160, a parish church was built to serve the surrounding villages. However, a devastating flood in 1438 destroyed much of the settlement.

By around 1820, Stadlau had developed into a small linear village with just 10 to 15 houses. The Danube regulation of the 1870s transformed the landscape, drying up nearby tributaries. The opening of Stadlau railway station in 1870 marked the beginning of industrial growth, and a cemetery was established in 1875.

In 1904, Stadlau was incorporated into Vienna as a part of the newly created 21st district, Floridsdorf. A new church, completed in 1924, became an independent parish in 1940. Following Austria’s annexation by Nazi Germany in 1938, Stadlau was absorbed into the expanded 22nd district, Groß-Enzersdorf. In 1954, the district was reorganized, establishing its present-day borders and adopting the name Donaustadt.

== Geography ==
Stadlau borders four other Katastralgemeinden of Donaustadt: Kaisermühlen, Kagran, Hirschstetten, and Aspern. Covering an area of 4.99 km^{2}, it is the smallest part of Donaustadt.

Its area includes part of the Old Danube and the New Danube, as well ast the Donauinsel. Three bridges link Stadlau to the other side of the river: Stadlauer Brücke, Praterbrücke, and Donaustadtbrücke. Additionally, the weir across the New Danube serves as a crossing for pedestrians and cyclists.

== Features ==
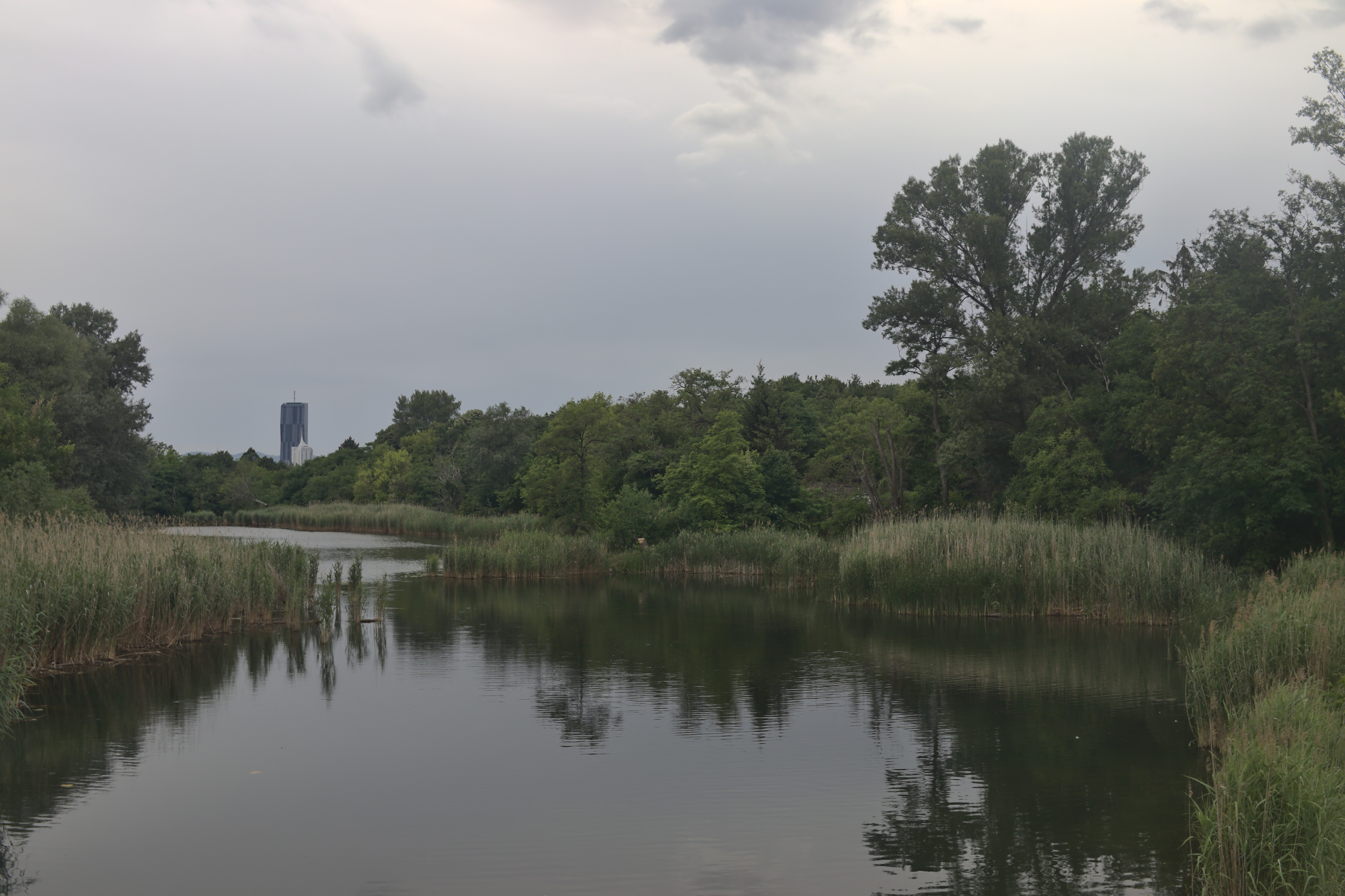
The Mühlwasser with the DC Tower 1 and the Hochhaus Neue Donau in the background

Stadlau is home to two major sports clubs: WAT Stadlau, a multi-sport club founded in 1914, and FC Stadlau, a football club established in 1913. The area also hosts one of Vienna’s three gurdwaras, Sikh temples.

The settlement features both the Old Danube, an oxbow lake, and the New Danube, both of which are swimmable. The Old Danube is a popular spot for water activities, including wakeboarding and pedal boating, Additionally, the Mühlwasser, a network of former Danube tributaries, flows through the area.

Stadlau is well-connected by public transport, with three metro stations on the U2 line: Donaustadtbrücke, Stadlau, and Hardeggasse. Stadlau station also serves as a railway hub, offering S-Bahn connections and access to the Laaer Ostbahn and Marchegger Ostbahn lines.

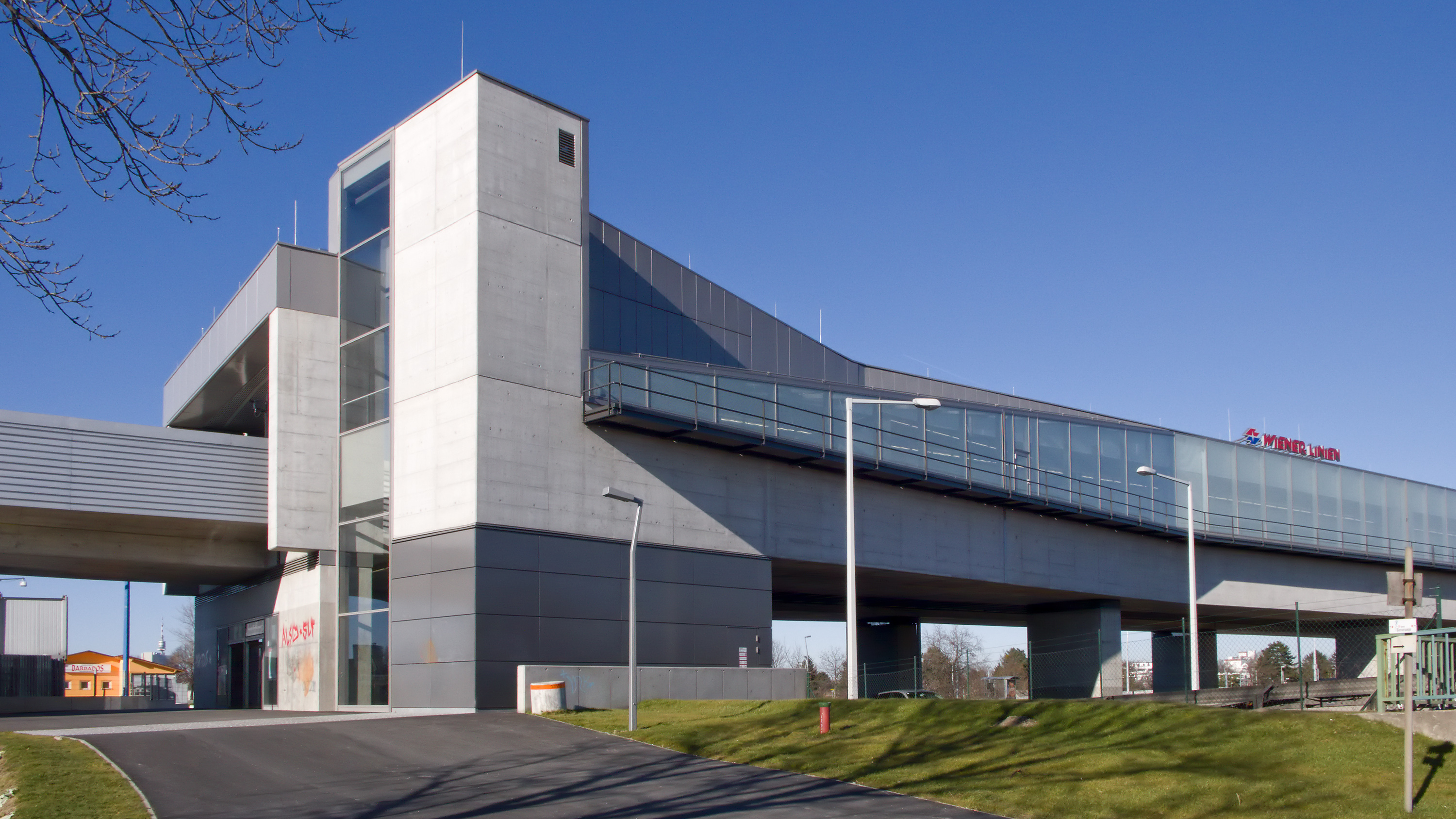
U-Bahn-Station Donaustadtbrücke
