= Yung Hurn =

Austrian rapper

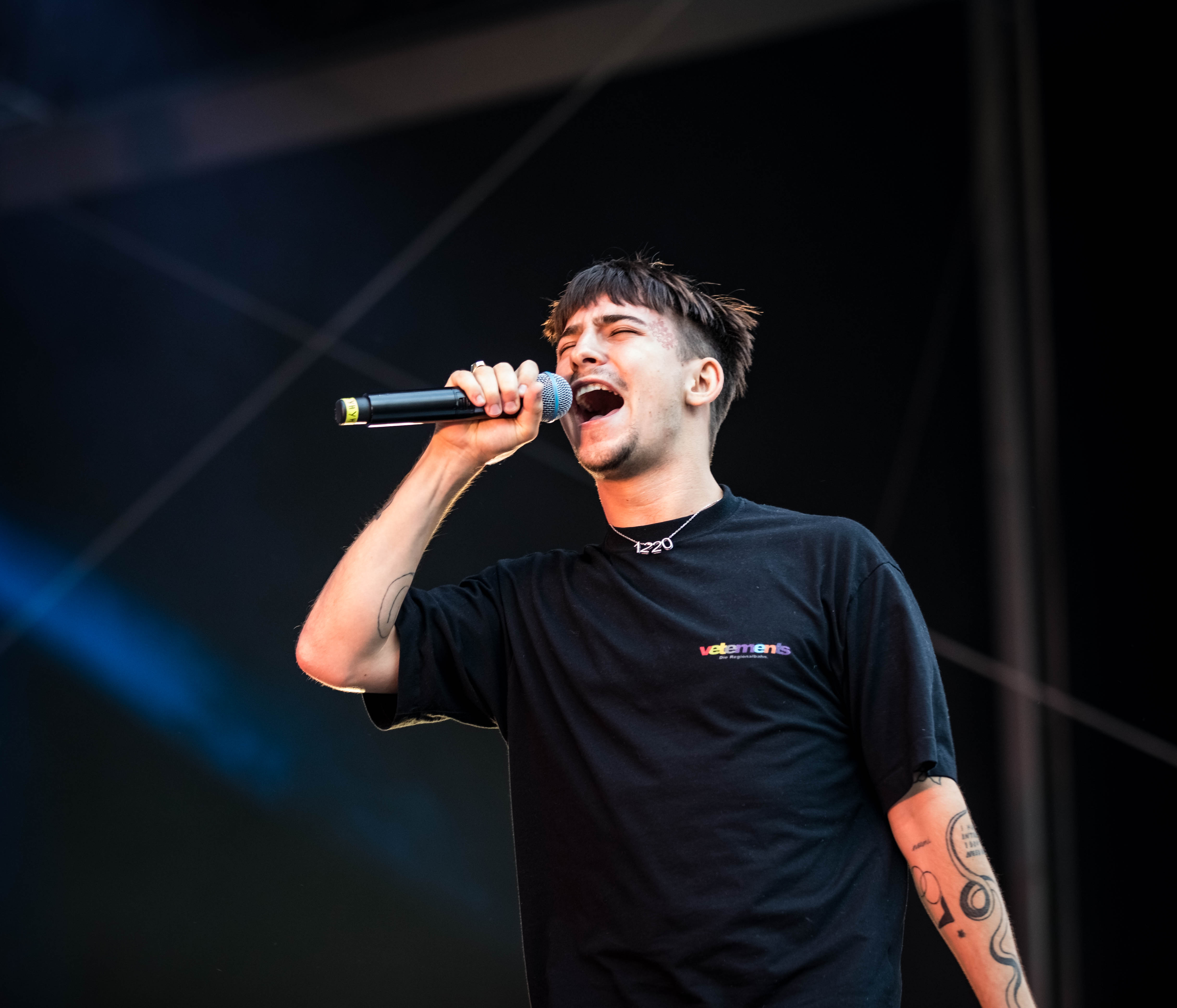

Background information
- Also known as: K. Ronaldo
- Born: Julian Sellmeister; January 18, 1995 (age 31); Donaustadt, Vienna, Austria
- Genres: Cloud rap; hip hop; R&B; Synth-pop
- Occupations: Singer-songwriter; rapper
- Years active: 2014–present
- Label: Live From Earth
- Member of: Love Hotel Band

Julian Sellmeister, also known as Yung Hurn (born 18 January 1995) is an Austrian hip-hop-musician from the Viennese district Donaustadt. Since 2016 he has also appeared under the name of K. Ronaldo as a fictitious older brother of himself, with the K. standing either for Kristallo or for Kristus. He was part of the Berlin-based artist collective Live From Earth. He released several mixtapes and albums, his last being "Crazy Horse Club mixtape vol.1" in 2022.

== Life ==
Yung Hurn originates from the Viennese district Hirschstetten in the 22nd district Donaustadt. In his youth (up to U15) he played football for SV Hirschstetten. In 2014, the high school dropout got to know the Viennese rapper Rap4Fikk and shortly thereafter began rapping himself. Together with the Producer Lex Lugner Yung Hurn recorded the EP Wiener Linien in 2015. In July, he released his debut Mixtape 22, whose track Nein was voted one of the top 10 best national music tracks of the year by readers of the German hip-hop magazine Juice.

2016 followed the Krocha Tape and under the name K. Ronaldo the mixtape I Wanted to Kill Myself but Today is my Mothers Birthday. Furthermore, Yung Hurn released together with the German rapper RIN the independent single Bianco. This was intended for the joint album Mafia der Liebe, the release of which is uncertain after RIN's retirement, and was voted single of the year in the Juice annual charts.

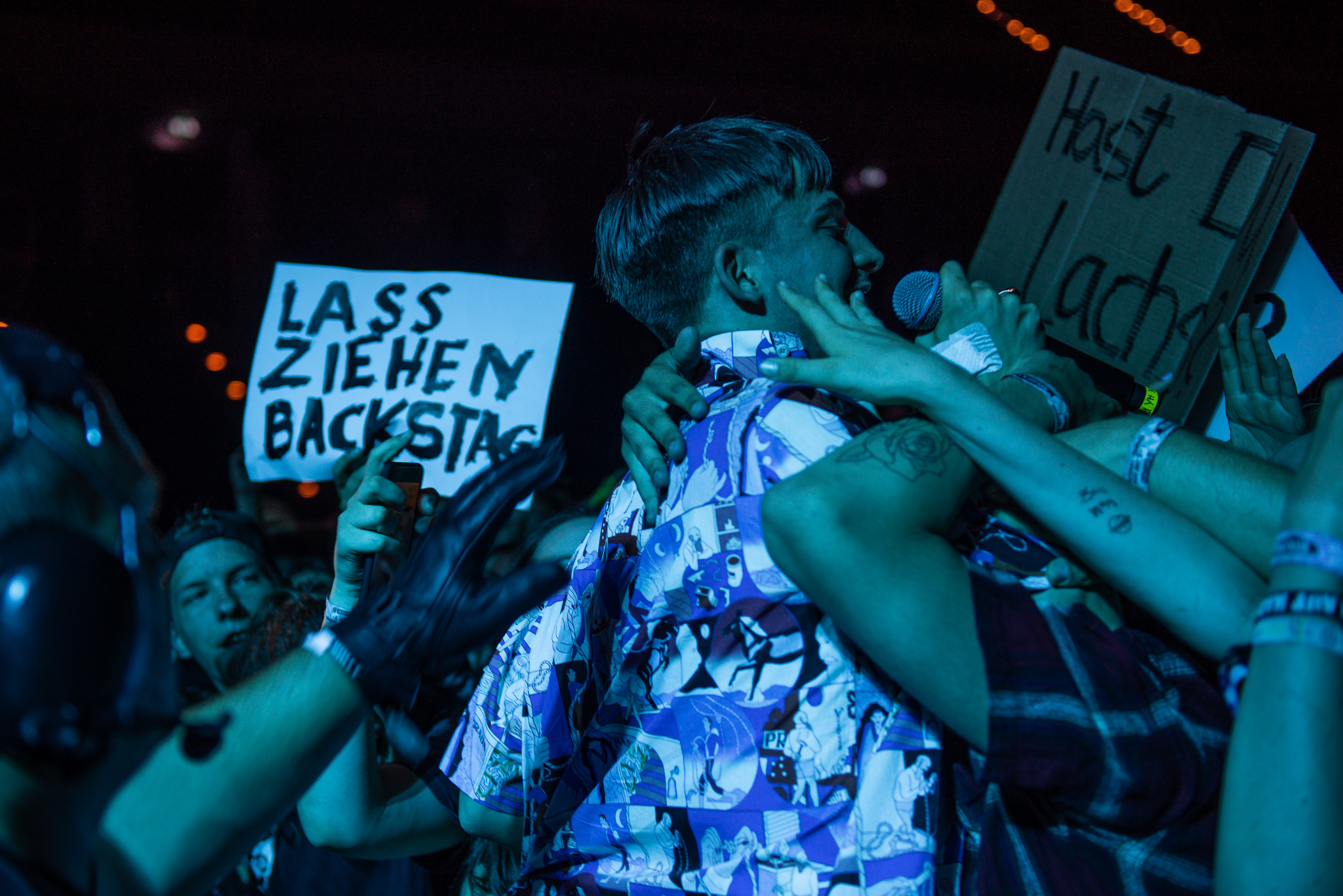
Yung Hurn with fans at Rock im Park in Nürnberg (2018)

On December 23, 2016, the compilation In Memory of Yung Hurn – Classic Compilation was released, the first release of which could only be purchased digitally and streamed on popular portals. The album also received a limited vinyl edition in June 2017. In 2015, Yung Hurn had declared that his music would always be available for free download. In 2017, the EP Love Hotel and the two Singles Popo and Ok Cool were released. In June of the same year, Yung Hurn announced via Twitter that he no longer wanted to do rap after 2017. In December 2017, at the same time as releasing the single "GGGut", he announced that he wanted to release a first album with the title 1220 in spring 2018, which was officially released on 4 May 2018 and DJ Stickle.

With the release of the single "Cabrio", shortly before his appearance at the Donauinselfest 2019, he announced a new album Y for the same year. He also announced in an interview with the radio station FM4 that he was working on an album with the Love Hotel Band.

== Style and influence ==
Yung Hurn's early music was soon assigned by journalists to the cloud rap that was started in the United States at the end of the 2000s. In fact, in his first tracks, according to his own statements, he was inspired not only by the horrorcore representatives and hip hop pioneers Three 6 Mafia, but also by the Californian rapper Lil B, who is often referred to as the founder of cloud rap. In a show of the music magazine Tracks by the TV station Arte about him and the Cologne cloud rapper LGoony, Yung Hurn also said regarding his musical influences that he listens to indie as well as "deep dirty techno" and psychedelic rock. Thus, Tame Impala or Falco, but especially the Beatles, had strongly influenced him. He can also be seen on the show with a record by Jimi Hendrix.

Yung Hurn took a path away from pure hip-hop with the Love Hotel-EP, which had been produced by DJ Stickle and announced in the context of the video premiere of the associated R&B track Rot. On Valentine's Day the second track Diamant was released, a retro pop song atypical for Yung Hurn without any rap interludes. The video in the style of the 1980s shows the song interpreted by the Love Hotel Band, which includes Yung Hurn and the Berlin actor Lars Eidinger. The band now also performs live.
