= Süßenbrunn =

Part of Donaustadt, Vienna, Austria

Coordinates: 48°16′39″N 16°29′44″E

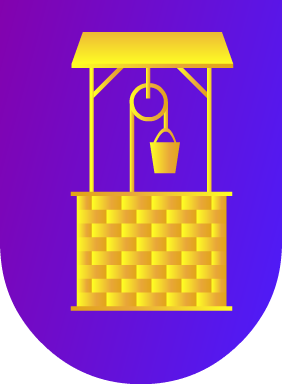
Coat of arms

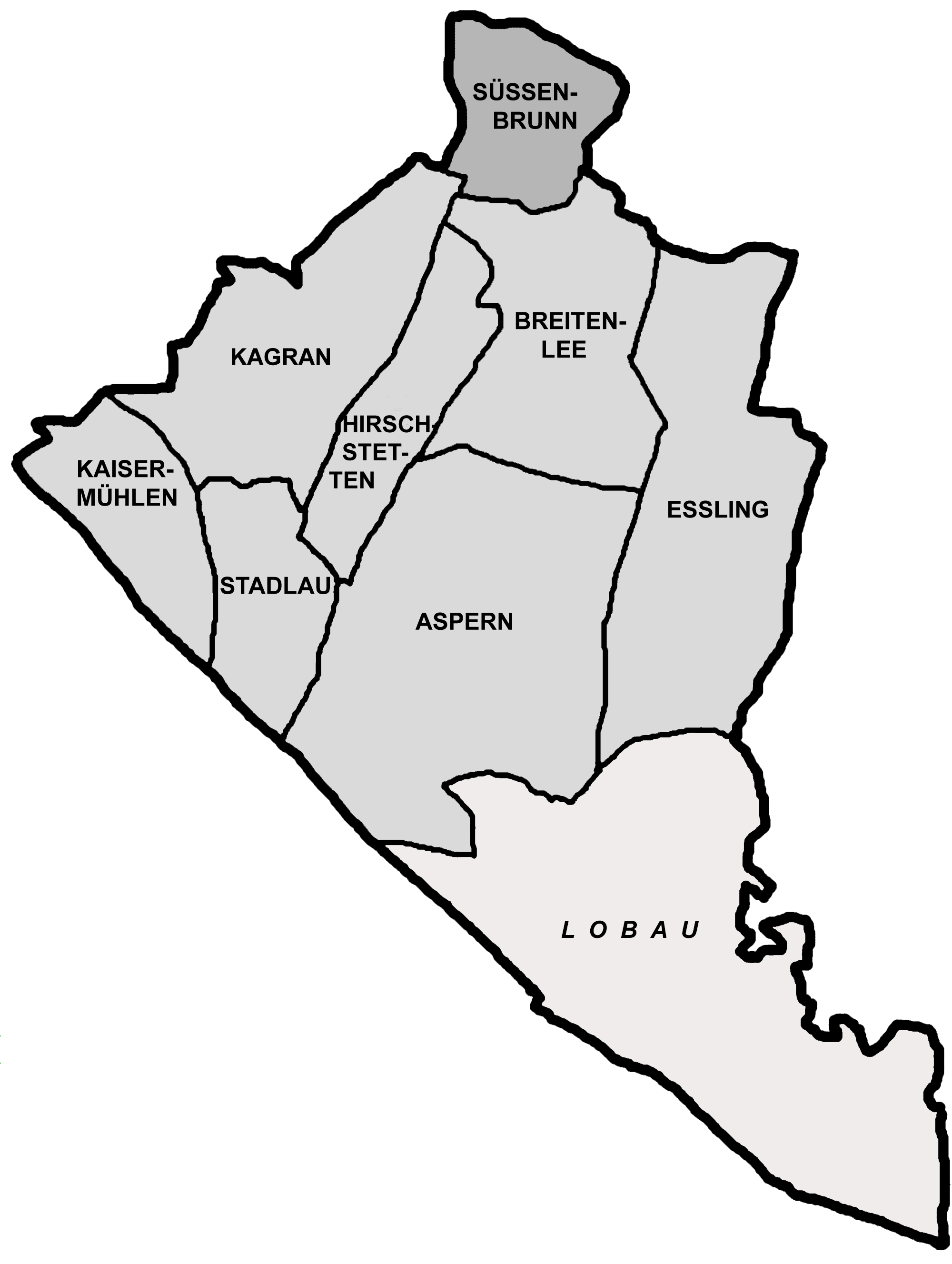
Location within Donaustadt

Süßenbrunn is a neighbourhood in Vienna, Austria, within Donaustadt, the 22nd district of Vienna. It has a population of 2,321 and covers 5.01 km^{2}.

== History ==
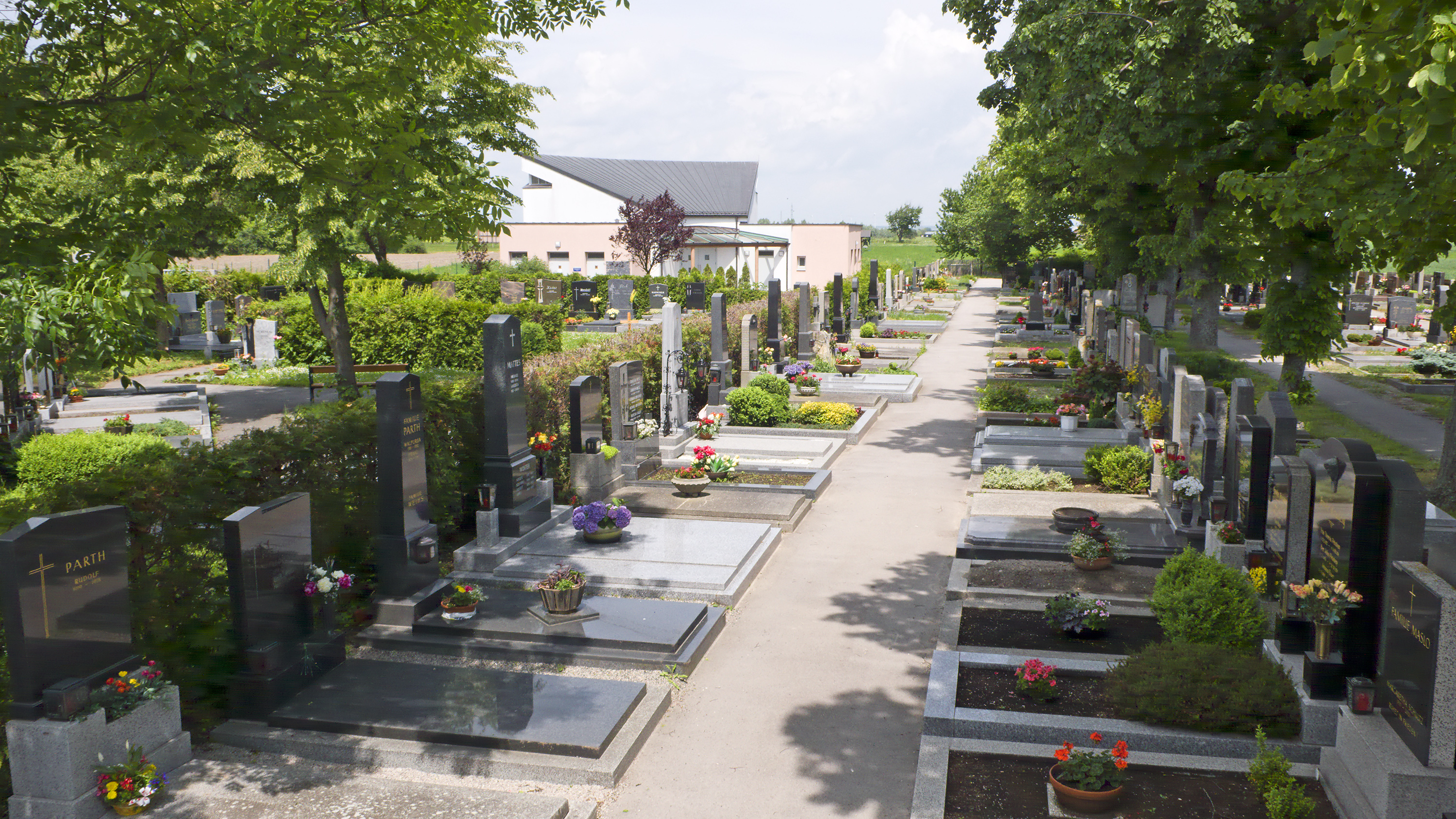
Süßenbrunn cemetery

In 1620, Süßenbrunn, which was built as an Angerdorf (a village with a central green space), was recorded as a noble residence. However, it suffered severe destruction during the Turkish sieges of 1529 and 1683. In 1713, a moated castle was built in Süßenbrunn. On the site of the former village green, a small church was built in 1837, which was later replaced in 1980. The church tower cross and the clock of the former church are now housed in the Donaustadt district museum. The small Süßenbrunn cemetery was consecrated in 1893.

In 1938, the village was incorporated into the new 22nd district, then named Groß-Enzersdorf, which became part of the expanded Greater Vienna. From 1942 to 1945, the town was home to a Nazi forced labour camp. Since 1954, it has been part of the smaller 22nd district, now called Donaustadt, along with seven other municipalities.

== Geography ==
Süßenbrunn borders two other parts of Donaustadt: Kagran and Breitenlee. Covering an area of 5.01 km^{2}, it is the second smallest part of Donaustadt, just ahead of Stadlau.

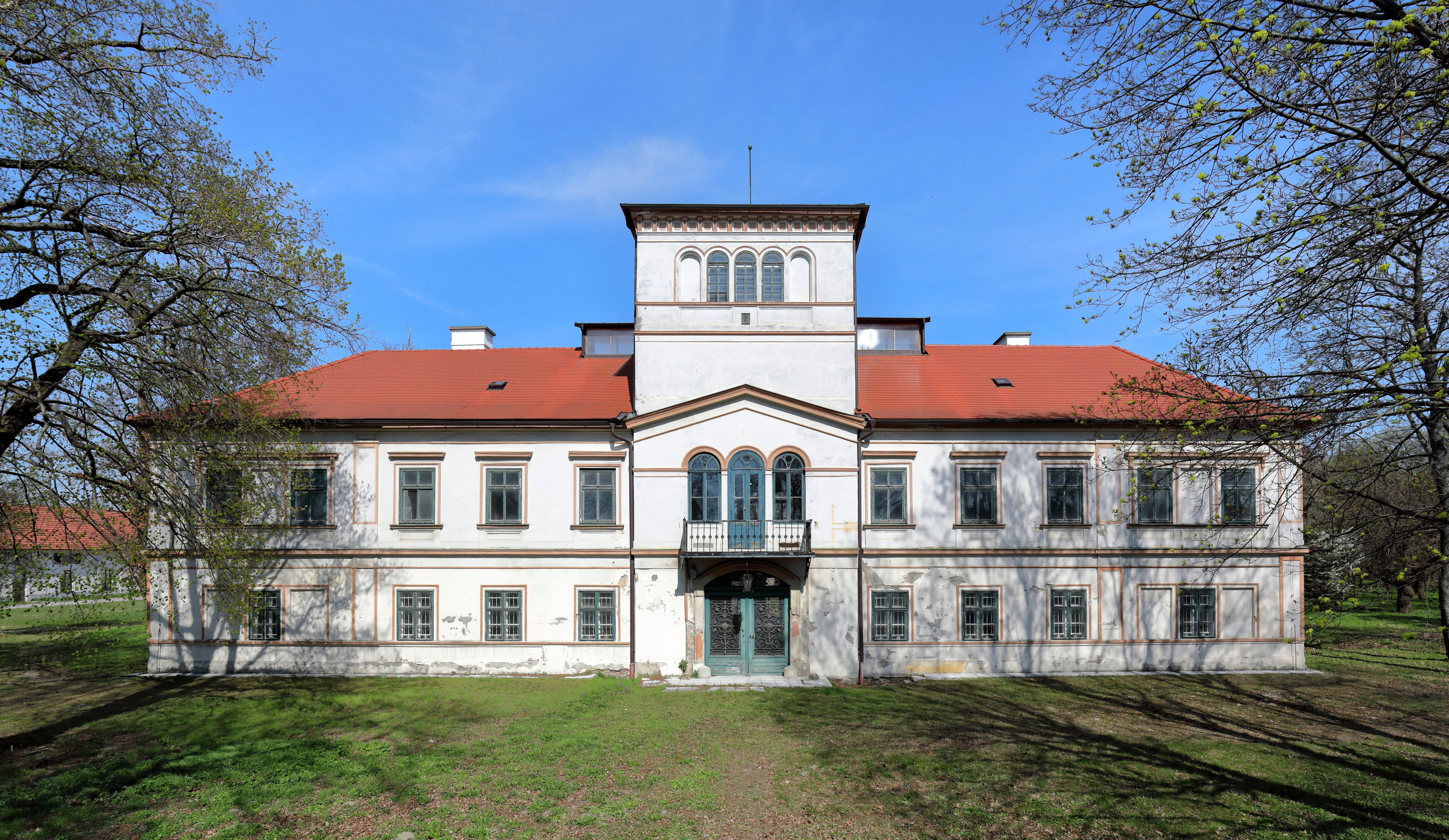
Süßenbrunn Castle

== Features ==
The Renaissance Süßenbrunn Castle was built in the 16th century and redesigned in a Romantic style in the 19th century. It was used as the seat of an agricultural estate. In 2010, the Vienna-based shoe manufacturer Ludwig Reiter restored the castle, which has served as the company's headquarters since 2011.

Süßenbrunn is home to one of Vienna's two volunteer fire departments, along with the one in neighboring Breitenlee.

The Badeteich Süßenbrunn is a privately owned lake open to the public, featuring a sunbathing lawn, children's beach, and playground.

The area also features an equestrian club, the football club SC Süßenbrunn, a golf course built around 2000, and a shooting range opened in 1968.
