= Donaustadt =

Coordinates: 48°13′05″N 16°28′59″E

Donaustadt Donaustod (Bavarian)
- 22nd District of Vienna

- Coat of arms

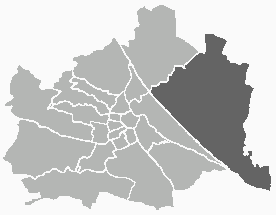
- Location of the district within Vienna
- Country: Austria
- City: Vienna

Government
  - District Director: Ernst Nevrivy (SPÖ)
  - First Deputy: Karl Gasta (SPÖ)
  - Second Deputy: Gerda Müller (ÖVP)
  - Representation (60 Members): SPÖ 23, FPÖ 17, Greens 8, ÖVP 5, NEOS 5, KPÖ 1, HC 1

Area
  - Total: 102.30 km^{2} (39.50 sq mi)

Population (2025-01-01)
  - Total: 228,158
  - Density: 2,230.3/km^{2} (5,776.4/sq mi)
- Postal code: 1220
- Address of District Office: Schrödingerplatz 1; 1220 Wien
- Website: www.wien.gv.at/donaustadt/

Donaustadt (German pronunciation: [ˈdoːnaʊˌʃtat]; "Danube City") is the 22nd district of Vienna, Austria (German: 22. Bezirk, Donaustadt). Donaustadt is the easternmost district of Vienna.

== Geography ==
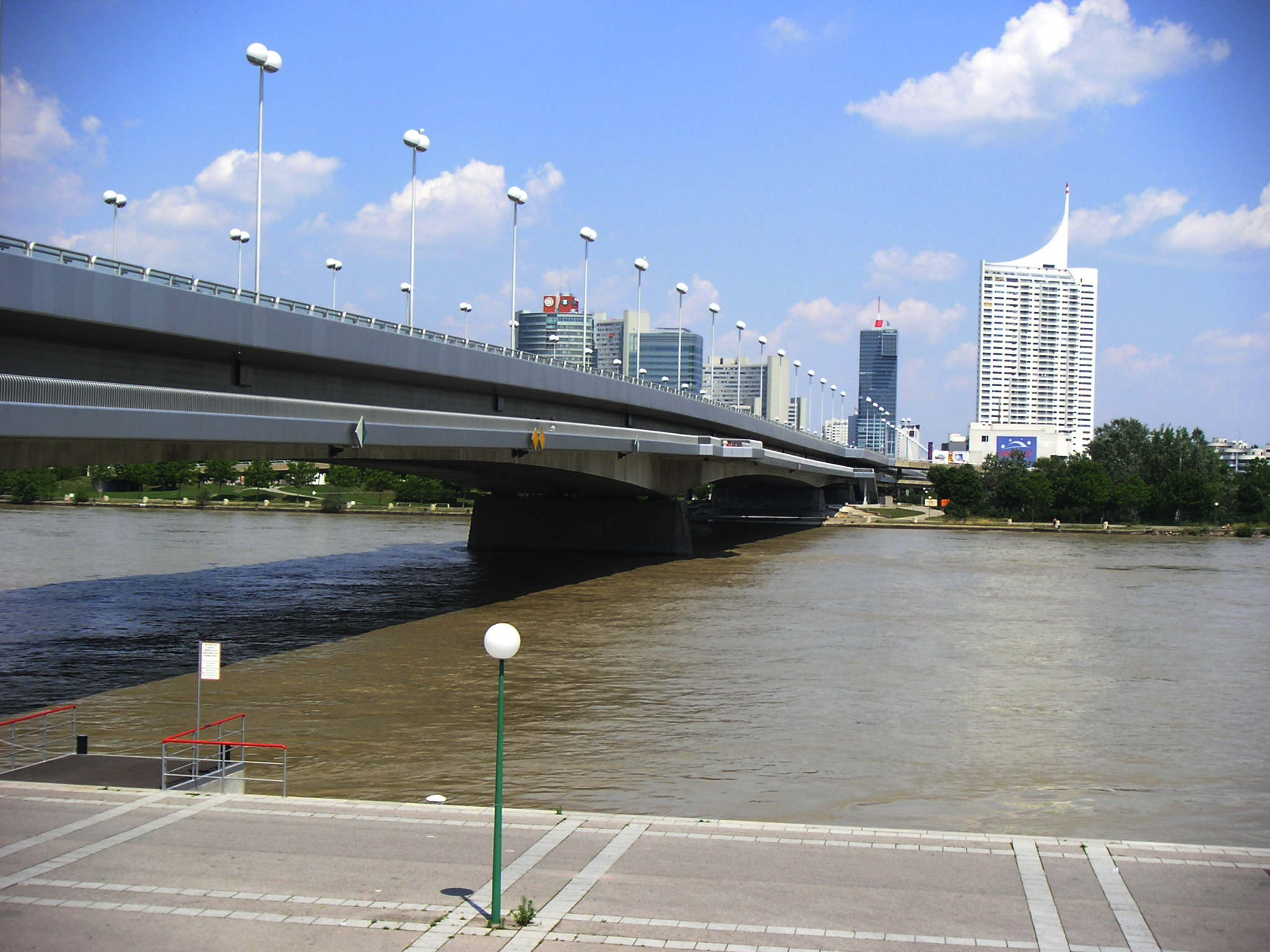
Reichsbrücke (Empire Bridge), the main bridge connecting from Leopoldstadt and central Vienna into Donaustadt (across the Danube), with view of the Kaisermühlen skyline

The Donaustadt district is situated in the northeast part of Vienna and is the largest of the districts by area, occupying about one-quarter of the Vienna city area, 102.24 square kilometres (39.48 sq mi).

It borders the 2nd District (Leopoldstadt), the 11th District (Simmering), and the 21st District (Floridsdorf), as well as parts of Lower Austria.

The district has a large part to the west of the Danube, Danube Island and Old Danube. In the east and north, Donaustadt shares the Marchfeld. Overall, about 59 percent of the district's territory is in green areas, making 30 percent of Vienna's green space lie in the 22nd District.

By Danube regulation, in 1870-75, the territory of the present district was radically changed. The Danube had originally spread out in numerous arms, so she was now forced in a wide bed. As the flood threat has not been fully defused, during 1972 to 1987, a side channel (as the "New Danube") was built parallel to the river, creating the long, thin Donauinsel (Danube Island) between the Danube and the New Danube.

The former Danube flood plain is now controlled in the 4 branches, or fingers, of the river, as they separate and then rejoin, all within Vienna, along the southwest edge of Donaustadt. The 4 branches are (from west to east): the Danube Canal (German: Donaukanal), the main Danube, the New Danube (Neue Donau), and the Old Danube (Alte Donau).

=== District parts ===
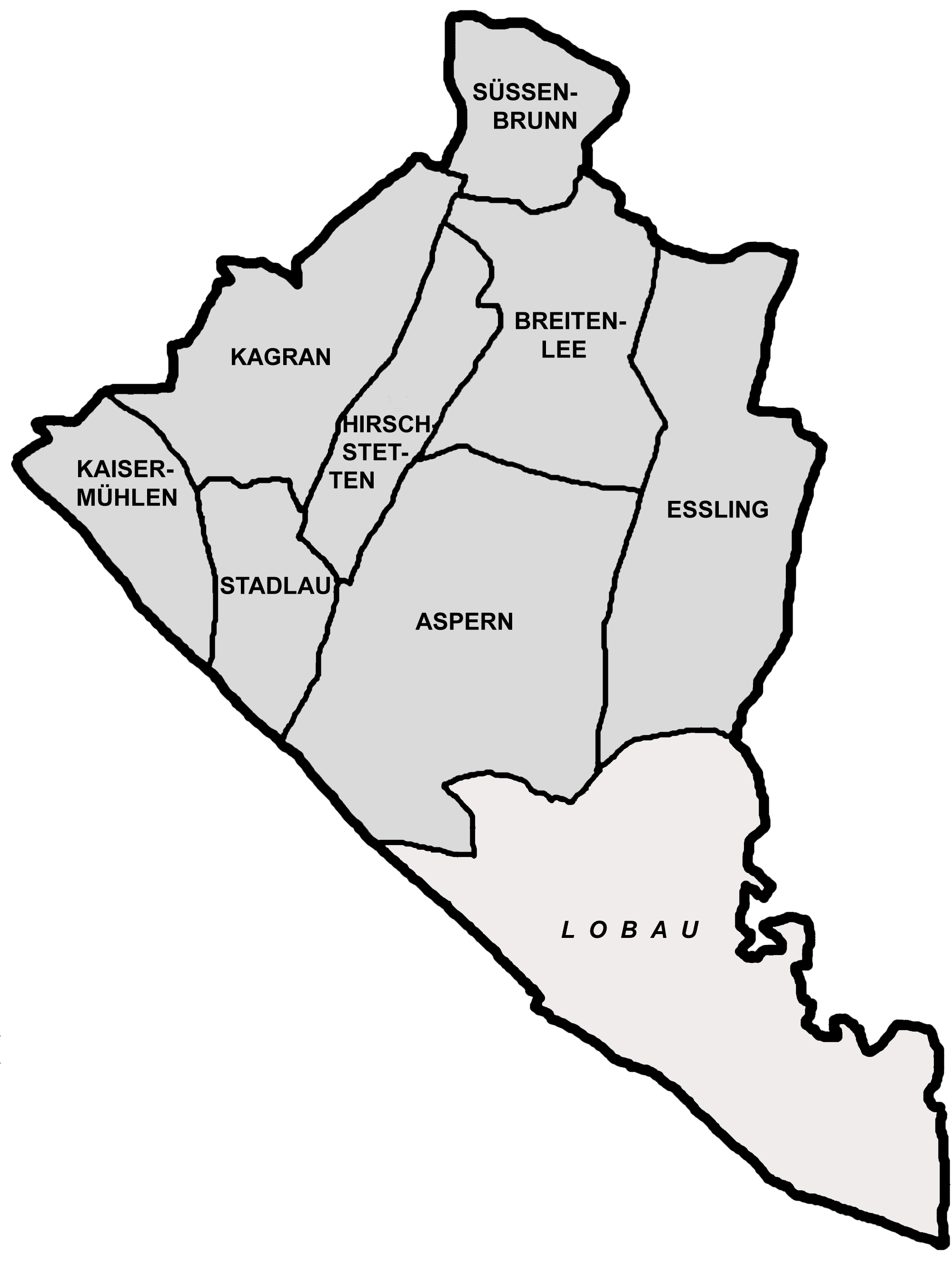
Map of district parts, with Lobau in the south

The district is made up of eight territories (former villages), whose individual coats of arms make up the coat of arms for the whole district. In the current scheme, the district is divided into those official sub-sections (German: Bezirksteile).

The eight district parts are:

- Aspern
- Breitenlee
- Hirschstetten
- Essling
- Kagran
- Kaisermühlen
- Stadlau
- Süßenbrunn

In addition to these eight territories, Donaustadt also contains a ninth area, Donau City (officially part of Kaisermühlen), which is between the Alte Donau ("Old Danube") and Neue Donau ("New Danube"). It was constructed recently, consisting of many modern buildings and skyscrapers, of which most contain offices. In addition, another area of Donaustadt, Lobau, contains a large forest and meadow. Altogether, about 59% of the district is greenery, which is 30% of all the green spaces in all of Vienna. The area went through a dramatic change as a result of the 1870–1875 legislation Wiener Donauregulierung. Were the original Danube to branch out into its many arms, it would take up a considerable area. In order to control the danger of the Danube flooding over, a side channel (as the "New Danube") was built parallel to the river, creating the Donauinsel between the Danube and the New.

=== Geology ===
The area of the Donaustadt District was primarily shaped by the river Danube, which, over time, formed terraces. Especially during the Ice Age, frost came through to form large debris dimensions, by the Danube in the Vienna Basin. In the warm phase, in the section following the Danube, gravel terraces formed out in the district area, dividing the near Danube "zone of recent meander" and the higher-lying Prater Terrace. The slightly higher-lying terrace Prater comes from the Würmeiszeit (the most recent ice-age); the underlying terrace was created after the Ice Age. For older terraces, the intensive weathering is characteristic, with a layer of loess or clay. On the surface, DonauStadt has five to three feet (1.52 to 0.91 m) of gravel. This is composed of sandy Central and Grobkiesen together, which through the Danube have been deposited. The plattigen stones are usually sandstone from the nearby Vienna. The round Gerölle consist mostly of crystalline rocks such as granite, gneiss, crystal, etc. The granite comes just as the black amphibolite from the Bohemian Massif. The greenish-gray gneiss was up from the Central Alps and the Czech mass removed. Further round to oval Kiese consist of limestone and comes from the Northern Limestone Alps. Below the gravel, saturated with groundwater, are sands of the Pannon iums, which were deposited here over 9.7 to 8 million years ago. In several kilometers deep (a few miles), the foothills of the Northern Limestone Alps include shifts from the Mesozoic, which have gas and oil about three kilometers deep (2 miles).

=== Land use ===
The developed area of Donaustadt covers 25.0% (Vienna citywide: 33.32%) of the district area, but this is the second-lowest value of a municipality in Vienna. The developed area itself is distributed as 57.4% to 28.4% as residential versus other. Donaustadt thus has a very high proportion of residences. The proportion of land to the cultural, religious, sporting or public sector are dedicated, coincides with 6.0% share. Greenspaces in Donaustadt took a total share of 58.4%. Nearly 51.9% of that green space is accounted for by agricultural land, a value only Favoriten and Floridsdorf exceeded. The bulk of the remaining green areas account for 25.71% as forests (in Lobau) or 13.45% in meadows. With a share of 8.60% of the district area, surface waters take a very high priority in use. Here the waters of the Danube and its Bayou are crucial. The proportion of trafficked area at the district is 8.02%, with the second-lowest value in Vienna.

Space allocation in 2001
Builtspace			Greenspace						Water	Transport areas
2,556.29			5,968.42						879.17	819.98
Residences	Oper- ations	Public Facilities	Farms	Parks	Forests	Meadows	Small gardens	Rec. areas		
1,466.46	724.69	153.36	3095.7	100.24	1,534.2	256.41	802.61	179.2		

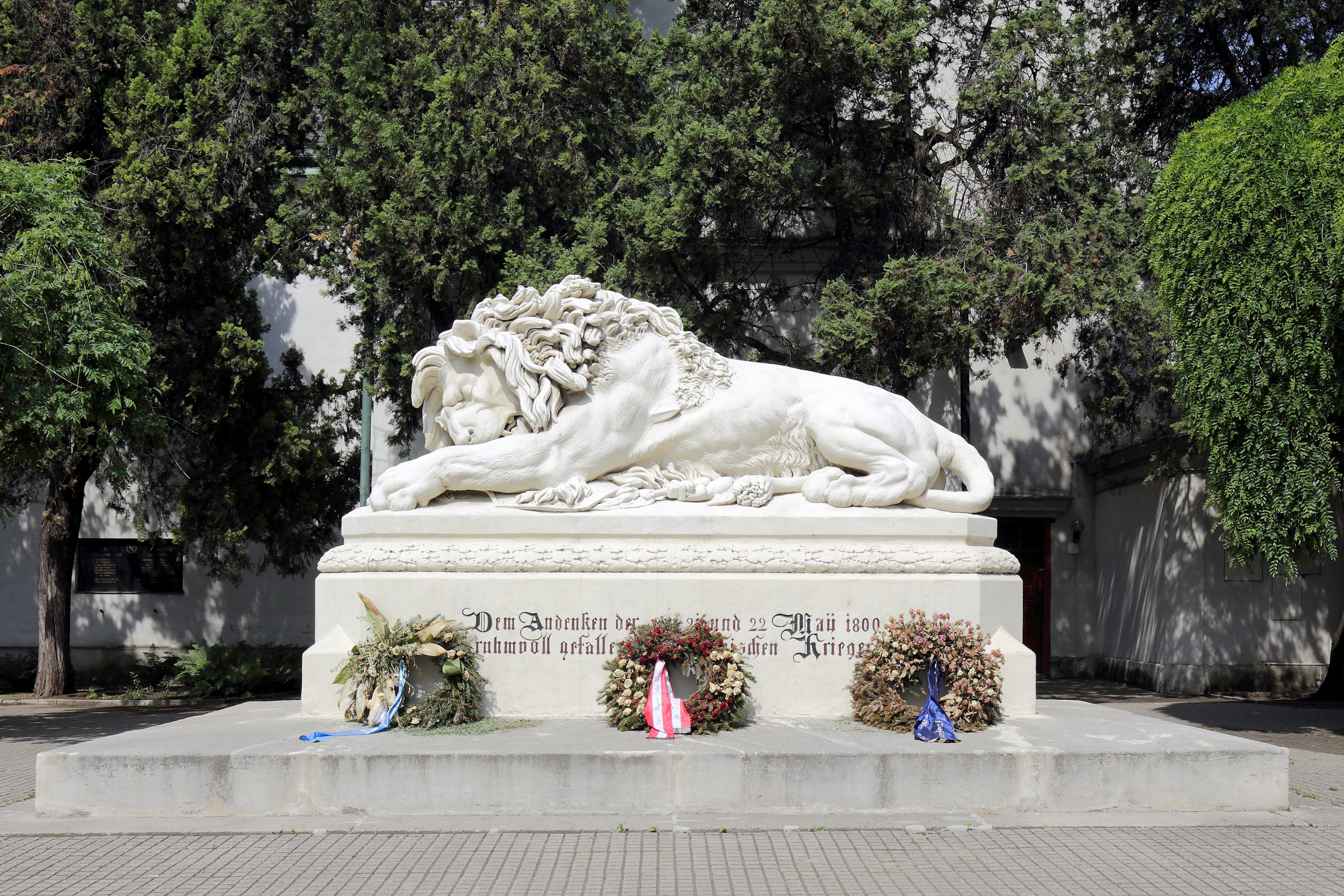
The "Asperner Lion" (Asperner Löwe) in memory of the battle of Aspern-Essling in 1809

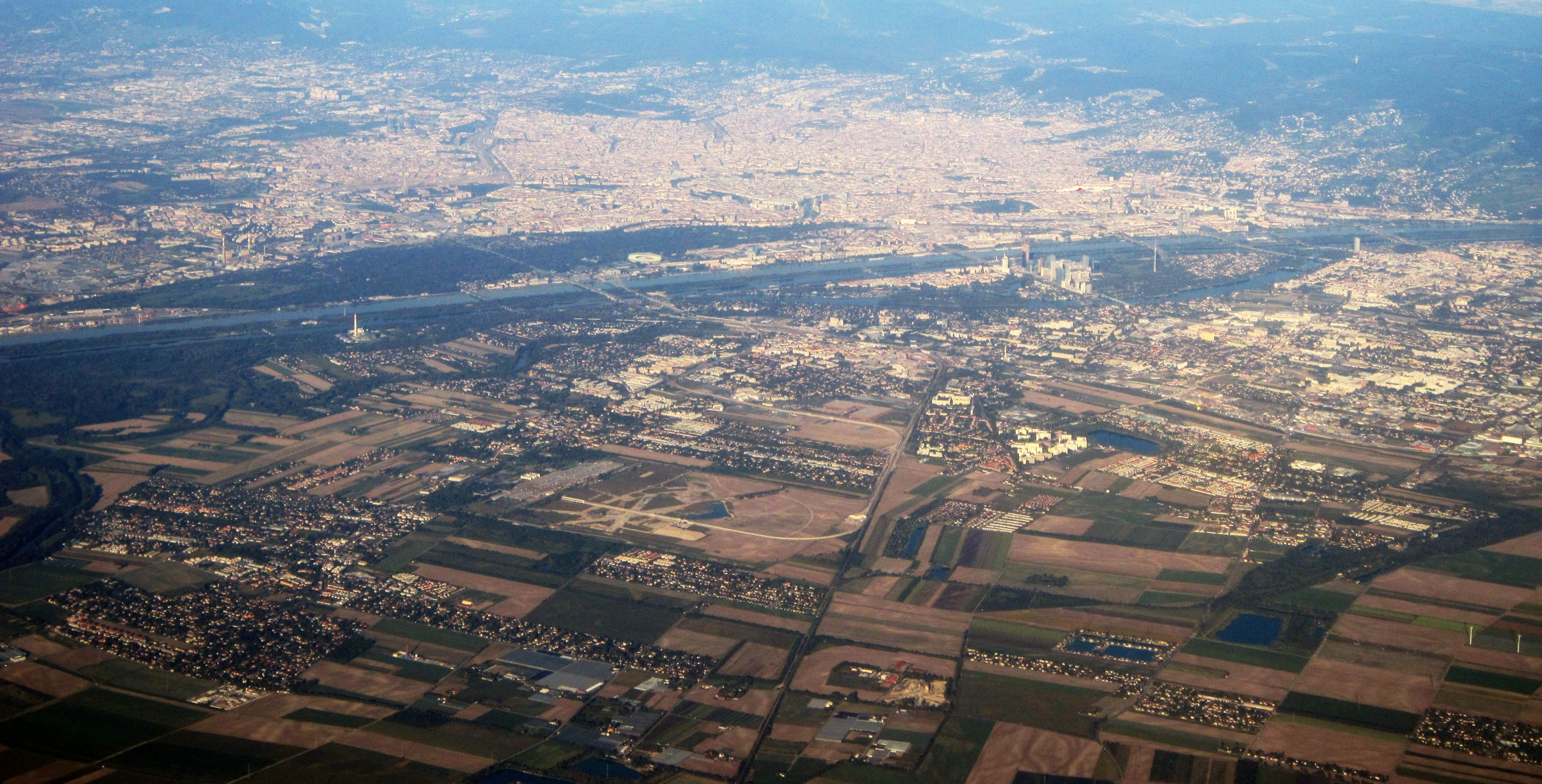
Aerial view of Donaustadt, with former Aspern Airfield in the center

== History ==
The former villages of Aspern and Essling are known as the place where Archduke Charles of Austria defeated Napoleon Bonaparte's French army in 1809, at the Battle of Aspern-Essling. On essentially the same ground, Napoleon defeated the Austrian army two months later in the Battle of Wagram, which ended the war in a French victory.

The relatively young district (compared to the others, at least) was formed by a resolution of the Vienna Landtag on June 29, 1946. The resolution was supposed to restore the borders between Vienna and Lower Austria. However, due to the Allied occupation of Austria following the Second World War, the resolution could not immediately take effect. In 1954, the Soviet occupying authorities accepted the re-districting proposal, and the resolution took effect on July 2, 1954.

== Population ==
Historical population
Year	Pop.	±%
1869	3,608	—
1880	6,281	+74.1%
1890	8,724	+38.9%
1900	15,602	+78.8%
1910	26,833	+72.0%
1923	33,717	+25.7%
1934	41,194	+22.2%
1939	56,805	+37.9%
1951	53,098	−6.5%
1961	57,137	+7.6%
1971	80,200	+40.4%
1981	99,801	+24.4%
1991	106,589	+6.8%
2001	136,443	+28.0%
2011	161,419	+18.3%
2021	202,569	+25.5%
Source: Censuses

The district area, of Donaustadt, had the largest population growth of all districts in Vienna. Due to the large size of today's district area and the history of horticultural or agricultural, large areas for a progressive urbanization are available. The protection of the forested Lobau section, a large share of the district land area, has limited the level of urbanization at the same time. Even before incorporation, the autonomous communities still had very high growth rates. Between 1869 and the year 1910, the population had already increased 8-fold. Up to 1939 the strong growth had continued, doubling again. After a stagnation in the 1940s and 1950s, high growth recommenced in the 1960s, which until now, is among the highest of all municipal districts. Donaustadt reached a high growth rate, in 2006, with a population of 148,980 people, making it the district with the second largest population. Nevertheless, the district is still relatively sparsely populated. With 1,420 inhabitants per square kilometer (2005), only the district Hietzing was more sparsely populated.

=== Population structure ===
In Donaustadt, the population in 2005 was younger on average than in Vienna as a whole. 18.0% of the district's population were children under 15 years, the highest value in Vienna (citywide 14.6%). The proportion of the population from 15 to 59 years at 62.9% was similar to the citywide average (63.4%), while the proportion of people aged 60 years or more was among the lowest of the Vienna districts at 19.1% (Vienna: 22.0%). The gender distribution in the district area in 2001 was 47.8% men and 52.2% women, the number of married people stood at 43.9% compared to 41.2%, above the average of Vienna.

=== Origin and language ===
The proportion of foreign district residents in 2005 was 9.7% (Vienna citywide: 18.7%). This was the second lowest value of a district of Vienna. As in the entire state, the proportion of foreigners, however, a growth in the 2001 figure, was at 7.4%. The highest proportion of foreigners in 2005 represented approximately 1.6% share of the district population as nationals from Serbia and Montenegro. Another 0.8% were Turkish, 0.8% Polish and 0.6% German citizens. In 2001, a total of 15.9% of the minority population was born in Austria. About 2.3% expressed as a language Serbian, 1.9% Turkish, and 1.1% Croatian.

=== Religious denominations ===
Donaustadt, due to a very small proportion of foreigners, has one of the highest populations of people of Roman Catholic faith, at 54.7%, in Vienna (citywide 49.2%). There are 13 municipal districts in Roman Catholic parishes, from the City Deanery 22 form. In contrast, the proportion of people with Islamic faith is 4.3%, and the Orthodox Church has 2.8%, below the average (Vienna citywide: 7.8% or 6%). The proportion of Protestant residents stood at 4.5% in the overall context of Vienna. Nearly 28.7% of the district population in 2001 were not included in a religious community, but this is the second highest value of a municipality of Vienna. Further 5.1% of the population had no religion or other given.

== Politics ==
District Directors from 1945
Mathias Böhm (KPÖ)	1945–1946
Leopold Horacek (SPÖ)	1946–1959
Rudolf Köppl (SPÖ)	1959–1977
Rudolf Huber (SPÖ)	1977–1981
Albert Schultz (SPÖ)	1981–1993
Leopold Wedel (SPÖ)	1993–1997
Franz–Karl Effenberg (SPÖ)	1998–2005
Renate Winklbauer (SPÖ)	2005–2006
Norbert Scheed (SPÖ)	2006–2014
Ernst Nevrivy (SPÖ)	2014–

The Soviet occupation installed Communist Mathias Böhm as the first district director. Social democrat Leopold Horacek was the next one. Because the status of the district was ambiguous until 1954, public votes for director were not used. Horacek was confirmed by the first vote of the people in 1954, and until 1991, the SPÖ held about 55% of the popular vote. In 1996, the FPÖ's increasing popularity caused the SPÖ to lose the majority for the first time, when they gathered only 43% of the popular vote. In 2001, they regained the majority, claiming 54.25% of the vote. The FPÖ received 19.83%, the ÖVP had 11.83%, the Greens got 9.44%, and the Liberal Forum had 2.69%. At the elections 2010 it all changed significantly : SPÖ 47.9%, FPÖ 30.2%, ÖVP 9.5%, the Greens 8.7% and the KPÖ 1.4% the new founded BZÖ 1.1%. The LIF reached 0.59%.

== Crest (coat of arms) ==
Crest of Donaustadt

The seal of Donaustadt is divided into eight panels, which represent parts of the district. In the upper left part of the crest, is the emblem of the talking Stadlau with a standing in the Au Stadel. The Stadel is on a greenfield site with trees and a blue background. The Stadel is locked with a thatched roof and two points which are red flags. At top-center is the emblem of Aspern, a solitary aspen tree. In the upper right part, a heraldic symbol of a golden well is for the district part Süßenbrunn. Referring to existing wells, it shows the fountain in front of a blue background on a gray stone floor below. The fountain is covered, and on a golden rope hangs a bucket. At left-center, the heraldic coat of arms of the Breitenlee displayed. It shows 2 red stripes split by a silver crossbar stripe with gold crosier holding a red paper bag. The figure is the heraldic crest of the Scottish Abbey (Schottenstift), now removed, operated as a farm in Breitenlee. In the center panel, Saint George is shown as the dragon slayer in golden armor, on a silver horse. The presentation represents the district part of Kagran and goes back to the patronage of the Kagraner parish. Law excludes the arms of Essling. It shows a sash decorated with a diamond pattern, on golden eagle wings, set on red/silver split field. The emblem is the emblem of the Lords of Eslarn removed. The bottom-left panel has a golden ship mill on a blue background for the district part Kaisermühlen along the Danube. It symbolizes the many ship mills, which once existed. At bottom-right, a jumping gold deer, on a green meadow, relates to district part Hirschstetten.

== Notable personalities ==
- Georg Raphael Donner
- Reinhard Divis
- Martin Graf
- Bill Grah
- Siegfried Joksch
- Helmut Lang
- Robert Mayr-Harting
- Thomas Prager
- Fatty George
- Josef Sara
- Robert Sara
- Rudi Stohl
- David Alaba
- Yung Hurn
- Natascha Kampusch

== Culture and sights ==
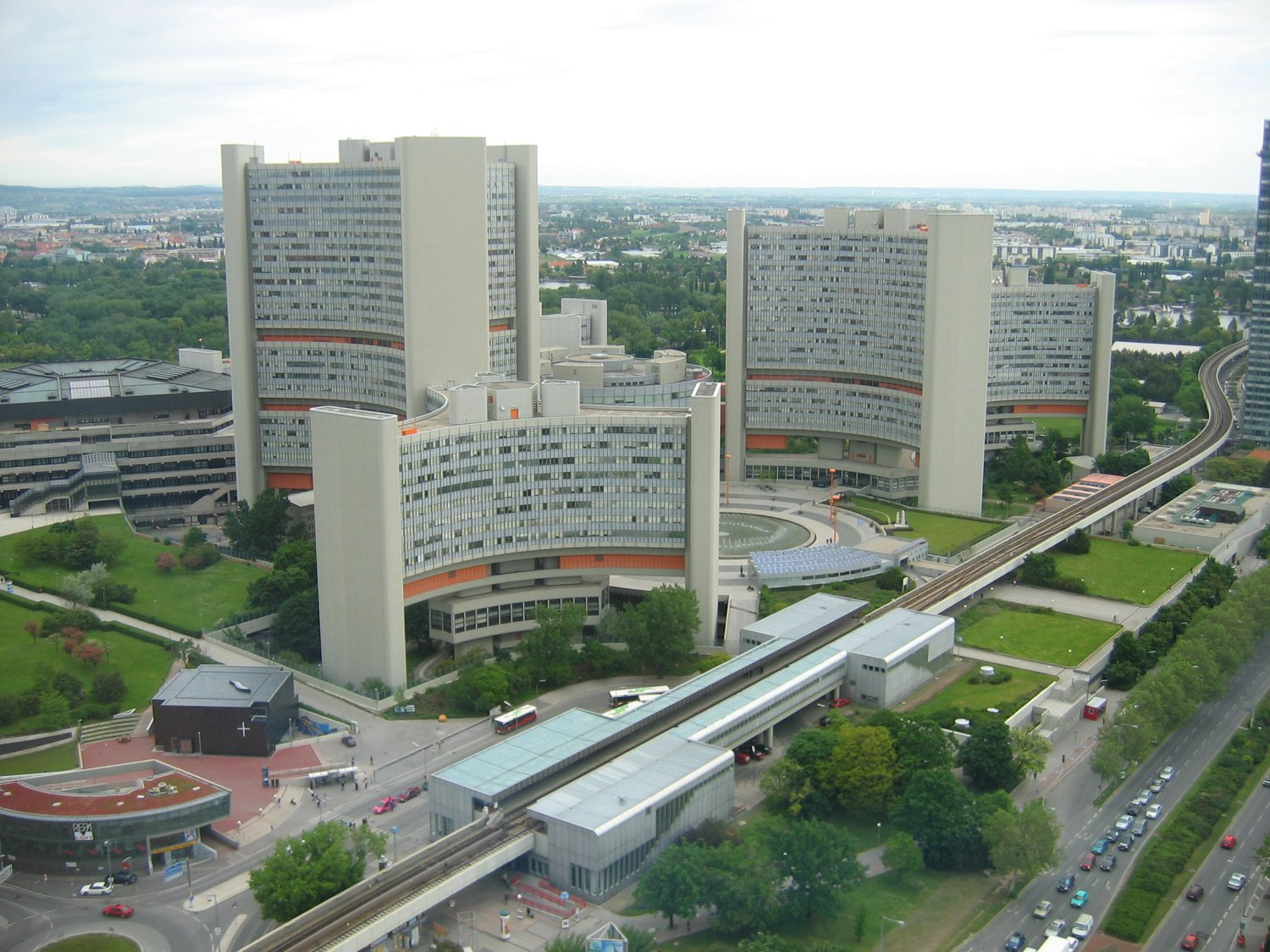
Vienna International Centre

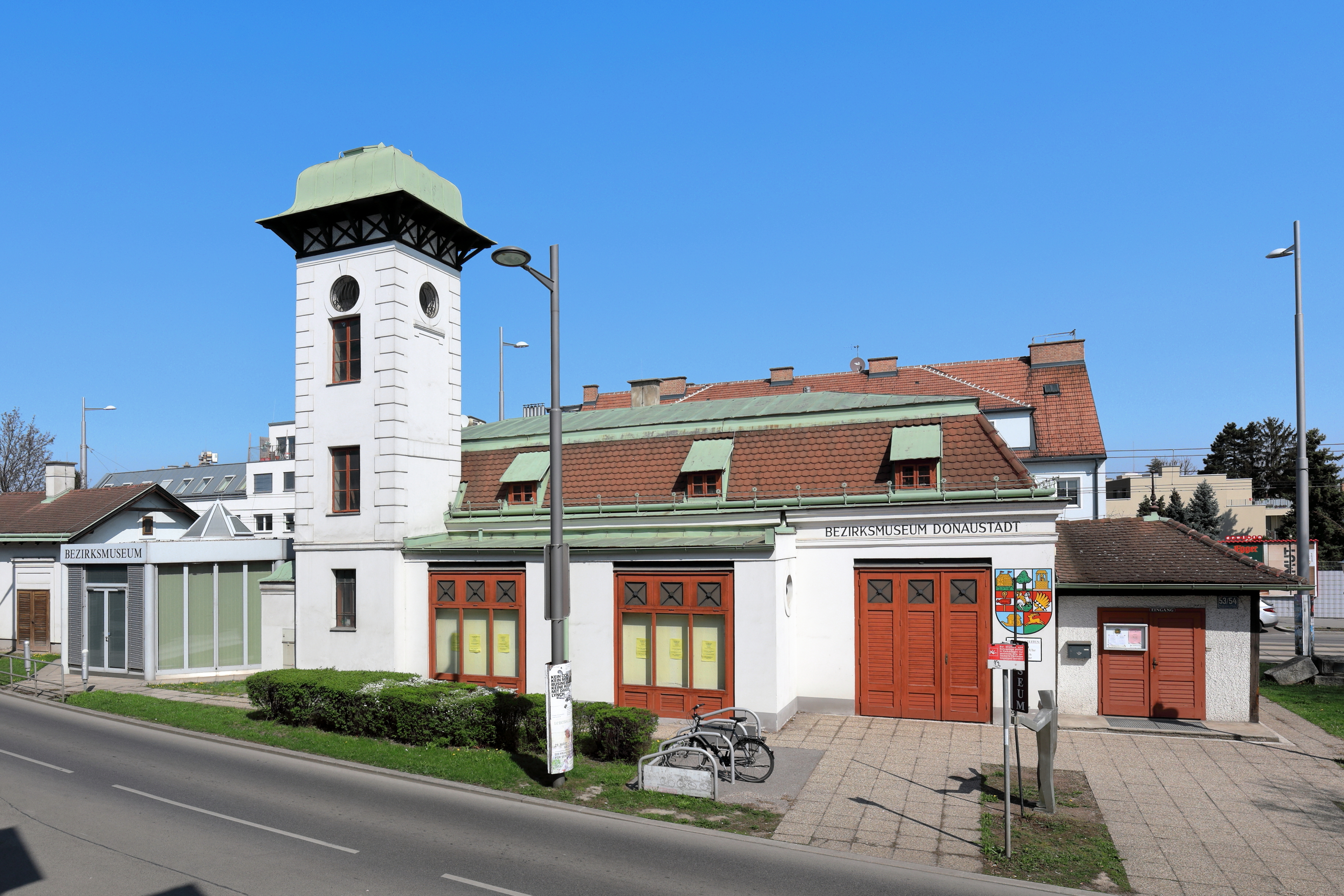
District Museum of Donaustadt

=== Sightseeing ===
- UNO-City (United Nations building in Vienna) and the Austria Center Vienna
- Danube Park and the Donauturm (Danube Tower)
- Donauzentrum: Vienna's largest shopping mall
- Donauinsel (Danube Island)
- Old Danube
- Danube-Auen National Park
- Blumengärten Hirschstetten: a flower garden in Hirschstetten
- Schüttkasten Essling in Essling
- Badeteich Hirschstetten: a lake in Hirschstetten

=== Area museums ===
The Donaustadt District Museum is located on the Kagraner square, and it houses a permanent exhibition of the history of the district parts. The Austrian Horticulture Museum (Österreichische Gartenbaumuseum) has been in Kagran since 1977, and it houses the largest collection of native Austrian horticulture and garden care. The collection was expanded in 2001 by collecting Sädtler (Austrian Museum flowers binding). The flower gardens Hirschstetten, with an office in Essling, Kultivationsbetriebe serve primarily as the city office. In addition, the site also includes plant and animal subjects: the gardens can be visited. The special museum Aspern-Essling 1809 dedicated to the museum as well as in bulk box Essling the Battle of Aspern. In 1972, Lobaumuseum was founded for information on the ecology of Lobau and the Danube-Auen and on the local flora and fauna. Moreover, the history of Lobau and the work of General Field Marshal Archduke Karl are represented.

== See also ==
- Wien-Aspern Airport - Flughafen Aspern
