= Essling =

Coordinates: 48.214°N 16.525°E

Essling (German pronunciation: [ˈɛslɪŋ]) is a neighbourhood in Vienna, Austria, within Donaustadt, the 22nd district of Vienna. It has a population of 21,625 and covers 14.98 km^{2}.

Coat of arms

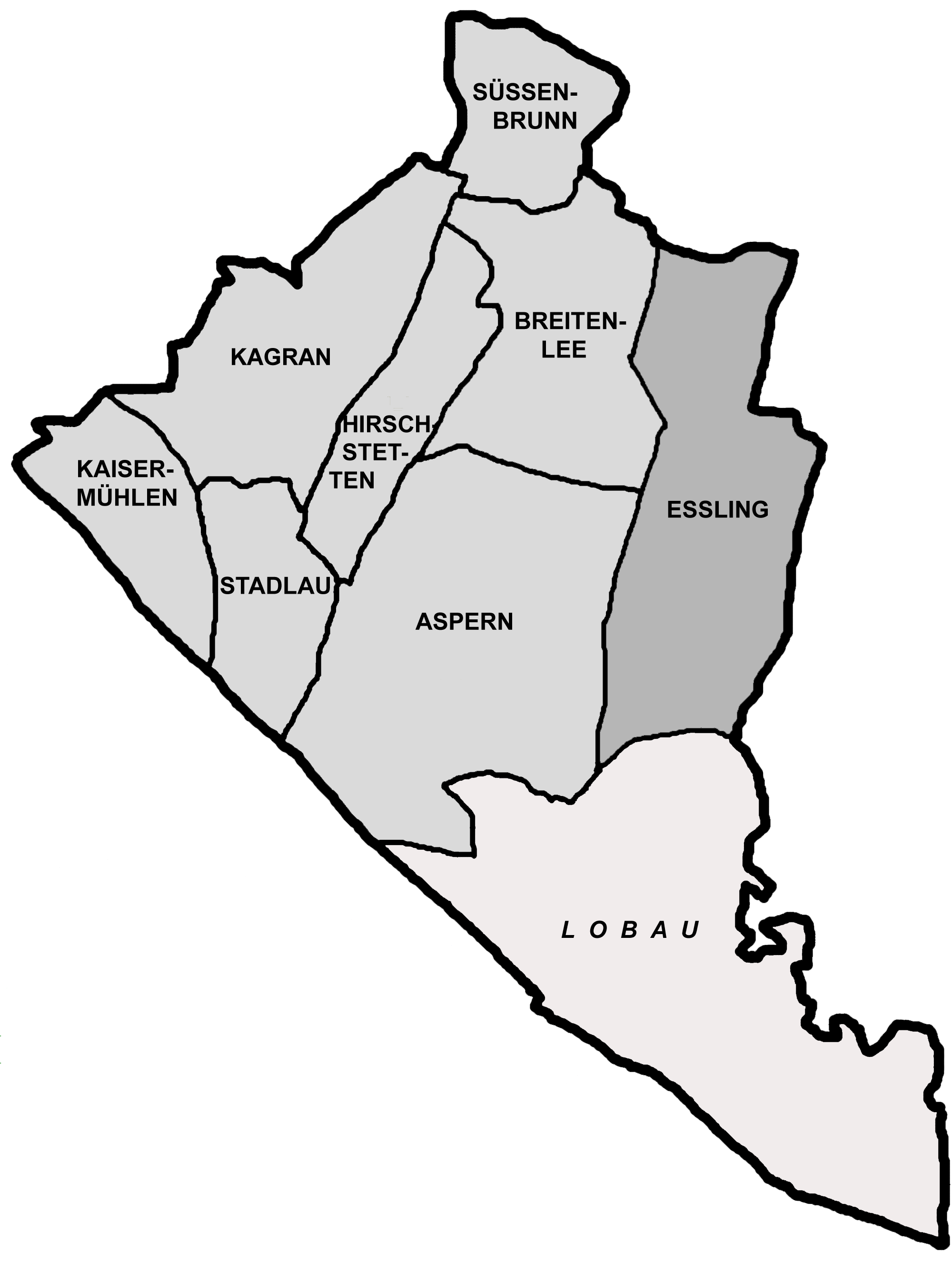
Location within Donaustadt

== History ==
The first known name of the town was Ezzelaren. The Eslarn family had important roles in the Vienna city administration. Konrad von Eslarn was mayor of Vienna in 1287. Since about 1590, the area has been known as Essling. The area is known for the Battle of Aspern-Essling during the War of the Fifth Coalition on 21-22 May 1809, which marked the first time Napoleon had been personally defeated in a major battle.

The Wien-Aspern Airport, which lay between Essling and Aspern, was Europe's biggest airport at time of opening. It closed in 1977 after the expansion of the Vienna International Airport.

== Location ==
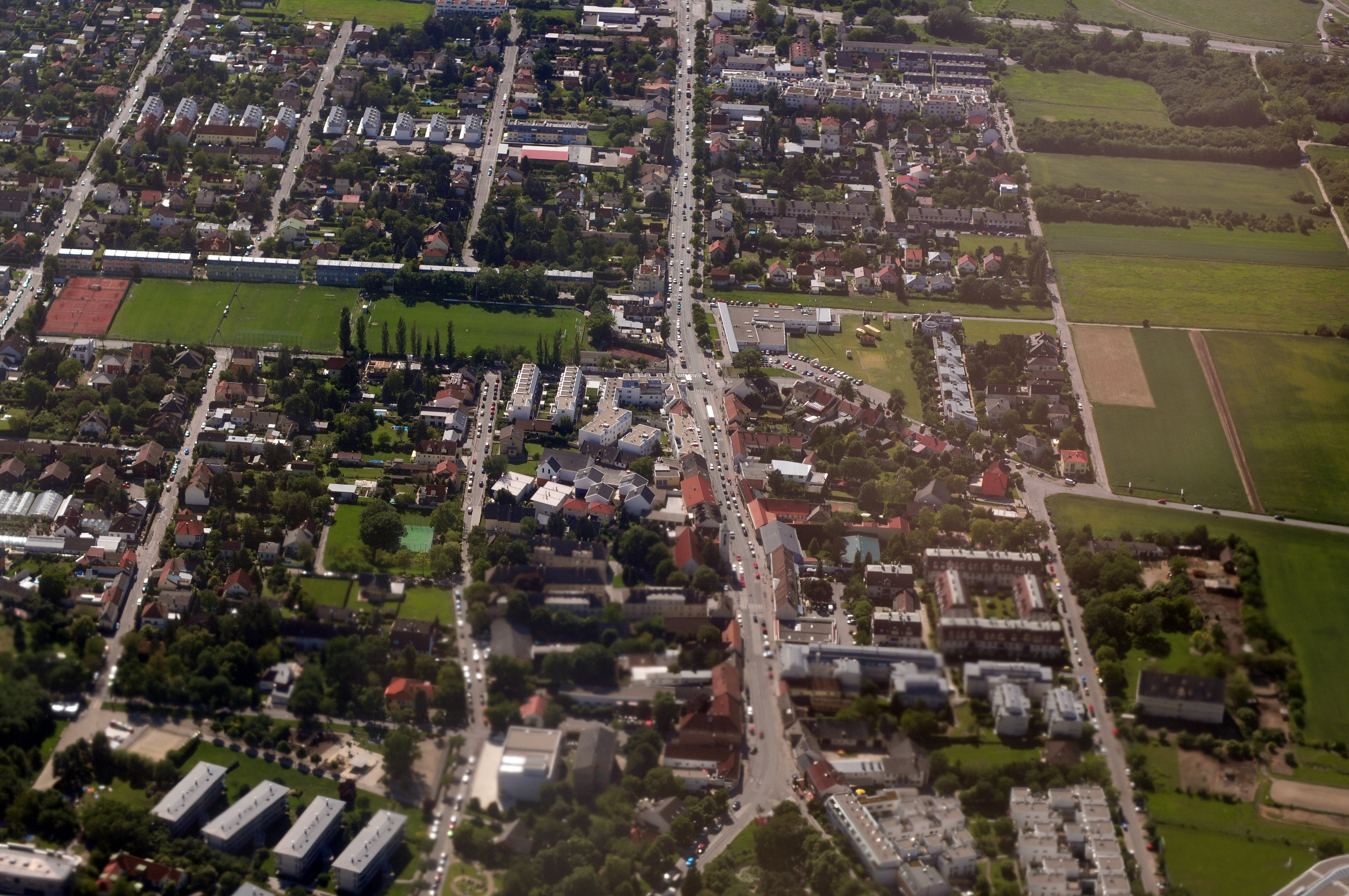
From above

Essling is located between the Lobau in the Danube-Auen National Park to the south, the Lower Austrian Marchfeld municipalities of Groß-Enzersdorf, Raasdorf, and Aderklaa to the east and north, and the Donaustadt district parts of Aspern and Breitenlee to the west. The cadastral municipality covers an area of 1,497.78 hectares. In addition to the old town center, Essling features several settlements amidst agricultural land, including Neuessling in the north. The Schafflerhof, located near the Marchegg Eastern railway line, was once the economic estate of the manorial lordship of Essling.

== Culture and sights ==
Architectural heritage

Some buildings in the town center along Essling's main street are designated by the City of Vienna as a protected architectural zone. These structures reflect the historical and cultural significance of the area.

Church

The Essling parish was consecrated just a few days after the Anschluss. During renovations, the interior was updated and clad in wood, with a Stations of the Cross and a wooden statue of the Holy Family becoming notable attractions.

Art

Essling is the birthplace of Georg Raphael Donner, a renowned sculptor born in 1693. Donner is celebrated as one of the most outstanding masters of sculptural art in the German-speaking world during the 18th century. His works can still be admired in prominent locations such as Vienna, Salzburg, Dresden, and Bratislava. A memorial plaque at the site of his birthplace commemorates his legacy.

Jazz

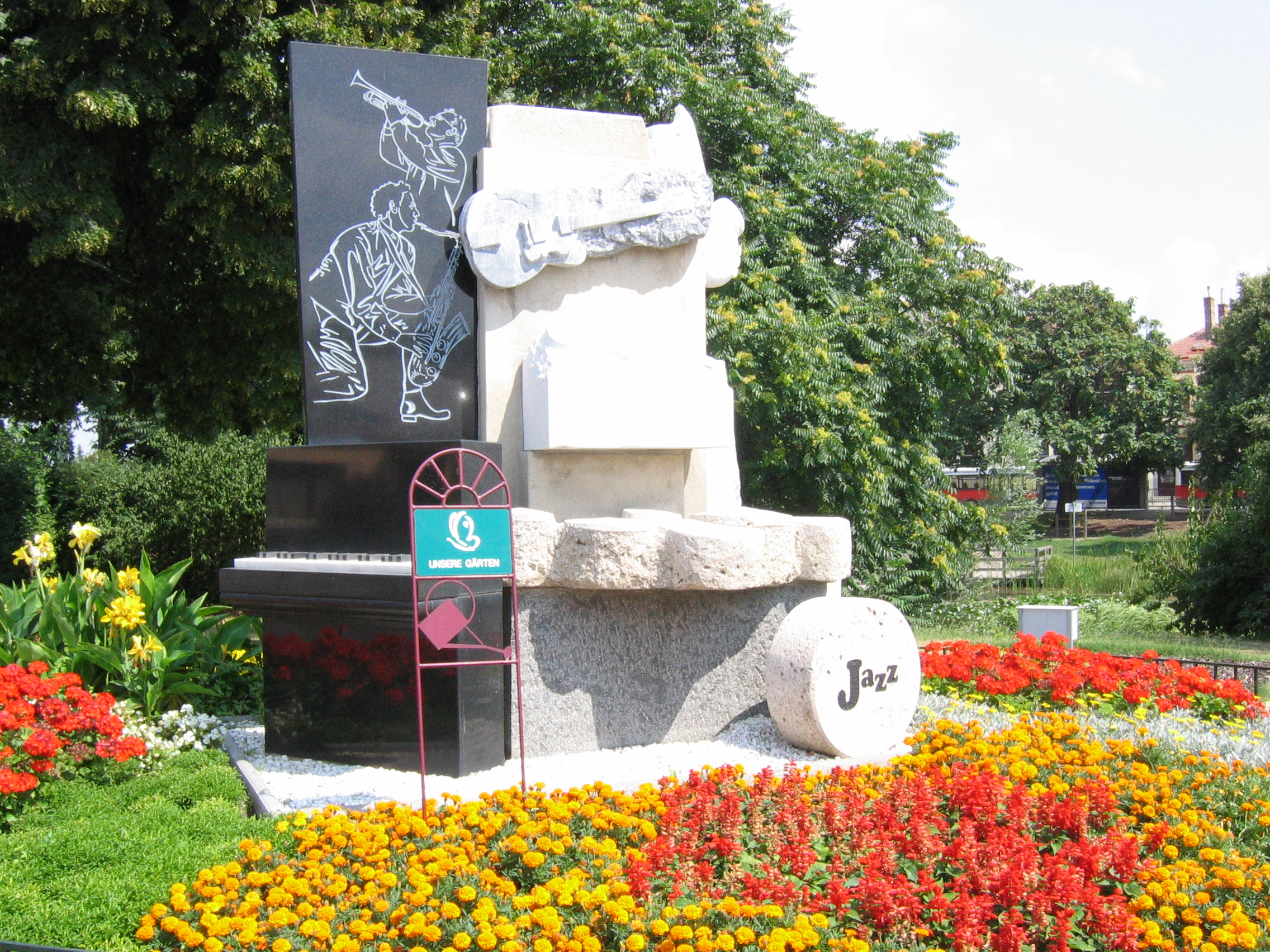
Memorial to Bill Grah

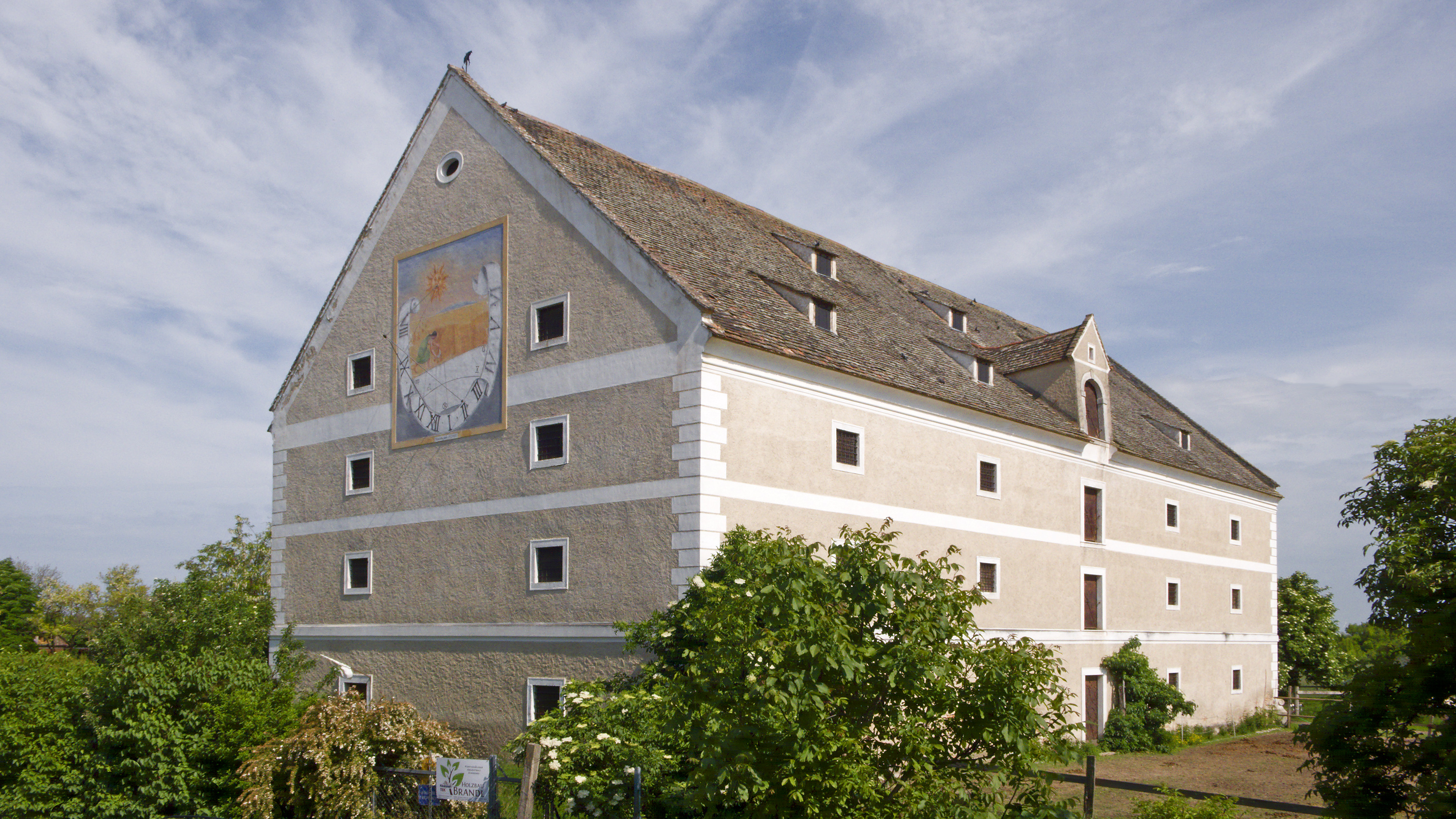
The old granary, now a museum

The town has a special connection to jazz, being the hometown of Franz Georg Pressler, better known by his stage name Fatty George, a jazz clarinettist. Another notable figure, Bill Grah, is honored with a park dedicated to him in front of the old elementary school. In 2005, the Jazz Museum was opened. During the summer, the park hosts regular jazz concerts, attracting music enthusiasts.

The Schüttkasten Originally a granary, the Schüttkasten, just off the main road, was a fiercely contested site during the battle against Napoleon. Today, it houses a model reenactment of the battle.

Sports

SV Essling, a football club, was founded in 1931 and currently plays in the 2. Landesliga, the fifth division of Austrian football.
