= Kagran =

Part of Donaustadt, Vienna, Austria

Coordinates: 48°14′55″N 16°26′54″E

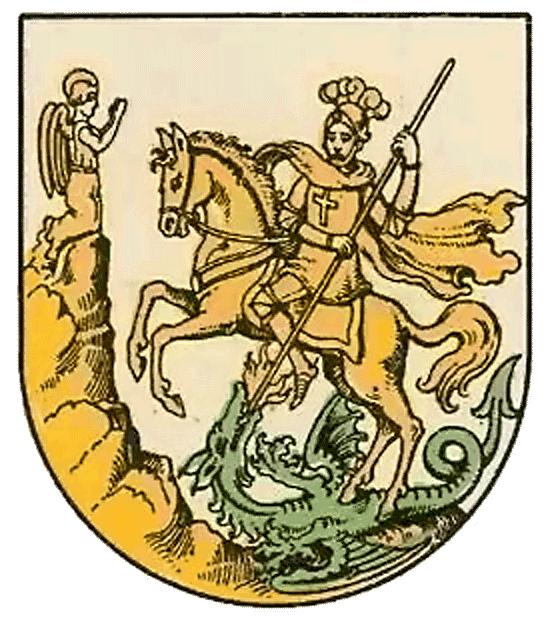
Coat of arms

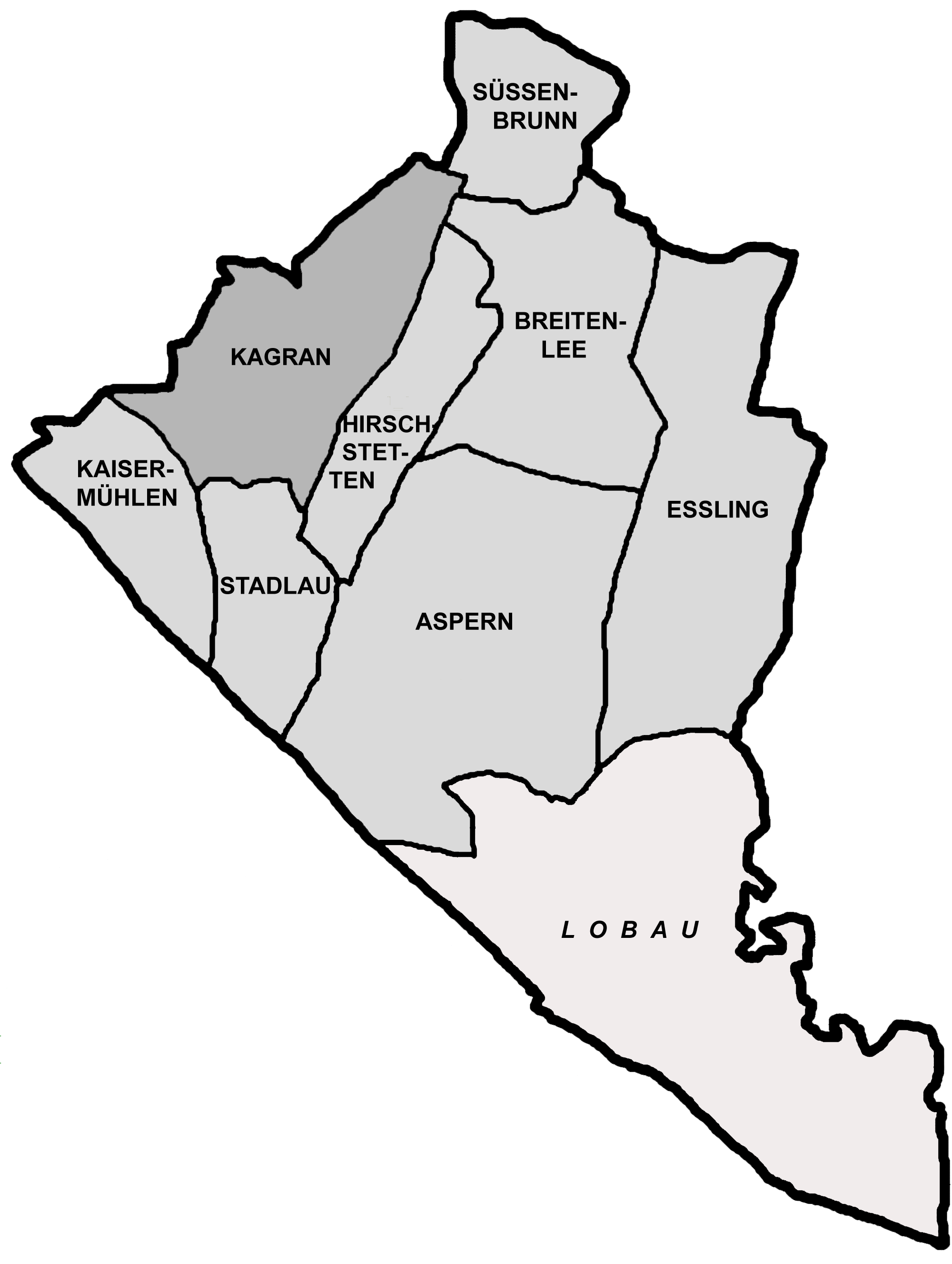
Location within Donaustadt

Kagran is a neighbourhood in Vienna, Austria, within Donaustadt, the 22nd district of Vienna. It has a population of 69,744 and covers 11.02 km².

== History ==
In 1904/05, Kagran, then an independent municipality, was incorporated into Vienna as part of the newly established 21st district, Floridsdorf. During the period of Red Vienna, many municipal buildings (Gemeindebauten) and urban settlements were constructed. Since 1954, Kagran, along with seven other towns, has been part of the 22nd district, Donaustadt. Kagran remained town-like until the 1970s, when large housing estates were built by the city to the north-east of the town centre.

== Geography ==
Kagran borders five other subdivisions of Donaustadt: Süßenbrunn, Breitenlee, Hirschstetten, Stadlau, and, across the Old Danube, Kaisermühlen. With an area of 11.02 km^{2}, it is the fourth largest part of Donaustadt. The town features a blend of single-family homes and apartment complexes.

== Features ==
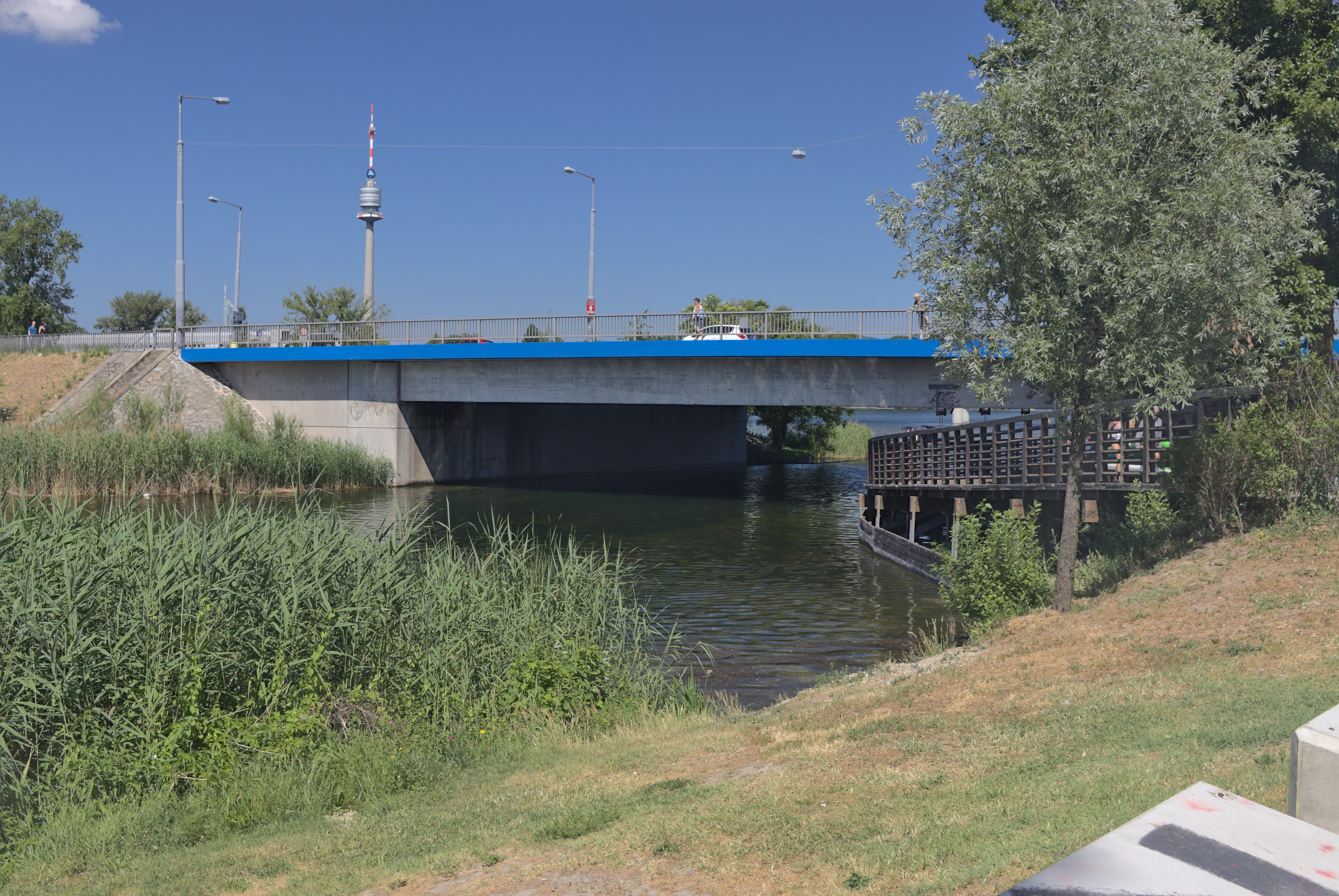
The Kagraner Brücke (Kagran Bridge) crossing the Old Danube

Kagran is home to the Donau Zentrum, Vienna's largest shopping centre, which was opened in the southwest in 1975. The neighborhood features multiple sports clubs, including Turnverein Kagran and the football club Hellas Kagran, as well as a sports hall that offers basketball, volleyball, badminton, futsal, and other sports.

The Old Danube in the west, along with the Badeteich Süßenbrunn Campingplatz and Badeteich Jessernig lakes, provides swimming opportunities. The Kagraner Brücke (Kagran Bridge) spans the Old Danube, linking Kagran with Kaisermühlen.

There are three U-Bahn stations in the town, Kagran, opposite the Donau Zentrum, Kagraner Platz, and Rennbahnweg, all on the U1.
