= Hirschstetten =

Part of Donaustadt, Vienna, Austria

Coordinates: 48°14′20″N 16°29′00″E

Coat of arms

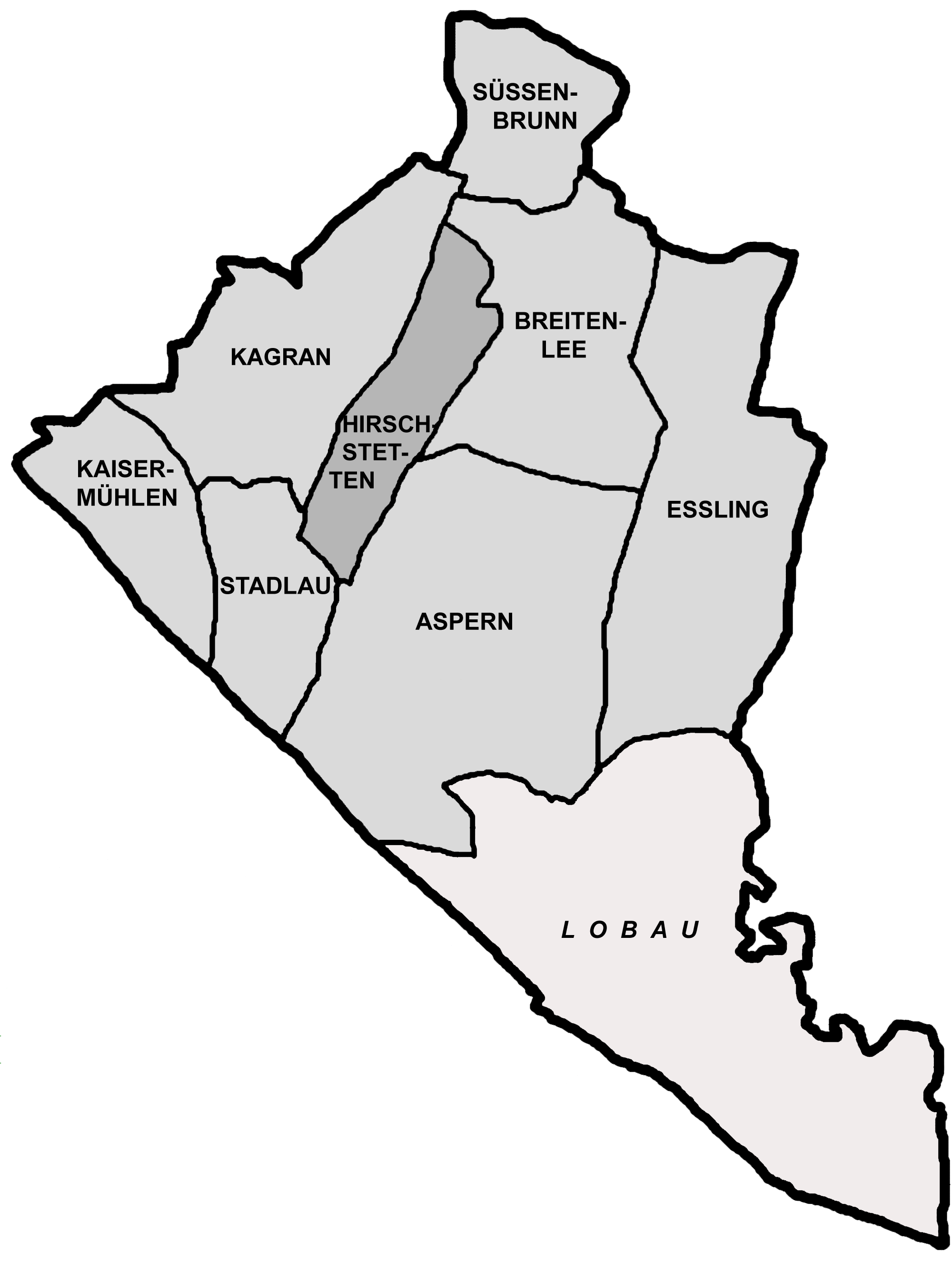
Location within Donaustadt

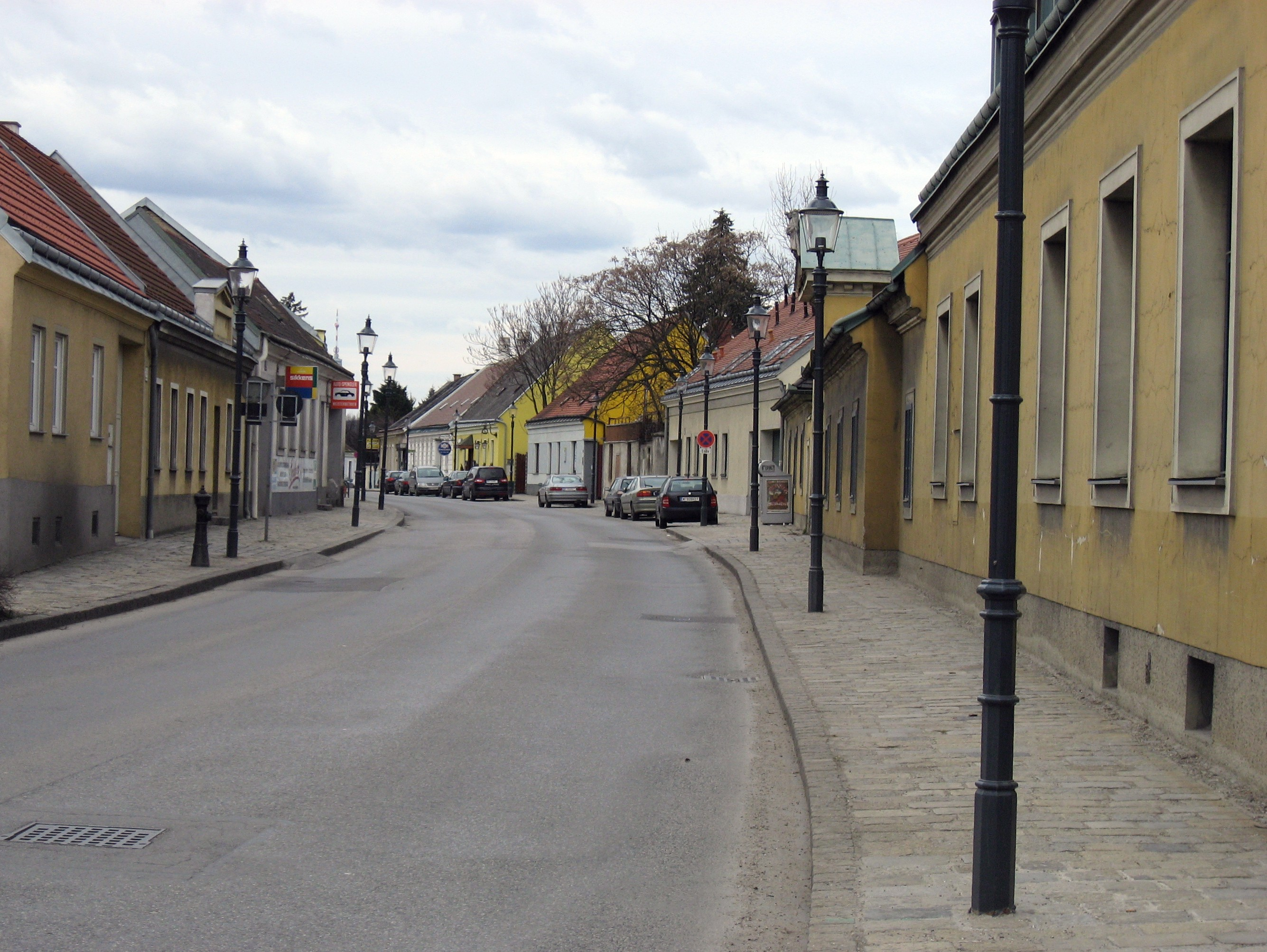
The historic centre.

Hirschstetten is a neighbourhood in Vienna, Austria, within Donaustadt, the 22nd district of Vienna. It has a population of 20,622 and covers 5.52 km^{2}.

== History ==
The town was founded in 1158 as a linear settlement. Hirschstetten was often flooded due to its proximity to the then-unregulated Danube. In 1809, during the Battle of Aspern-Essling in the War of the Fifth Coalition against Napoleon, the town was partly destroyed. Hirschstetten grew in size in the 1870s after the Danube regulation and the creation of the Marchegger Ostbahn railway line.

In 1904, Hirschstetten was merged into Floridsdorf, the 21st district of Vienna. In 1938, the neighbourhood became part of the 22nd district of Groß-Enzersdorf, part of the new Greater Vienna. In 1945, the town was almost completely destroyed in a bombing attack. In 1954, the 22nd district was reduced, and renamed Donaustadt.

== Geography ==
Hirschstetten borders four other subdivisions of Donaustadt: Kagran, Breitenlee, Aspern, and Stadlau. Covering an area of 5.52 km², it is the sixth largest of Donaustadt’s nine districts.

== Features ==
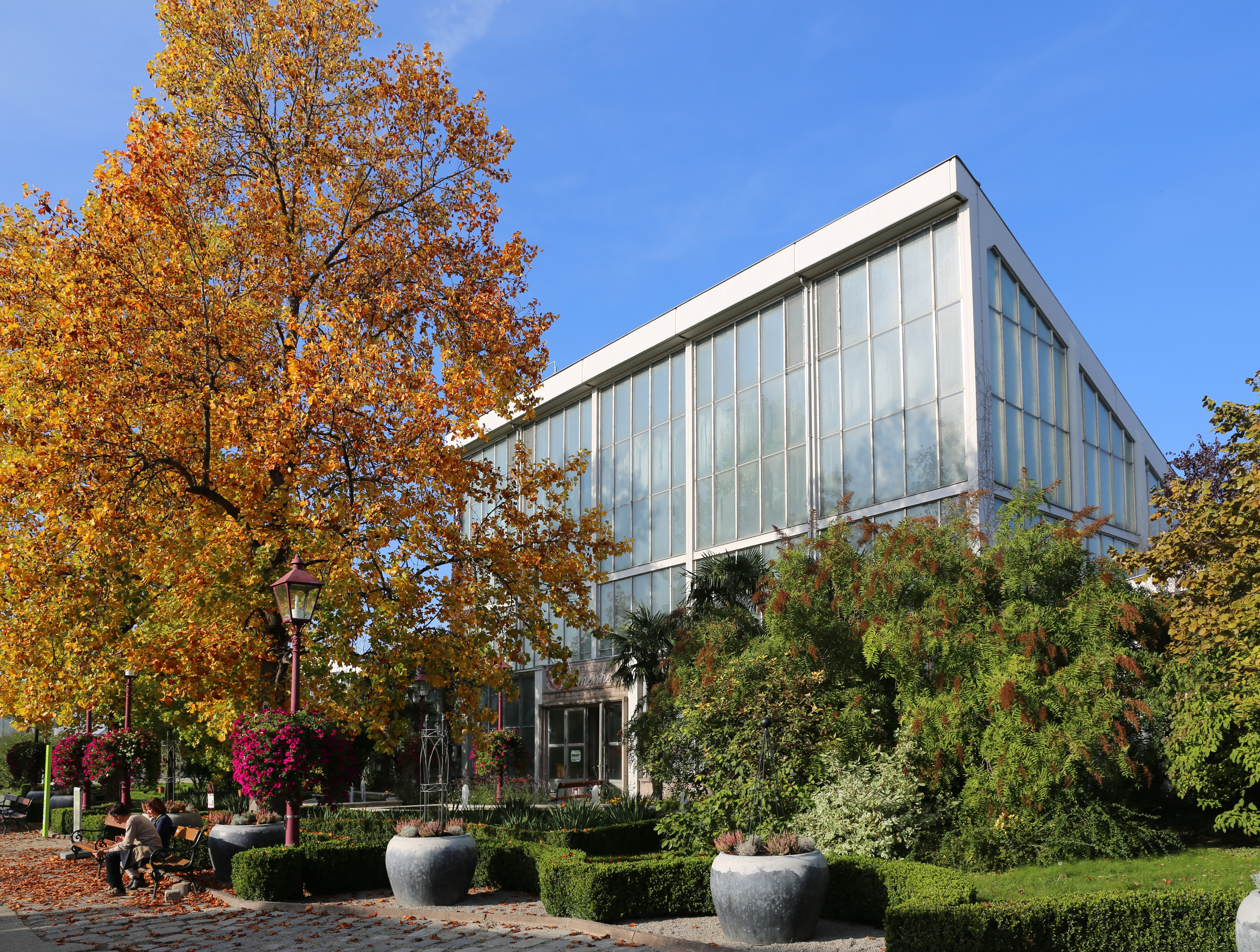
The palm house in the botanical gardens.

Blumengärten Hirschstetten, a botanical garden, was opened to the public in 2002, aften having been a facility for growing the flowers needed for public plantings since the 1950s. The gardens feature an English rose garden, tree ferns, a tropical palm house, and other.

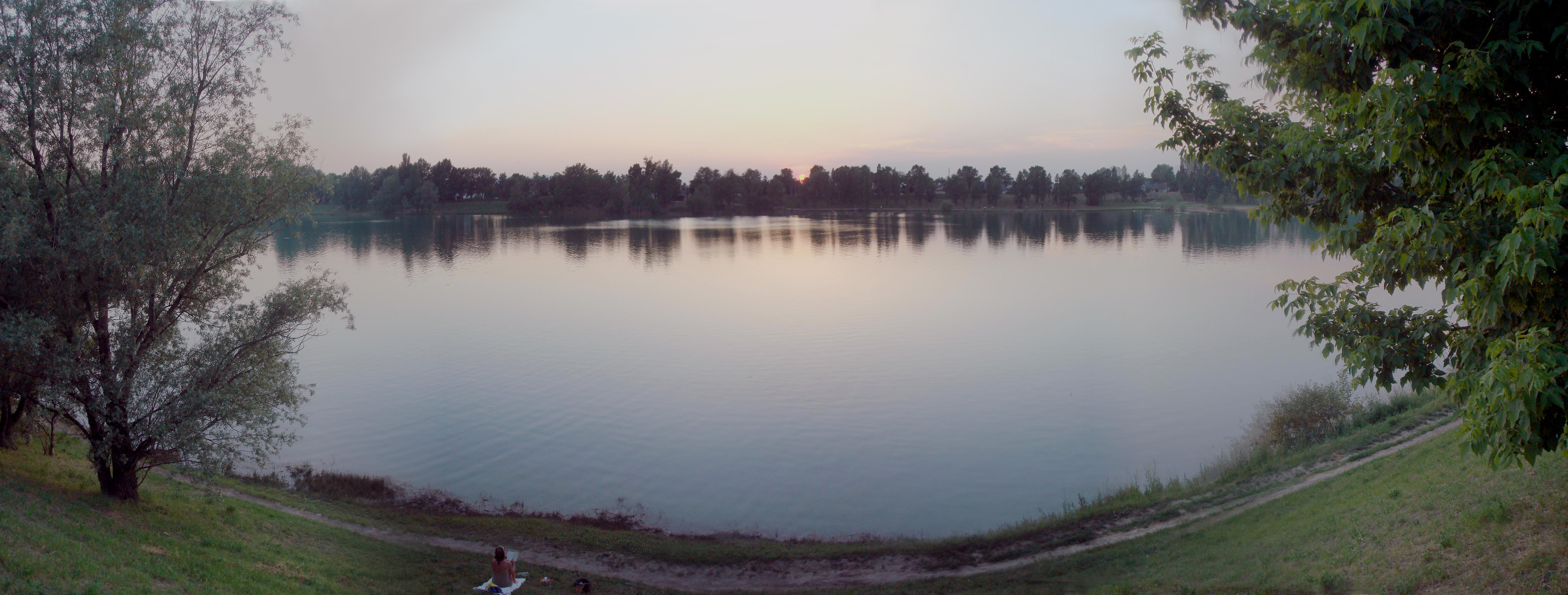
Badeteich Hirschstetten

Badeteich Hirschstetten is a 127,000 m² lake in Hirschstetten, near the gardens. The lake includes a children's playground, a dog park, and a dedicated dog bathing area.

The historic center of the town is a protected zone. Schloss Hirschstetten, a Baroque castle built in the 18th century, was destroyed in an American bombing raid in 1945. It was later replaced by Pfarrkirche Hirschstetten, the town's parish church.

Hirschstetten is served by multiple bus lines, as well as tram lines 26 and 27, which pass through Hirschstetten, connecting Seestadt to Strebersdorf in northern Floridsdorf. The A23 Autobahn, known as the Südosttangente, enters Hirschstetten from the west before turning into the S2 Schnellstraße (expressway).
