= Marchfeld =

Geographical region in Eastern Austria

Coordinates: 48°17′0″N 16°38′0″E

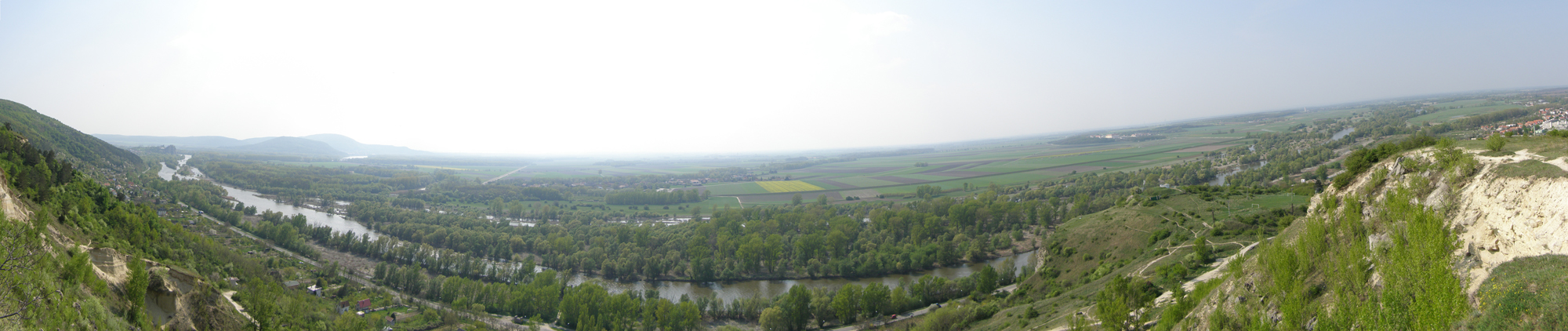
Morava Field

The Marchfeld (German pronunciation: [ˈmarçfɛlt]) is a 900 km² sedimentary basin in Lower Austria, that borders Vienna to the east. Geologically, the Marchfeld constitutes the northern half of the Vienna Basin, which spans about 60 kilometers along the Danube. The Marchfeld traditionally served as Vienna’s vegetable supplier and Austria’s breadbasket. Economically, it has been significant since the 1930s due to its oil and natural gas deposits. Architecturally, the region is notable for its Baroque churches, town squares, and the Marchfeld castles.

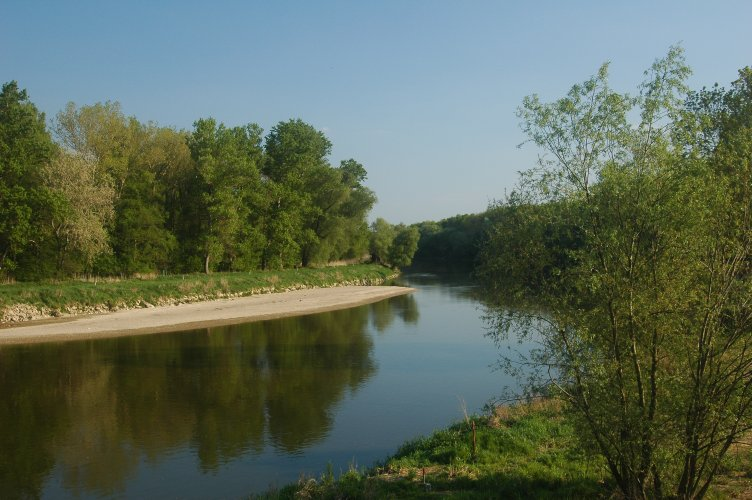
The Morava/March

== Geography ==
The region takes its name from the river March (Morava) in the east (derived from "Mark", meaning "border"), which serves as Austria's border with Slovakia. The term "Marchfeld" thus means "territory/plain by the border river". The southern boundary of the Marchfeld is formed by the Danube and its floodplains (e.g., the Lobau), while in the north, it is framed by the hilly landscape of the Weinviertel, stretching from the Bisamberg near Vienna to Angern an der March. The flat Austrian bank of the March up to Hohenau an der March and the tri-border area are also considered part of the broader Marchfeld region. The undeveloped outskirts of Vienna’s 21st and 22nd districts, both located on the left bank of the Danube, are also considered part of the Marchfeld.

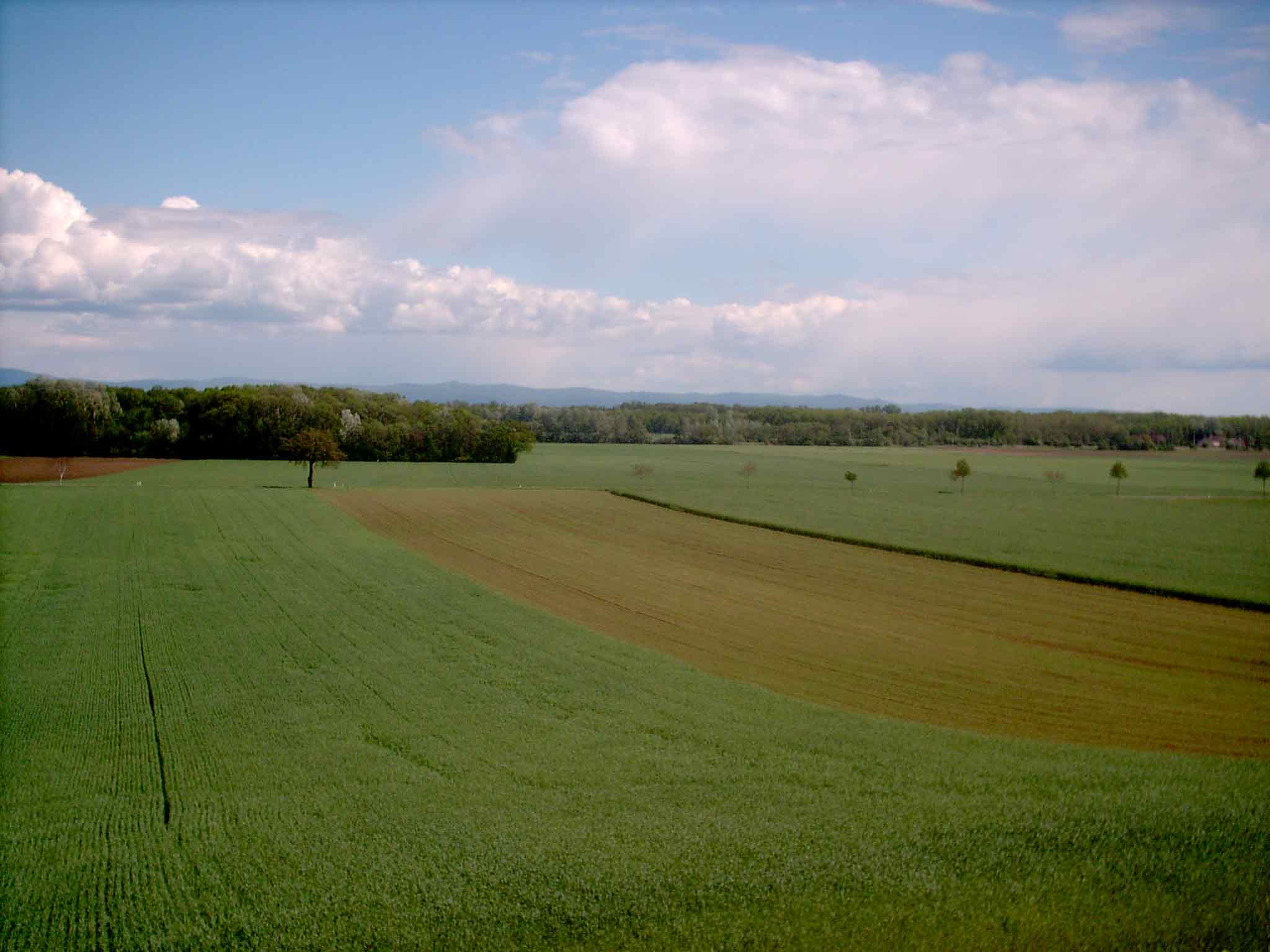
Near Dürnkrut

Towns in the Marchfeld include: Aderklaa, Andlersdorf, Deutsch-Wagram, Eckartsau, Engelhartstetten, Gänserndorf, Glinzendorf, Groß-Enzersdorf, Großhofen, Haringsee, Lassee, Leopoldsdorf im Marchfeld, Mannsdorf an der Donau, Marchegg, Markgrafneusiedl, Obersiebenbrunn, Orth an der Donau, Parbasdorf, Raasdorf, Strasshof an der Nordbahn, Untersiebenbrunn, Weiden an der March, and Weikendorf.

== History ==
In 1260, Ottokar II Přemysl of Bohemia defeated Béla IV of Hungary here. Ottokar was beaten in 1278 in the Battle on the Marchfeld against Rudolf I of Germany.

In the 16th century, Croats settled in the region (similar as in Burgenland), forming the ethnic group known as the Marchfeld Croats, which persisted until the mid-19th century.

In 1809, during the War of the Fifth Coalition, Austria fought against Napoleon at Aspern and Wagram. In 1837, the Emperor Ferdinand Northern Railway, Austria’s first steam railway, was put into operation in the Marchfeld. In 1870, the Laaer Ostbahn and Marchegger Ostbahn railways were opened. In 1918/1919, the former emperor Karl I spent his last weeks in Austria at Eckartsau Castle before his forced emigration.

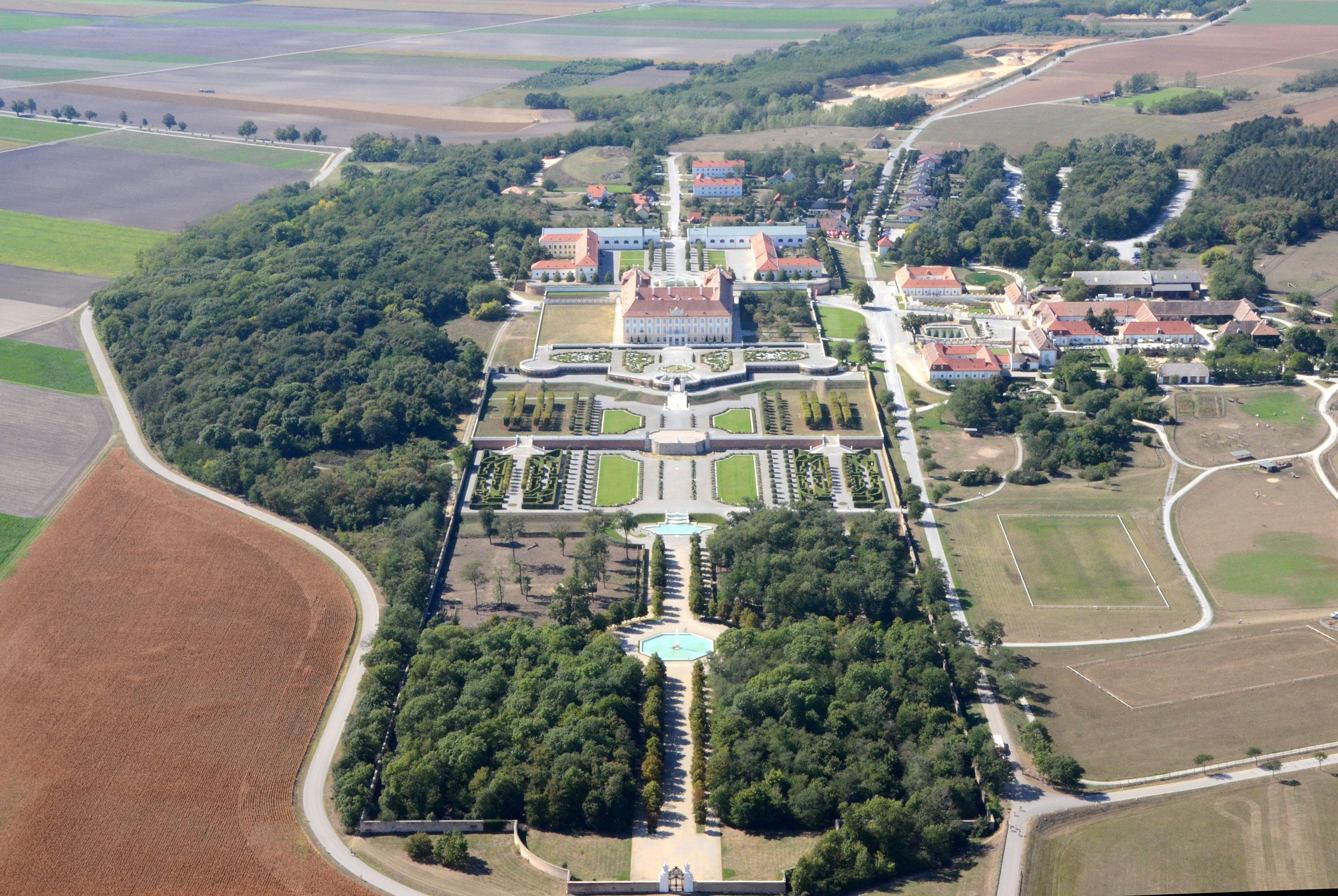
Schlosshof

=== Marchfeld Castles ===
The term Marchfeldschlösser is used to promote six castles in the Marchfeld region for tourism. These castles include Schloss Hof, Schloss Niederweiden, Schloss Orth, Schloss Marchegg, Schloss Eckartsau, and Schloss Obersiebenbrunn.
