= Dürnkrut, Austria =

Dürnkrut
- Municipality
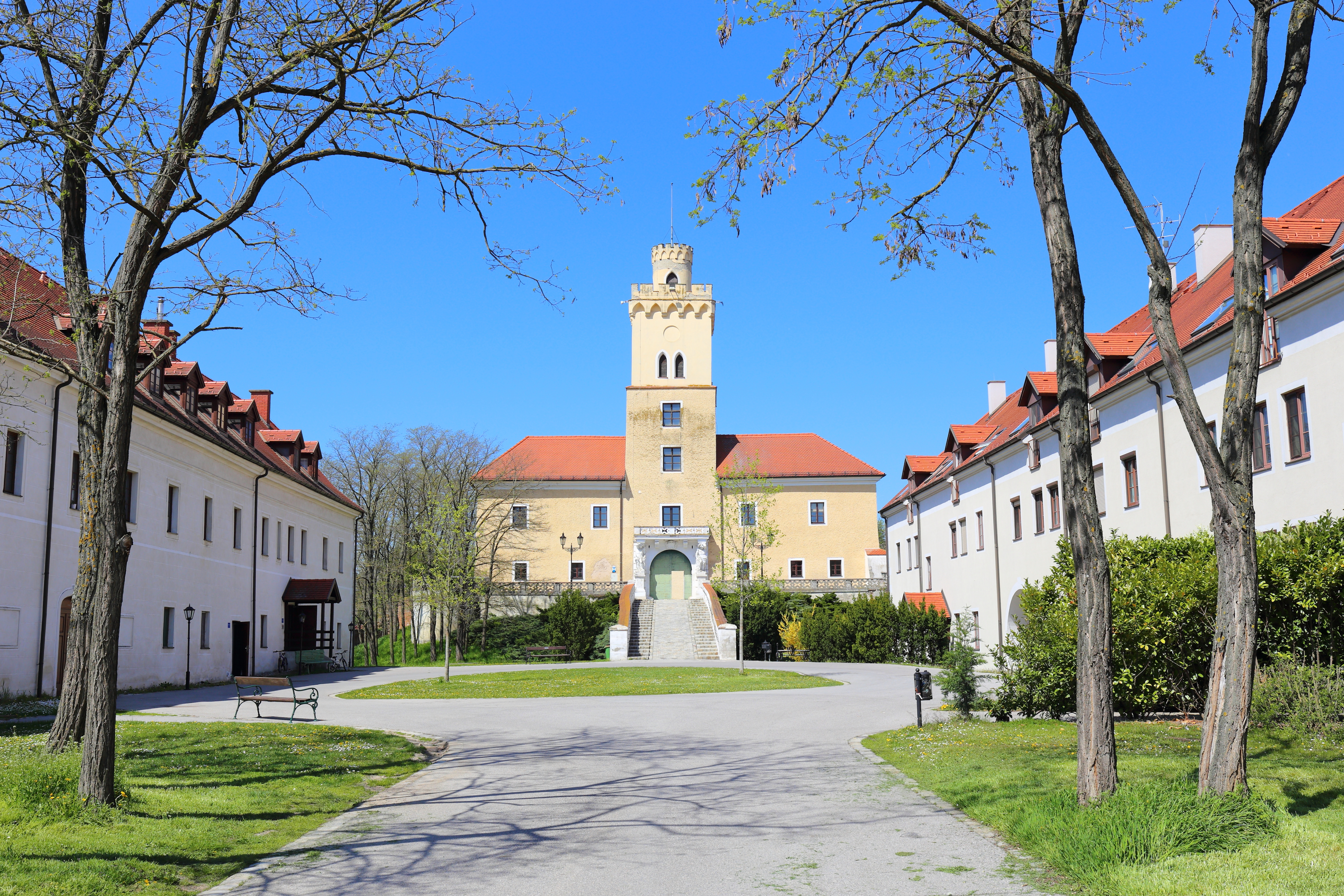
- Dürnkrut Palace

- Coat of arms

- Location within Austria
- Coordinates: 48°28′N 16°51′E
- Country: Austria
- State: Lower Austria
- District: Gänserndorf

Government
  - Mayor: Stefan Istvanek (SPÖ)

Area
  - Total: 30.39 km^{2} (11.73 sq mi)
- Elevation: 161 m (528 ft)

Population (2018-01-01)
  - Total: 2,267
  - Density: 74.60/km^{2} (193.2/sq mi)
- Time zone: UTC+1 (CET)
  - Summer (DST): UTC+2 (CEST)
- Postal code: 2263
- Area code: 02538
- Website: duernkrut.gv.at

Dürnkrut (Slovak: Kruta, Suchá Kruta, Czech: Suché Kruty) is a market town in the district of Gänserndorf in the Austrian state of Lower Austria. Castle Dürnkrut (pictured) is the most famous landmark of the town. The town is agricultural with some noteworthy businesses. Crops grown in the flatter areas are canola, corn, sunflowers and sugar beets. The rolling hills are planted with wine grapes by local vintners.

Dürnkrut is located on the March river, which often floods and also forms the border with Slovakia. The last big flood was in 2006, at which time many houses near to the river were flooded with 2 meters of water. Dürnkrut is located on the Austrian Railways Nordbahn line. Dürnkrut was home to a big sugar factory that made the sugar beets into refined sugar but it was closed down but some of the buildings are still standing. The wine street offers many old wines. The sister town of Waidendorf is located 2 km away.

== Subdivisions ==
- Dürnkrut
- Waidendorf

== Nearby municipalities ==
- Gajary
- Götzendorf, Velm-Götzendorf
- Jedenspeigen
- Waidendorf
- Angern an der March
- Zistersdorf

== See also ==
- Battle on the Marchfeld (also known as "Battle of Dürnkrut")
