= Hauskirchen =

- Municipality
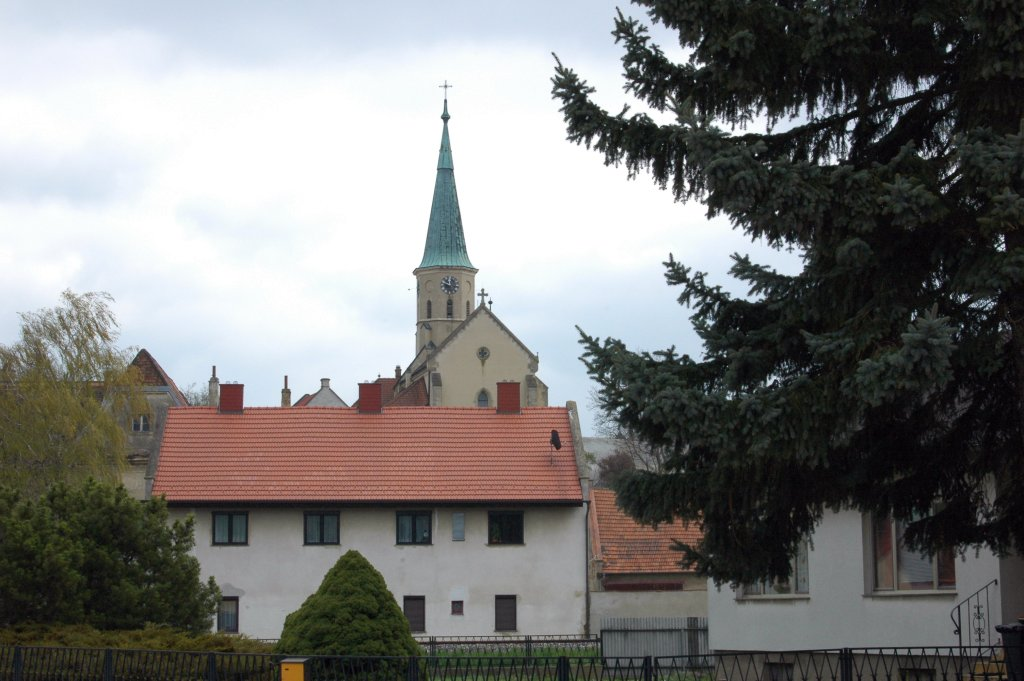

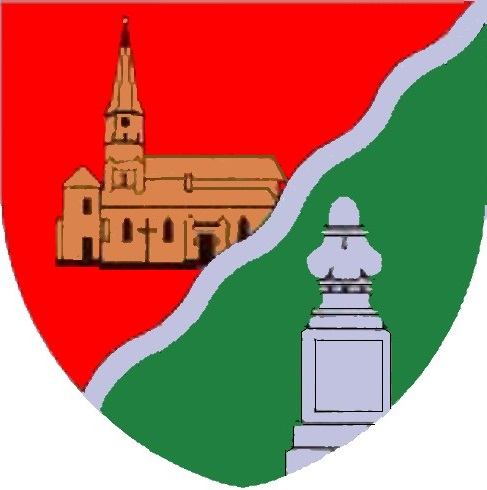
- Coat of arms

- Location within Austria
- Coordinates: 48°37′N 16°45′E
- Country: Austria
- State: Lower Austria
- District: Gänserndorf

Government
  - Mayor: Josef Huber

Area
  - Total: 22.02 km^{2} (8.50 sq mi)
- Elevation: 182 m (597 ft)

Population (2018-01-01)
  - Total: 1,248
  - Density: 56.68/km^{2} (146.8/sq mi)
- Time zone: UTC+1 (CET)
  - Summer (DST): UTC+2 (CEST)
- Postal code: 2184
- Area code: 02533
- Website: www.hauskirchen-online.com

Hauskirchen is a town in the district of Gänserndorf in the Austrian state of Lower Austria.

== Geography ==
Hauskirchen lies in the northeast Weinviertel in Lower Austria 15 kilometers east of Mistelbach. The Zaya River runs through the municipality. The area covers 22.04 square kilometers. Only about 3.95 percent of the municipality is forested.

== Constituent communities ==
The municipality comprises the three villages (number of inhabitants as of January 1, 2015)

- Hauskirchen (588)
- Prinzendorf Zaya (485)
- Rannersdorf an der Zaya (170)

Hauskirchen is surrounded of the communities Großkrut, Neusiedl an der Zaya, Wilfersdorf and Zistersdorf.

== History ==
An early written records tells of the construction of a church and of the establishment of a parish in 1150 by Hugo von Liechtenstein. In 1723, Baron Dermot Kavanagh († 1739) of Ballyane bought the manor of Hauskirchen from Prince Joseph von Liechtenstein. Part of the Irish military diaspora, he served in the Imperial Army and as imperial and royal Kämmerer, eventually rising to the rank of lieutenant field marshal. Kavanagh and his wife Felicitas are commemorated in Hauskirchen by a wall tablet in the parish church of St Lawrence.

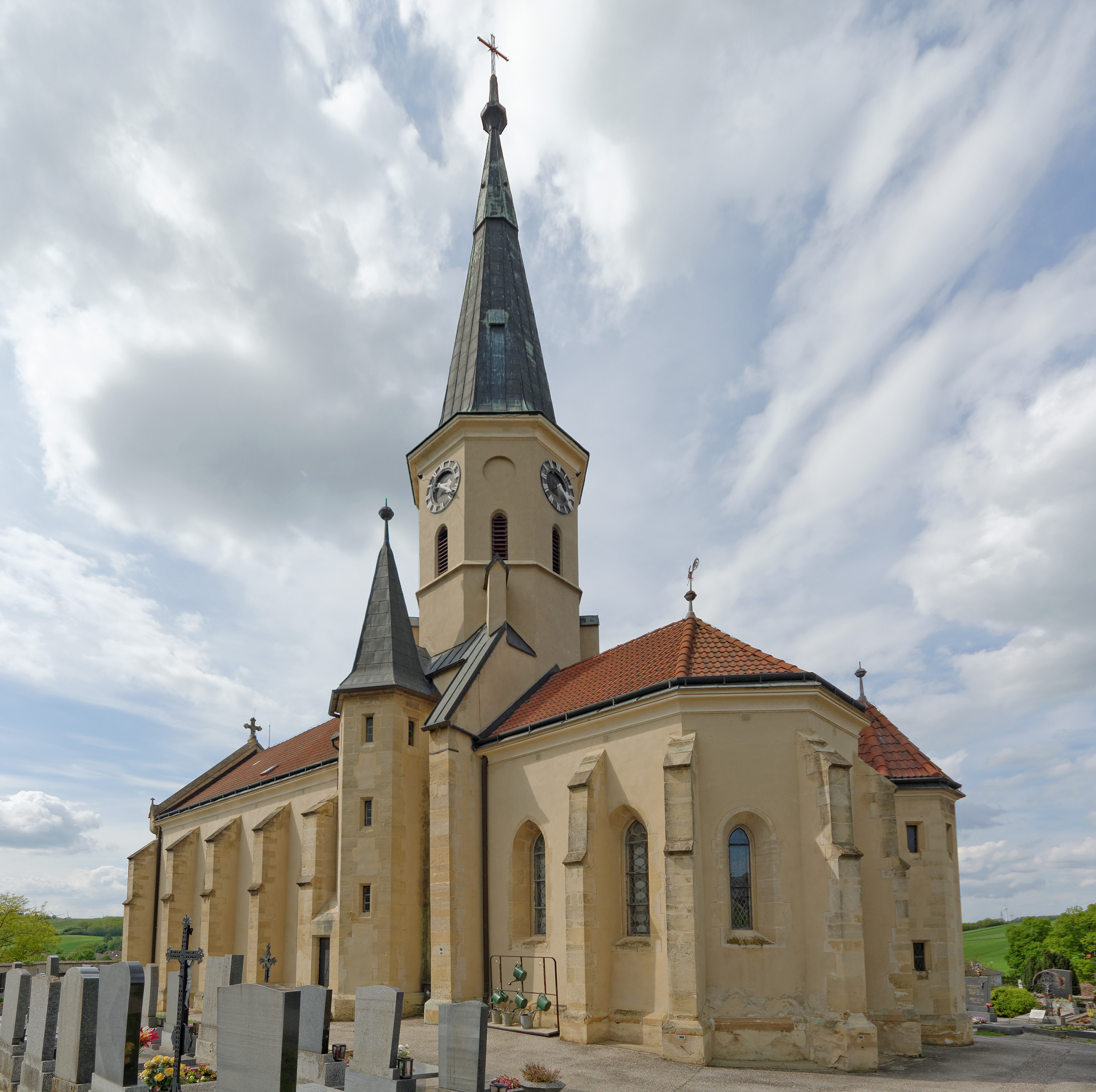
Hauskirchen, parish church of St Lawrence

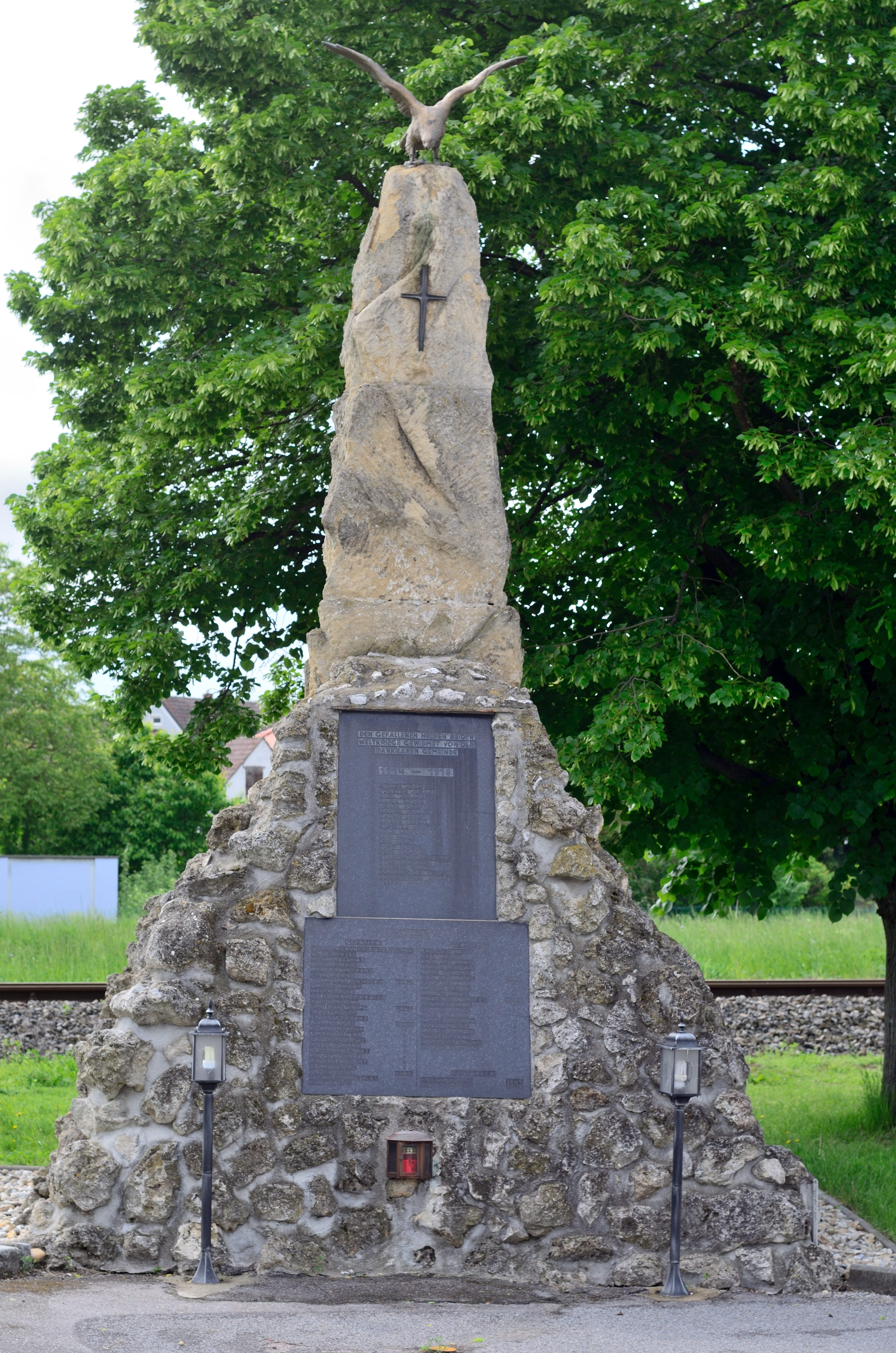
Hauskirchen War memorial

== Population Development ==
According to the results of the 2001 census, there were 1265 inhabitants.

- 1991 1273 inhabitants
- 1981 1364 inhabitants
- 1971 1465 inhabitants.

== Politics ==
In the council is after the local elections in Lower Austria 2015 the following mandate distribution (total of 19 seats):

- ÖVP 16
- SPÖ 3
