= Groß-Schweinbarth =

- Municipality
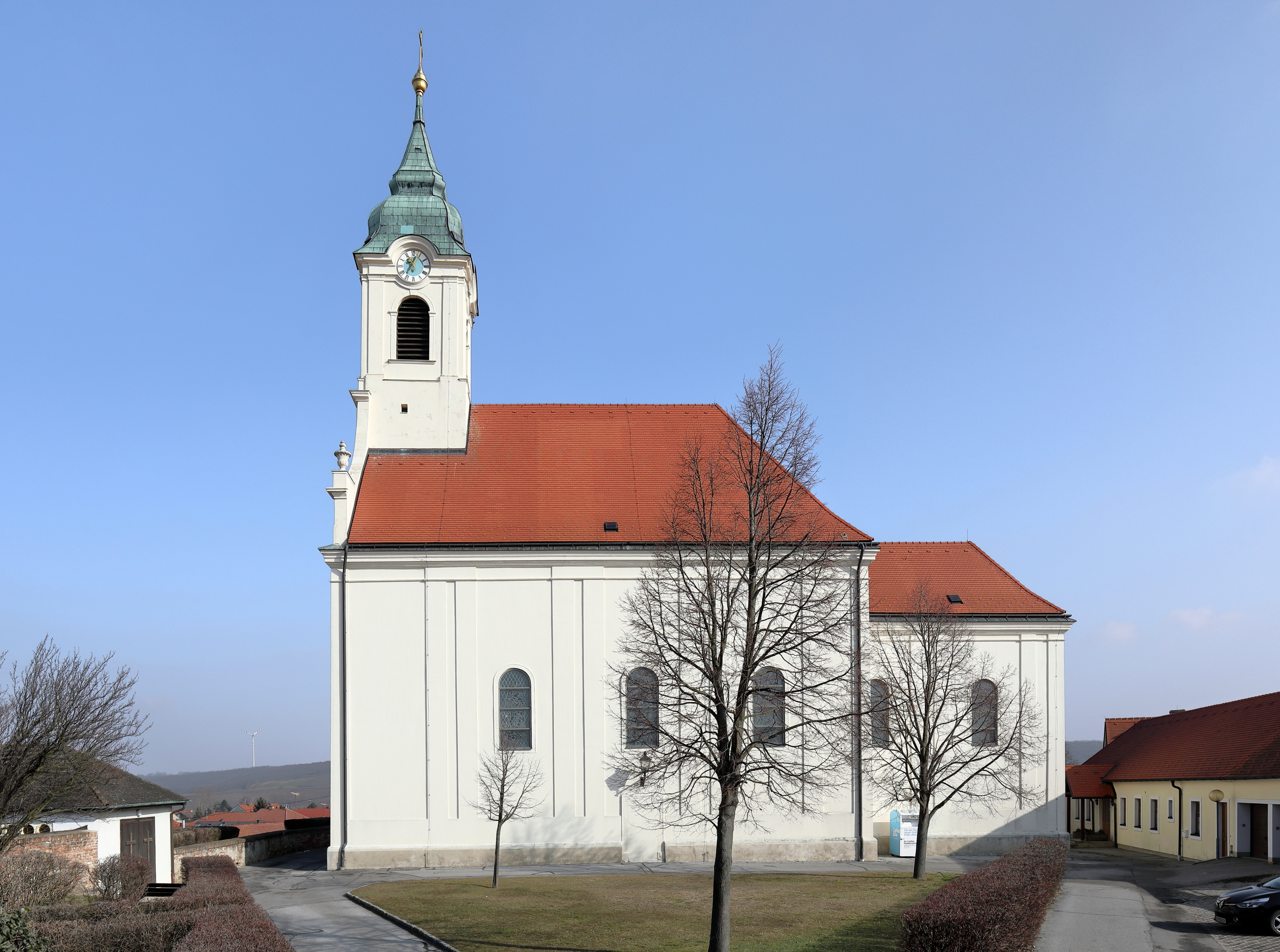
- Groß-Schweinbarth parish church

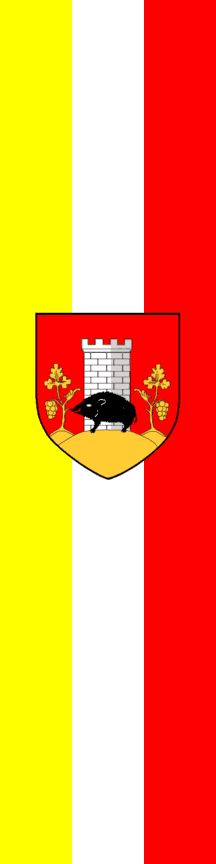
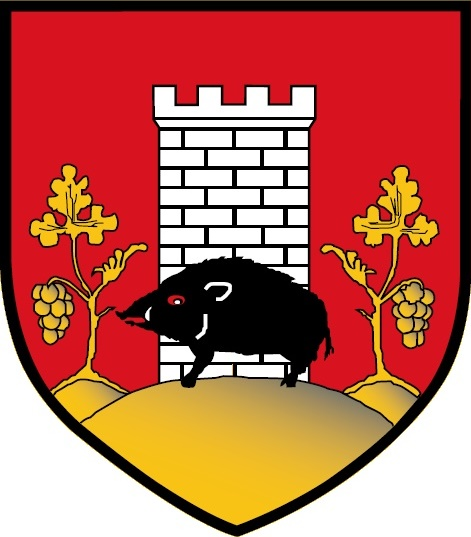
- Flag Coat of arms

- Location within Austria
- Coordinates: 48°25′N 16°38′E
- Country: Austria
- State: Lower Austria
- District: Gänserndorf

Government
  - Mayor: Marianne Rickl-List

Area
  - Total: 24.95 km^{2} (9.63 sq mi)
- Elevation: 182 m (597 ft)

Population (2018-01-01)
  - Total: 1,245
  - Density: 49.90/km^{2} (129.2/sq mi)
- Time zone: UTC+1 (CET)
  - Summer (DST): UTC+2 (CEST)
- Postal code: 2221
- Area code: 02289
- Website: www.gross-schweinbarth.at

Groß-Schweinbarth is a town in the district of Gänserndorf in the Austrian state of Lower Austria.

== Geography ==
Groß-Schweinbarth lies in the hills between Bad Pirawarth and Gänserndorf in Lower Austria. About 46.3 percent of the municipality is forested.
