= Hohenruppersdorf =

- Municipality
- Coat of arms

- Location within Austria
- Coordinates: 48°27′N 16°39′E
- Country: Austria
- State: Lower Austria
- District: Gänserndorf

Government
  - Mayor: Hermann Gindl

Area
  - Total: 21.37 km^{2} (8.25 sq mi)
- Elevation: 244 m (801 ft)

Population (2018-01-01)
  - Total: 910
  - Density: 43/km^{2} (110/sq mi)
- Time zone: UTC+1 (CET)
  - Summer (DST): UTC+2 (CEST)
- Postal code: 2223
- Area code: 02574

Hohenruppersdorf is a town in the district of Gänserndorf in the Austrian state of Lower Austria.

== Geography ==
Hohenruppersdorf lies in the hills of the eastern Weinviertel in Lower Austria, about 3 km east of Bad Pirawarth and Gaweinstal. About 30 percent of the municipality is forested.
