= Palterndorf-Dobermannsdorf =

- Municipality
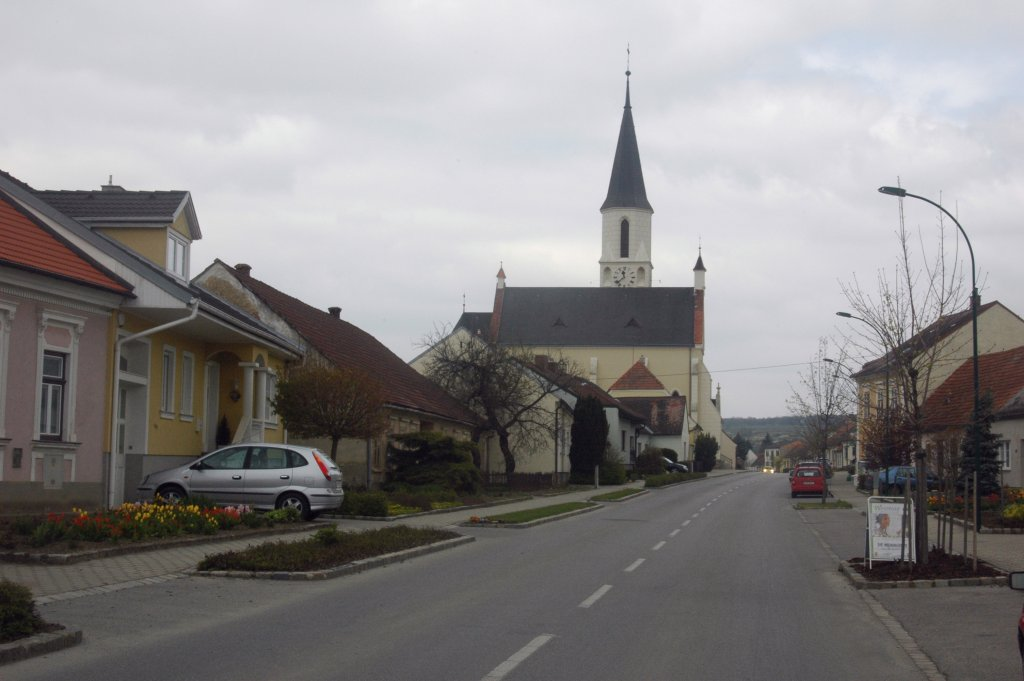

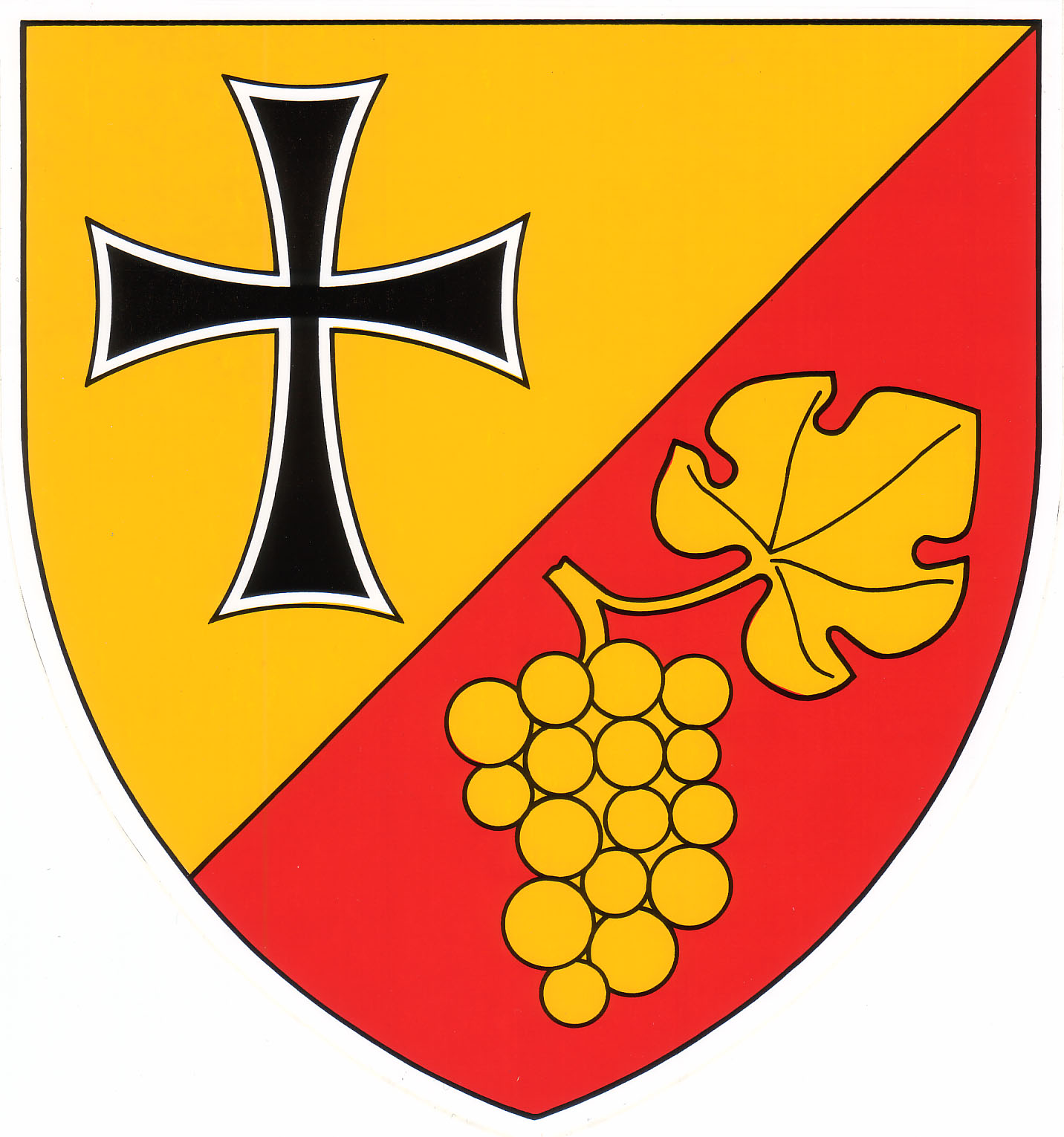
- Coat of arms

- Location within Austria
- Coordinates: 48°34′N 16°49′E
- Country: Austria
- State: Lower Austria
- District: Gänserndorf

Government
  - Mayor: Herbert Nowohradsky

Area
  - Total: 18.66 km^{2} (7.20 sq mi)
- Elevation: 164 m (538 ft)

Population (2018-01-01)
  - Total: 1,333
  - Density: 71.44/km^{2} (185.0/sq mi)
- Time zone: UTC+1 (CET)
  - Summer (DST): UTC+2 (CEST)
- Postal code: 2462
- Area code: 02533
- Website: www.palterndorf.at

Palterndorf-Dobermannsdorf is a town in the district of Gänserndorf in the Austrian state of Lower Austria.

== Geography ==
Palterndorf-Dobermannsdorf lies in the hills of the eastern Weinviertel on the historic Bernsteinstraße in the valley of the Zaya River. Only about 2.2 of the municipality is forested.
