= Auersthal =

Town in Austria

- Municipality
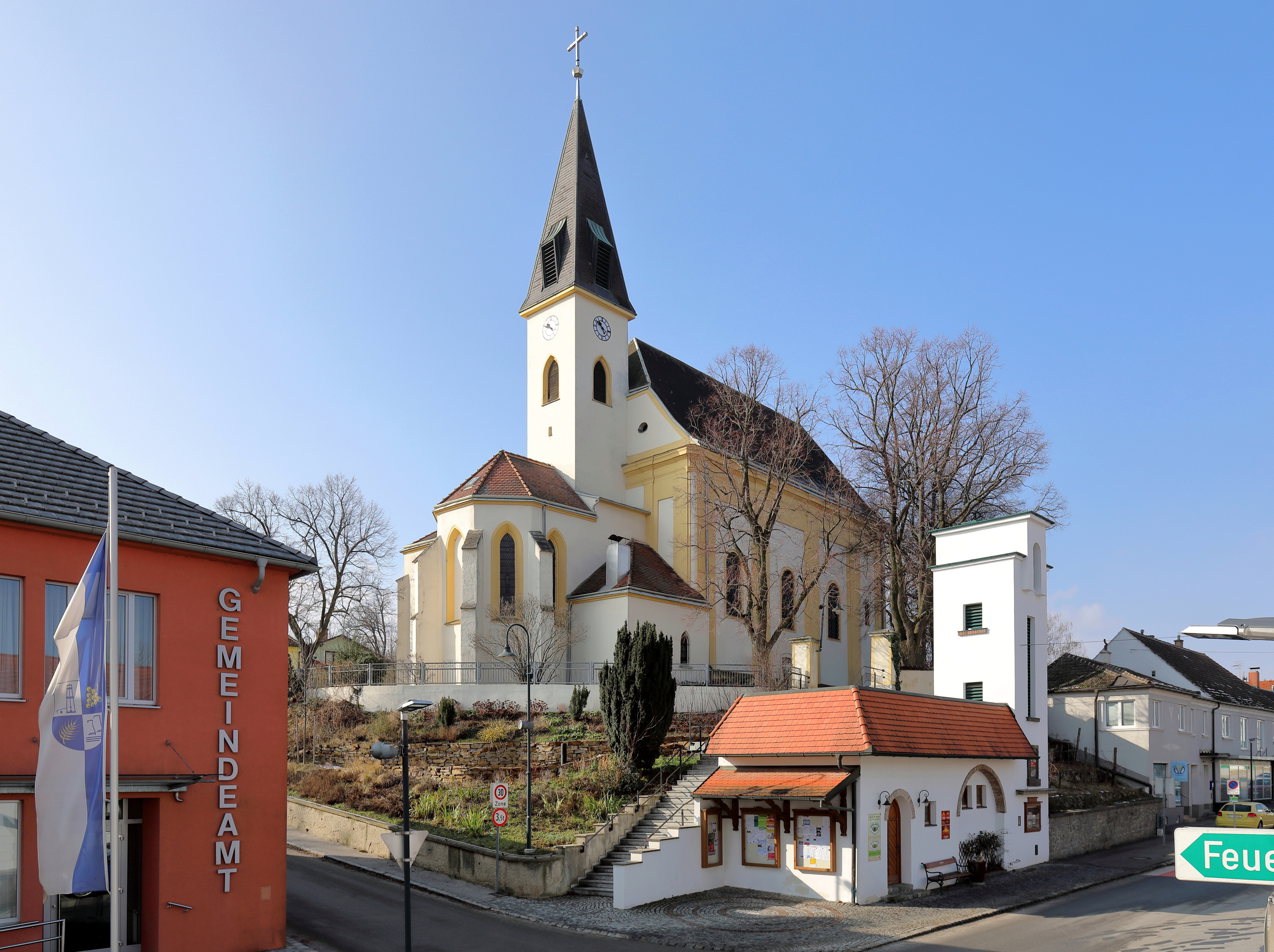
- Center of Auersthal

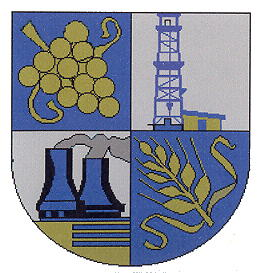
- Coat of arms

- Location within Austria
- Coordinates: 48°22′27″N 16°38′10″E
- Country: Austria
- State: Lower Austria
- District: Gänserndorf

Government
  - Mayor: Erich Hofer (ÖVP)

Area
  - Municipality: 15.19 km^{2} (5.86 sq mi)
- Elevation: 178 m (584 ft)

Population (2018-01-01)
  - Municipality: 1,932
  - Density: 127.2/km^{2} (329.4/sq mi)
  - Urban: 1,923
- Time zone: UTC+1 (CET)
  - Summer (DST): UTC+2 (CEST)
- Postal code: 2214
- Area code: 02288
- Website: www.auersthal.at

Auersthal is a town in the district of Gänserndorf in Lower Austria in Austria.

== Geography ==
Auersthal is situated in the East of Lower Austria in Weinviertel quarter, about 10 km east of Wolkersdorf. About 2.47 percent of the municipality is forested.

== Demographic Development ==
In the year 1991, the town had a population of 1804. In 2003, there were 1856 inhabitants and in 2016, the population had grown to 1923 people.

== Public Institutions ==
The town has a kindergarten, a primary school and a high school.

== Culture and Sights ==
- Saint Nicholas Church (catholic)
- There is a large number of chapels, wayside shrines and roadside memorials in and around the town which are carefully maintained. They have been catalogued and can be visited using certain walking routes and trails.
- The municipal office building was refurbished in 2003.
- The local amateur theater association "Theatergruppe Auersthal" was founded in 1983 and takes to the stage every year in November.
- There is a local music society, colloquially called a "Musikverein", a music school focused especially on brass music, as well as the local church choir.
