= Aderklaa =

- Municipality
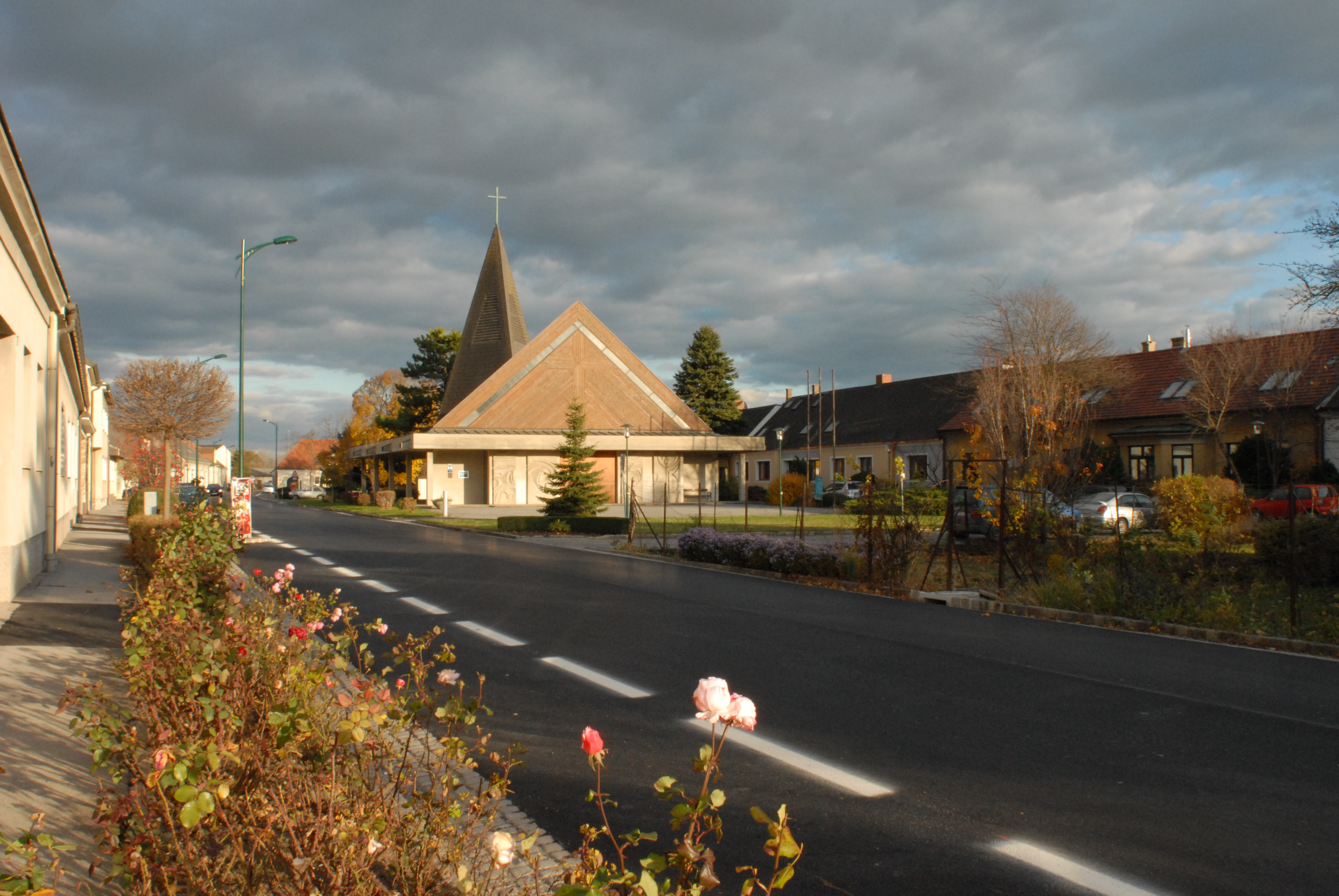
- Church in the center of the village

- Coat of arms

- Location within Austria
- Coordinates: 48°17′N 16°32′E
- Country: Austria
- State: Lower Austria
- District: Gänserndorf

Government
  - Mayor: Bernhard Wolfram (ÖVP)

Area
  - Total: 8.63 km^{2} (3.33 sq mi)
- Elevation: 157 m (515 ft)

Population (2018-01-01)
  - Total: 207
  - Density: 24.0/km^{2} (62.1/sq mi)
- Time zone: UTC+1 (CET)
  - Summer (DST): UTC+2 (CEST)
- Postal code: 2232
- Area code: 02247

Aderklaa is a town in the district of Gänserndorf in Lower Austria in Austria.

== Geography ==
Aderklaa lies in the Marchfeld in Lower Austria between Vienna and Deutsch Wagram. About 1.22 percent of the municipality is forested.
