= Markgrafneusiedl =

- Municipality
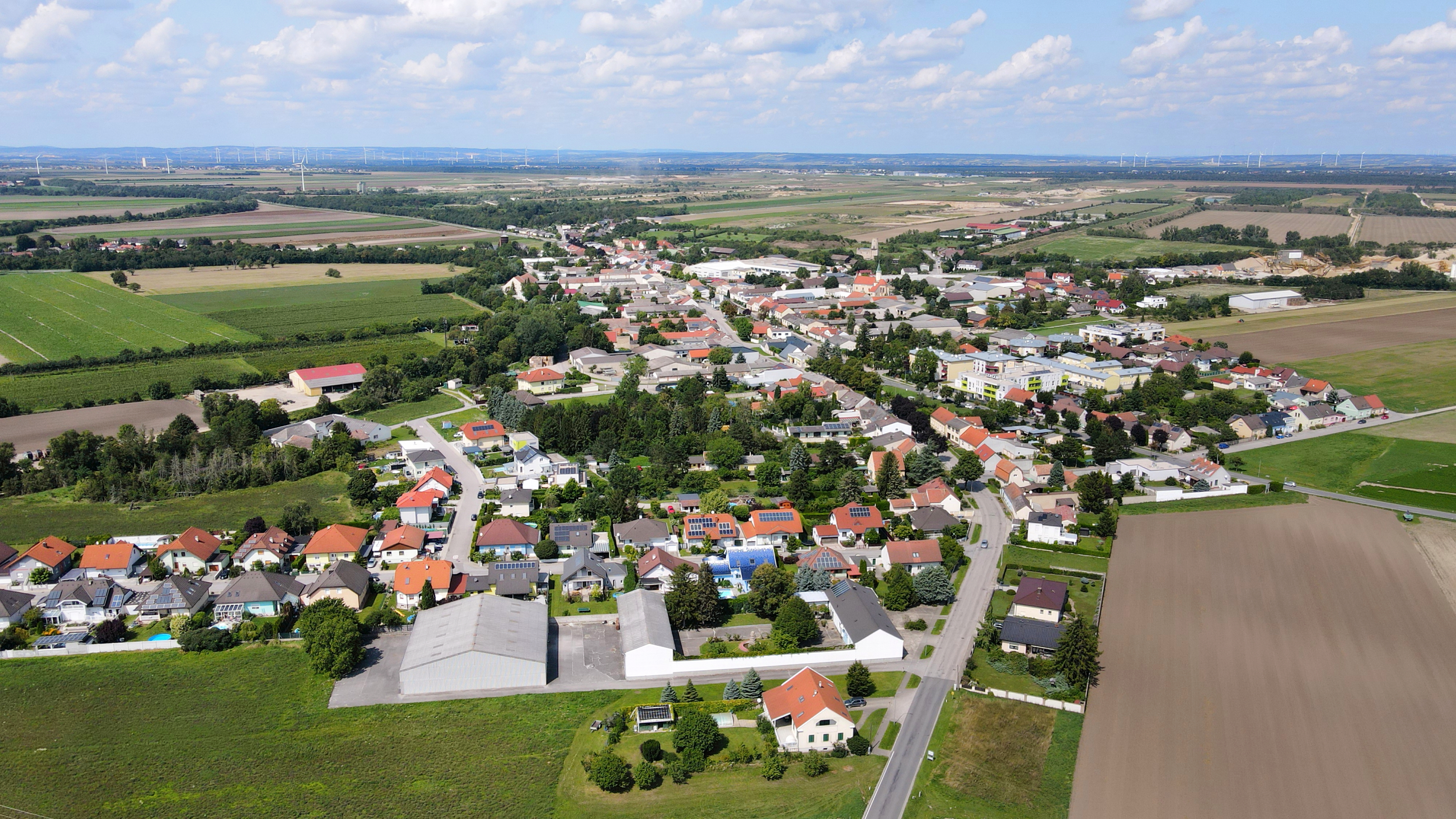
- Aerial view of Markgrafneusiedl

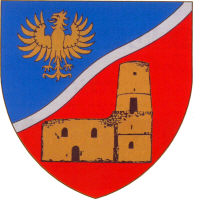
- Coat of arms

- Location within Austria
- Coordinates: 48°16′N 16°37′E
- Country: Austria
- State: Lower Austria
- District: Gänserndorf

Government
  - Mayor: Erwin Hrabal

Area
  - Total: 19.82 km^{2} (7.65 sq mi)
- Elevation: 154 m (505 ft)

Population (2018-01-01)
  - Total: 832
  - Density: 42.0/km^{2} (109/sq mi)
- Time zone: UTC+1 (CET)
  - Summer (DST): UTC+2 (CEST)
- Postal code: 2282
- Area code: 02248

Markgrafneusiedl is a town in the district of Gänserndorf in the Austrian state of Lower Austria.

During the battle of Wagram the town formed the left flank of the Austrian position, and it fell to the French after heavy fighting between IV Austrian Corps and the French III Corps.

== Geography ==
Markgrafneusiedl lies east of Vienna and southeast of Deutsch-Wagram in the Marchfeld, which is part of the Weinviertels. About 8.07 percent of the municipality is forested.
