= Raasdorf =

- Municipality
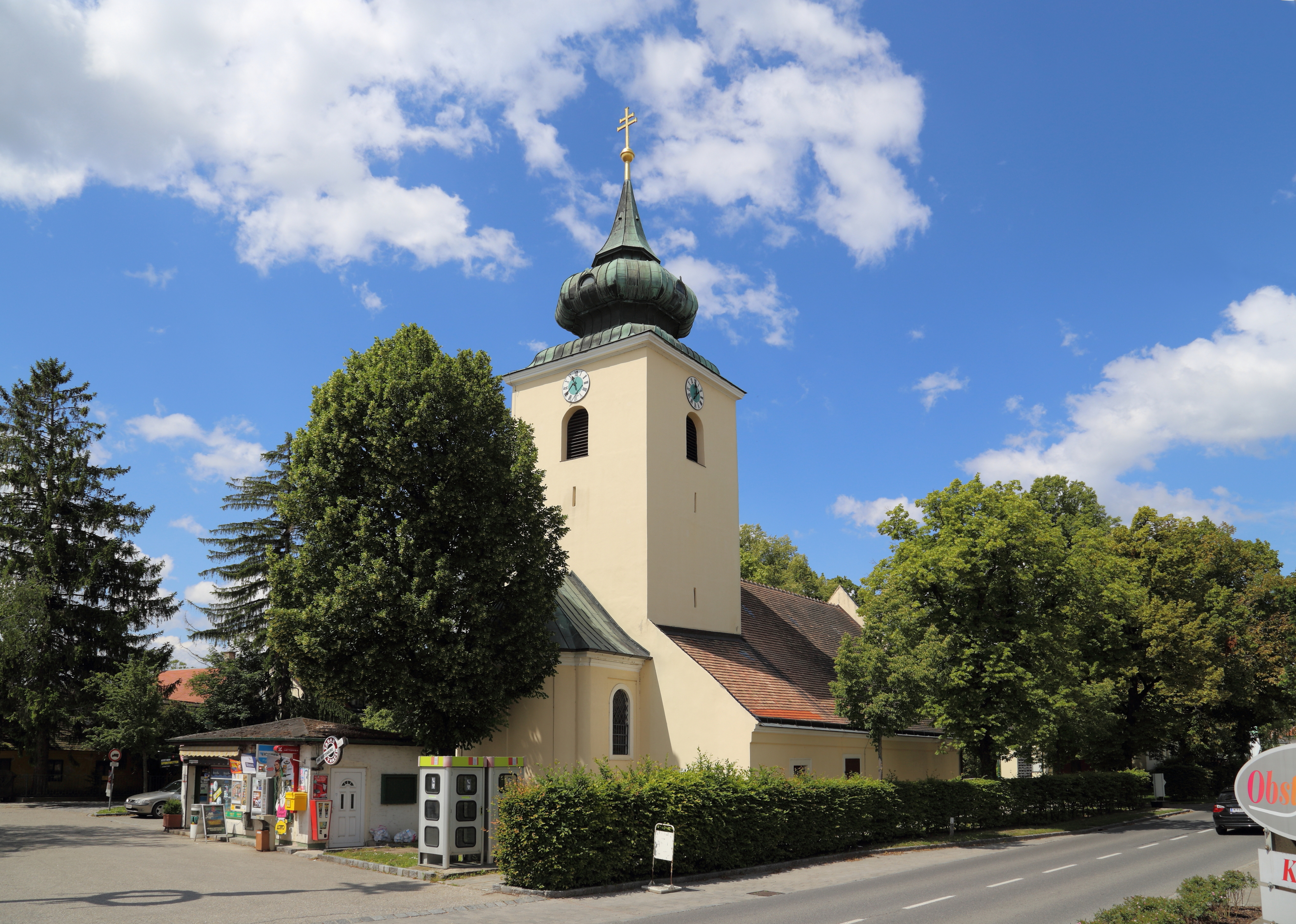
- Raasdorf parish church

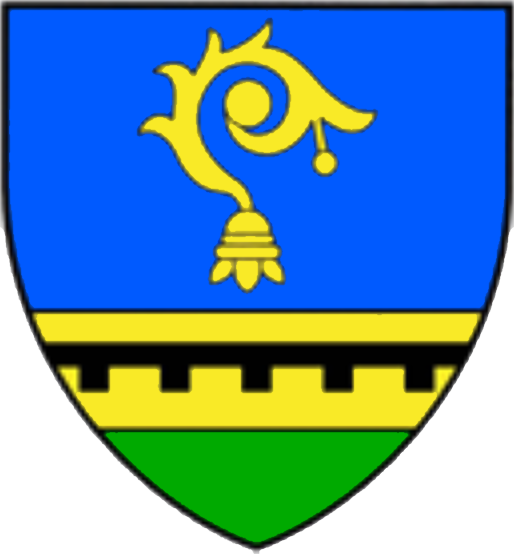
- Coat of arms

- Location within Austria
- Coordinates: 48°15′N 16°34′E
- Country: Austria
- State: Lower Austria
- District: Gänserndorf

Government
  - Mayor: Walter Krutis

Area
  - Total: 13.21 km^{2} (5.10 sq mi)
- Elevation: 156 m (512 ft)

Population (2018-01-01)
  - Total: 645
  - Density: 48.8/km^{2} (126/sq mi)
- Time zone: UTC+1 (CET)
  - Summer (DST): UTC+2 (CEST)
- Postal code: 2281
- Area code: 02249
- Website: www.raasdorf.at

Raasdorf is a town in the district of Gänserndorf in the Austrian state of Lower Austria.

== Geography ==
Raasdorf lies in the Weinviertel in Lower Austria. Only about 0.84 percent of the municipality is forested.
