= Neusiedl an der Zaya =

- Municipality
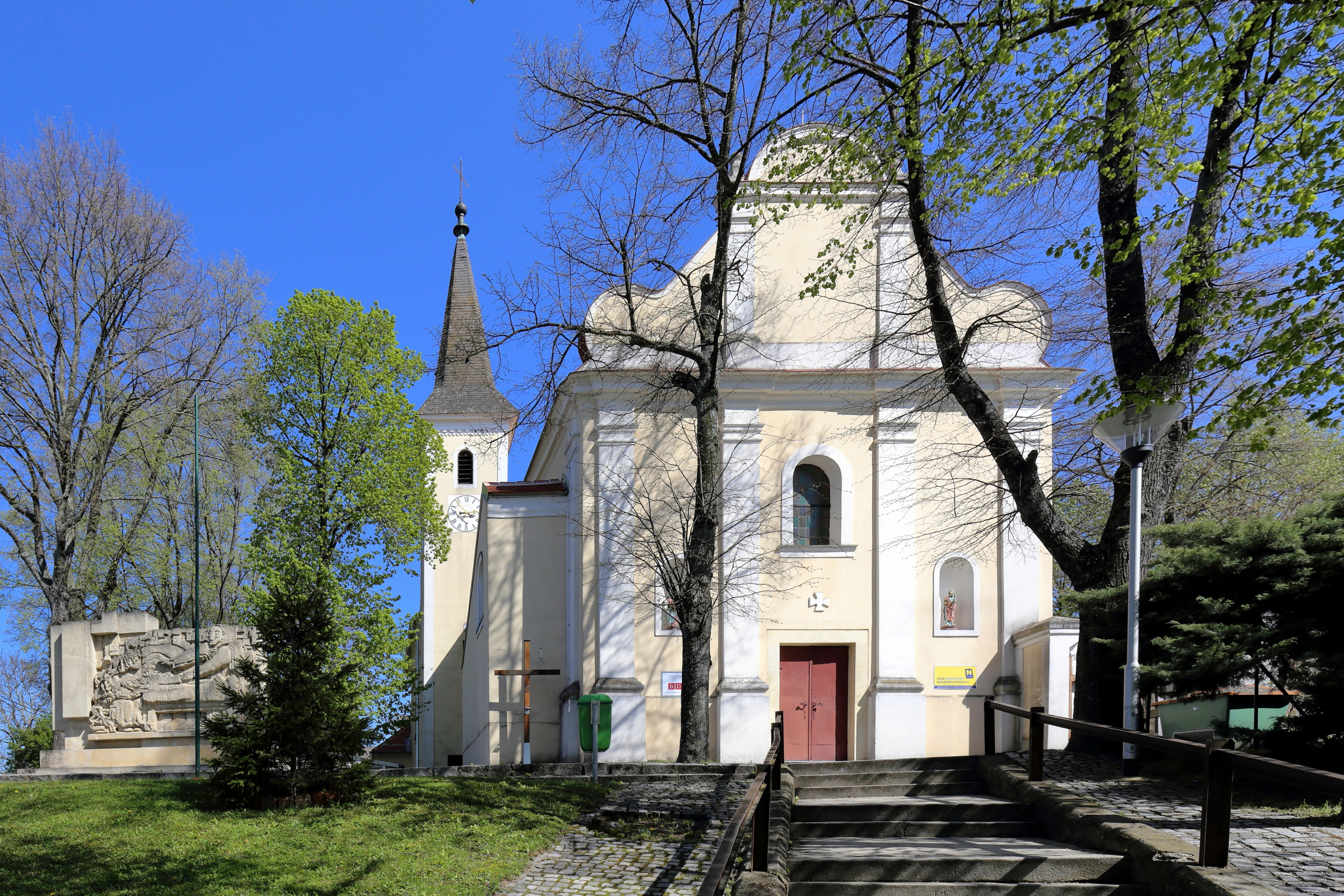
- Neusiedl an der Zaya parish church

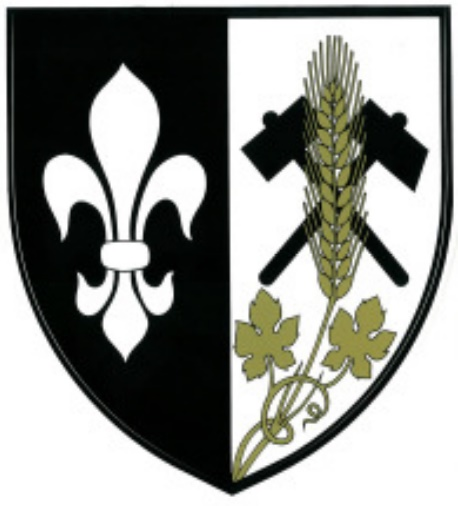
- Coat of arms

- Location within Austria
- Coordinates: 48°38′N 16°48′E
- Country: Austria
- State: Lower Austria
- District: Gänserndorf

Government
  - Mayor: Josef Schweinberger

Area
  - Total: 17.6 km^{2} (6.8 sq mi)
- Elevation: 175 m (574 ft)

Population (2018-01-01)
  - Total: 1,252
  - Density: 71.1/km^{2} (184/sq mi)
- Time zone: UTC+1 (CET)
  - Summer (DST): UTC+2 (CEST)
- Postal code: 2183
- Area code: 02533

Neusiedl an der Zaya is a town in the district of Gänserndorf in the Austrian state of Lower Austria.

== Geography ==
Neusiedl an der Zaya lies in the hills of the northeast Weinviertel about 10 km west of Hohenau an der March. About 17.27 percent of the municipality is forested.

== See also ==
- Zaya
