= Drösing =

- Municipality
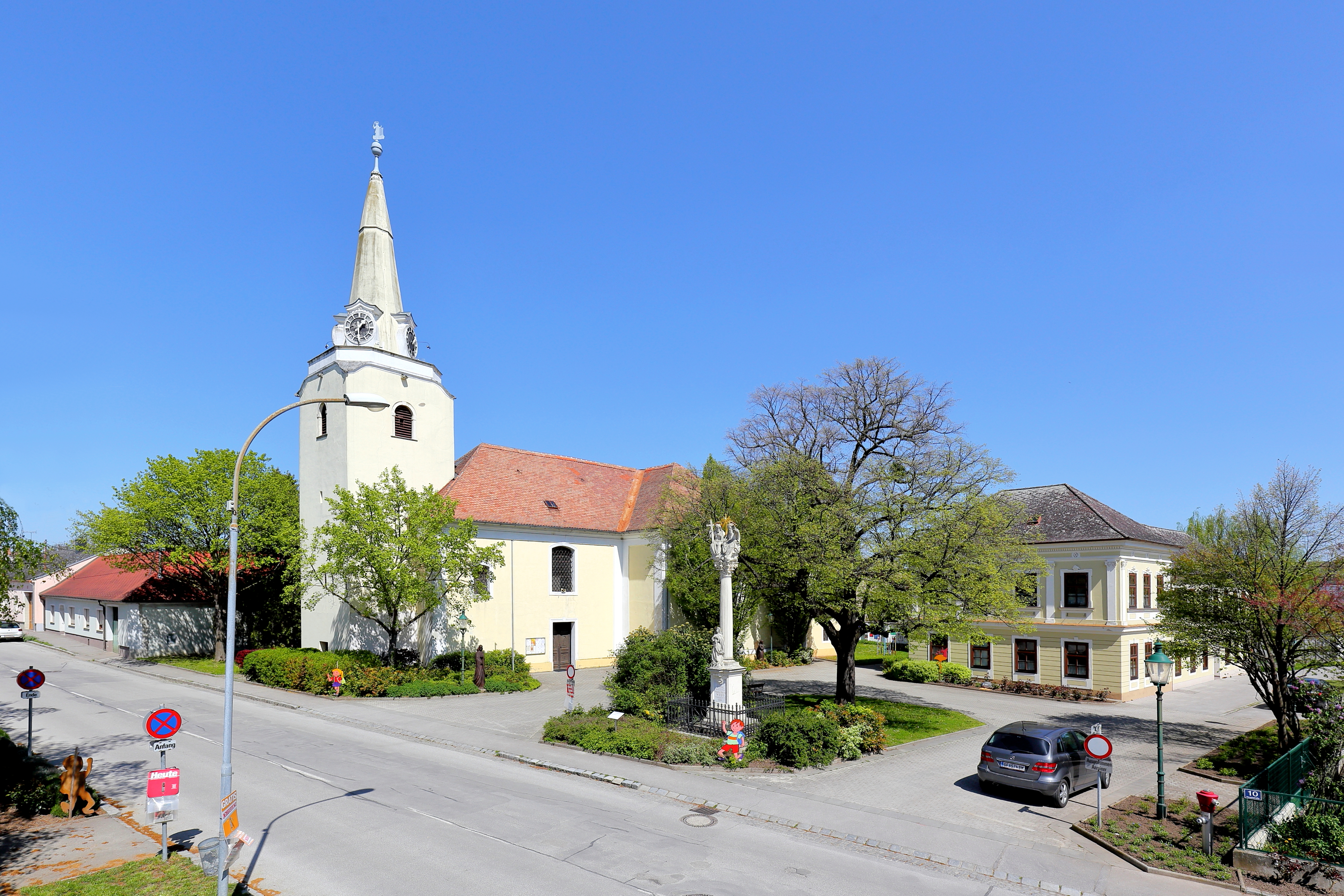

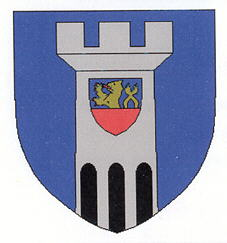
- Coat of arms

- Location within Austria
- Coordinates: 48°31′N 16°53′E
- Country: Austria
- State: Lower Austria
- District: Gänserndorf

Government
  - Mayor: Josef Kohl

Area
  - Total: 29.51 km^{2} (11.39 sq mi)
- Elevation: 158 m (518 ft)

Population (2018-01-01)
  - Total: 1,132
  - Density: 38.36/km^{2} (99.35/sq mi)
- Time zone: UTC+1 (CET)
  - Summer (DST): UTC+2 (CEST)
- Postal code: 2265
- Area code: 02536
- Website: www.droesing.at

Drösing (Slovak: Strezenice) is a town in the district of Gänserndorf in the Austrian state of Lower Austria.

== Geography ==
Drösing lies near Vienna on the Morava River on the Austrian–Slovak border. About 25.7 percent of the municipality is forested.

=== Subdivisions ===
- Drösing
- Waltersdorf an der March
