= Großhofen =

- Municipality
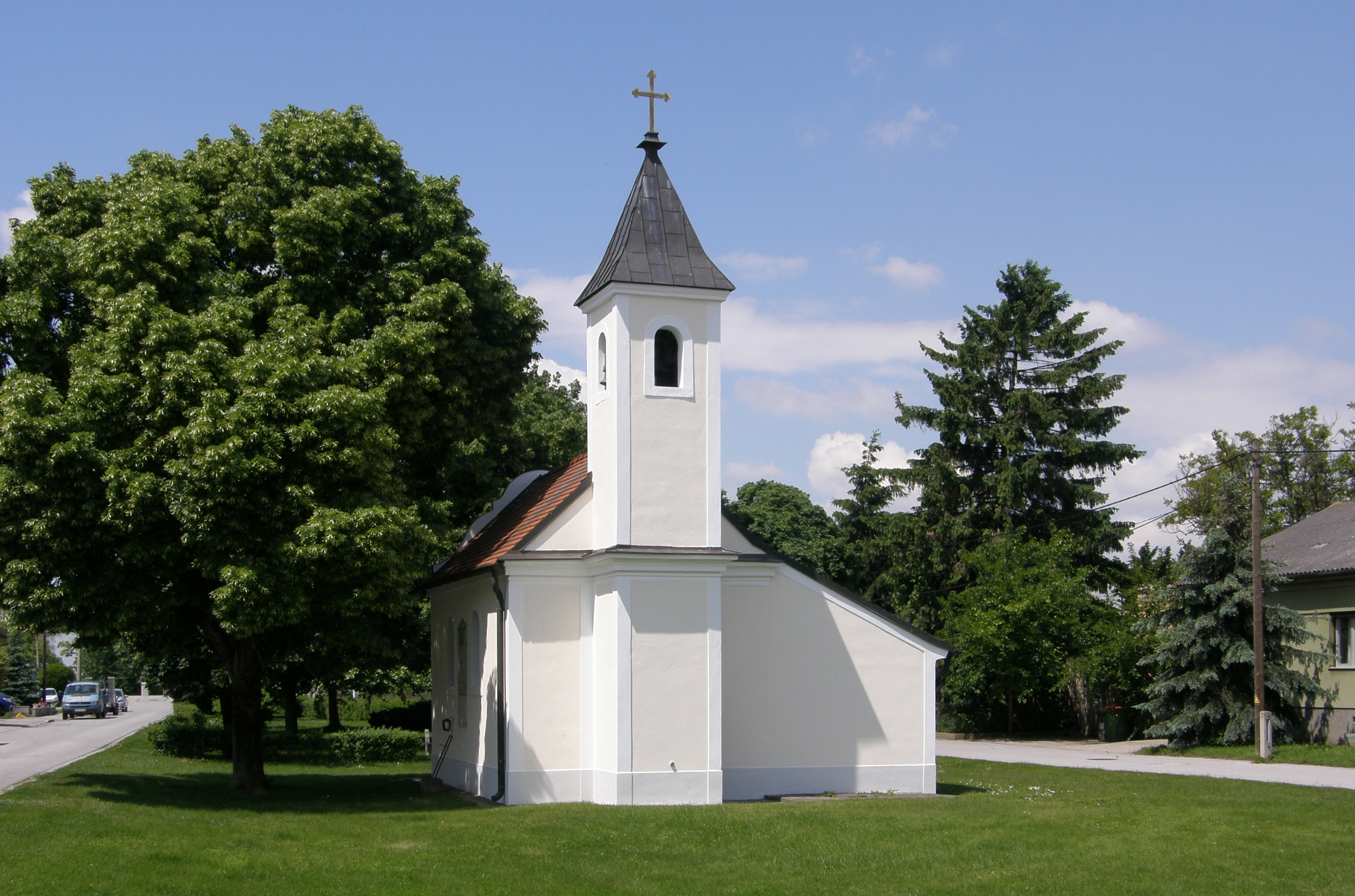
- Großhofen chapel

- Location within Austria
- Coordinates: 48°15′N 16°37′E
- Country: Austria
- State: Lower Austria
- District: Gänserndorf

Government
  - Mayor: Georg Weichand

Area
  - Total: 6.18 km^{2} (2.39 sq mi)
- Elevation: 153 m (502 ft)

Population (2018-01-01)
  - Total: 98
  - Density: 16/km^{2} (41/sq mi)
- Time zone: UTC+1 (CET)
  - Summer (DST): UTC+2 (CEST)
- Postal code: 2262
- Area code: 02248

Großhofen is a town in the district of Gänserndorf in the Austrian state of Lower Austria.

== Geography ==
Großhofen lies in the Weinviertel in Lower Austria. Only about 0.05 percent of the municipality is forested.

=== Populated places ===
The municipality of Großhofen consists of the following populated place (with population in brackets as of 1 January 2022): being the village of Großhofen (102)
