= Glinzendorf =

- Municipality
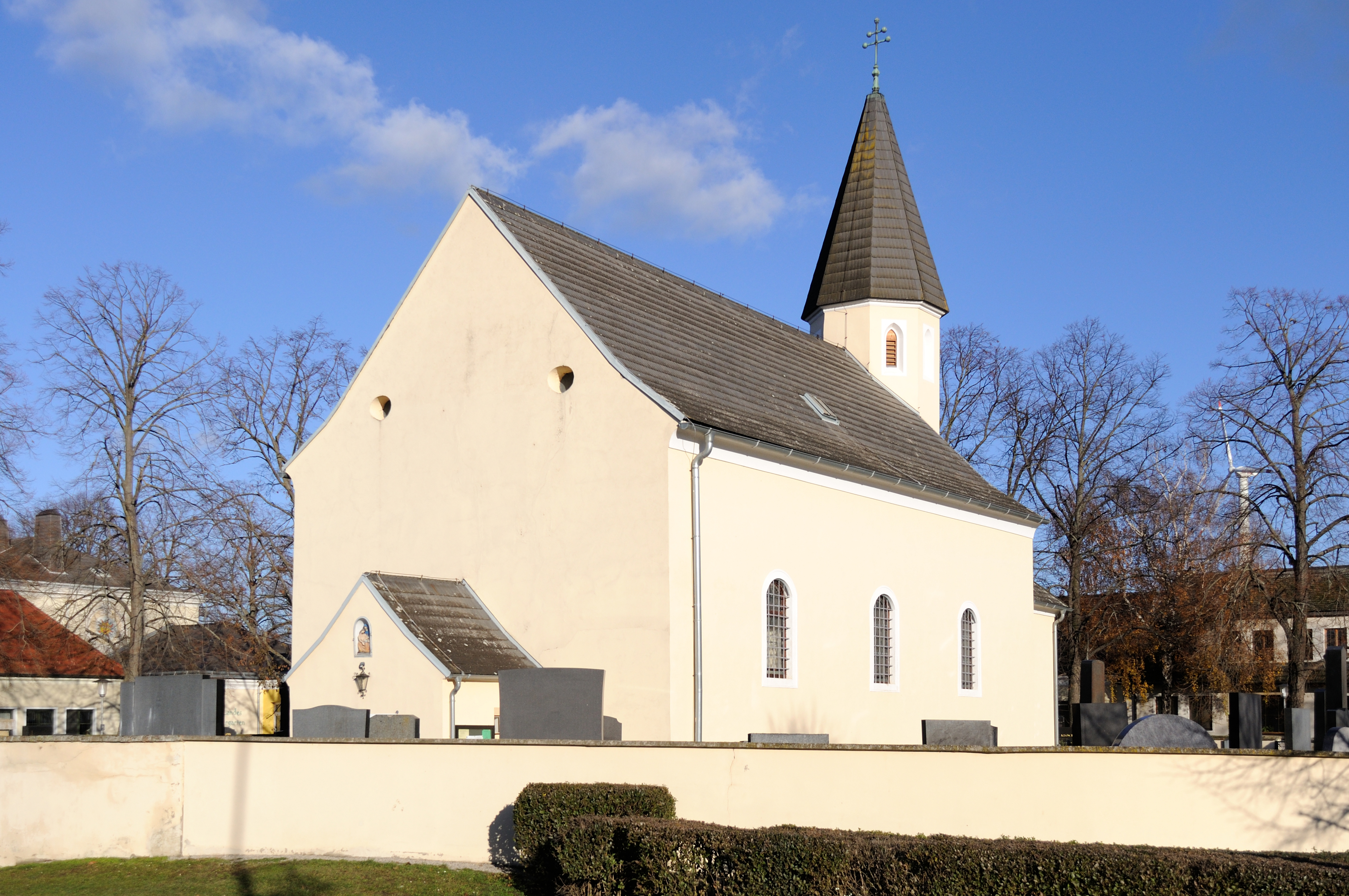
- Church in Glinzendorf

- Location within Austria
- Coordinates: 48°15′N 16°37′E
- Country: Austria
- State: Lower Austria
- District: Gänserndorf

Government
  - Mayor: Erich Iser

Area
  - Total: 10.43 km^{2} (4.03 sq mi)
- Elevation: 152 m (499 ft)

Population (2018-01-01)
  - Total: 295
  - Density: 28.3/km^{2} (73.3/sq mi)
- Time zone: UTC+1 (CET)
  - Summer (DST): UTC+2 (CEST)
- Postal code: 2262
- Area code: 02248

Glinzendorf is a town in the district of Gänserndorf in the Austrian state of Lower Austria.

== Geography ==
Glinzendorf lies 10 km east of Vienna. Only about 0.83 percent of the municipality is forested.
