= Spannberg =

- Municipality
- Location within Austria
- Coordinates: 48°27′N 16°43′E
- Country: Austria
- State: Lower Austria
- District: Gänserndorf

Government
  - Mayor: Herbert Stipanitz

Area
  - Total: 19.59 km^{2} (7.56 sq mi)
- Elevation: 186 m (610 ft)

Population (2018-01-01)
  - Total: 1,010
  - Density: 51.6/km^{2} (134/sq mi)
- Time zone: UTC+1 (CET)
  - Summer (DST): UTC+2 (CEST)
- Postal code: 2244
- Area code: 02538
- Website: www.spannberg

Spannberg is a town in the district of Gänserndorf in the Austrian state of Lower Austria.

== Geography ==
Spannberg lies in the Weinviertel in Lower Austria. About 20.51 percent of the municipality is forested.
