= Parbasdorf =

- Municipality
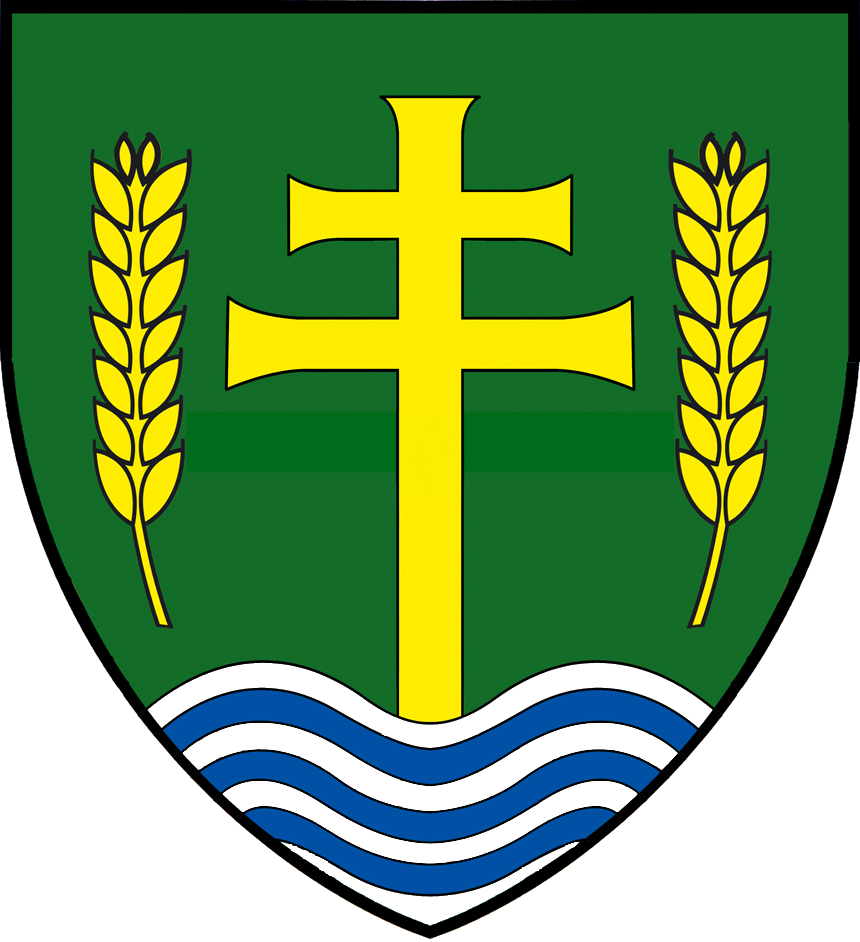
- Coat of arms

- Location within Austria
- Coordinates: 48°17′N 16°35′E
- Country: Austria
- State: Lower Austria
- District: Gänserndorf

Government
  - Mayor: Wilhelm Iser (ÖVP)

Area
  - Total: 10.23 km^{2} (3.95 sq mi)
- Elevation: 156 m (512 ft)

Population (2025-01-01)
  - Total: 177
  - Density: 17.3/km^{2} (44.8/sq mi)
- Time zone: UTC+1 (CET)
  - Summer (DST): UTC+2 (CEST)
- Postal code: 2232
- Area code: 02247

Parbasdorf is a town in the district of Gänserndorf in the Austrian state of Lower Austria.

== Geography ==
Parbasdorf lies in the Weinviertel in Lower Austria. Only about 1.74 percent of the municipality is forested.

== Geography ==
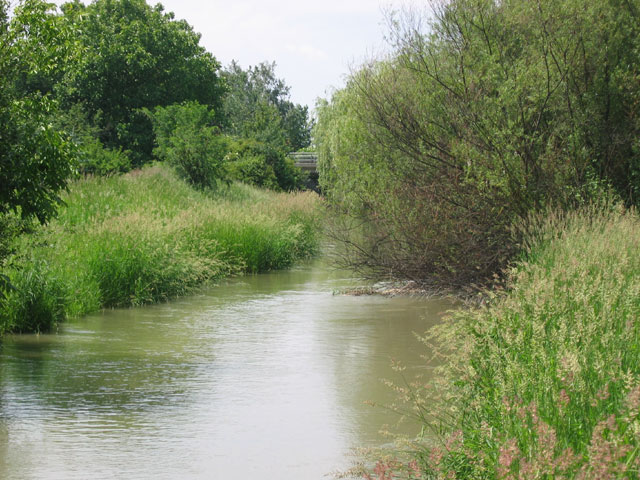
Russbach river

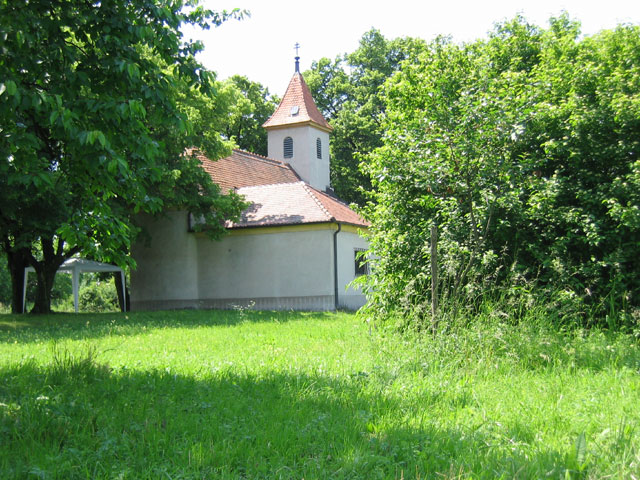
Church in Parbasdorf
