= Prottes =

- Municipality
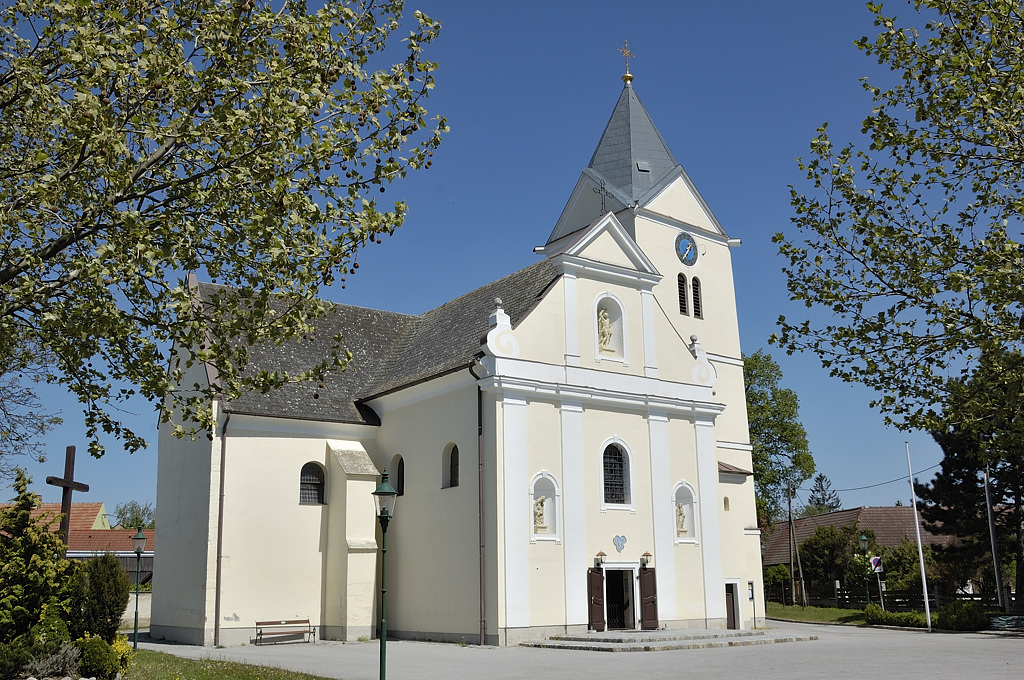
- Prottes parish church

- Coat of arms

- Location within Austria
- Coordinates: 48°23′N 16°44′E
- Country: Austria
- State: Lower Austria
- District: Gänserndorf

Government
  - Mayor: Christa Eichinger

Area
  - Total: 13.73 km^{2} (5.30 sq mi)
- Elevation: 162 m (531 ft)

Population (2023-01-01)
  - Total: 1,445
  - Density: 105.2/km^{2} (272.6/sq mi)
- 1,445
- Time zone: UTC+1 (CET)
  - Summer (DST): UTC+2 (CEST)
- Postal code: 2242
- Area code: 02282
- Website: www.prottes.at

Prottes is a town in the district of Gänserndorf in the Austrian state of Lower Austria.

== Geography ==
Prottes lies on the border of the Marchfeld and the Weinviertel in Lower Austria. About 7.52 percent of the municipality is forested.
