= Haringsee =

- Municipality
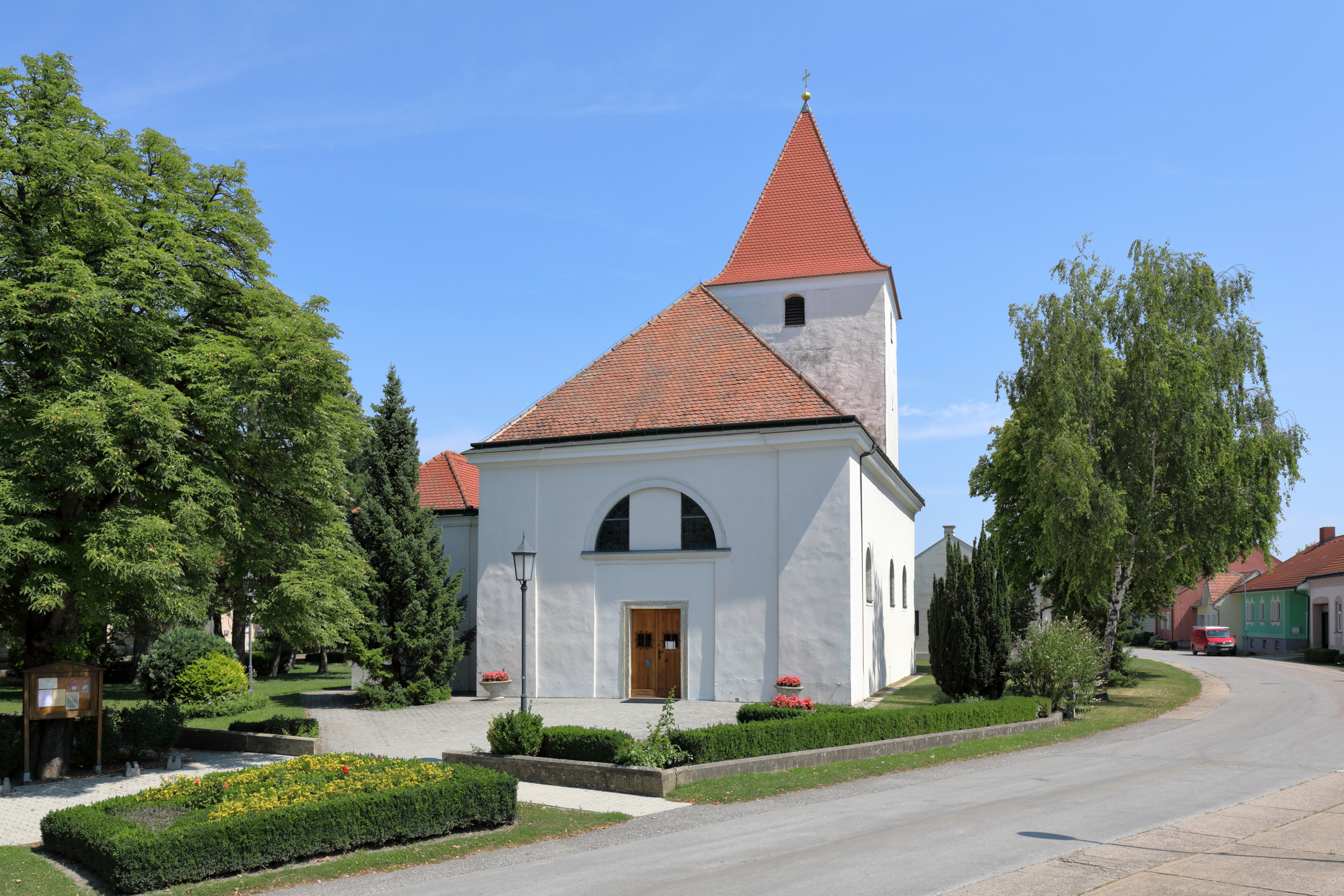
- Haringsee parish church

- Location within Austria
- Coordinates: 48°11′N 16°47′E
- Country: Austria
- State: Lower Austria
- District: Gänserndorf

Government
  - Mayor: Roman Sigmund

Area
  - Total: 27.11 km^{2} (10.47 sq mi)
- Elevation: 147 m (482 ft)

Population (2018-01-01)
  - Total: 1,179
  - Density: 43.49/km^{2} (112.6/sq mi)
- Time zone: UTC+1 (CET)
  - Summer (DST): UTC+2 (CEST)
- Postal code: 2286
- Area code: 02214
- Website: www.haringsee.at

Haringsee is a town in the district of Gänserndorf in the Austrian state of Lower Austria.

The town lies about 20 km east of Vienna, just north of the Danube and the Danube-Auen National Park. It is home to the Eulen- und Greifvogelstation Haringsee, a sanctuary for owls and birds of prey, including vultures.
