= Mannsdorf an der Donau =

- Municipality
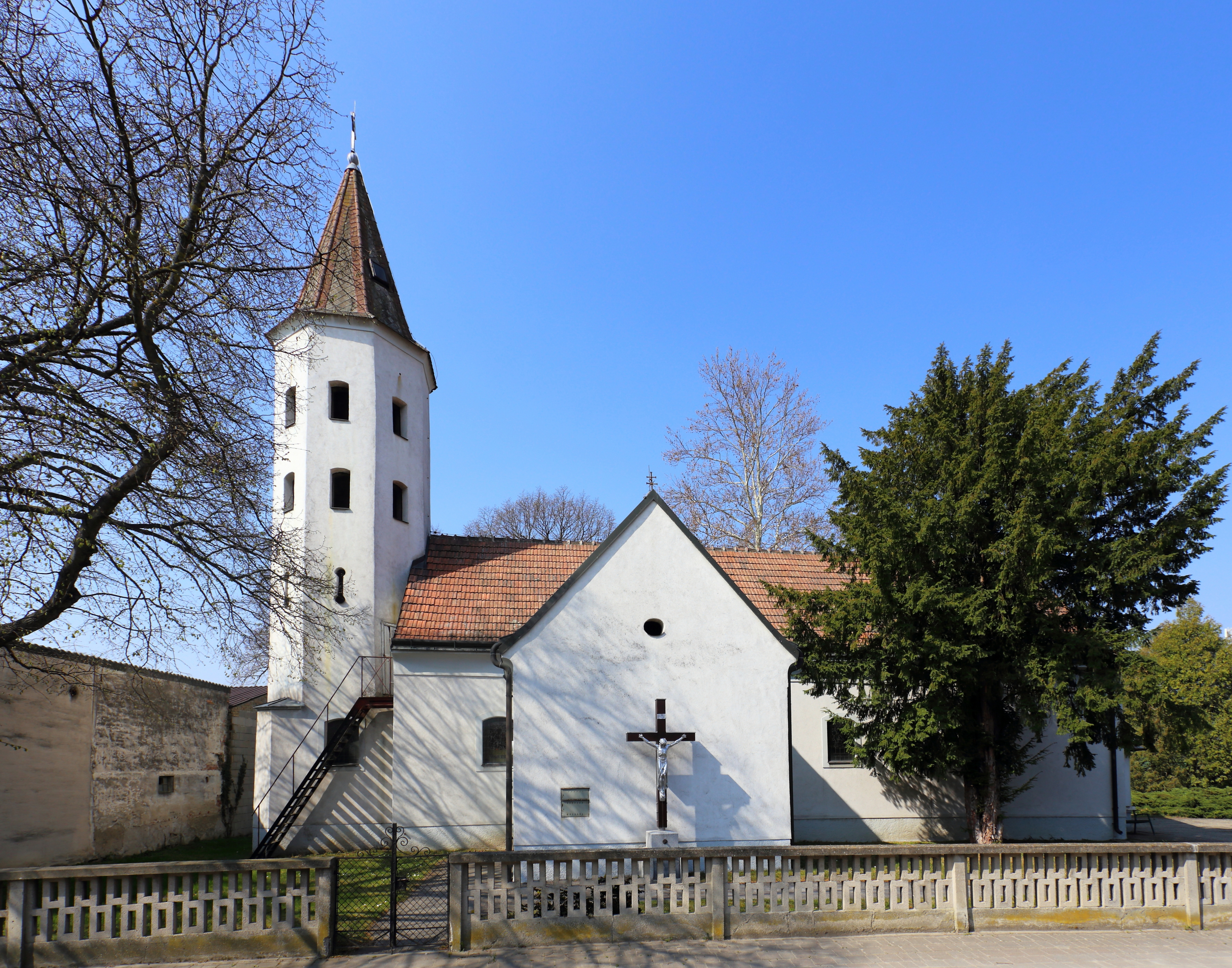
- Church in Mannsdorf an der Donau

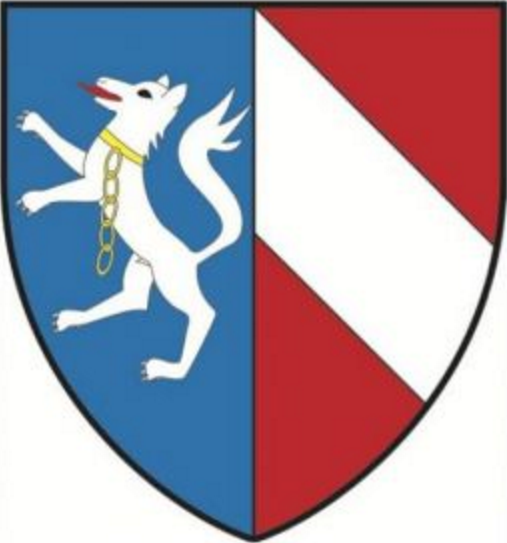
- Coat of arms

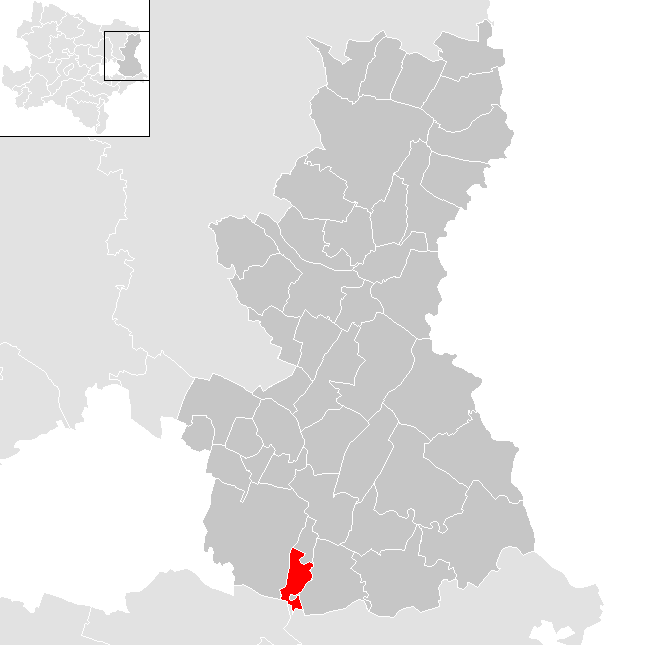
- Location within Gänserndorf district

- Location within Austria
- Coordinates: 48°9′N 16°36′E
- Country: Austria
- State: Lower Austria
- District: Gänserndorf

Government
  - Mayor: Christoph Windisch (ÖVP)

Area
  - Total: 10.31 km^{2} (3.98 sq mi)
- Elevation: 151 m (495 ft)

Population (2018-01-01)
  - Total: 342
  - Density: 33.2/km^{2} (85.9/sq mi)
- Time zone: UTC+1 (CET)
  - Summer (DST): UTC+2 (CEST)
- Postal code: 2304
- Area code: +43 2212
- Website: www.mannsdorf.at

Mannsdorf an der Donau is a town in the district of Gänserndorf in the Austrian state of Lower Austria.

== Geography ==
Mannsdorf an der Donau lies on the southern edge of the Marchfeld in the Weinviertel in Lower Austria. About 12 percent of the municipality is forested.
