= Barony of Ballyane =

Barony in County Wexford, Ireland

The Barony of Ballyane is a barony in County Wexford (Irish: Contae Loch Garman), Ireland. The territory was "surrendered and regranted" by the Clan Kavanagh in 1543.

== History ==
Diarmait Mac Murchada, King of Uí Cheinnsealaig and king of Leinster, held the lands of the Barony of Ballyane in 1167. His clan of MacMurrough-Kavanagh began to regain some of their former territories in the 14th century, especially in the north of the county, principally under Art MacMurrough Kavanagh. He extended their territories and exercised control over County Wexford (Irish: Contae Loch Garman) and over County Carlow (Irish: Contae Cheatharlach), in the province of Leinster. In pre-Norman times, Leinster was part of the Kingdom of Uí Cheinnsealaig, whose capital was at Ferns.

Gaelic chiefs were actively encouraged to surrender their lands to the king, and then have them regranted (returned) as freeholds paying a chief rent under a royal charter if they swore loyalty to him. Those who surrendered were also expected to speak English, wear English-style dress, remain loyal to the Crown, pay a rent and follow English laws and customs, In return they would be protected from attack and could organise local courts and enter the Parliament of Ireland. Surrender and Regrant was led by King Henry VIII (ruled 1509–47) in a bid to extend and secure his control over the island of Ireland. This policy started in the years between(1534–39) and the subsequent creation of the Kingdom of Ireland in 1541–42. Henry's problem was that many of the Irish clans remained autonomous and outside the control of his administration in Dublin. During the Tudor conquest of Ireland (c.1540-1603), surrender and regrant was the legal mechanism by which Irish clans were to be converted from a power structure rooted in clan and kin loyalties, to a late-feudal system under the English legal system. The policy was an attempt to involve the clan chiefs within the English polity, and to guarantee their property under English common law, as distinct from the traditional Irish Brehon law system.

Cahir Kavanagh made his submission in March 1538. He renounced the jurisdiction of the Pope, agreed to hold their lands from the king, and to abandon all claims to tribute or black rent from their neighbours of the Pale. In return for this he received a royal grant of his land and possessions, was created "Baron of Ballyane" and was promised a life peerage and a seat in the House of Lords.

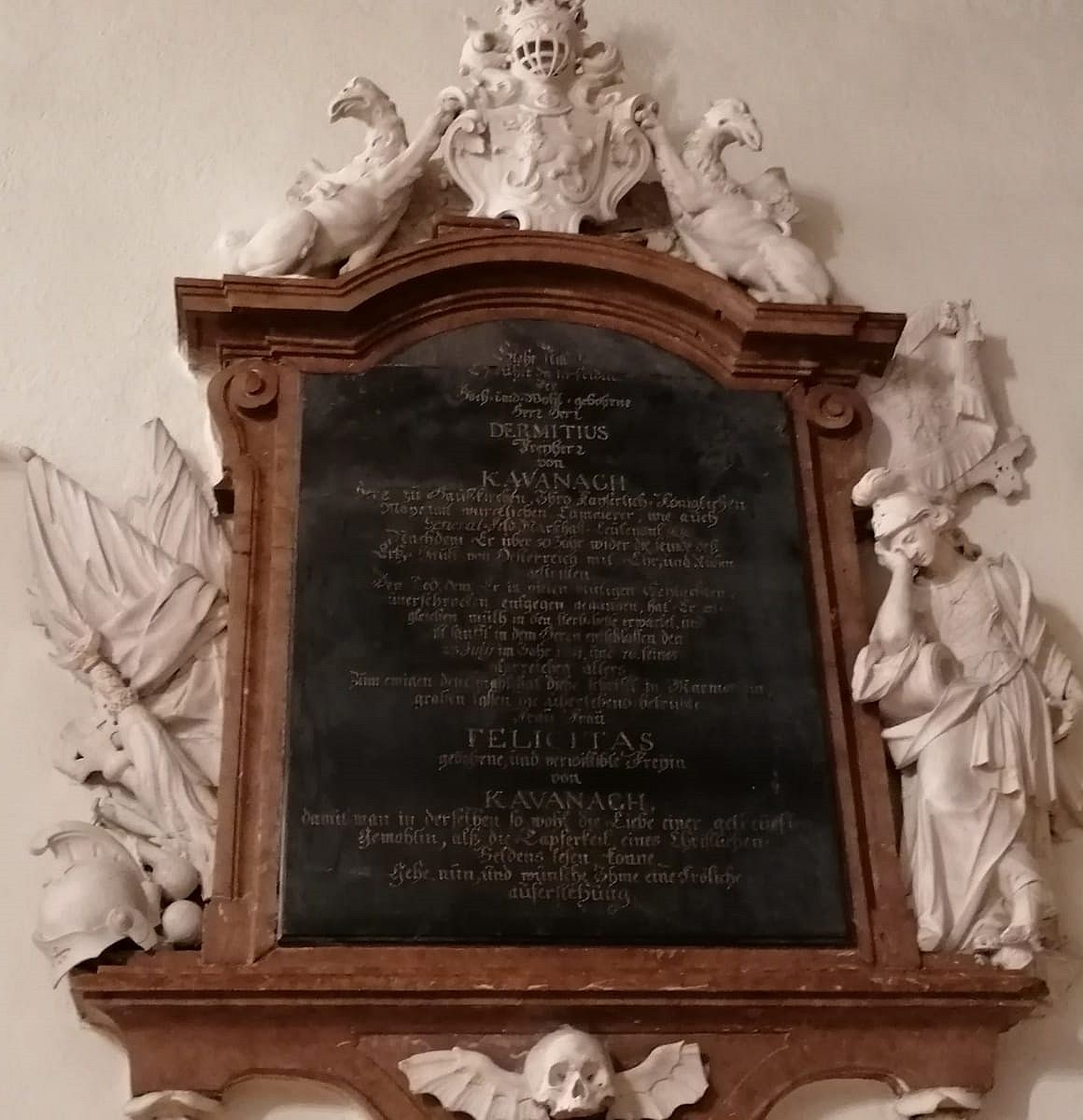
Wall tablet to Dermitius Freiherr von Kavanagh-Ballyane († 1739) at St Lawrence Church, Hauskirchen, Lower Austria. Part of the Irish military diaspora, he served in the Imperial Army and as imperial and royal Kämmerer, eventually rising to the rank of lieutenant field marshal.
