= Schönkirchen-Reyersdorf =

- Municipality
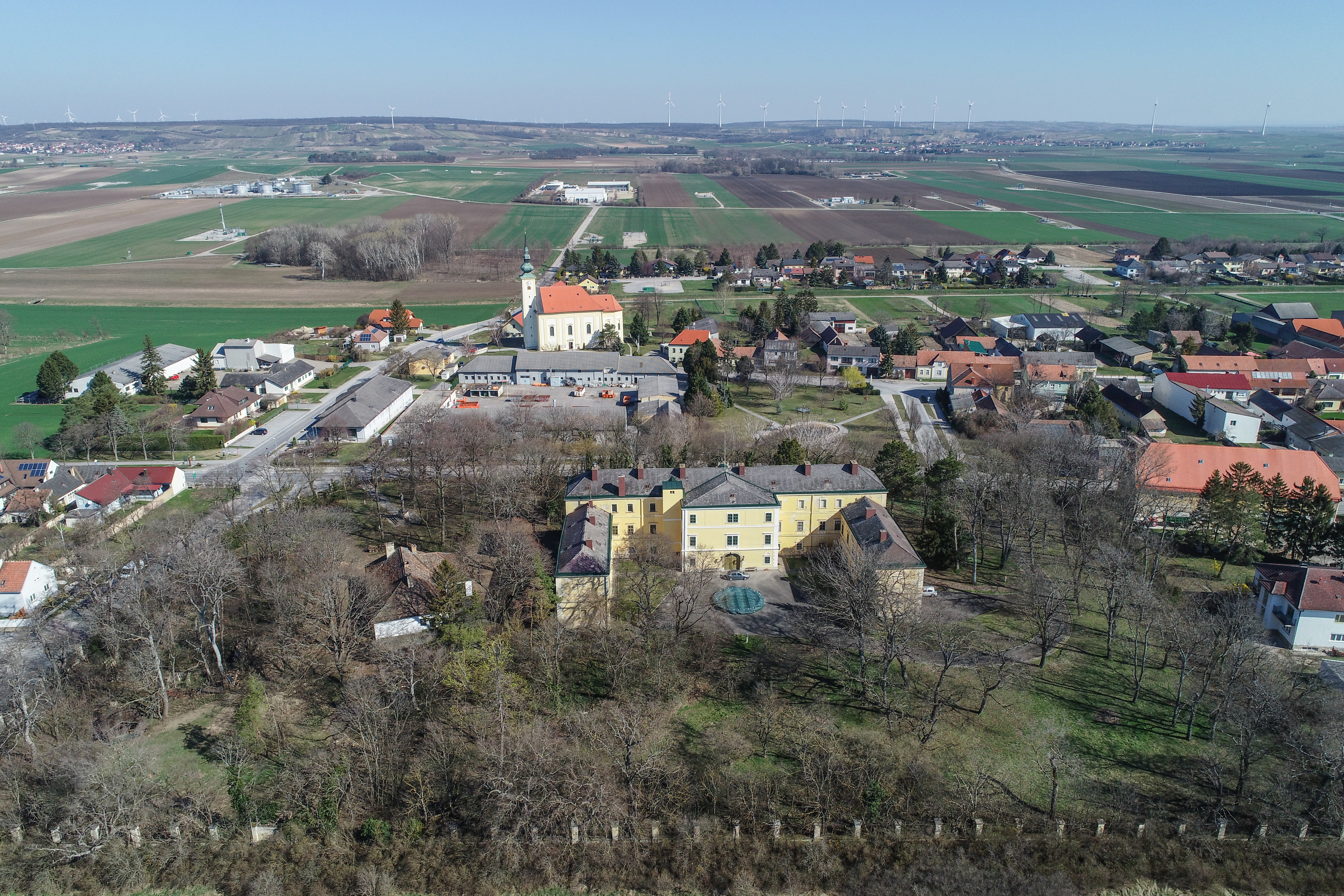
- Schoenkirchen aerial view

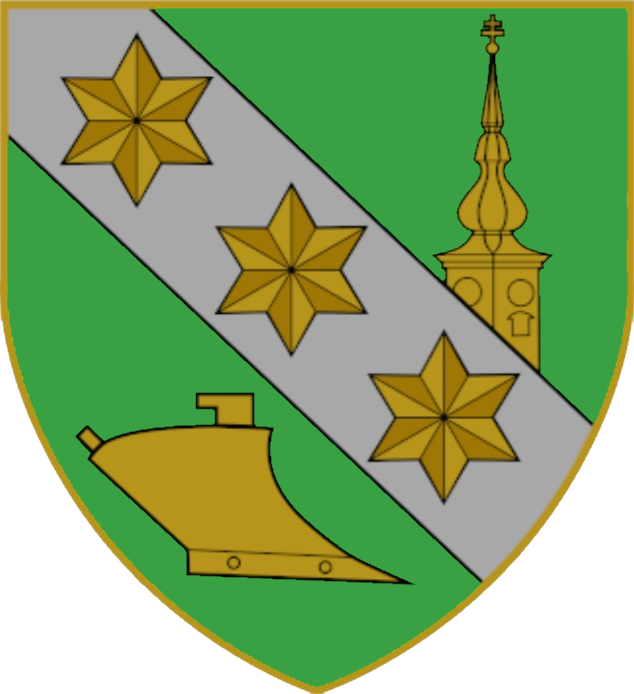
- Coat of arms

- Location within Austria
- Coordinates: 48°21′N 16°42′E
- Country: Austria
- State: Lower Austria
- District: Gänserndorf

Government
  - Mayor: Peter Hofinger

Area
  - Total: 17.89 km^{2} (6.91 sq mi)
- Elevation: 161 m (528 ft)

Population (2018-01-01)
  - Total: 1,963
  - Density: 109.7/km^{2} (284.2/sq mi)
- Time zone: UTC+1 (CET)
  - Summer (DST): UTC+2 (CEST)
- Postal code: 2241
- Area code: 02282
- Website: www.schoenkirchen-reyersdorf.at

Schönkirchen-Reyersdorf is a town in the district of Gänserndorf in the Austrian state of Lower Austria.

== Geography ==
Schönkirchen-Reyersdorf lies on the north edge of the Marchfeld in Lower Austria. Only about 2.31 percent of the municipality is forested.
