= Andlersdorf =

- Municipality
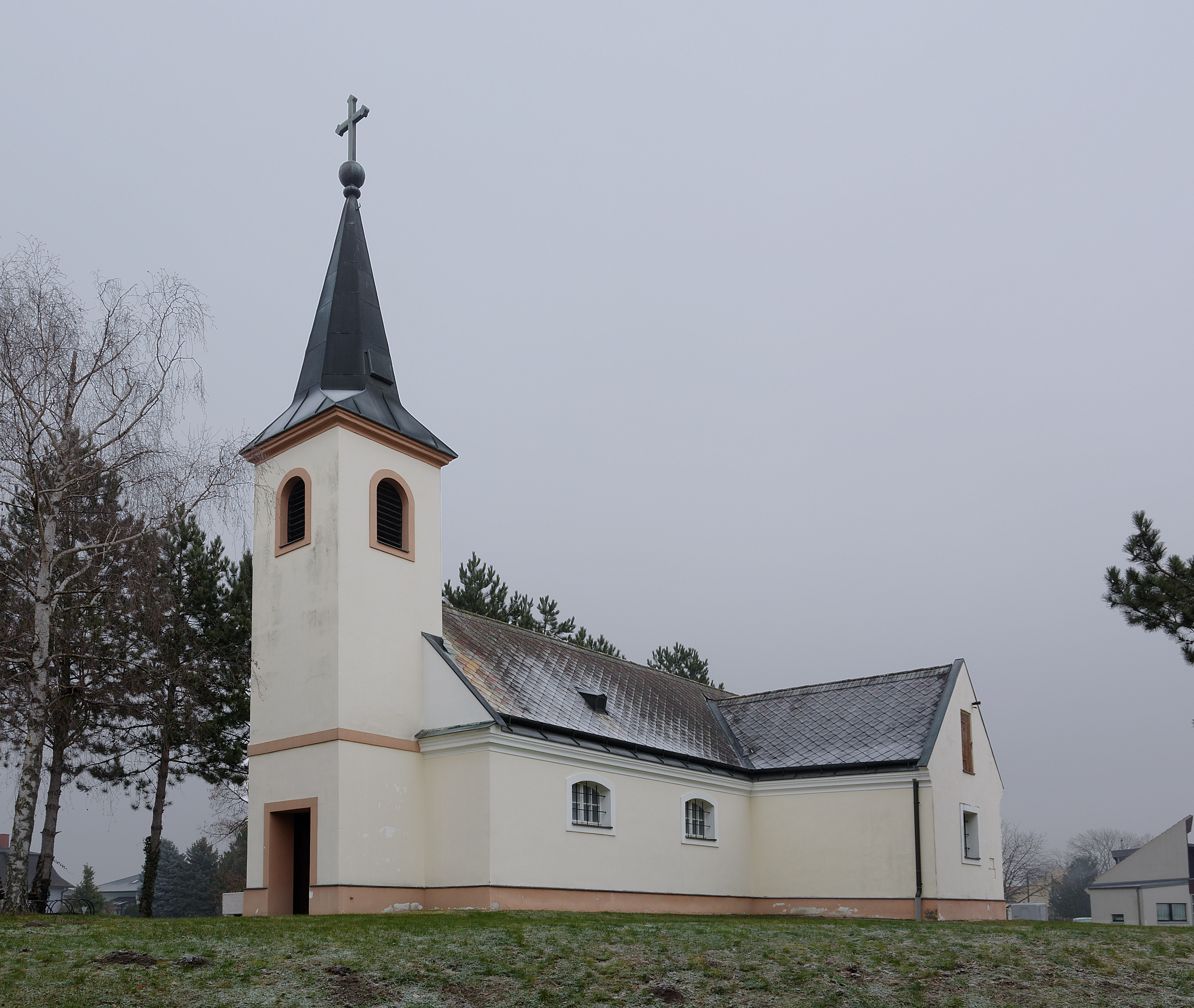
- Church in Andlersdorf

- Location within Austria
- Coordinates: 48°10′N 16°40′E
- Country: Austria
- State: Lower Austria
- District: Gänserndorf

Government
  - Mayor: Johann Greiner

Area
  - Total: 5.9 km^{2} (2.3 sq mi)
- Elevation: 118 m (387 ft)

Population (2018-01-01)
  - Total: 137
  - Density: 23/km^{2} (60/sq mi)
- Time zone: UTC+1 (CET)
  - Summer (DST): UTC+2 (CEST)
- Postal code: 2301
- Area code: 02215

Andlersdorf is a town in the district of Gänserndorf in Lower Austria in Austria.

== Geography ==
Andlersdorf lies in the south Marchfeld. About 3.55 percent of the municipality is forested.
