= Gänserndorf District =

Coordinates: 48.341°N 16.718°E

Gänserndorf District Bezirk Gänserndorf
- District
- Country: Austria
- State: Lower Austria
- Number of municipalities: 44
- Administrative seat: Gänserndorf

Government
  - District Governor: Claudia Pfeiler-Blach

Area
  - Total: 1,272 km^{2} (491 sq mi)

Population (2016)
  - Total: 99,738
  - Density: 78.41/km^{2} (203.1/sq mi)
- Time zone: UTC+01:00 (CET)
  - Summer (DST): UTC+02:00 (CEST)
- Telephone prefix: 2247
- Vehicle registration: GF
- NUTS code: AT125

Bezirk Gänserndorf (German pronunciation: [ˈɡɛnzɐnˌdɔʁf]) is a district of the state of Lower Austria in Austria. The Marchfeld lies in it.

== Municipalities ==
Municipalities of Gänserndorf District

Towns (Städte) are indicated in boldface; market towns (Marktgemeinden) in italics; suburbs, hamlets and other subdivisions of a municipality are indicated in small characters.

- Aderklaa
- Andlersdorf
- Angern an der March
  - Angern an der March, Grub an der March, Mannersdorf an der March, Ollersdorf, Stillfried
- Auersthal
- Bad Pirawarth
  - Bad Pirawarth, Kollnbrunn
- **Deutsch-Wagram**
- Drösing
  - Drösing, Waltersdorf an der March
- Dürnkrut
  - Dürnkrut, Waidendorf
- Ebenthal
- Eckartsau
  - Eckartsau, Kopfstetten, Pframa, Wagram an der Donau, Witzelsdorf
- Engelhartstetten
  - Engelhartstetten, Groißenbrunn, Loimersdorf, Markthof, Schloßhof, Stopfenreuth
- **Gänserndorf**
- Glinzendorf
- **Groß-Enzersdorf**
  - Franzensdorf, Groß-Enzersdorf, Matzneusiedl, Mühlleiten, Oberhausen, Probstdorf, Rutzendorf, Schönau an der Donau, Wittau
- Groß-Schweinbarth
- Großhofen
- Haringsee
  - Fuchsenbigl, Haringsee, Straudorf
- Hauskirchen
  - Hauskirchen, Prinzendorf an der Zaya, Rannersdorf an der Zaya
- Hohenau an der March
- Hohenruppersdorf
- Jedenspeigen
  - Jedenspeigen, Sierndorf an der March
- Lassee
  - Lassee, Schönfeld im Marchfeld
- Leopoldsdorf im Marchfelde
  - Breitstetten, Leopoldsdorf im Marchfelde
- Mannsdorf an der Donau
- **Marchegg**
  - Breitensee, Marchegg
- Markgrafneusiedl
- Matzen-Raggendorf
  - Klein-Harras, Matzen, Raggendorf
- Neusiedl an der Zaya
  - Neusiedl an der Zaya, St. Ulrich
- Obersiebenbrunn
- Orth an der Donau
- Palterndorf-Dobermannsdorf
  - Dobermannsdorf, Palterndorf
- Parbasdorf
- Prottes
- Raasdorf
  - Pysdorf, Raasdorf
- Ringelsdorf-Niederabsdorf
  - Niederabsdorf, Ringelsdorf
- Schönkirchen-Reyersdorf
  - Reyersdorf, Schönkirchen
- Spannberg
- Strasshof an der Nordbahn
- Sulz im Weinviertel
  - Erdpreß, Nexing, Niedersulz, Obersulz
- Untersiebenbrunn
- Velm-Götzendorf
  - Götzendorf, Velm
- Weiden an der March
  - Baumgarten an der March, Oberweiden, Zwerndorf
- Weikendorf
  - Dörfles, Stripfing, Tallesbrunn, Weikendorf
- **Zistersdorf**
  - Blumenthal, Eichhorn, Gaiselberg, Gösting, Großinzersdorf, Loidesthal, Maustrenk, Windisch, Baumgarten, Zistersdorf
