= Velm-Götzendorf =

- Municipality
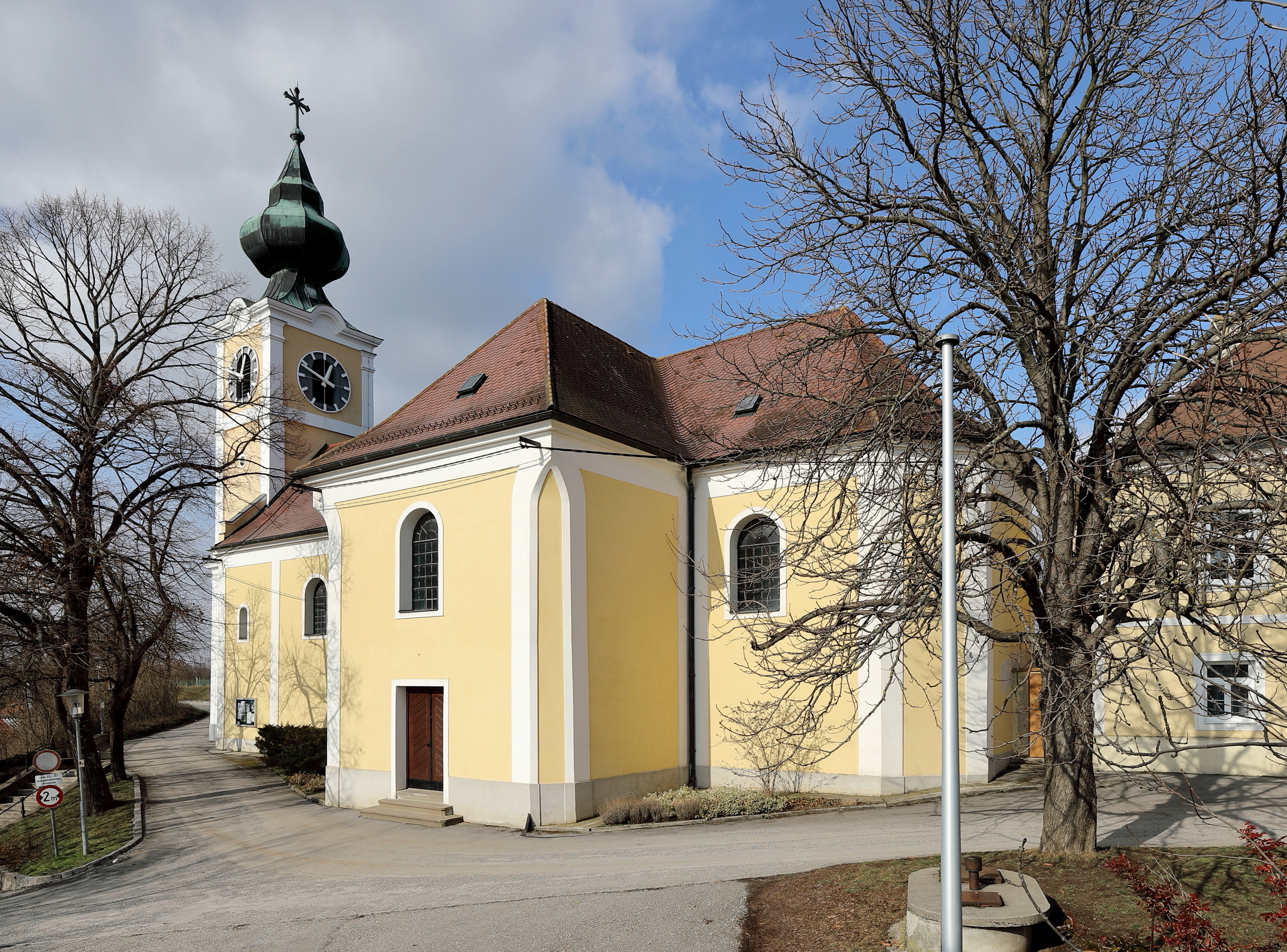
- Götzendorf parish church

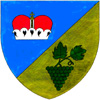
- Coat of arms

- Location within Austria
- Coordinates: 48°28′N 16°47′E
- Country: Austria
- State: Lower Austria
- District: Gänserndorf

Government
  - Mayor: Gerald Haasmüller

Area
  - Total: 17.74 km^{2} (6.85 sq mi)
- Elevation: 183 m (600 ft)

Population (2018-01-01)
  - Total: 735
  - Density: 41.4/km^{2} (107/sq mi)
- Time zone: UTC+1 (CET)
  - Summer (DST): UTC+2 (CEST)
- Postal code: 2245
- Area code: 02538
- Vehicle registration: GF
- Website: www.velm-goetzendorf.at

Velm-Götzendorf is a town in the district of Gänserndorf in the Austrian state of Lower Austria.

== Geography ==
Velm-Götzendorf lies in the Weinviertel in Lower Austria. Only about 2.95 percent of the municipality is forested.

=== Sub-divisions ===
- Velm
- Götzendorf
