= Angern an der March =

- Municipality
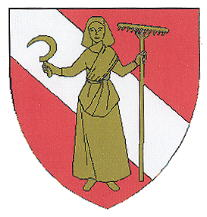
- Coat of arms

- Location within Austria
- Coordinates: 48°23′N 16°50′E
- Country: Austria
- State: Lower Austria
- District: Gänserndorf

Government
  - Mayor: Robert Meißl (SPÖ)

Area
  - Total: 38.17 km^{2} (14.74 sq mi)
- Elevation: 154 m (505 ft)

Population (2018-01-01)
  - Total: 3,384
  - Density: 88.66/km^{2} (229.6/sq mi)
- Time zone: UTC+1 (CET)
  - Summer (DST): UTC+2 (CEST)
- Postal code: 2301
- Area code: 02215
- Website: www.angern.at

Angern an der March (Slovak: Congr) is a market town in the district of Gänserndorf in the Austrian state of Lower Austria. The municipality consists of the Katastralgemeinden Angern, Grub, Mannersdorf, Ollersdorf and Stillfried.

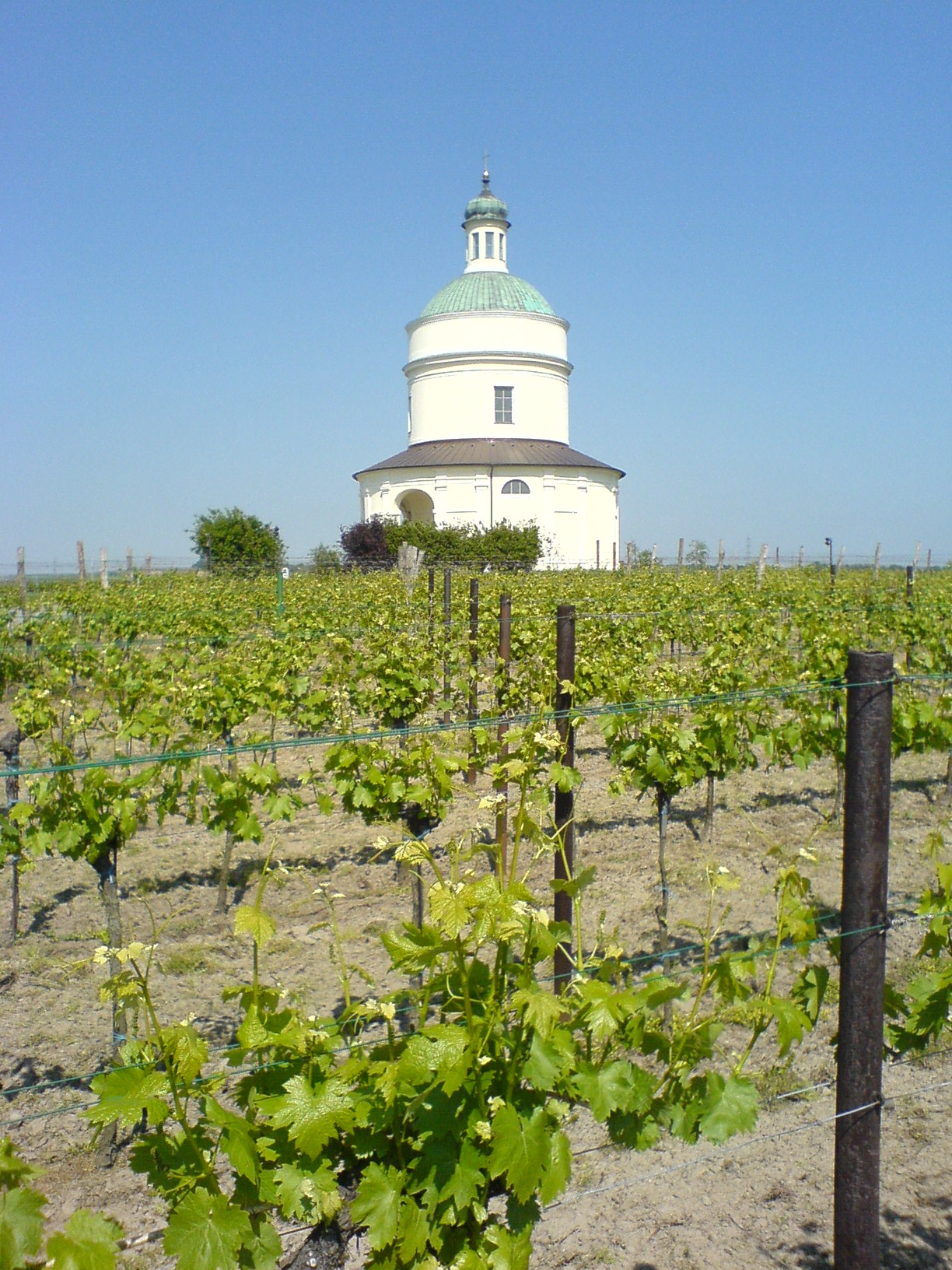
St Roch Chapel

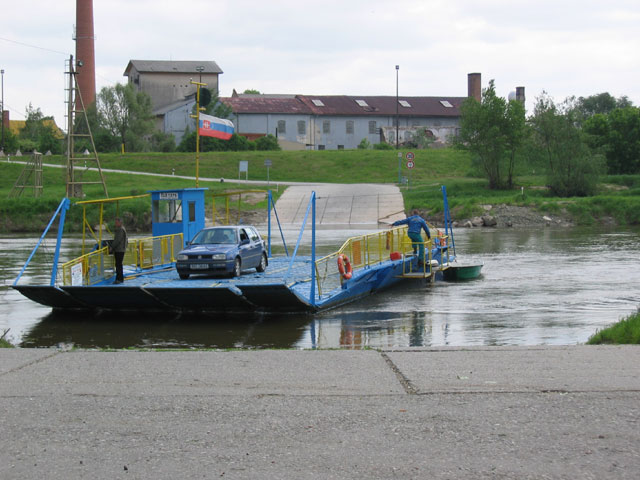
Ferry cross the Morava

Angern is situated in the Weinviertel region, within the northern Marchfeld basin of the Morava (German: March) river, about 40 kilometers (25 mi) northeast of Vienna. The river forms the border with the village of Záhorská Ves in Slovakia, it is crossed by a small car ferry while plans for rebuilding a former bridge are currently under discussion.

The settlement of Anger in the Duchy of Austria was first mentioned in 1260 deed and already referred to as a market town in 1495, a title that it again received in 1970. The Baroque St Roch Chapel at Mannersdorf was built in 1635. Anger Castle was finally demolished in World War II.

The area is the site of several vineyards.

== Subdivisions ==
- Angern
- Grub
- Mannersdorf
- Ollersdorf
- Stillfried (de)

== Transportation ==
Angern has access to the Northern Railway (Nordbahn) line from Vienna to Brno. It also lies at the junction of the Bundesstraße B8 Angerner Straße highway from Vienna with the B49 Bernstein Straße, part of the ancient Amber route.
