= Bad Pirawarth =

- Municipality
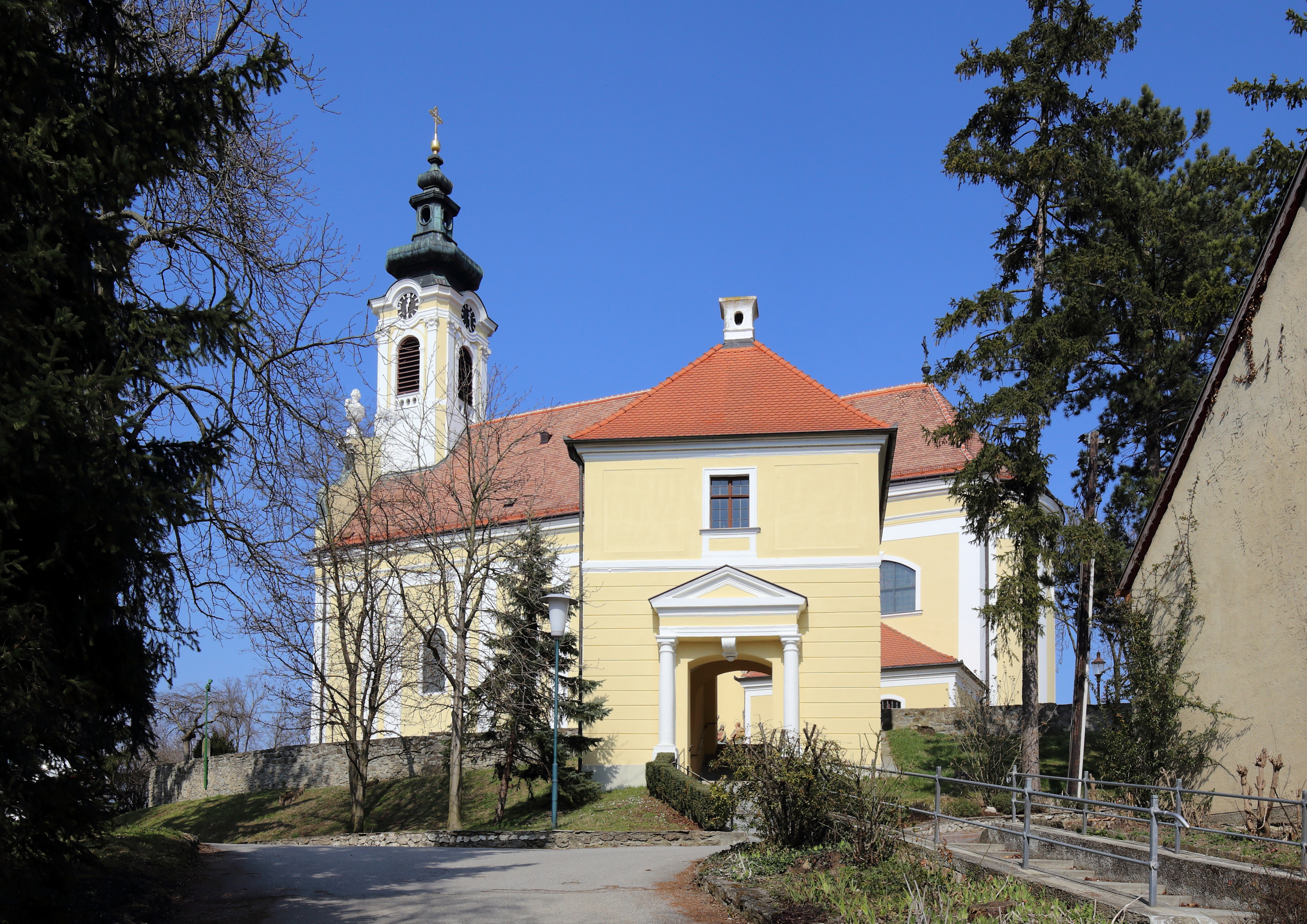
- Parish church

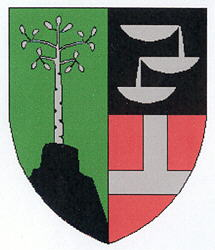
- Coat of arms

- Location within Austria
- Coordinates: 48°27′N 16°36′E
- Country: Austria
- State: Lower Austria
- District: Gänserndorf

Government
  - Mayor: Kurt Jantschitsch (ÖVP)

Area
  - Total: 25.44 km^{2} (9.82 sq mi)
- Elevation: 177 m (581 ft)

Population (2018-01-01)
  - Total: 1,671
  - Density: 65.68/km^{2} (170.1/sq mi)
- Time zone: UTC+1 (CET)
  - Summer (DST): UTC+2 (CEST)
- Postal code: 2222
- Area code: 02574
- Website: www.badpirawarth.at

Bad Pirawarth is a town in the district of Gänserndorf in Lower Austria in Austria.

== Geography ==
Bad Pirawarth lies near Vienna in Lower Austria in the valley of the Weidenbach, which flows into the Morava River. It is 18 km from Gänserndorf. About 17 percent of the municipality is forested.

=== Subdivisions ===
- Bad Pirawarth
- Kollnbrunn

== People ==
- Gerhard Ringel, born at Kollnbrunn
