= Jedenspeigen =

- Municipality
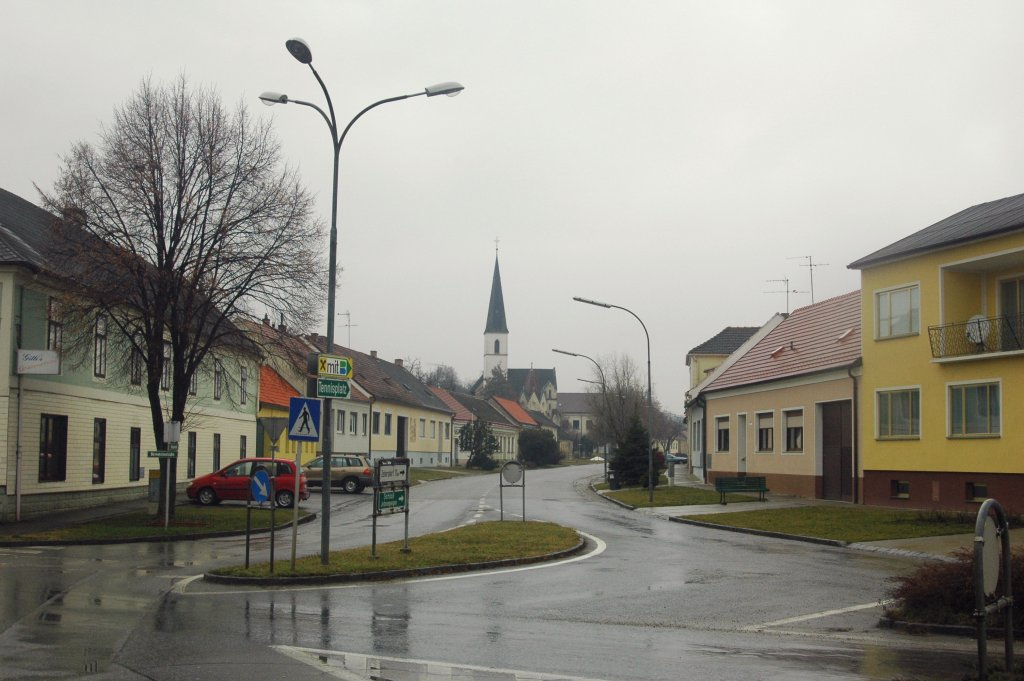

- Coat of arms

- Location within Austria
- Coordinates: 48°30′N 16°52′E
- Country: Austria
- State: Lower Austria
- District: Gänserndorf

Government
  - Mayor: Reinhard Kridlo

Area
  - Total: 23.22 km^{2} (8.97 sq mi)
- Elevation: 158 m (518 ft)

Population (2018-01-01)
  - Total: 1,064
  - Density: 45.82/km^{2} (118.7/sq mi)
- Time zone: UTC+1 (CET)
  - Summer (DST): UTC+2 (CEST)
- Postal code: 2264
- Area code: 02536
- Website: www.jedenspeigen.at

Jedenspeigen is a town in the district of Gänserndorf in the Austrian state of Lower Austria.

== Geography ==
Jedenspeigen lies in the Weinviertel in Lower Austria. Only about 8.07 percent of the municipality is forested.

== History ==
The Battle on the Marchfeld took place near here in 1278, between a coalition of Habsburg and Hungarian forces against the Bohemian king Ottokar II.
