= Hohenau an der March =

- Municipality
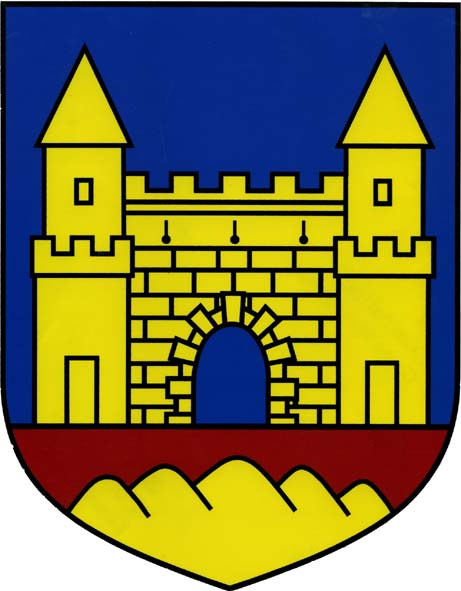
- Coat of arms

- Location within Austria Location within Lower Austria
- Coordinates: 48°36′N 16°54′E
- Country: Austria
- State: Lower Austria
- District: Gänserndorf

Government
  - Mayor: Wolfgang Gaida (SPÖ)

Area
  - Total: 23.41 km^{2} (9.04 sq mi)
- Elevation: 155 m (509 ft)

Population (2018-01-01)
  - Total: 2,738
  - Density: 117.0/km^{2} (302.9/sq mi)
- Time zone: UTC+1 (CET)
  - Summer (DST): UTC+2 (CEST)
- Postal code: 2273
- Area code: 02535
- Website: www.hohenau-march.at

Hohenau an der March (Czech: Cáhnov, Slovak: Cahnov) is a town in the district of Gänserndorf in the Austrian state of Lower Austria, close to Vienna and the borders with the Czech Republic and Slovakia.

== Geography ==
The town lies on the river Morava (March in German). It lies in the Weinviertel in Lower Austria. Only about 6.18 percent of the municipality is forested.

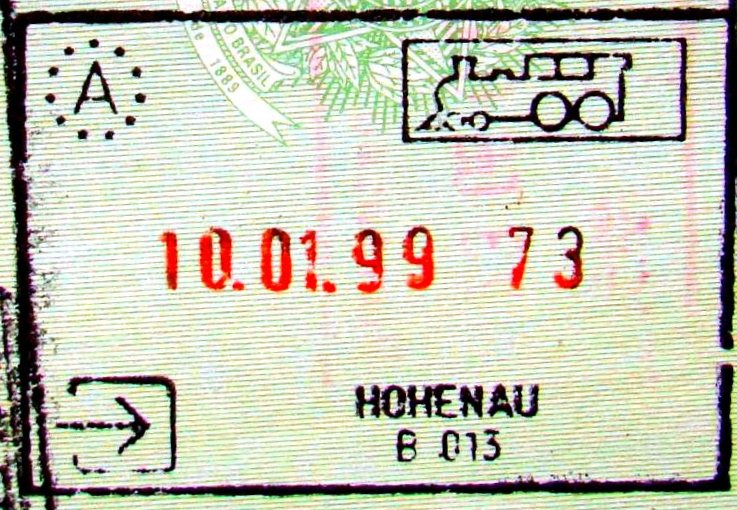
Passport stamp from the Austrian-Czech railway border before the Czech Republic joined the European Union.

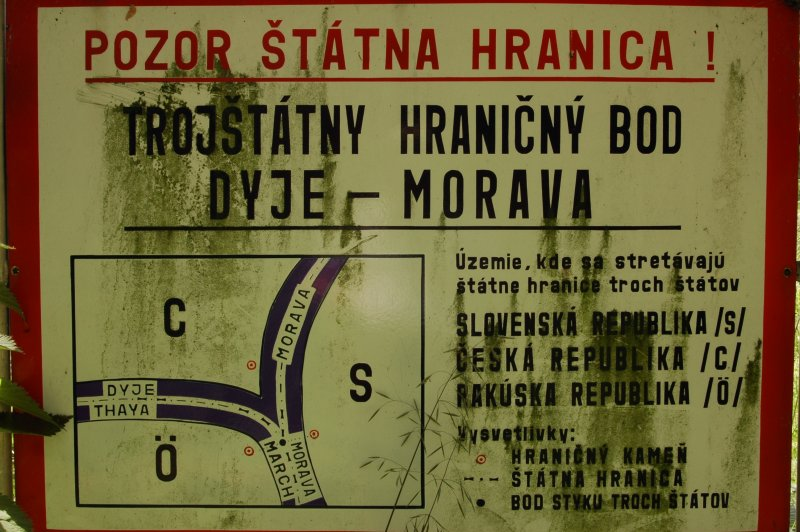
Dyje-Morava confluence 02

== Climate ==
Climate data for Hohenau an der March 1981-2010
Month	Jan	Feb	Mar	Apr	May	Jun	Jul	Aug	Sep	Oct	Nov	Dec	Year
Record high °C (°F)	18.3 (64.9)	19.3 (66.7)	24.6 (76.3)	27.9 (82.2)	32.6 (90.7)	35.6 (96.1)	37.3 (99.1)	38.8 (101.8)	32.7 (90.9)	28.4 (83.1)	21.5 (70.7)	16.4 (61.5)	38.8 (101.8)
Mean daily maximum °C (°F)	2.4 (36.3)	4.8 (40.6)	10.1 (50.2)	16.4 (61.5)	21.1 (70.0)	24.1 (75.4)	27 (81)	26.5 (79.7)	21.2 (70.2)	15.3 (59.5)	8.1 (46.6)	3.1 (37.6)	15 (59)
Daily mean °C (°F)	−1.4 (29.5)	0 (32)	4.3 (39.7)	9.8 (49.6)	14.8 (58.6)	17.8 (64.0)	20.1 (68.2)	19.5 (67.1)	14.6 (58.3)	9.2 (48.6)	4.1 (39.4)	−0.2 (31.6)	9.4 (48.9)
Mean daily minimum °C (°F)	−4.5 (23.9)	−3.6 (25.5)	0.3 (32.5)	3.9 (39.0)	8.5 (47.3)	11.4 (52.5)	13.3 (55.9)	13.3 (55.9)	9.6 (49.3)	5.1 (41.2)	1.1 (34.0)	−2.9 (26.8)	4.6 (40.3)
Record low °C (°F)	−29.3 (−20.7)	−24 (−11)	−16.3 (2.7)	−6.5 (20.3)	−2.3 (27.9)	1.6 (34.9)	4.3 (39.7)	4.4 (39.9)	−0.6 (30.9)	−8.9 (16.0)	−17.3 (0.9)	−23.5 (−10.3)	−29.3 (−20.7)
Average precipitation mm (inches)	25 (1.0)	24 (0.9)	30 (1.2)	28 (1.1)	52 (2.0)	54 (2.1)	59 (2.3)	50 (2.0)	48 (1.9)	27 (1.1)	35 (1.4)	32 (1.3)	463 (18.2)
Average relative humidity (%) (at 14:00)	75.3	66	56.7	46.5	49.2	49.8	45.5	47	52.4	58.3	71.8	78.4	58.1
Source: Central Institute for Meteorology and Geodynamics
