= Gänserndorf =

- Municipality
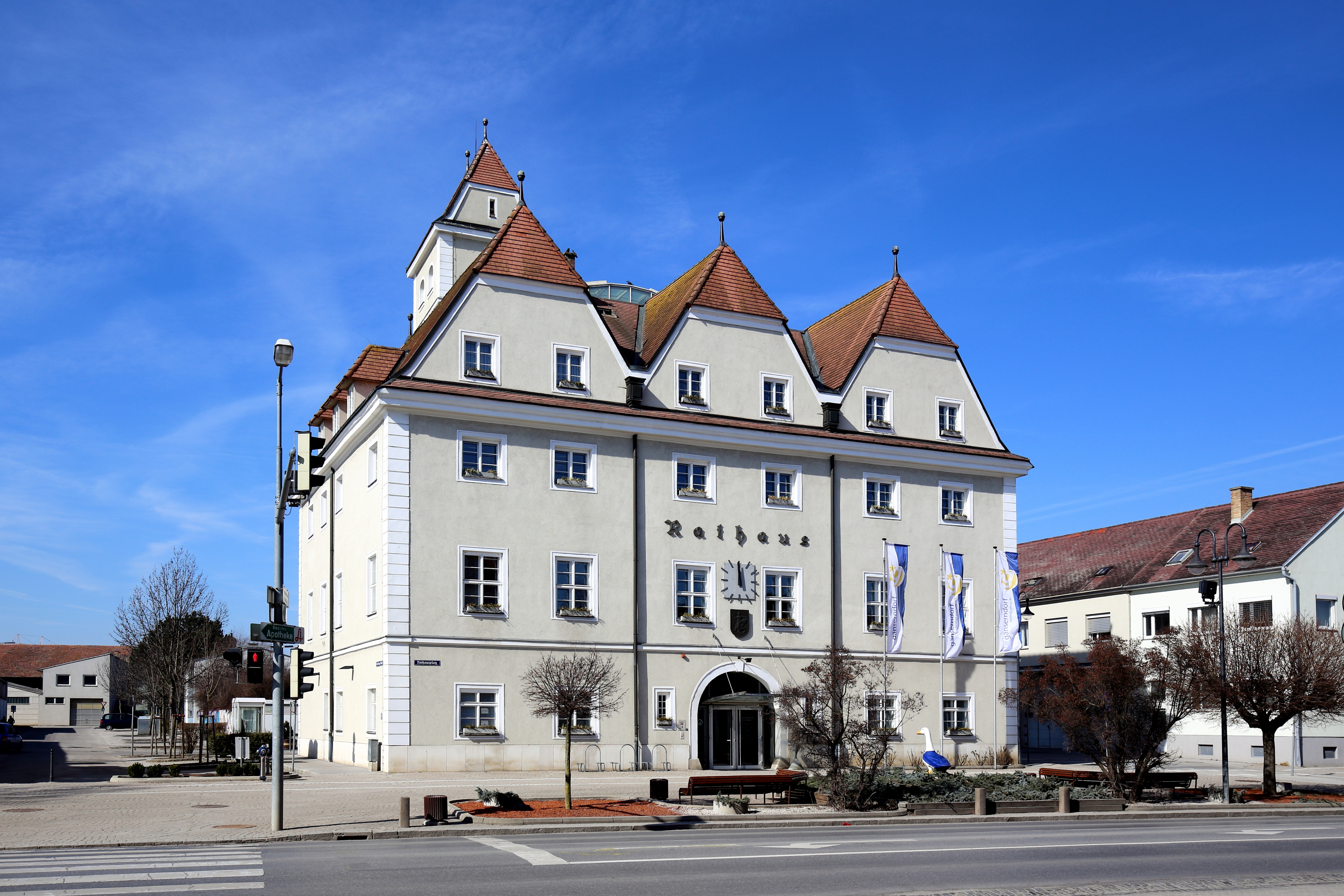
- Town hall

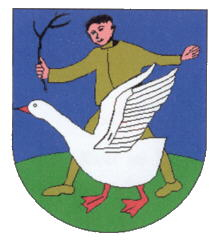
- Coat of arms

- Location within Austria
- Coordinates: 48°20′26″N 16°43′03″E
- Country: Austria
- State: Lower Austria
- District: Gänserndorf

Government
  - Mayor: René Lobner (ÖVP)

Area
  - Total: 30.56 km^{2} (11.80 sq mi)
- Elevation: 167 m (548 ft)

Population (2018-01-01)
  - Total: 11,404
  - Density: 373.2/km^{2} (966.5/sq mi)
- Time zone: UTC+1 (CET)
  - Summer (DST): UTC+2 (CEST)
- Postal code: 2230
- Area code: 02282
- Vehicle registration: GF
- Website: www.gaenserndorf.at

Gänserndorf (German pronunciation: [ˈɡɛnzɐnˌdɔʁf]) is a town on the Marchfeld in the state of Lower Austria, Austria and is the capital of Gänserndorf district. It lies about 20 km northeast of Vienna, to which it is connected by both the Angerner Straße (Bundesstraße, or federal highway, 8) and the North railway line.

== Landscape Park ==
Landscape Park in Gänserndorf covers an area of approximately 70,000 square metres (17 acres) and is heavily used as a recreational area. The park offers pedestrian pathways as well as many bike paths along a willow-tree lined creek.

== Town hall ==
With the town hall historically rebuilt in 1925 Gänserndorf is protected as a historic monument and presents itself with 24 decorated windows during Christmas time.

== Summer events ==
Gänserndorf is well known for its summer events including art gallery openings, book readings and concerts, live music programs and many other festivals. The city and county of Gänserndorf host many activities in the warm months that are always well attended.
