= Zistersdorf =

- Municipality
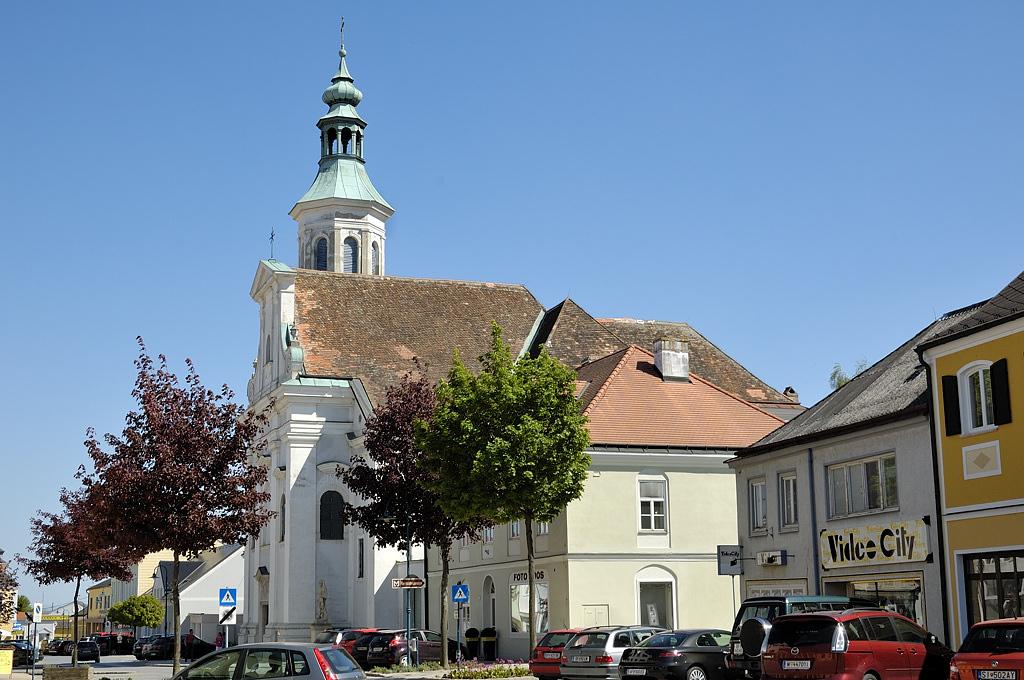
- Church of the Exaltation of the Holy Cross

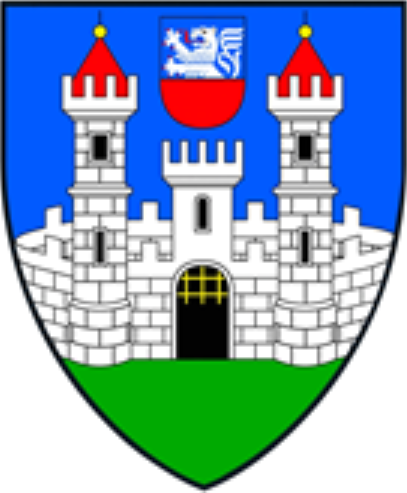
- Coat of arms

- Location within Austria
- Coordinates: 48°31′N 16°45′E
- Country: Austria
- State: Lower Austria
- District: Gänserndorf

Government
  - Mayor: Helmut Doschek (ÖVP)

Area
  - Total: 88.69 km^{2} (34.24 sq mi)
- Elevation: 199 m (653 ft)

Population (2018-01-01)
  - Total: 5,391
  - Density: 60.78/km^{2} (157.4/sq mi)
- Time zone: UTC+1 (CET)
  - Summer (DST): UTC+2 (CEST)
- Postal code: 2225
- Area code: +43 2532
- Website: www.zistersdorf.at

Zistersdorf is a town in the district of Gänserndorf in the Austrian state of Lower Austria.

The town became renowned for oil discoveries when crude oil was first extracted in August 1930, though initial production was too low for commercial use. By 1934, the Gösting 2 well significantly boosted output to 30 tons daily, critically supporting the Wehrmacht during WWII. Allied bombings on June 16 and 26, 1944, targeted these facilities, causing severe fuel shortages. As the last functioning oil fields of the Third Reich were in Zistersdorf, it was a key objective for the Red Army, which crossed the Morava River and overran the heavily defended area by the Wehrmacht and Waffen-SS in April 1945.

The RAG, the company that has operated in the area, has produced over 6,660,000 tonnes of crude oil from the Zistersdorf reserves. Modern and sustainable production methods were introduced early on, including eco-friendly extraction processes emphasized during a 2011 visit by OPEC's Secretary General, who praised the area for its integration of productive and sustainable practices within Austria's oldest wine-growing regions. The Gaiselberg field has been particularly productive, with its Gaiselberg 1 well, among the world's oldest active oil wells, yielding significant quantities of oil and gas since 1938. This site alone has produced over 126,000 tonnes of oil, with current operations generating about 97 tonnes of saltwater daily, which is treated and reinjected to maintain reservoir pressure. The integration of advanced drilling technologies and environmental stewardship has been central to the region's longevity and productivity in oil production.

Today, the fields, operated by ADX Energy, produce approximately 26.5 tons of oil equivalent per day.

== Population ==
Historical population
Year	Pop.	±%
1869	5,917	—
1880	6,410	+8.3%
1890	6,721	+4.9%
1900	6,787	+1.0%
1910	7,183	+5.8%
1923	6,656	−7.3%
1934	6,667	+0.2%
1939	7,041	+5.6%
1951	7,448	+5.8%
1961	6,776	−9.0%
1971	6,421	−5.2%
1981	5,792	−9.8%
1991	5,524	−4.6%
2001	5,624	+1.8%
2011	5,468	−2.8%

== Notable people ==
- Franz Ignaz von Holbein (1779–1855), an Austrian playwright and theatre director.
- Johann Petzmayer (1803–1884), an Austrian zither player
- Carl Braun (1822-1891), an Austrian obstetrician
