= Wiener Internationale Gartenschau 64 =

Garden festival held in Vienna, Austria

Coordinates: 48.23889°N 16.40966°E

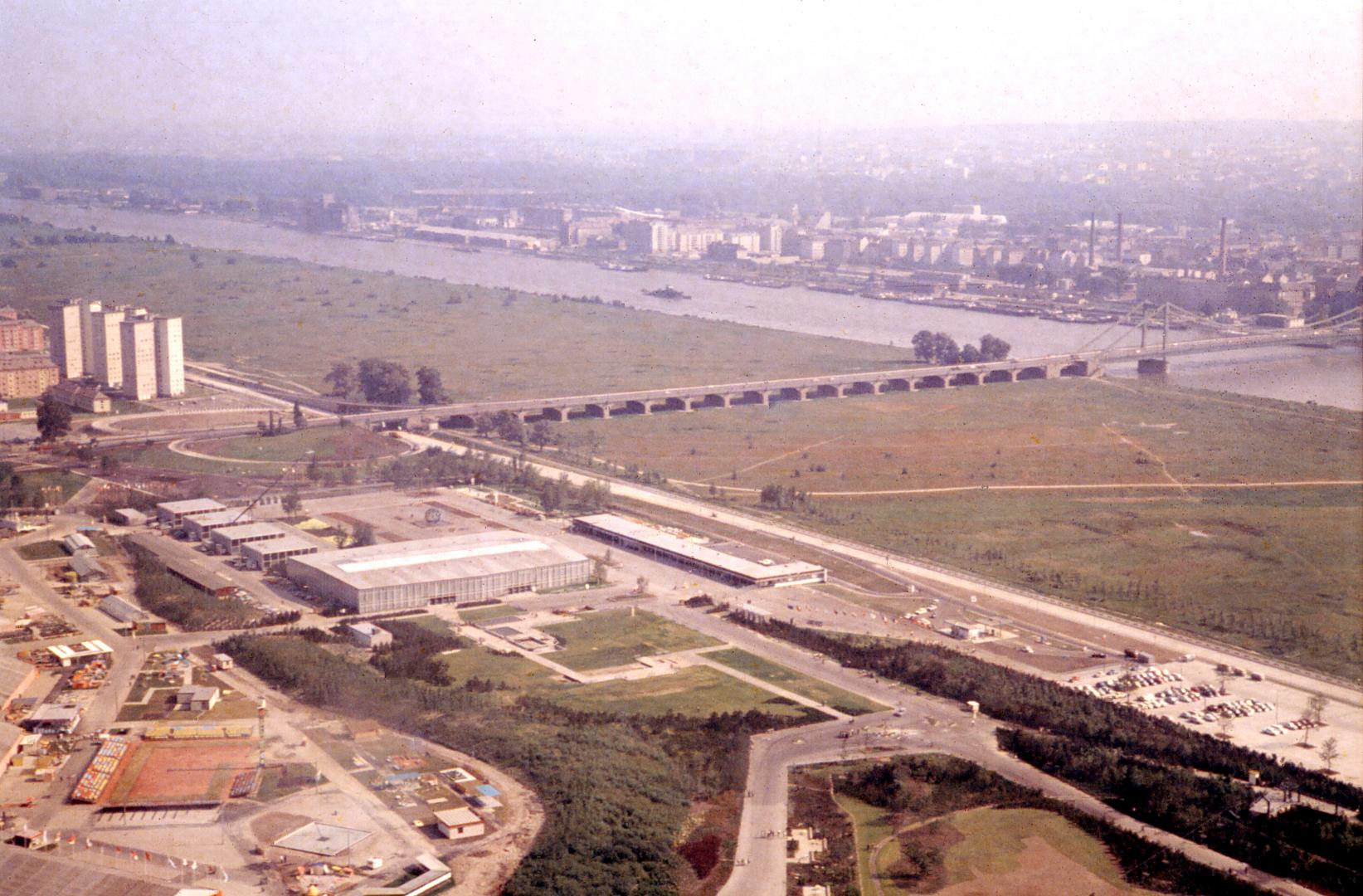
View from the Donauturm of the area of WIG 64, now replaced by Donau City: featuring the Donauparkhalle and four other exhibition halls, 1964.

The Wiener Internationale Gartenschau 64 (English: Vienna International Garden Show 64), often shortened to WIG 64, was a garden festival held in Vienna, Austria. It took place in Kaisermühlen, in the district of Donaustadt, on the site of what is now the Donaupark and the Donau City.

== History ==
Around 1960, the city administration, under Mayor Franz Jonas, decided to establish a horticultural exhibition on the area between the Hubertusdamm of the Danube, Wagramer Straße, and the Old Danube, north of the Reichsbrücke, the city's most prominent Danube bridge. This decision was also aimed at eliminating a waste disposal site on part of the area, as well as removing the remnants of an extensive informal settlement known as "Bretteldorf."

On the approximately 100-hectare site, the Donaupark and a 30,000 m^{2} lake (named Irissee, which still exists today) was created, along with a 25 km network of roads and footpaths. Several million plants were planted, with the more delicate ones housed in five exhibition halls - four smaller halls and the large Donauparkhalle - near the southeastern entrance on Wagramer Straße, opposite Schüttaustraße (today the site of Donau City). As a symbol of modern Vienna, the Donauturm, Austria's tallest structure, was constructed in the northern part of the park, beginning in 1962.

The exhibition was highly successful, attracting 2.1 million visitors and receiving international media coverage. After the exhibition ended, the site became freely accessible without an entrance fee from October 12, 1964. The success of WIG 64 prompted the city administration to host another international garden exhibition, WIG 74, ten years later in Favoriten.

However, most of the structures built for WIG 64 were gradually closed and demolished over time. This included the exhibition halls, the lake stage, the 41-meter-high greenhouse tower, the cinema, and the library with "reading hills." In the 1990s, the Donauparkhalle, which had hosted major sports events, was also demolished. Due to urban development on the eastern bank of the Danube, the park's area was reduced by about one-third to approximately 600,000 m^{2}. The 2.2 km-long double chairlift, with its triangular route, was eventually dismantled due to insufficient demand. However, some elements remain, such as the lake restaurant (also serves the Korean Cultural Center) and the Donauparkbahn, built by the operators of the Liliputbahn in the Prater.
