= Donaupark =

Park in Vienna

Coordinates: 48°14′24″N 16°25′04″E

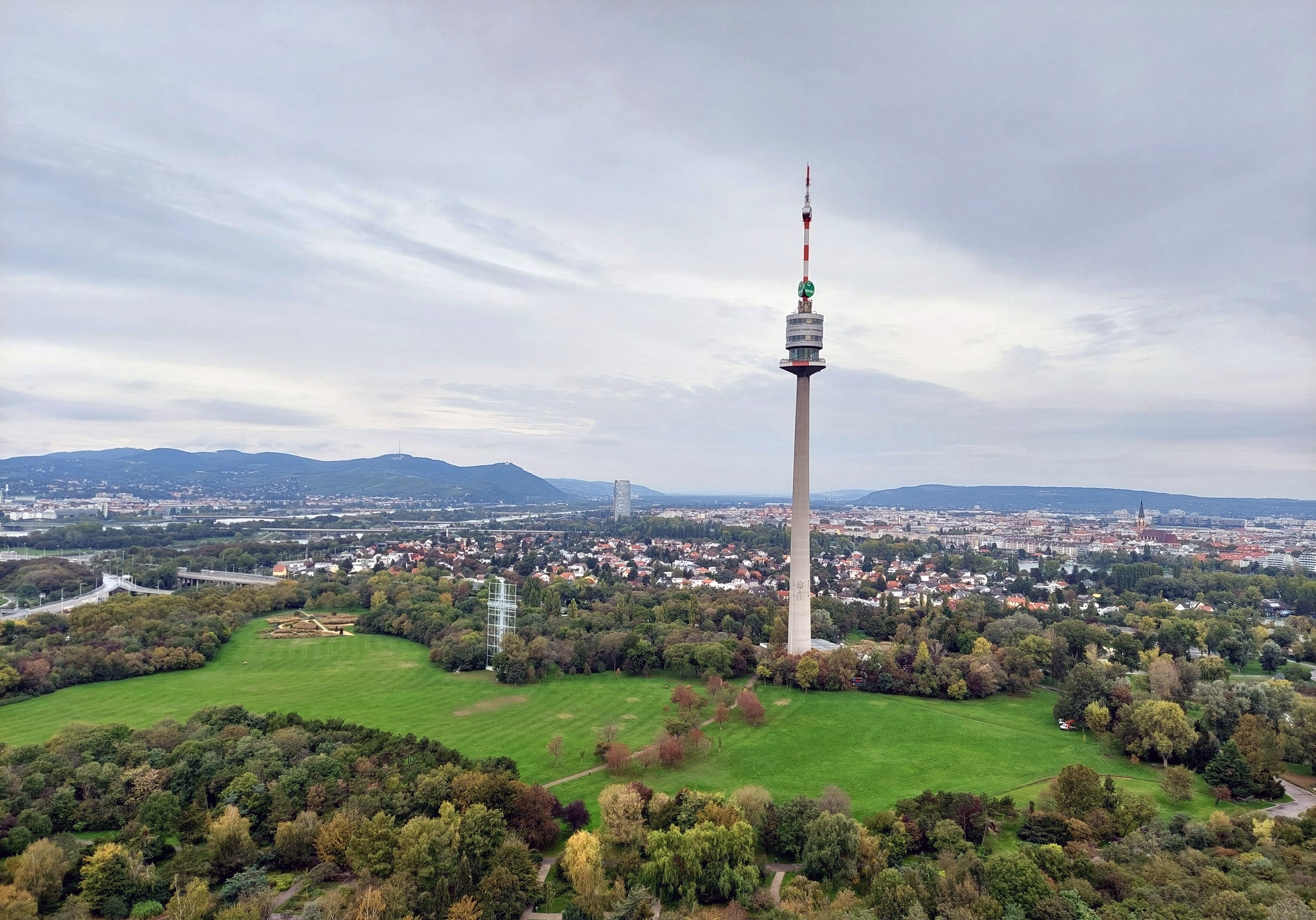
The Donauturm in the Donaupark

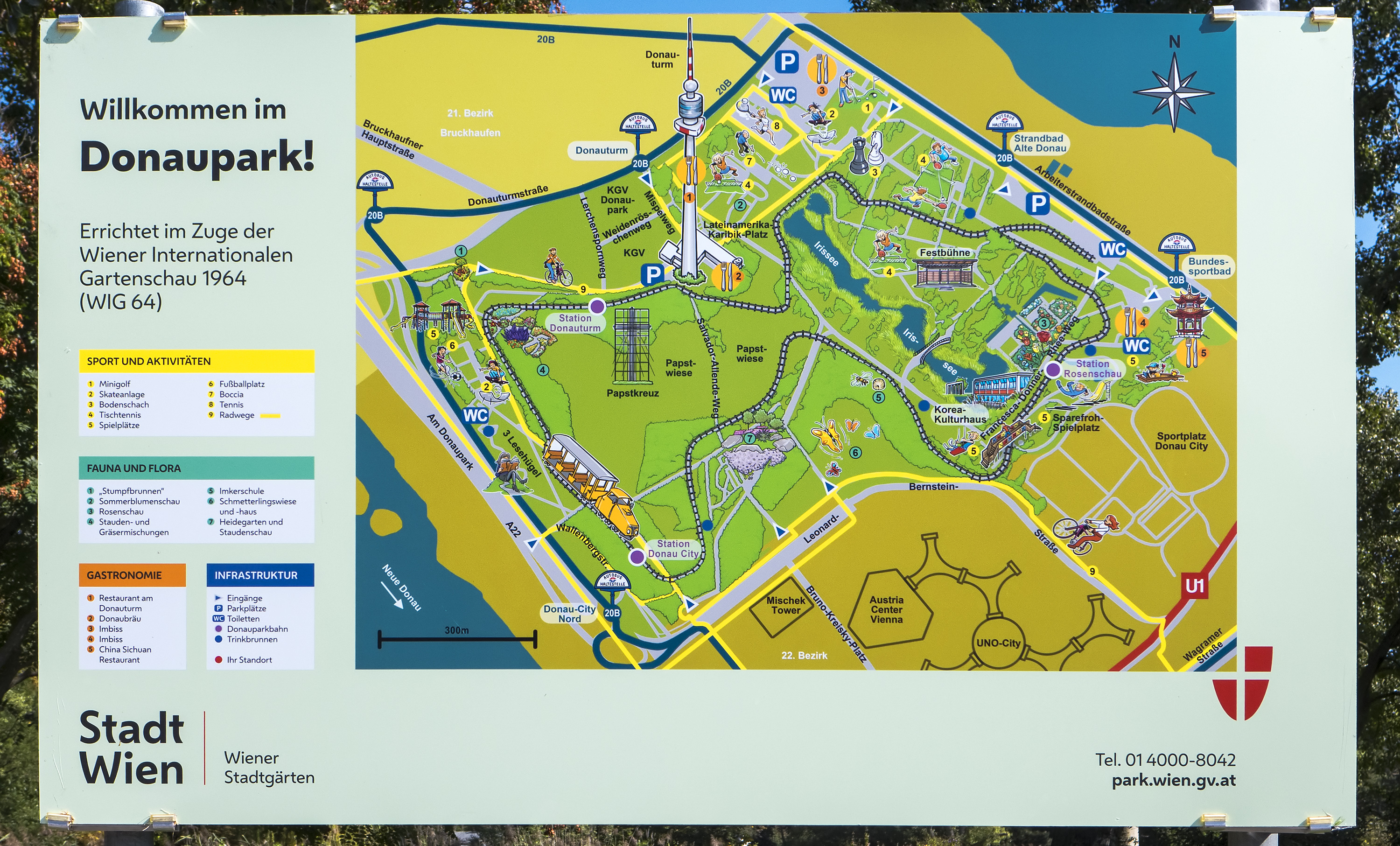
Layout of the park

The Donaupark (lit. Danube Park) is a 630,000 m^{2} park in Donaustadt, Vienna, Austria. Originally built on former wetlands between the New Danube and the Old Danube in Kaisermühlen, it was created for the 1964 Vienna International Garden Show and now sits adjacent to the UNO-City.

== History ==
The area now occupied by Donaupark was originally the site of a landfill and two informal settlements, Bruckhaufen and Bretteldorf, which emerged in the early 20th century. Despite construction bans, both settlements expanded and faced conflicts with the city administration. Bruckhaufen was legalized in 1929, while Bretteldorf remained until its last residents were relocated by 1963 to allow for the expansion of the landfill.

Following its rehabilitation, the site was identified as a potential recreational area due to its proximity to the city center, approximately 4 km away, and its location near the main traffic corridor at the Reichsbrücke. The City of Vienna decided to develop the area into a park as part of the 1964 Vienna International Garden Show.

Donaupark was officially inaugurated on April 16, 1964, alongside the Donauturm (Danube Tower), as part of the garden show. The park also featured the Donauparkhalle, an indoor ice rink, as well as a chairlift and a narrow-gauge railway to transport visitors. While much of the original 1960s park infrastructure has disappeared, some elements, such as the railway, remain.

In 1983, Pope John Paul II celebrated a holy mass during the Katholikentag on a 20-hectare section of Donaupark near the tower, now known as Papstwiese ("Pope's Meadow"), which was attended by approximately 300,000 people. For the occasion, a 40-meter-tall steel cross, the Papstkreuz, was erected.

== Features ==
=== Structures ===
The Donauturm is Austria's tallest structure, standing at 252 meters. Opened in 1964, the tower offers panoramic views of Vienna and features a revolving restaurant, an observation deck, a slide, and a bungee-jumping platform. Below the tower is the Papstkreuz, a 40-meter-tall steel cross, built to commemorate Pope John Paul II’s visit in 1983. Restaurants in the area include the Chinese Sichuan and Brunchhouse am Irissee, which offers a Korean menu as part of the Korea Kulturhaus Wien, a centre for Korean culture that hosts exhibitions, language courses, and cultural events.

Originally introduced during the garden show, the Donauparkbahn is a narrow-gauge railway that once transported visitors through the park. It has three stops: Donauturm, Rosenschau, and Donau-City.

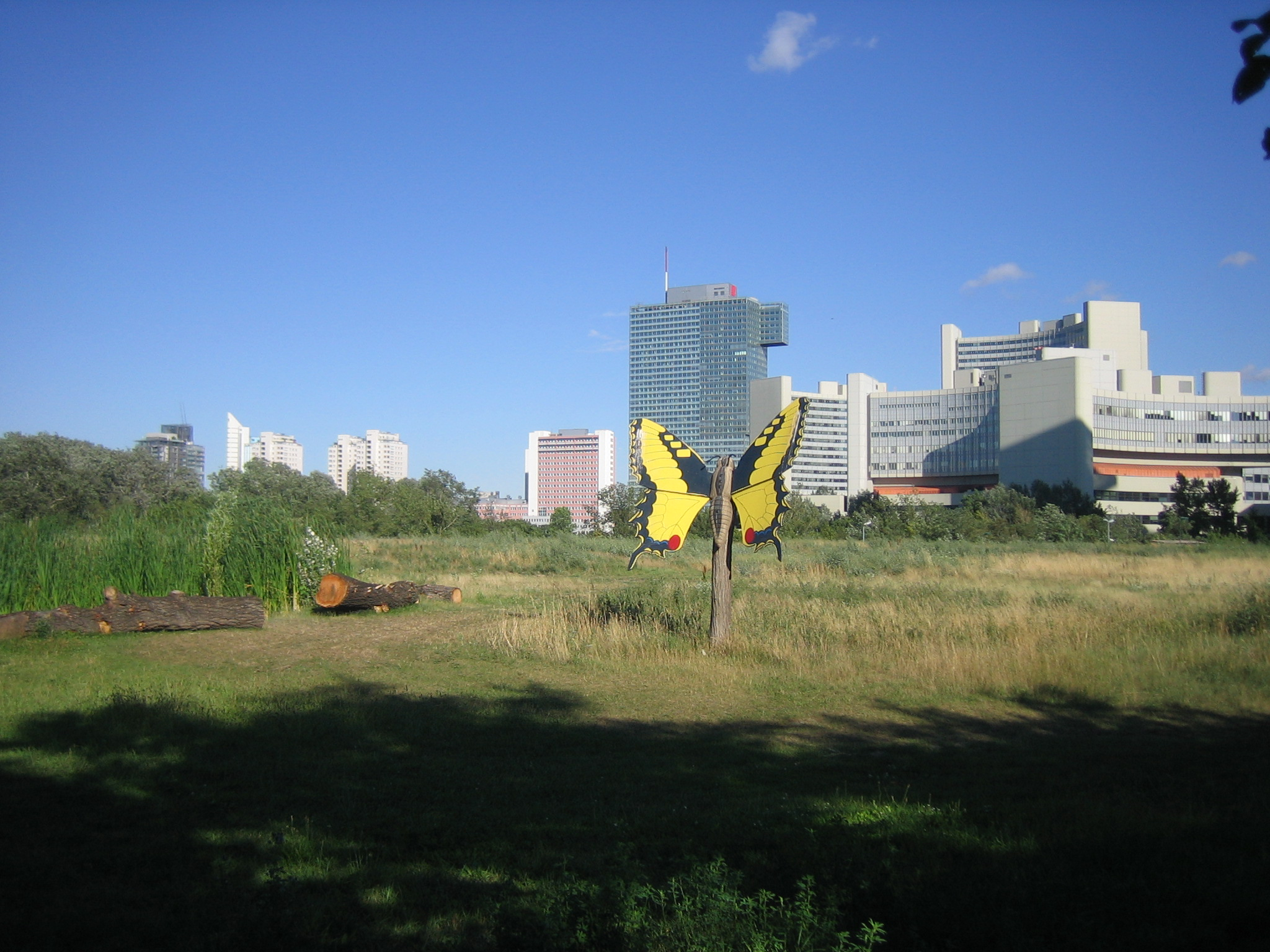
The butterfly meadow

=== Leisure ===
The park includes multiple sporting facilities, such as a basketball court, a skate park, table tennis tables, and an outdoor chessboard.

The Irissee is a small artificial lake that was created for the garden show. It was restored in 1993 to enhance its ecological function. The lake is surrounded by a natural landscape featuring silver poplars, reeds, and aquatic vegetation, such as roundhead bulrush and flowering rush.

Near the lake is the Schmetterlingswiese (Butterfly Meadow), a sanctuary home to 50 species of butterflies, including the Large copper and Jersey tiger, as well as wild bees, bats, reptiles, and amphibians.

=== Monuments and statues ===
The park contains numerous memorials, including ones dedicated to multiple Latin American figures such as Salvador Allende, Simón Bolívar, Che Guevara, José de San Martín, José Martí, and José Gervasio Artigas. Others memorialized in the park include Paracelsus and Azerbaijani composer Uzeyir Hajibeyov. The park also features several statues, as well as a mosaic by Helmut Leherb.

== Gallery ==
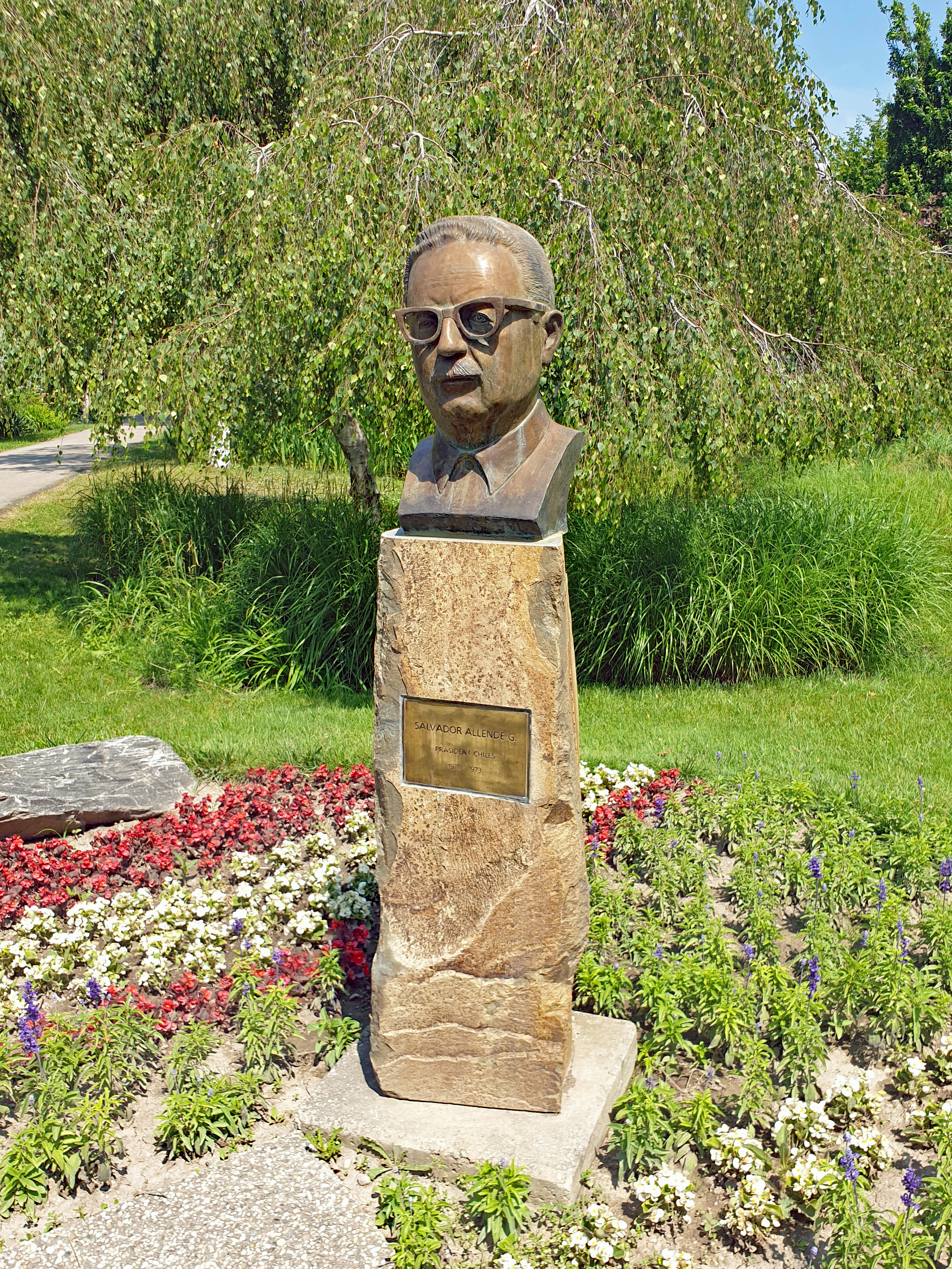
Salvador Allende

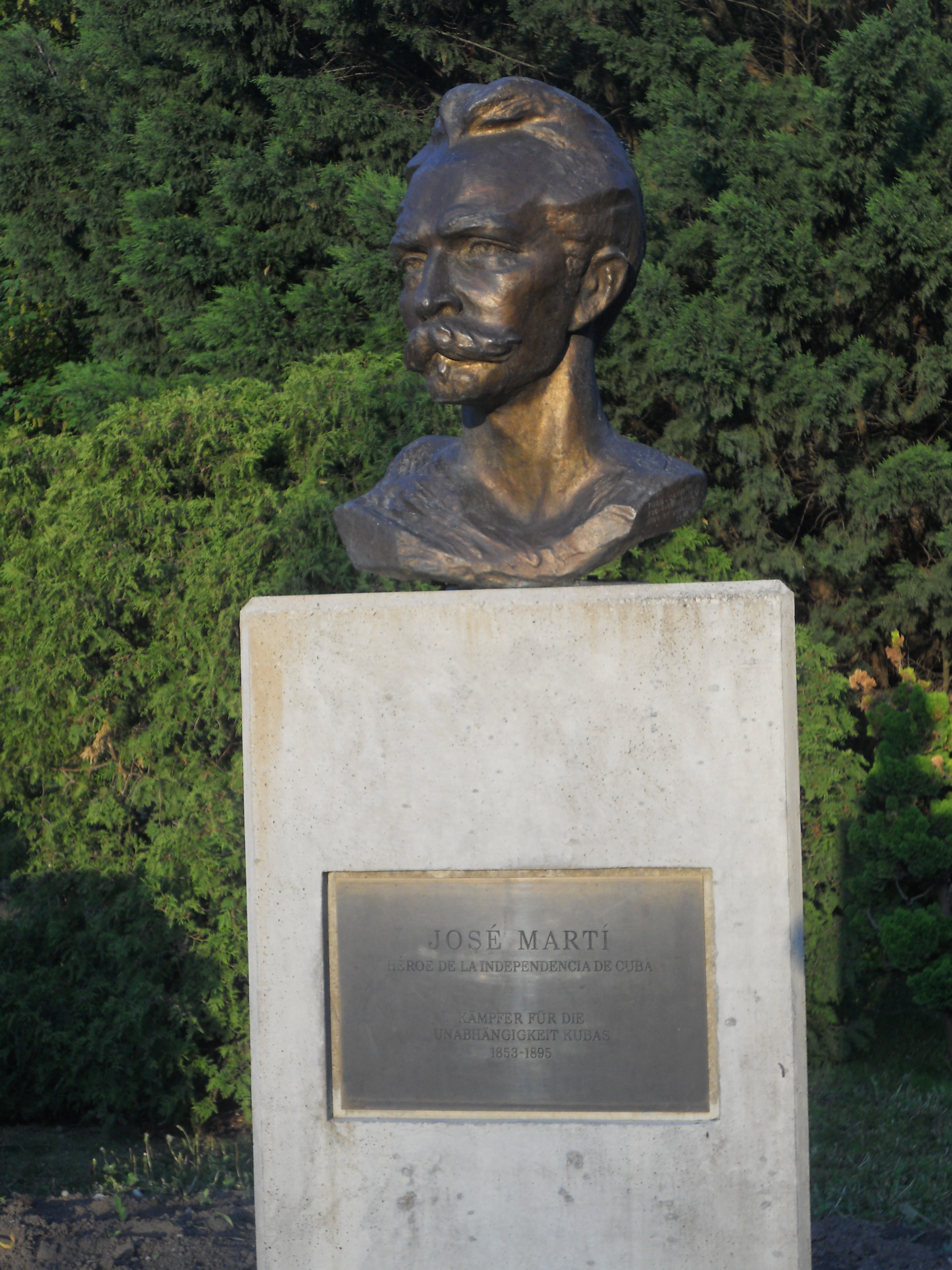
José Martí

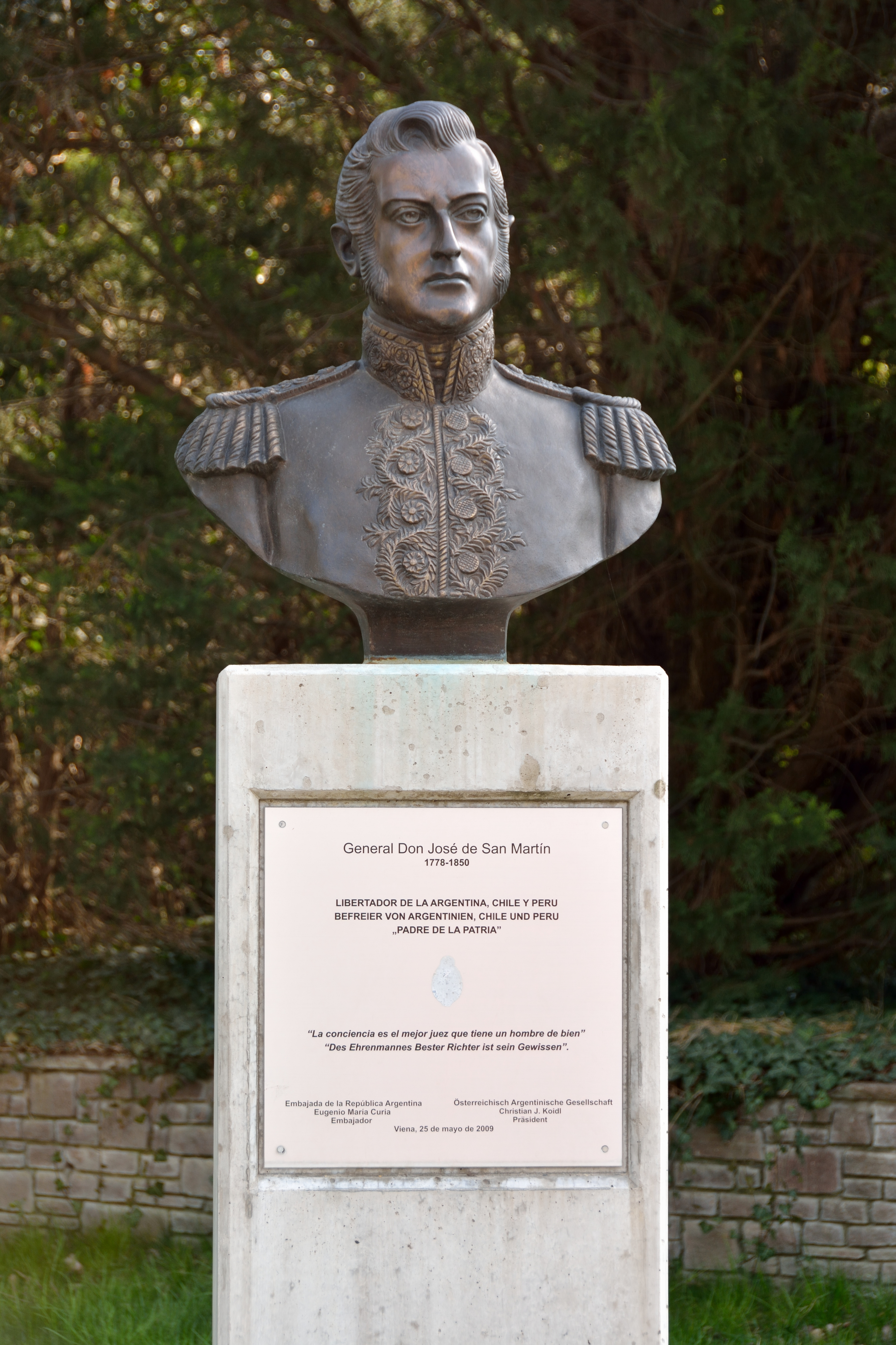
José de San Martín

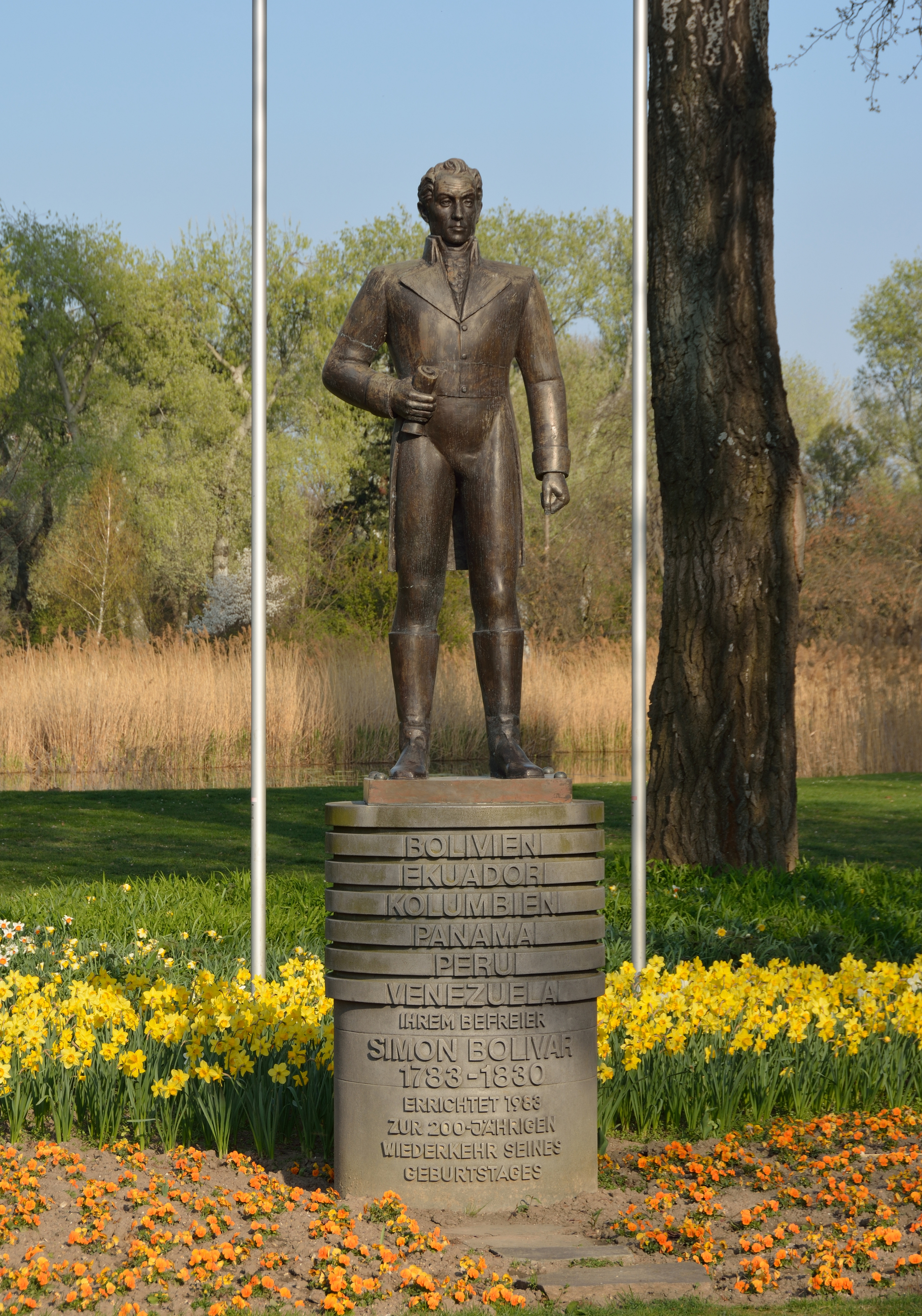
Simón Bolívar

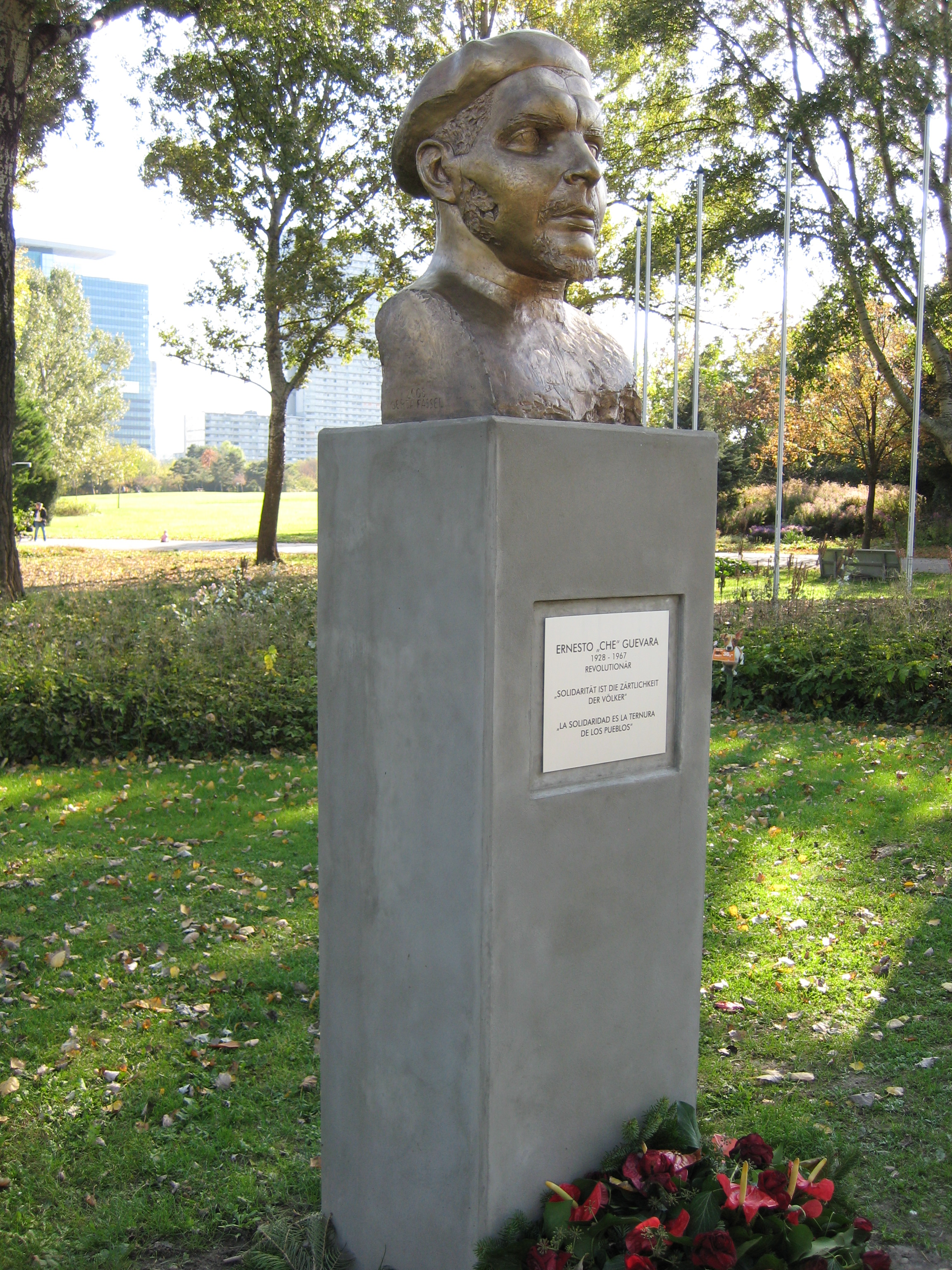
Che Guevara

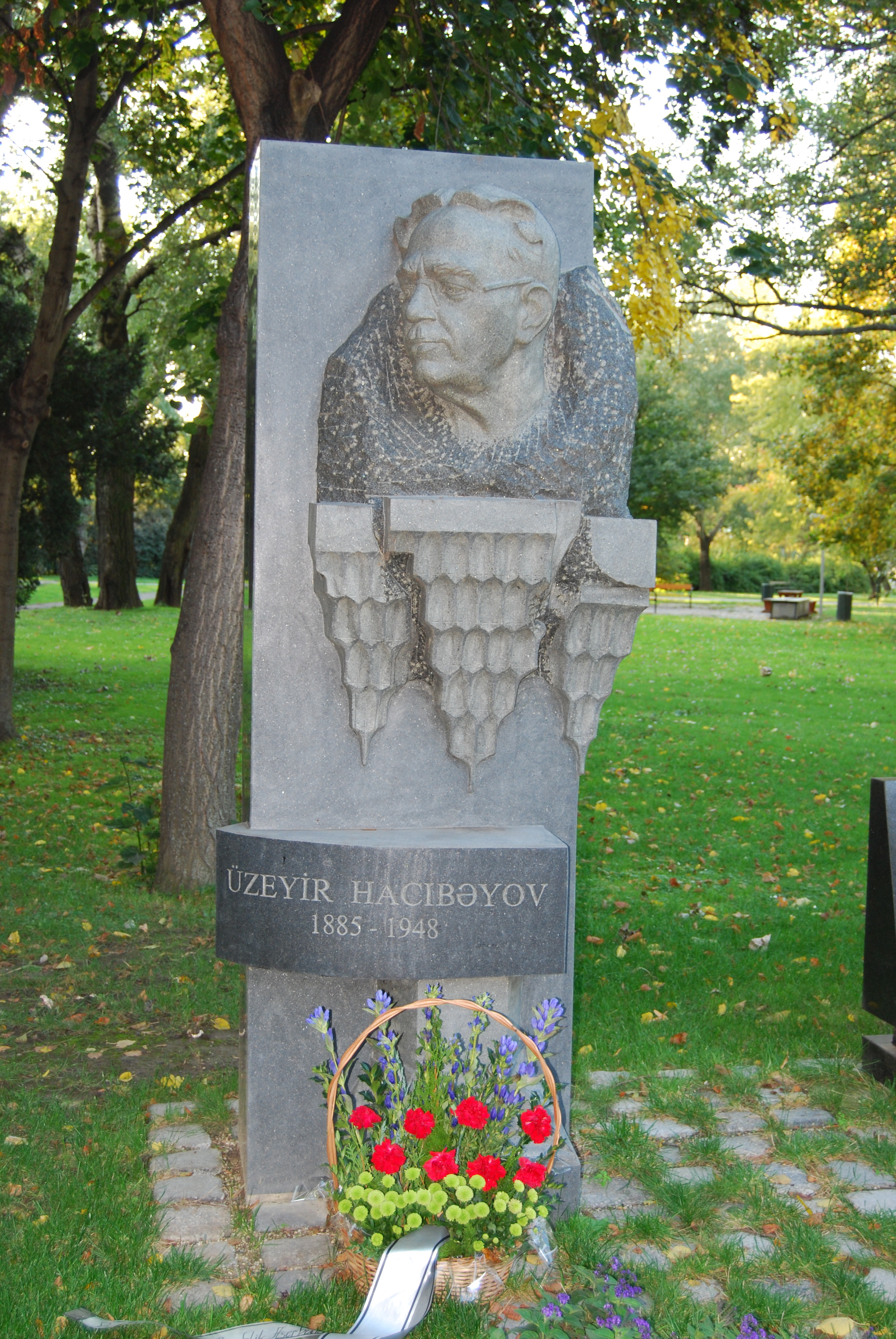
Üzeyir Hacıbəyov

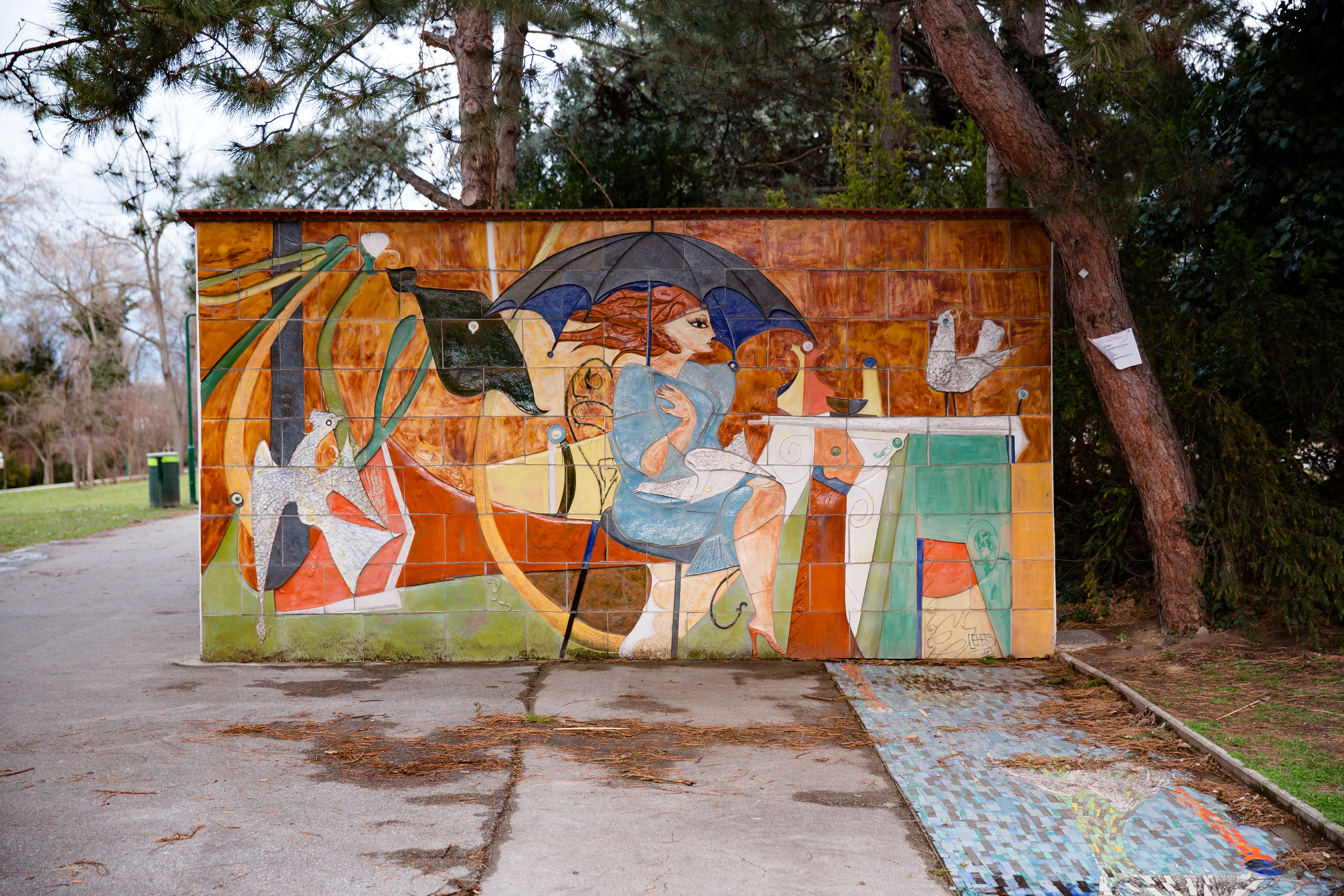
Mosaic „Im Café“ by Leherb

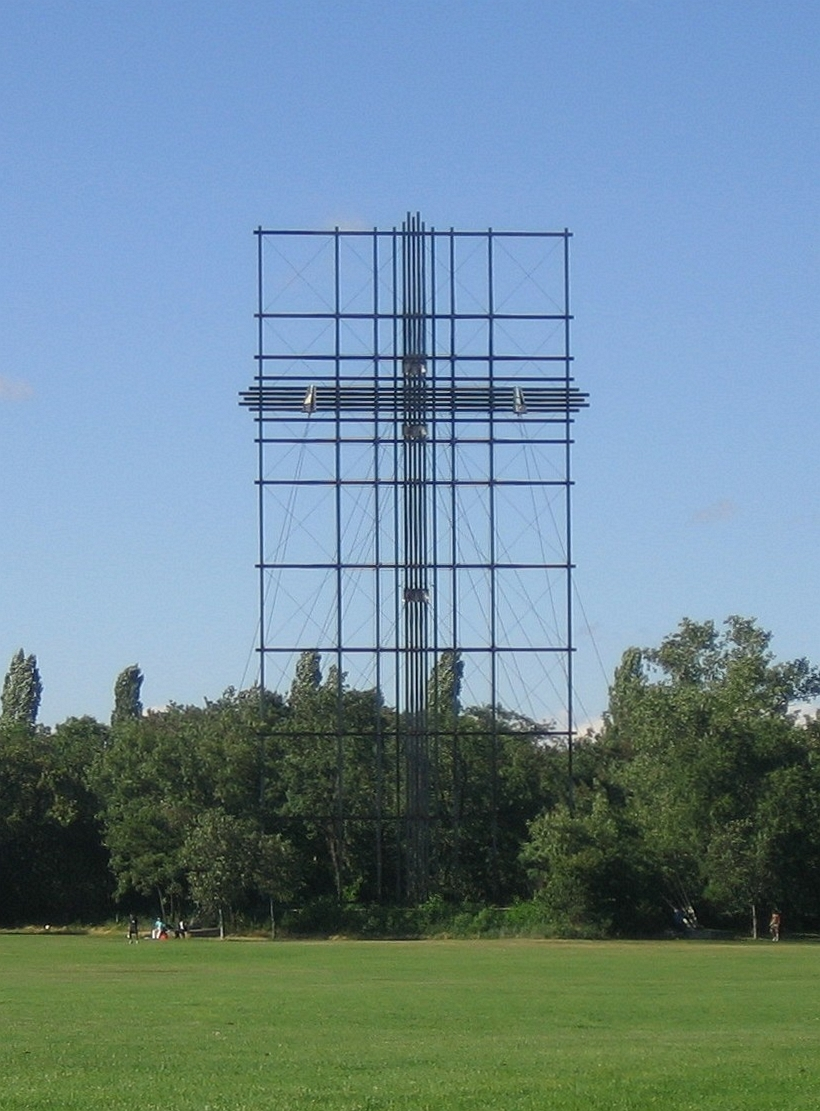
The Papstkreuz

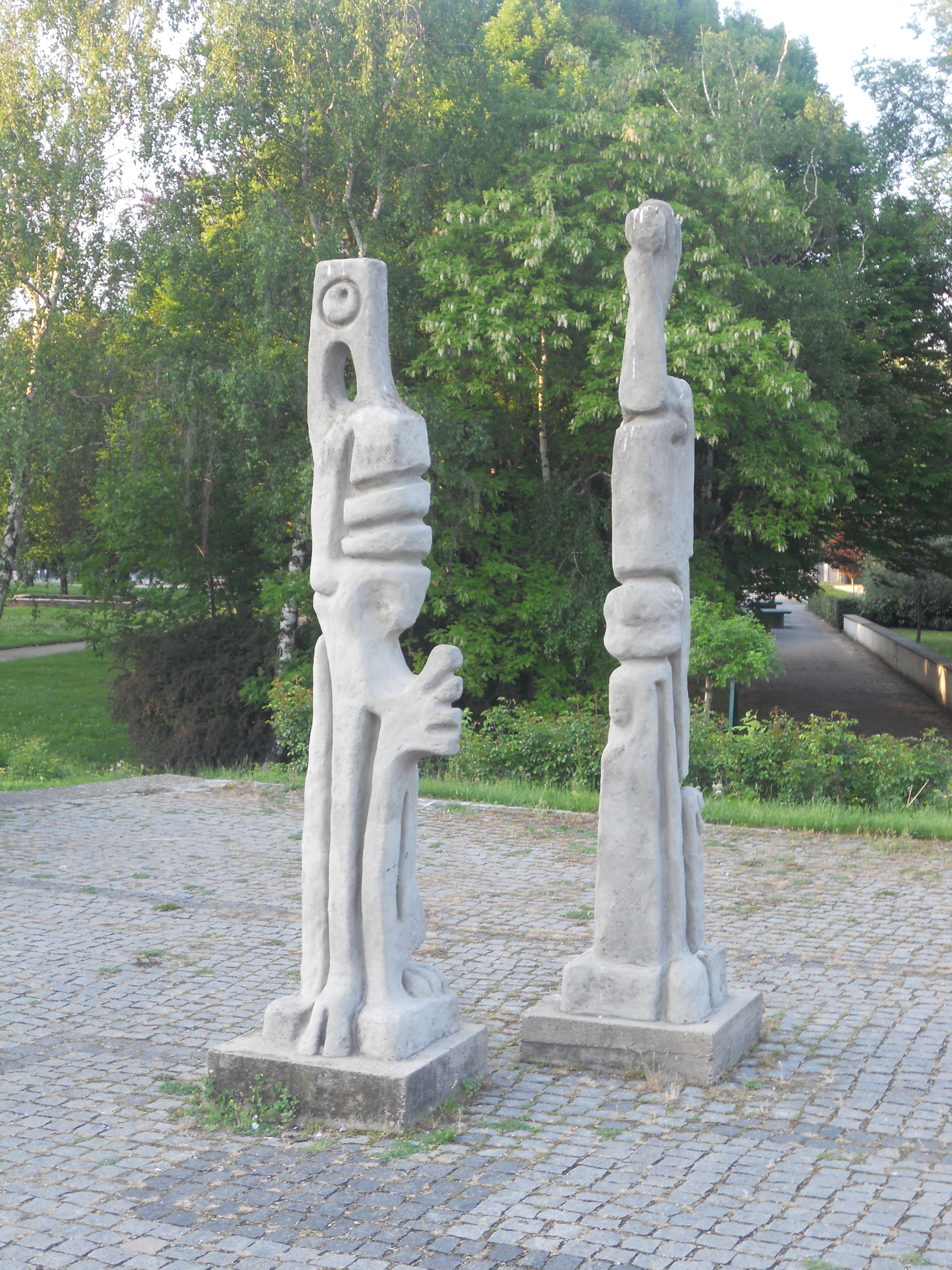
„König und Königin“ (King and Queen)

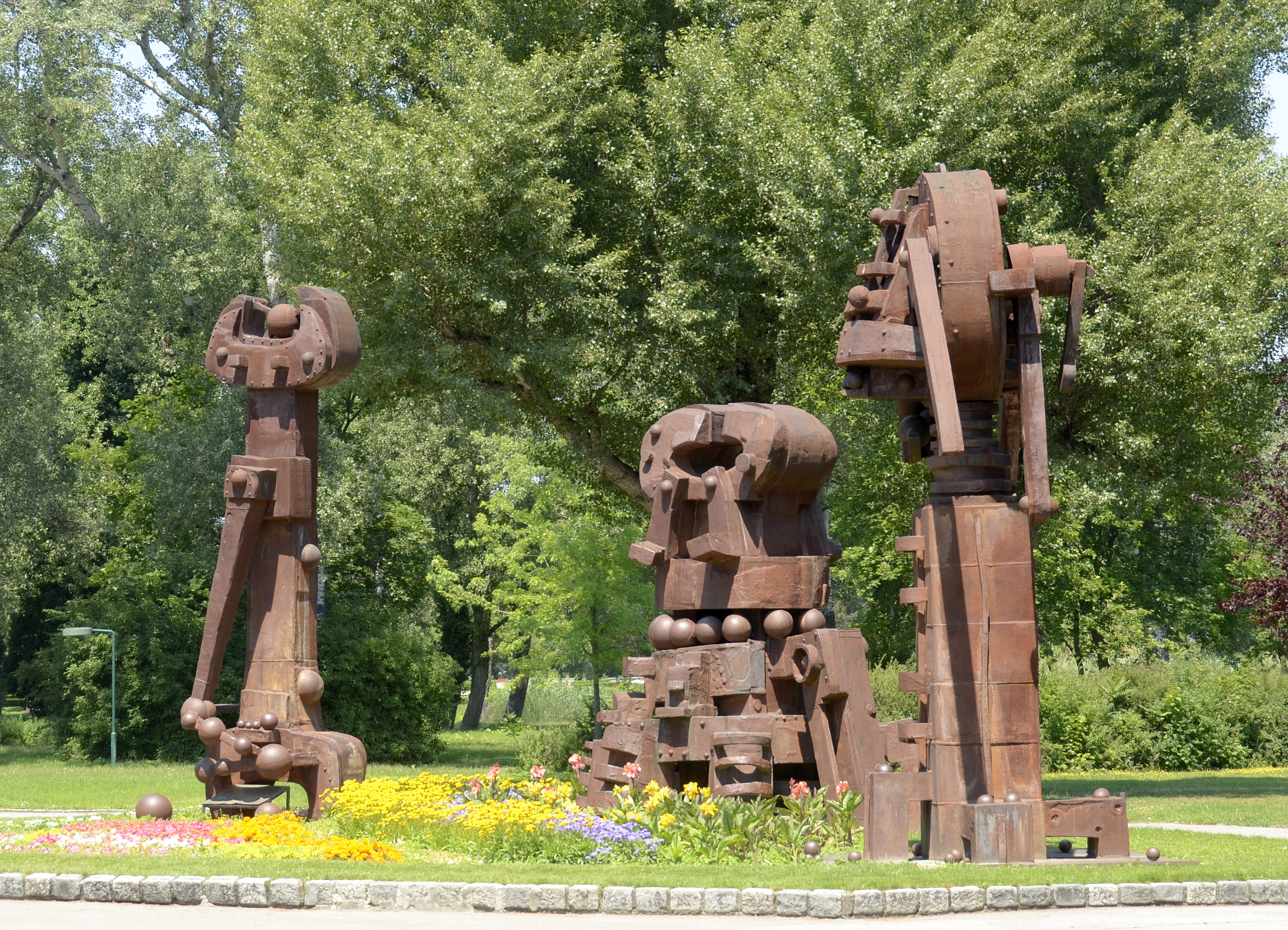
Sculpture „Das Goldene Kalb“ by Karl Anton Wolf

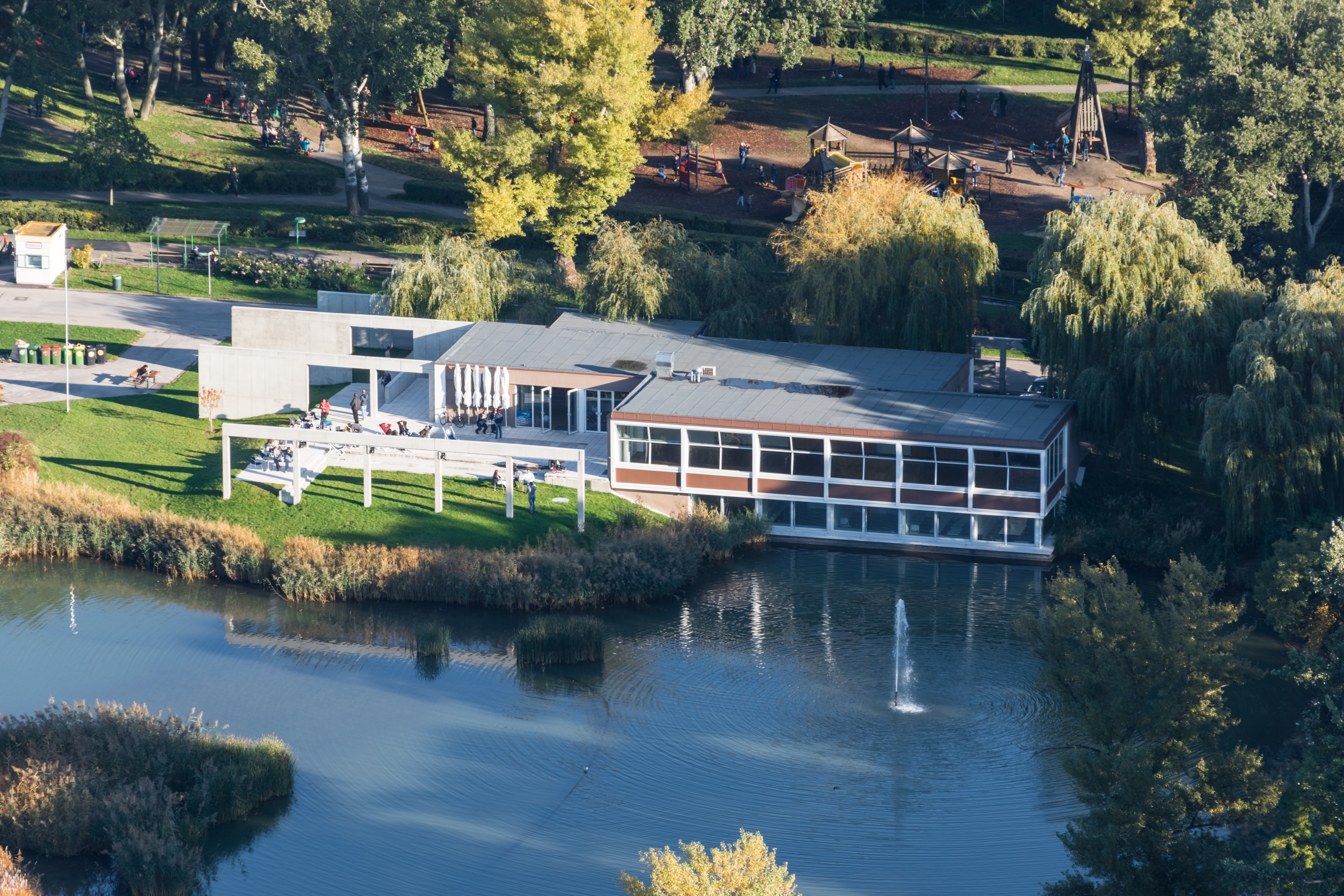
Korea culture house on the Irissee

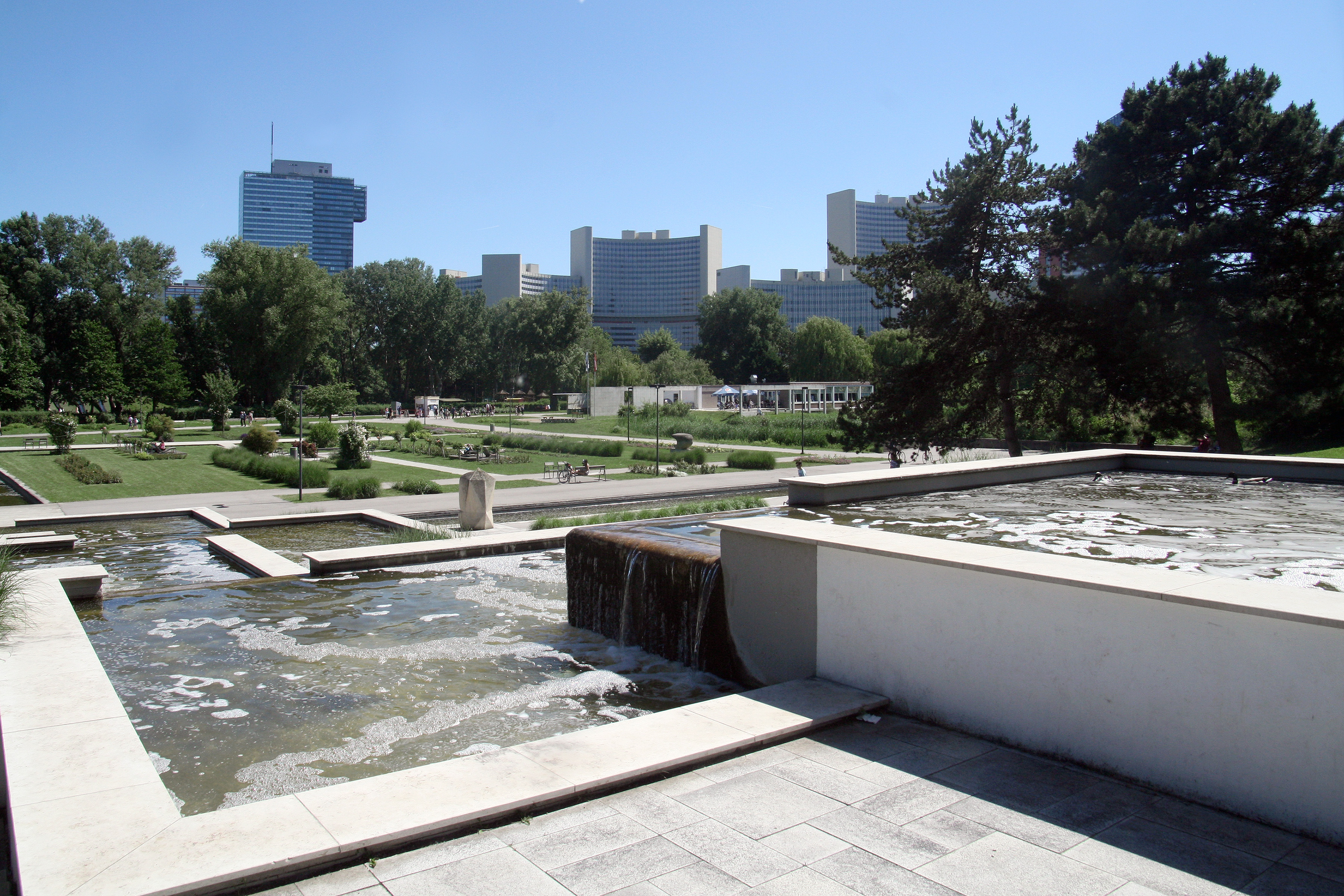
Cascades

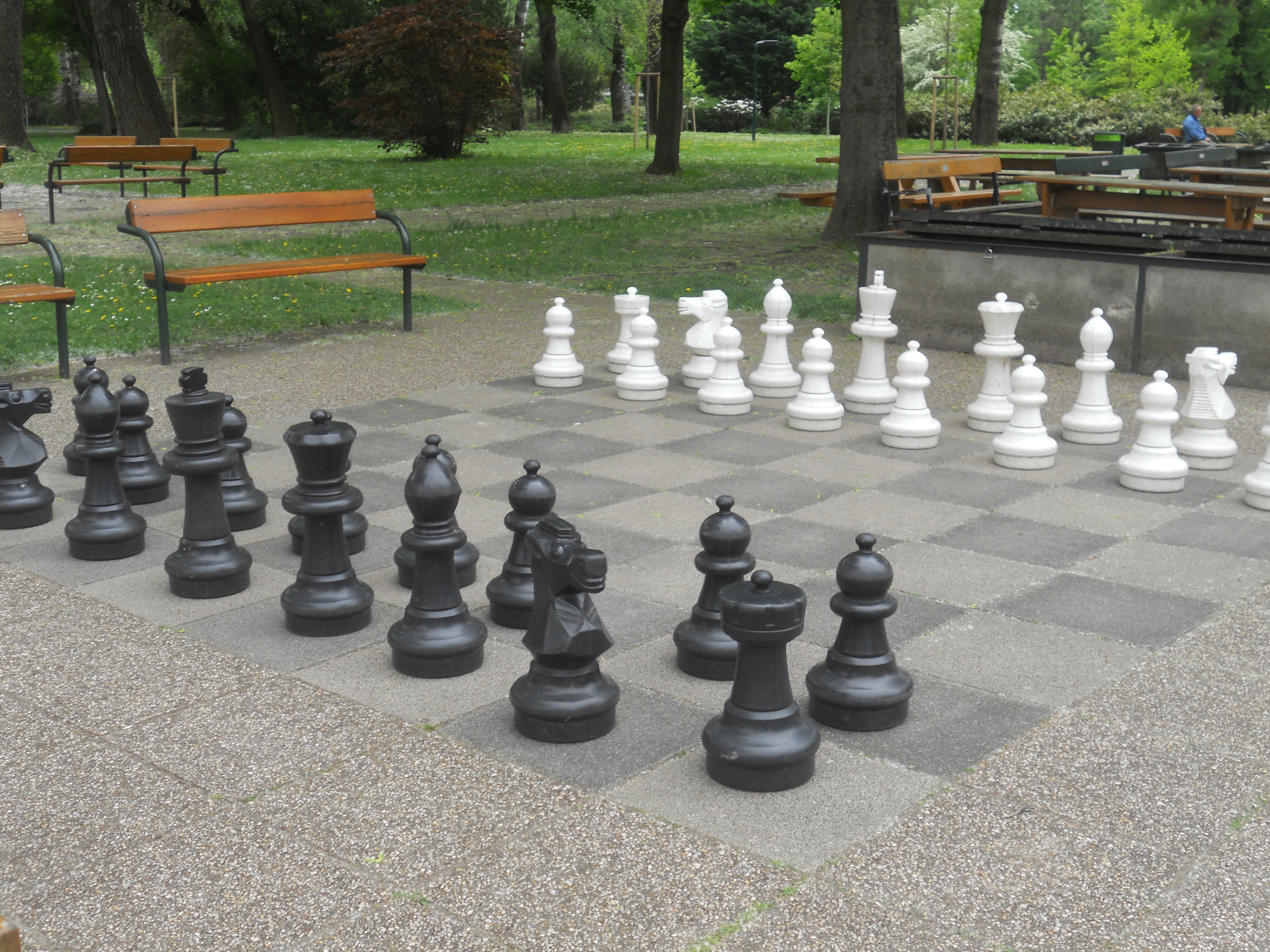
Chessboard

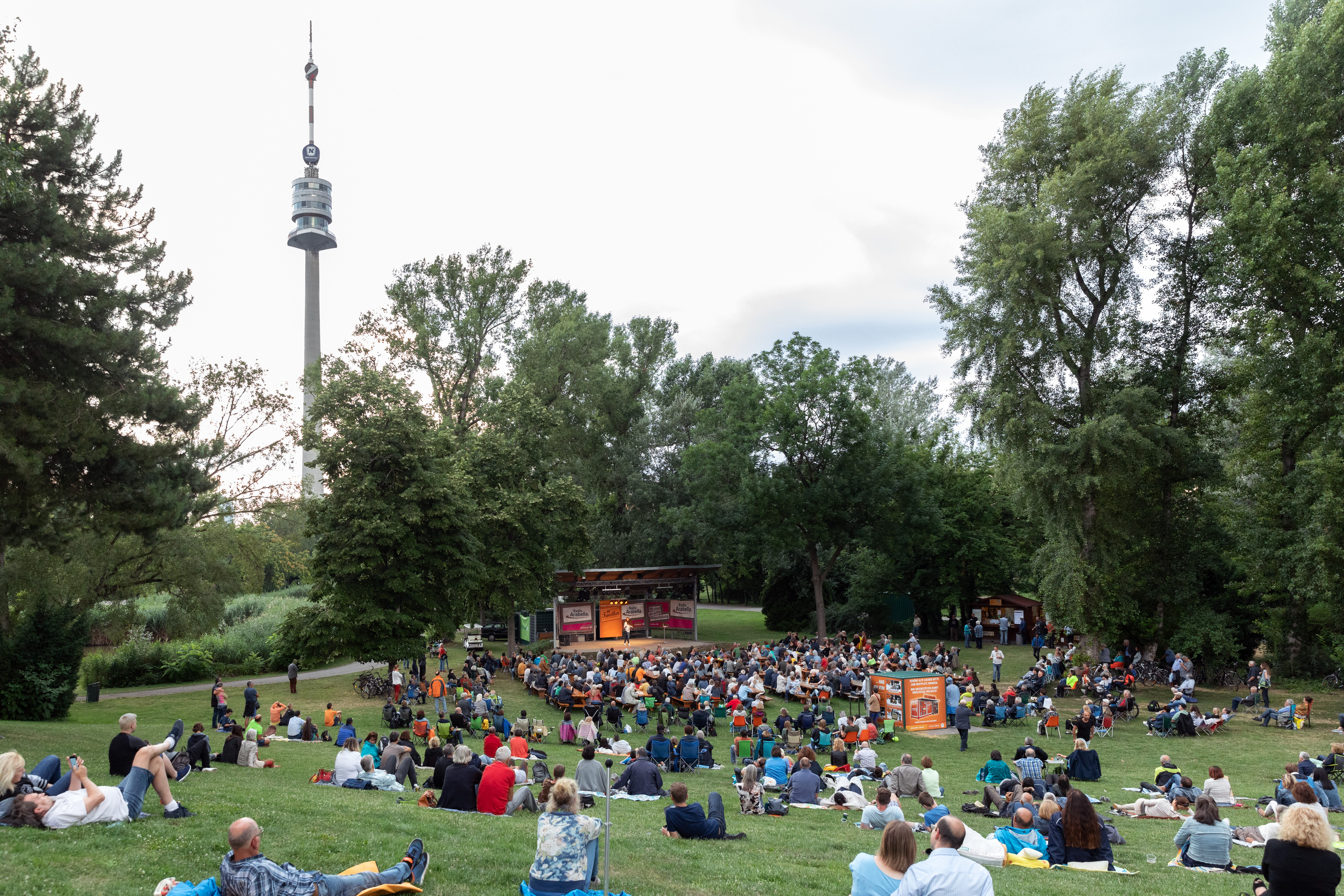
The stage

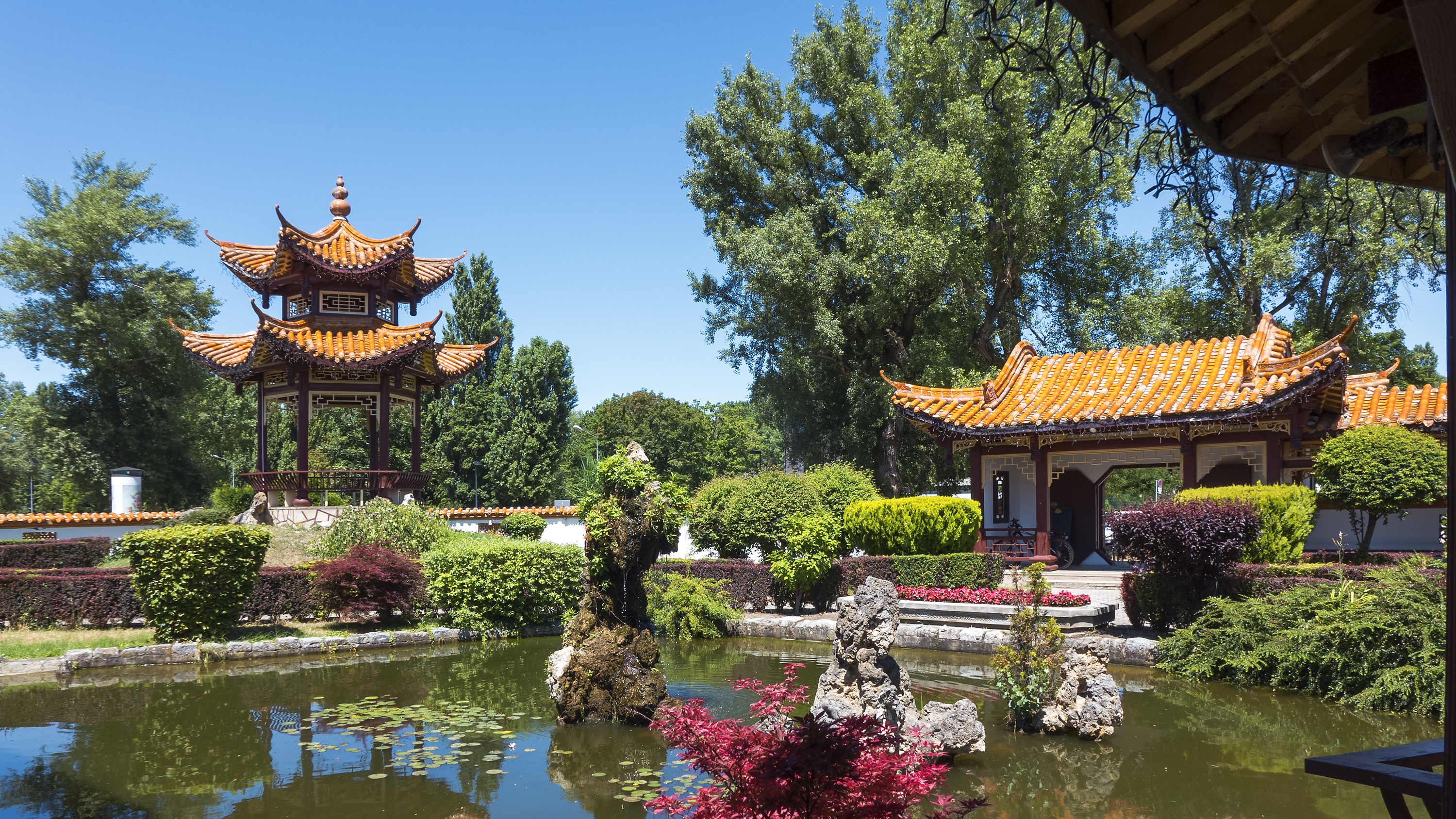
Garden of the Sichuan restaurant

== See also ==
- Wiener Internationale Gartenschau 64
