= Kaisermühlen =

Part of Donaustadt, Vienna, Austria

Coordinates: 48°14′12″N 16°24′52″E

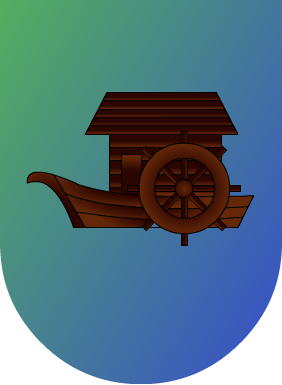
Coat of arms

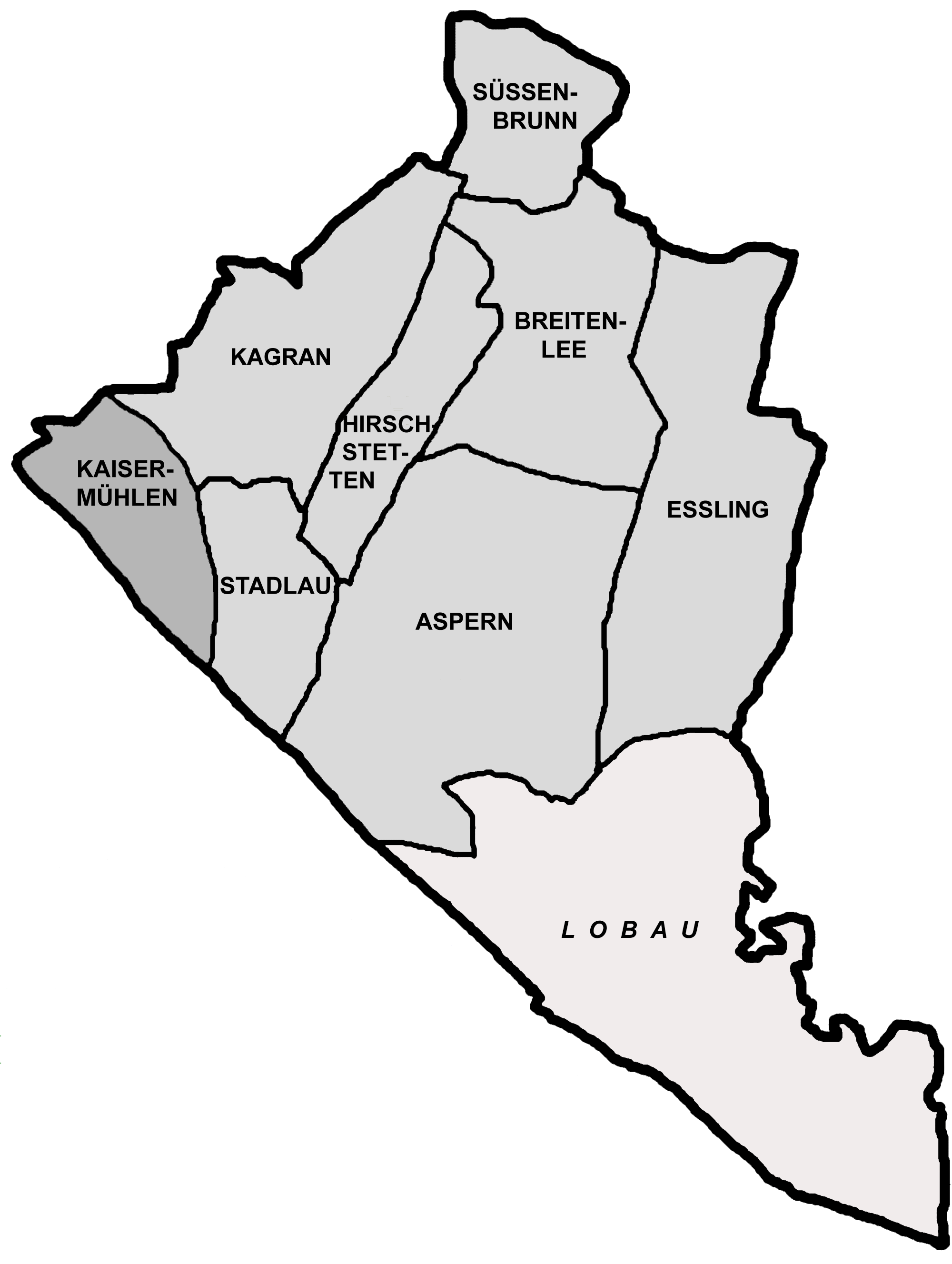
Location within Donaustadt

Kaisermühlen is a neighbourhood in Vienna, Austria, within Donaustadt, the 22nd district of Vienna. It has a population of 17,192 and covers 5.38 km^{2}.

== History ==
When incorporated into Vienna in 1850, Kaisermühlen became part of the 2nd district, Leopoldstadt. Following the Danube regulation in the 1870s, Kaisermühlen shifted from the right to the left bank of the river. The area then saw grid-like development with low-cost housing and industrial sites. In 1898, it was connected to the city with a tram line.

During the interwar period, large municipal housing projects emerged, including the Goethehof, which became a key Socialist stronghold during the Austrian Civil War, when it was bombed by the Austrian Army. In 1938, Kaisermühlen was transferred to the 21st district, Floridsdorf, under Nazi rule and was reassigned to the 22nd district, Donaustadt, in 1954.

Post-war, multiple high-rise buildings were constructed. The Donaupark, once a landfill, was transformed for the 1964 International Garden Show. In the 1970s–80s, the New Danube and Donauinsel were created. The UNO-City opened in 1979. In 1982, the Kaisermühlen U-Bahn station on the U1 was inaugurated, providing direct access to the UNO-City from the city center.

== Geography ==
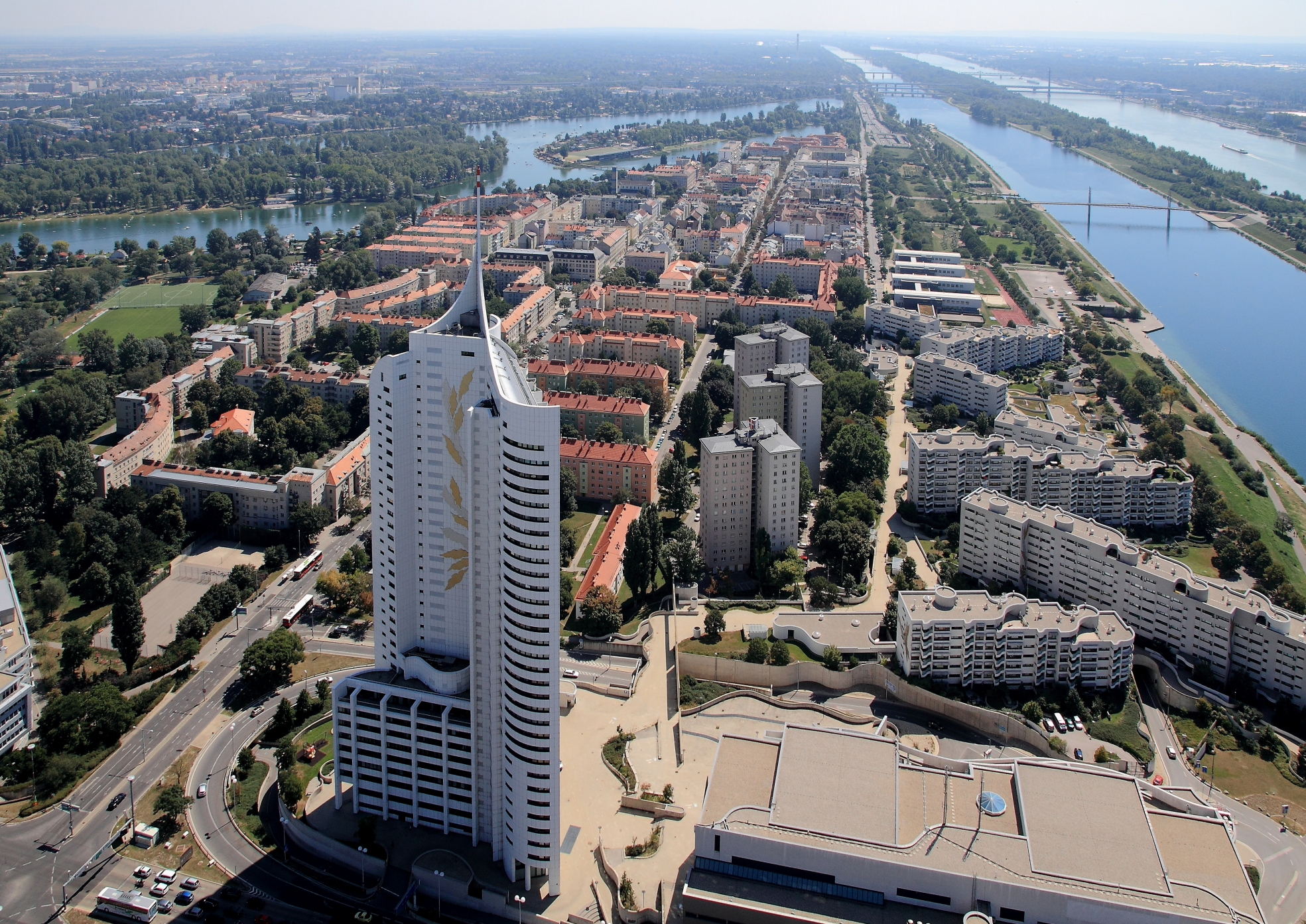
South Kaisermühlen from Donau CIty, with Gänsehäufel on the Old Danube in the upper-left corner, and the New Danube on the right..

Kaisermühlen is a quasi-island, connected to the mainland by only two narrow strips of land. It is bordered by the Old Danube to the east and the New Danube to the west. The area includes the Donaupark, Donau City, part of the Donauinsel, and the Gänsehäufel Island.

To the north, Kaisermühlen borders the district of Floridsdorf, while the Reichsbrücke links it to Leopoldstadt. The Kagraner Brücke connects it to the rest of Donaustadt.

The district features distinct residential areas: a suburban neighborhood near UNO City with houses and flats, a southern section featuring a grid of apartment blocks similar to the city across the river, and Donau City, a modern district characterised by numerous high-rise buildings, including the DC Towers.

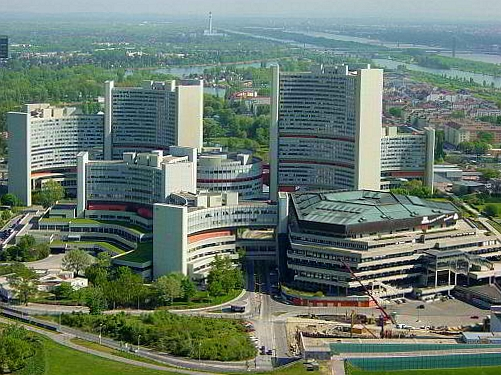
UNO City with the Austria Center Vienna in the front-right.

== Features ==
Kaisermühlen is home to the Vienna International Centre, one of the four major United Nations headquarters worldwide (Note: New York City, Geneva, Nairobi and Vienna). It houses the United Nations Office at Vienna (UNOV), along with key agencies such as the United Nations Office on Drugs and Crime (UNODC) and the United Nations Industrial Development Organization (UNIDO). Additionally, the International Atomic Energy Agency (IAEA) and other international organizations operate there. The Austria Center Vienna, a conference venue, is also situated in the centre.

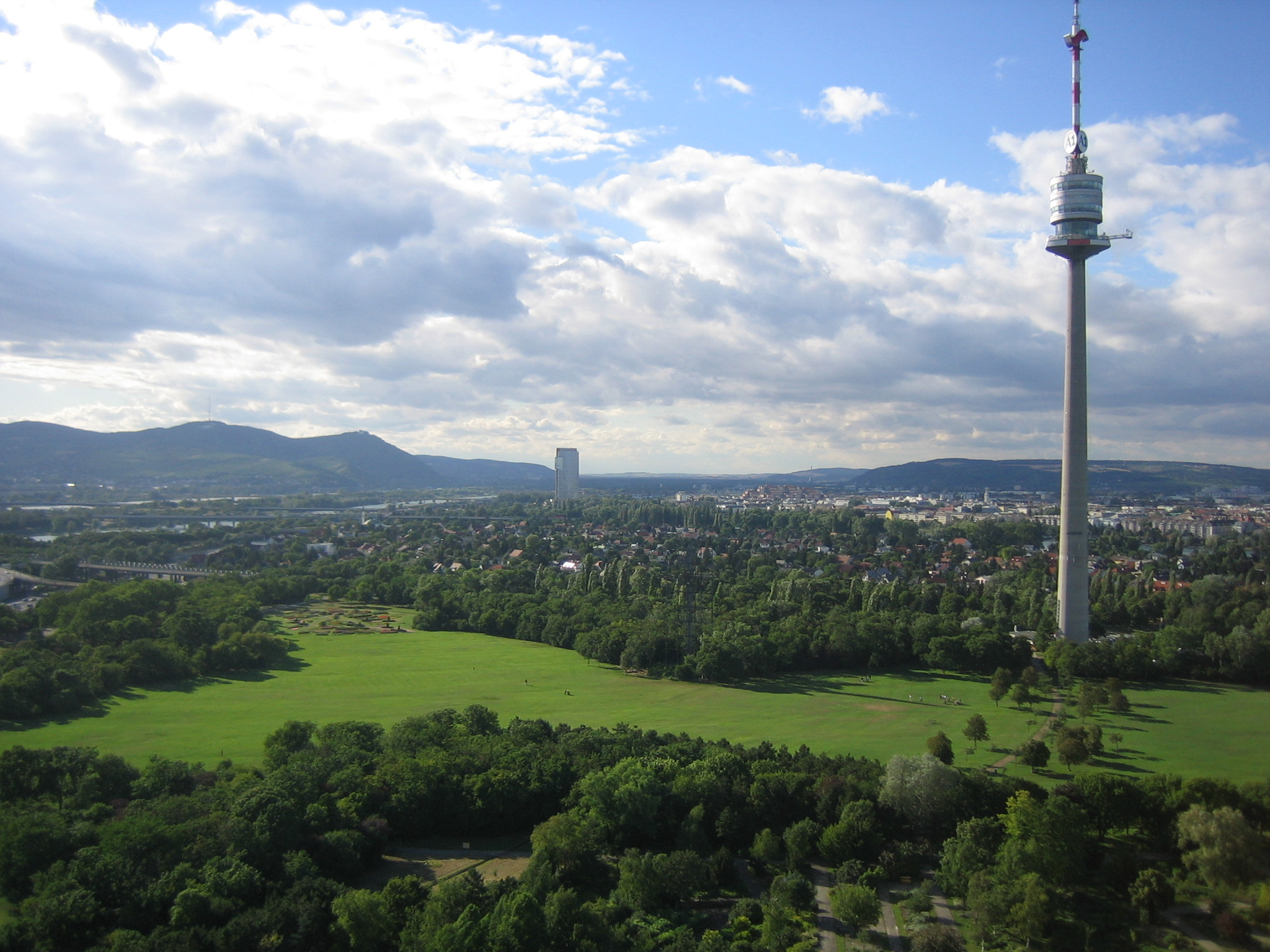
The Donauturm in the Donaupark.

Just north of the Vienna International Centre lies the Donaupark, a 63-hectare park. The park features the Donauturm, the tallest structure in Austria at 252 meters, as well as a 40-meter steel cross, erected in 1983 during Pope John Paul II's visit to Austria. Within the park are memorials to multiple Latin American figures such as Salvador Allende, Simón Bolívar, and Che Guevara.

The Gänsehäufel island on the Old Danube is home to Strandbad Gänsehäufel, a public lido owned by the city. There are also additional public beaches along both the Old and New Danube. Danube Jumping, a trampolining site on the New Danube next to the Reichsbrücke, is the largest floating trampolining site in the world. Next to it, under the bridge, is a skate park.
