= Donauparkhalle =

Former indoor ice rink in Vienna, Austria

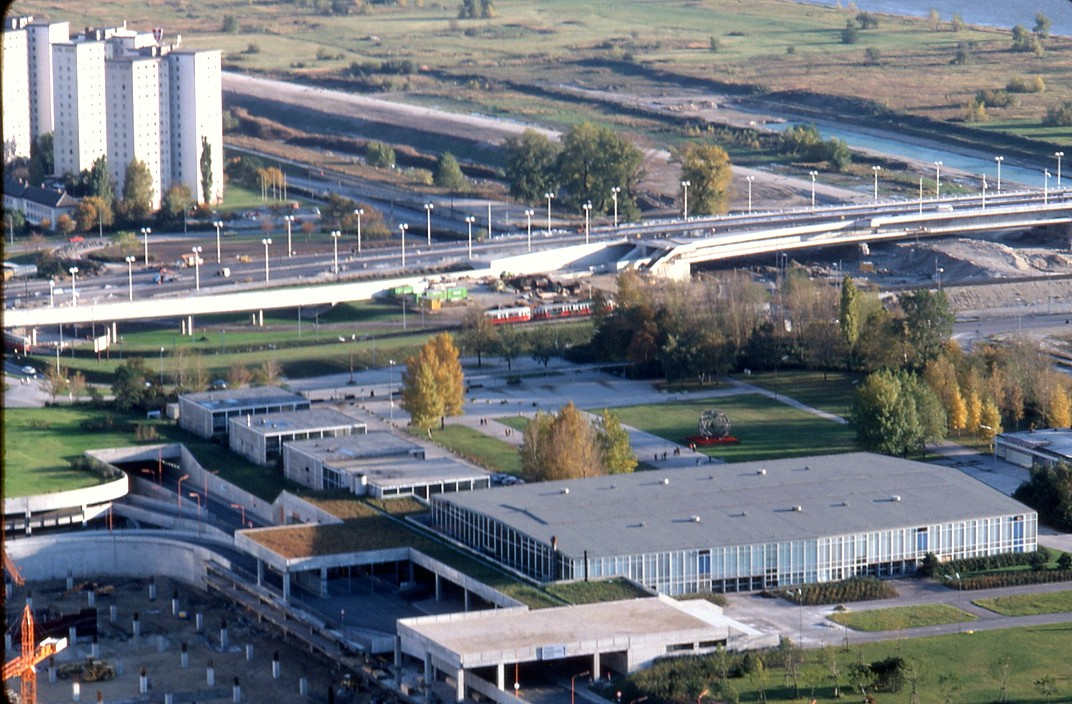
- Donauparkhalle in October 1980
- Interactive map of Donauparkhalle
- Location: Vienna, Austria
- Coordinates: 48.2344°N 16.4117°E

Construction
- Opened: 1964
- Renovated: 1966
- Closed: 1991
- Demolished: 1991

Tenants
- Wiener EV, WAT Stadlau

Donauparkhalle (Danube Park Hall) was an indoor ice rink in Vienna-Donaustadt in Austria. It was originally built as an expo venue in 1964, next to an earlier landfill in Donaupark near Kaisermühlen, to be used for the garden-themed exhibition Wiener Internationale Gartenschau. Two years later, it was rebuilt into an indoor ice rink.

During the 1966/1967 season, Wiener EV played its first home games inside. Later, it was used as home venue for the Vienna club WAT Stadlau. The venue was popular for its acoustics. The venue was demolished following the 1990/1991 season, as the area was planned to be used for the 1995 world exhibition that was never hosted.

== Major events ==
In 1967 the Wiener Stadthallenturnier, despite the name, was held there instead of inside the Wiener Stadthalle. Even the world championships in ice stock sport and nine-pin bowling have been held inside.

Even the 1967 and the 1987 World Ice Hockey Championships were held inside. The World Figure Skating Championships have also been held here.
