= Ship mill =

Watermill on a floating platform

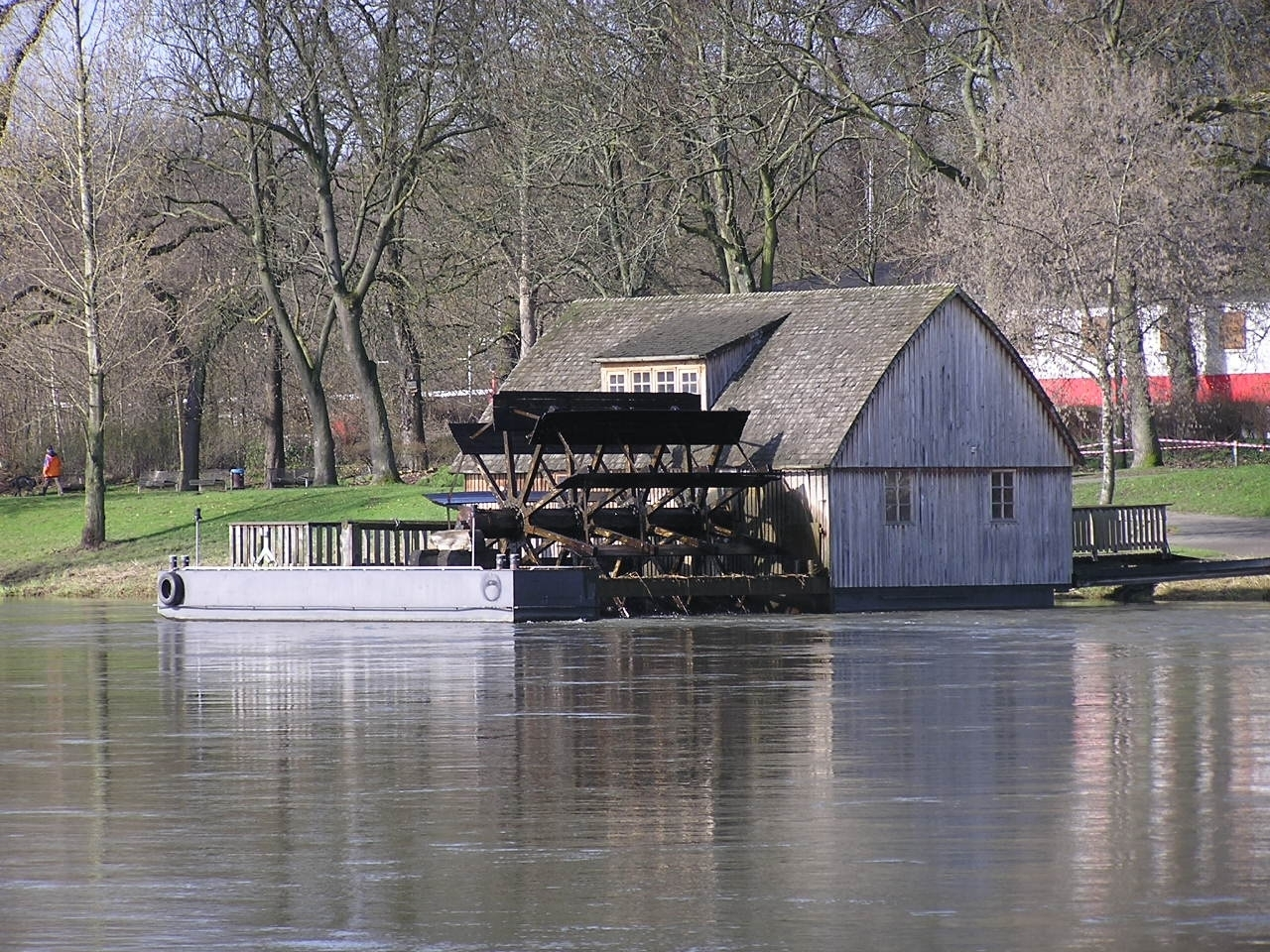
The ship mill at Minden, Germany

A ship mill, more commonly known as a boat mill, is a type of watermill. The milling and grinding technology and the drive (waterwheel) are built on a floating platform on this type of mill. Its first recorded use dates back to mid-6th century AD Italy.

== Technology ==
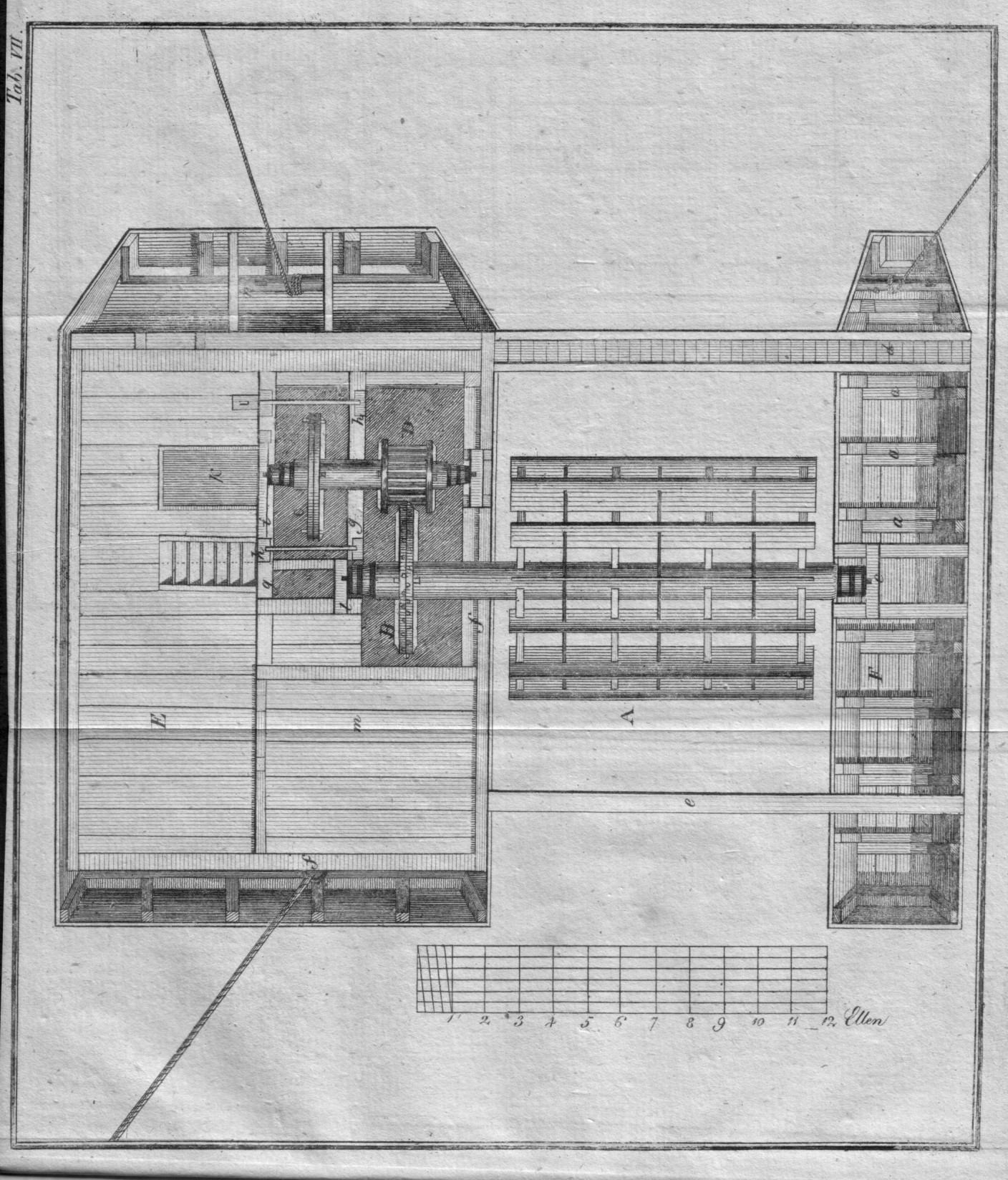
A ship mill (drawing 1 after H.Ernst, 1805)

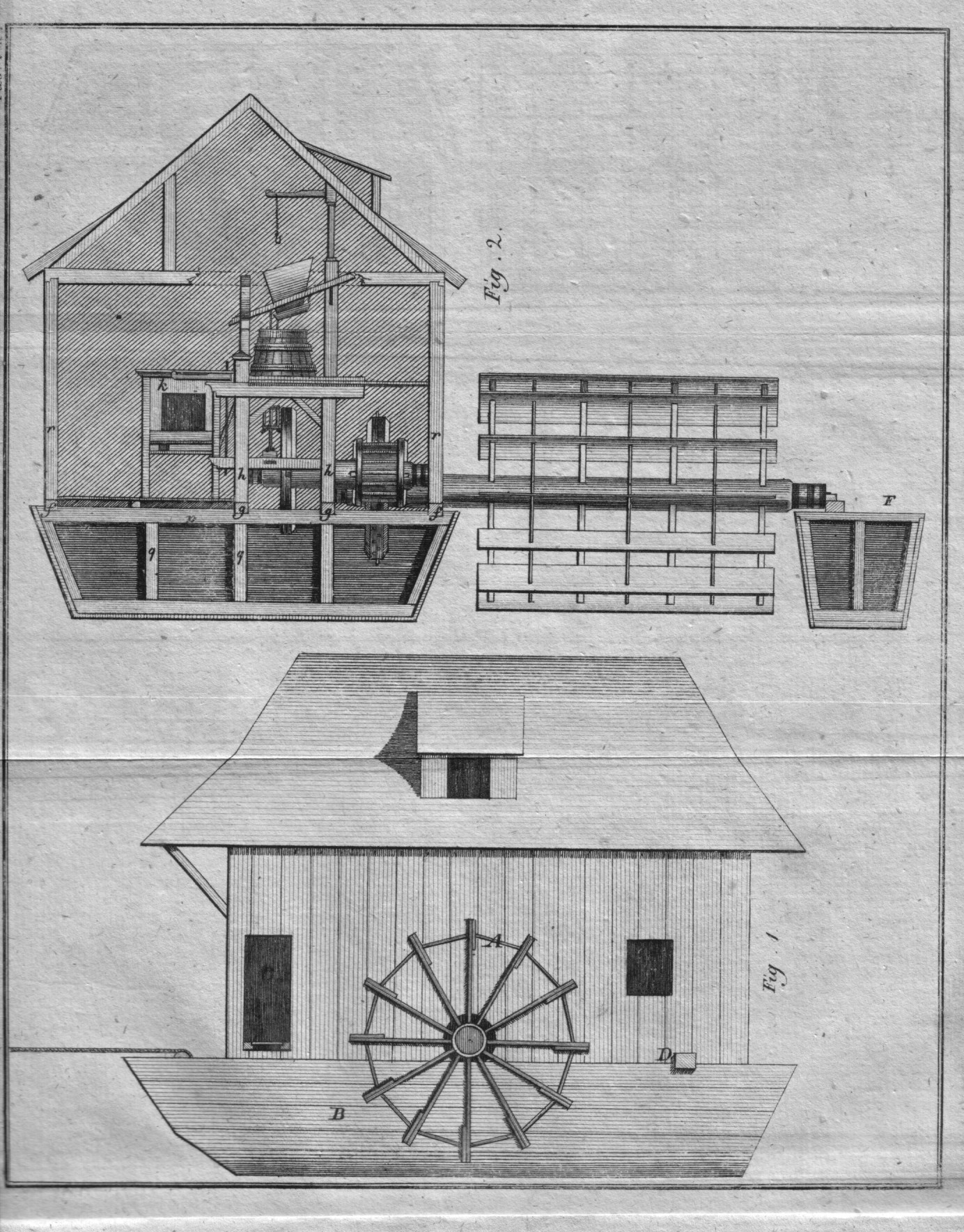
A ship mill (drawing 2 after H.Ernst, 1805)

Between barge and boat well is the undershot water wheel, which is driven by the flowing water of the current. There is also evidence of water mills for which both sides had a narrower water wheel, similar to an old paddle steamer. The floating platform is anchored at the most intense point in the current, to the bridge piers for easy access to the mill, or to the shore.

Floating allows the mill to operate with the same power despite changing water levels. The efficiency of the mill can at best match a standard undershot mill. Ship mills could potentially run full-time, good for tasks that demanded constant power.

Ship mills could be drawn to shore (due to shipping, rafting, ice) when needed. In central Europe ship mills were, as most water and wind mills, owned by lords or monasteries. Ship mills in Central Europe have not remained; after the advent of riverboat traffic, they became a hindrance. Ship mills last about fifty years.

== History ==
In the 537 siege of Rome, supplies were interrupted by the Goths from providing the population with vital flour from the surrounding water mills. Also, the aqueducts that supplied Rome with water and some cities which had water-driven mills could no longer work. The solution devised by the Eastern Roman general Belisarius was the "reverse principle of a water mill" - the ship mills, which were anchored on the Tiber river around Rome.

It was a type of watermill powered by water wheels mounted on the sides of vessels moored in midstream, preferably close to bridges where the current is stronger. From then on, the ship mill spread to Europe, reaching Paris (556), Geneva (563) and Dijon (c. 575).

Ship mills were developed in the Islamic world some time between the 8th and 10th centuries. They were employed along the Tigris at Mosul in 10th-century Iraq, where large ship mills made of wood and iron could produce 10 tons of flour from corn daily for the granary in Baghdad. In 1184, Ibn Jubayr described ship mills in the same region on the Khabur River. From the lack of records, it appears that they did not spread further to Iran.

From the late 10th century onwards, there was an expansion of milling in Northern Europe. Since then, ship mills were common in much of Europe until the 19th century, with a few of them surviving today.

The German terms "Schiffsmühle" or "Schiffmühle" are used according to local language preferences.

== Geographical spread of ship mills ==
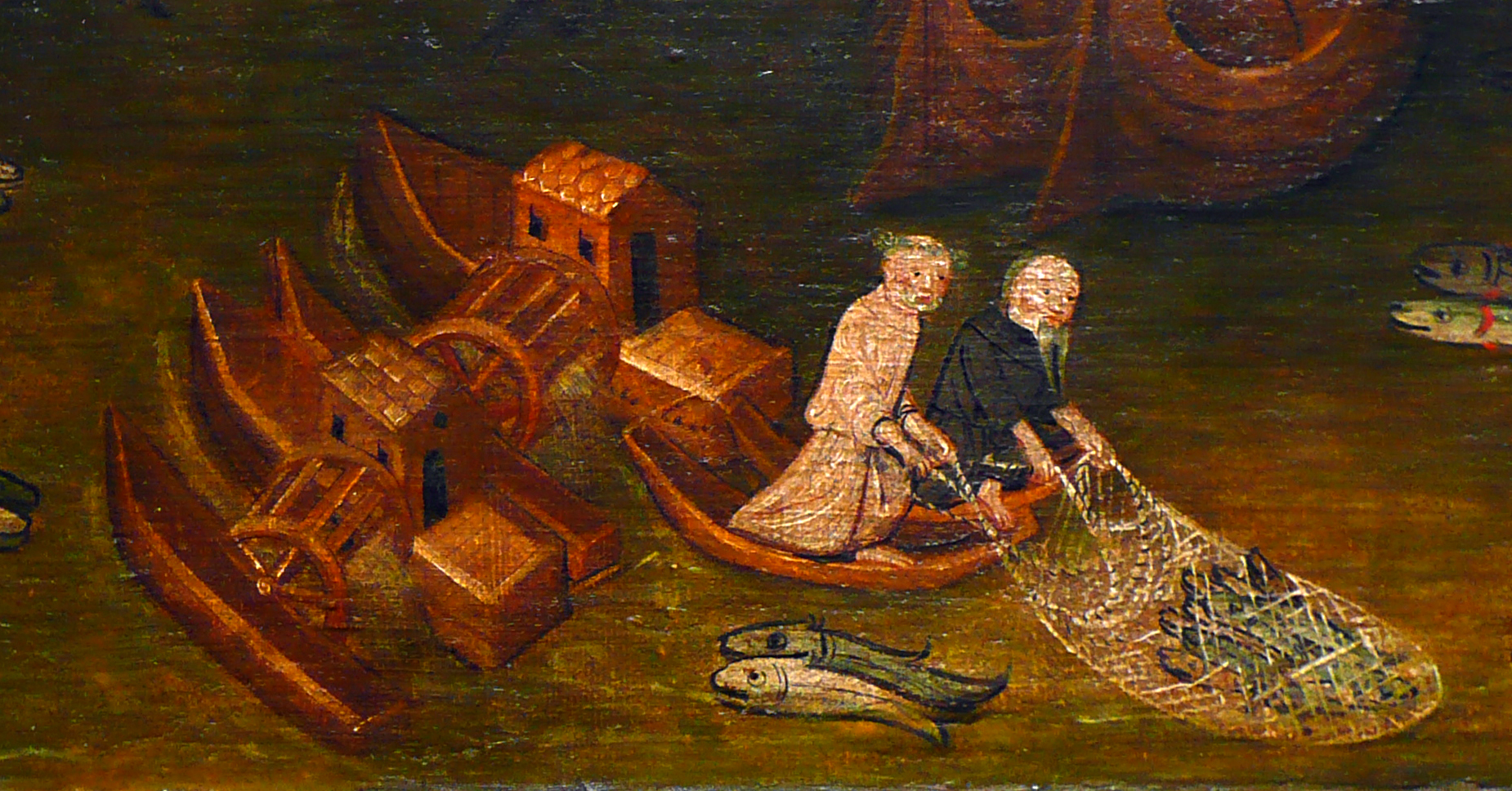
German ship mills on the Rhine at Cologne, around 1411

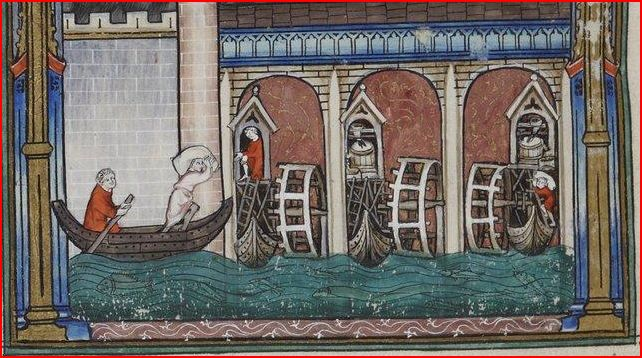
Ship mills under a bridge in Paris in the 1310s

Ship mills were used on most major rivers in Europe.

- Elbe - until 1911
- Rhine: Strasbourg and Mainz - 9th–12th centuries
- Danube: Regensburg - 1493 mentioned; Vienna at Kaisermühlen (Old Danube), or Orth an der Donau (in Lower Austria)
- Mur: Austria, Slovenia, Croatia and Hungary
- Weser: Minden - 1326 first mentioned
- Tiber: Rome
- Seine: Paris, near or under the bridges
- Marne, Garonne, Loire, in France, until 1850
- Kura: Tbilisi, since at least the 10th century until 1920-30s.
- Po: Mantua province from 851 until 1945.

== Tourism ==
There are some replicas of ship mills:

- working ship mill on the Weser river, in Minden (North Rhine-Westphalia, Germany,
- ship mill on the Mulde river, in Grimma-Höfgen, Saxony, Germany, in the hollow, since 1992 all year on the river, the water is pumped,
- working ship mill on the Danube, in Orth an der Donau, Austria,
- working ship mill on the Danube, in Ráckeve, Hungary,
- ship mill on the Mur river, in Mureck, Styria, Austria,
- ship mill on the Mur river, in Verzej, Slovenia
- ship mill on the Mur river, in Sveti Martin na Muri, Croatia.

There are also ship mills on land, as monuments:

- In Magdeburg (Germany), on the banks of the Elbe. There were once up to 23 pieces.
- In Bad Düben (Germany) in the castle grounds, there is the mountain ship mill, formerly with the grain as crushed.

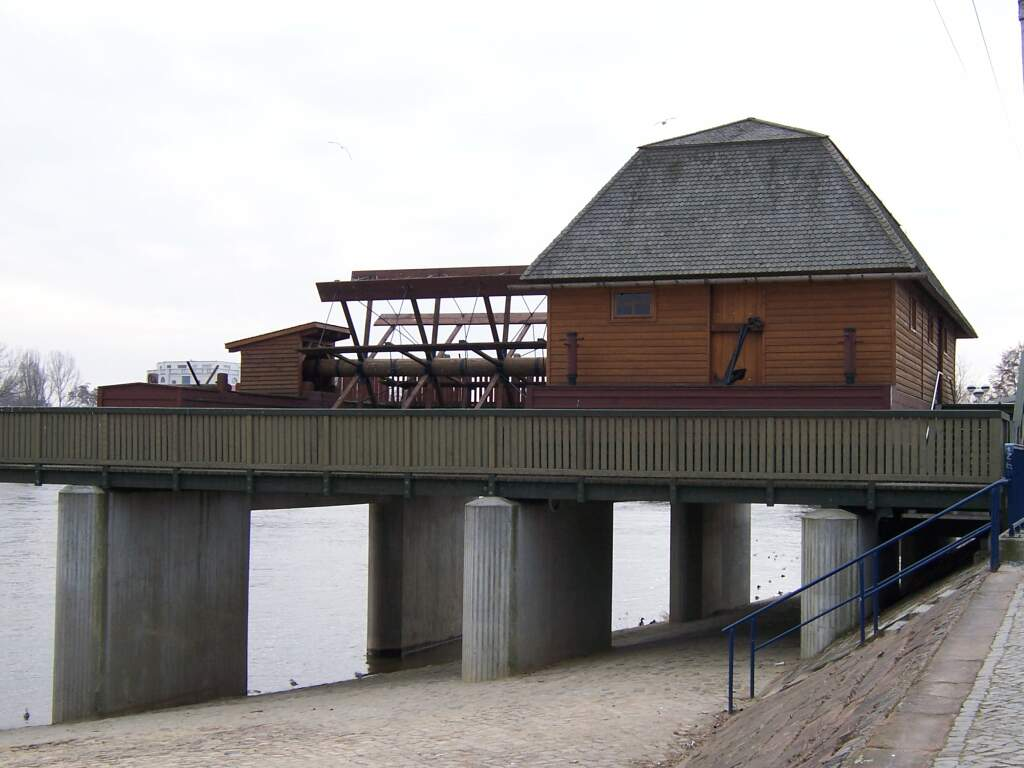
A ship mill in Magdeburg, Germany

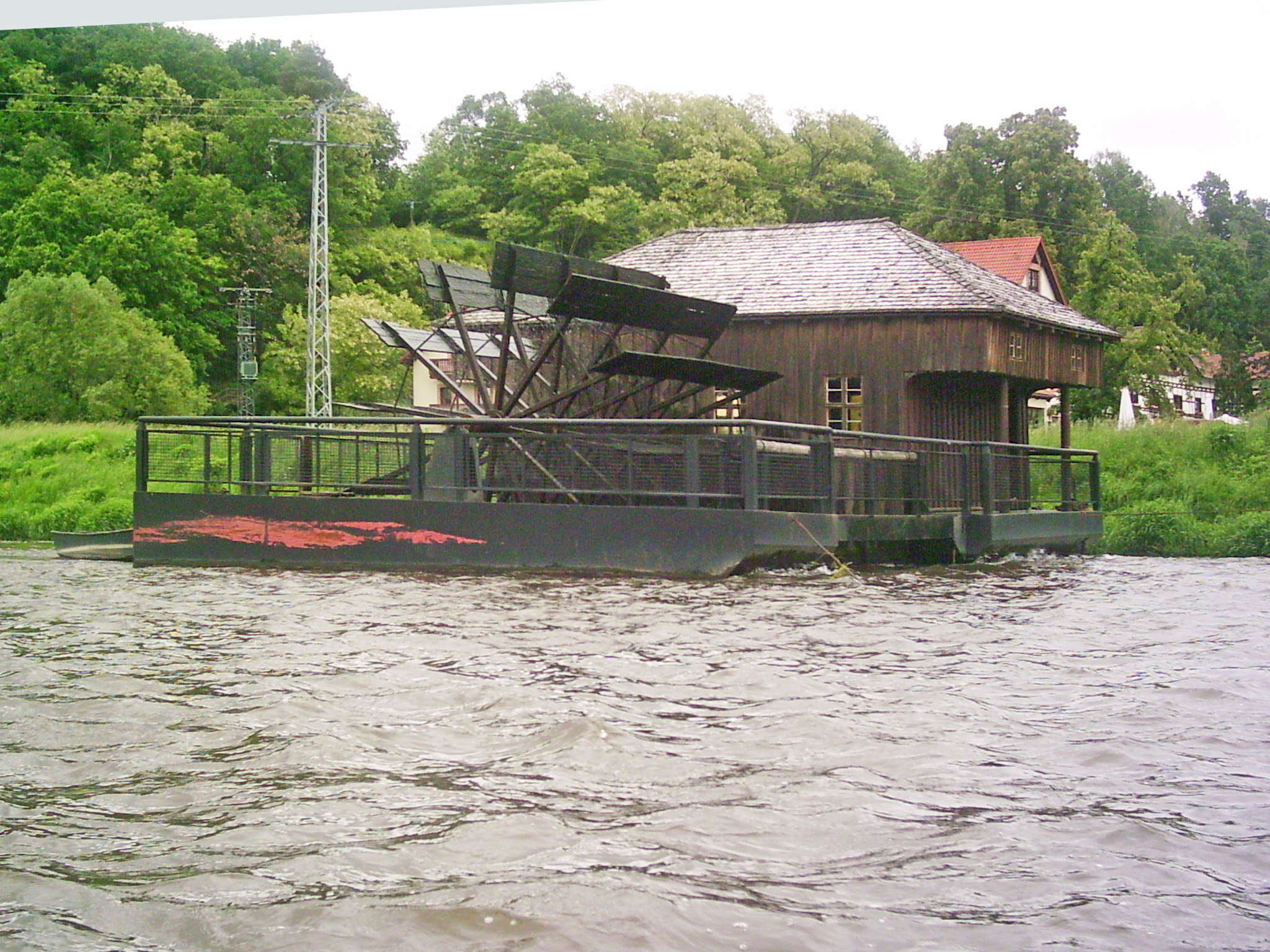
A ship mill in Höfgen at Grimma, Germany

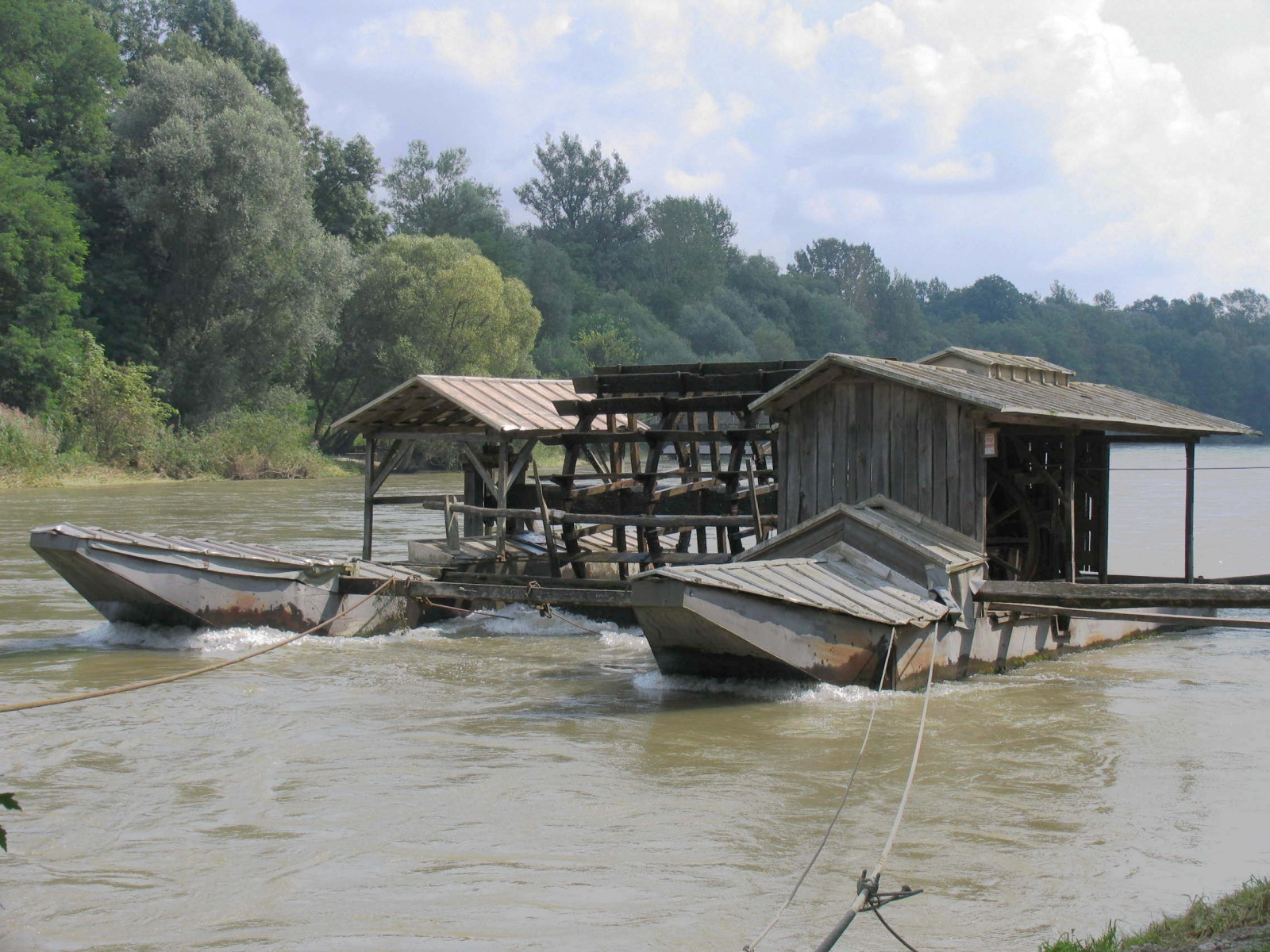
A ship mill on the Mur River near Verzej, Slovenia

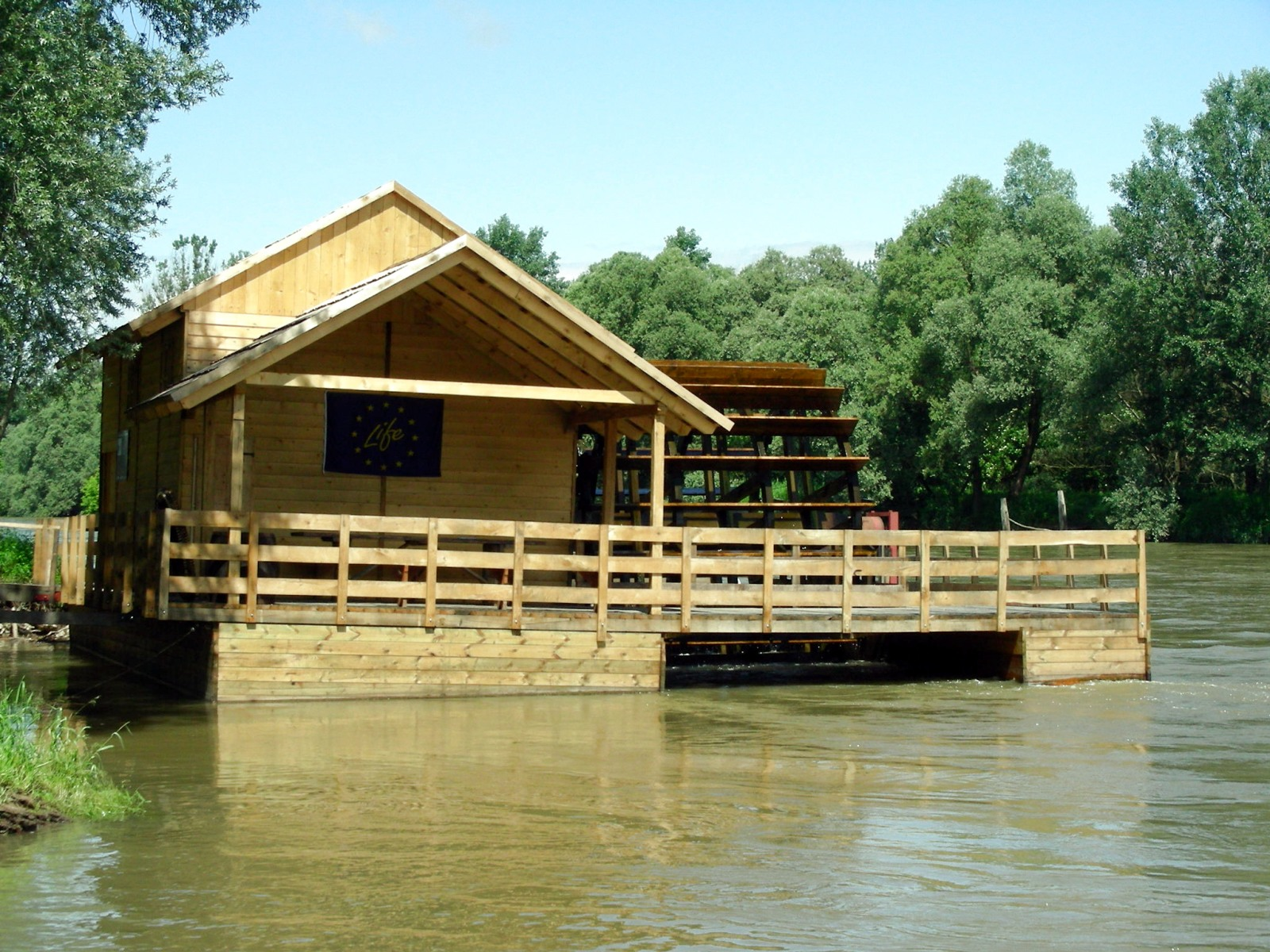
A ship mill replica on the Mur River at Mursko Središće, Croatia
