= Old Danube =

Oxbow lake in Vienna

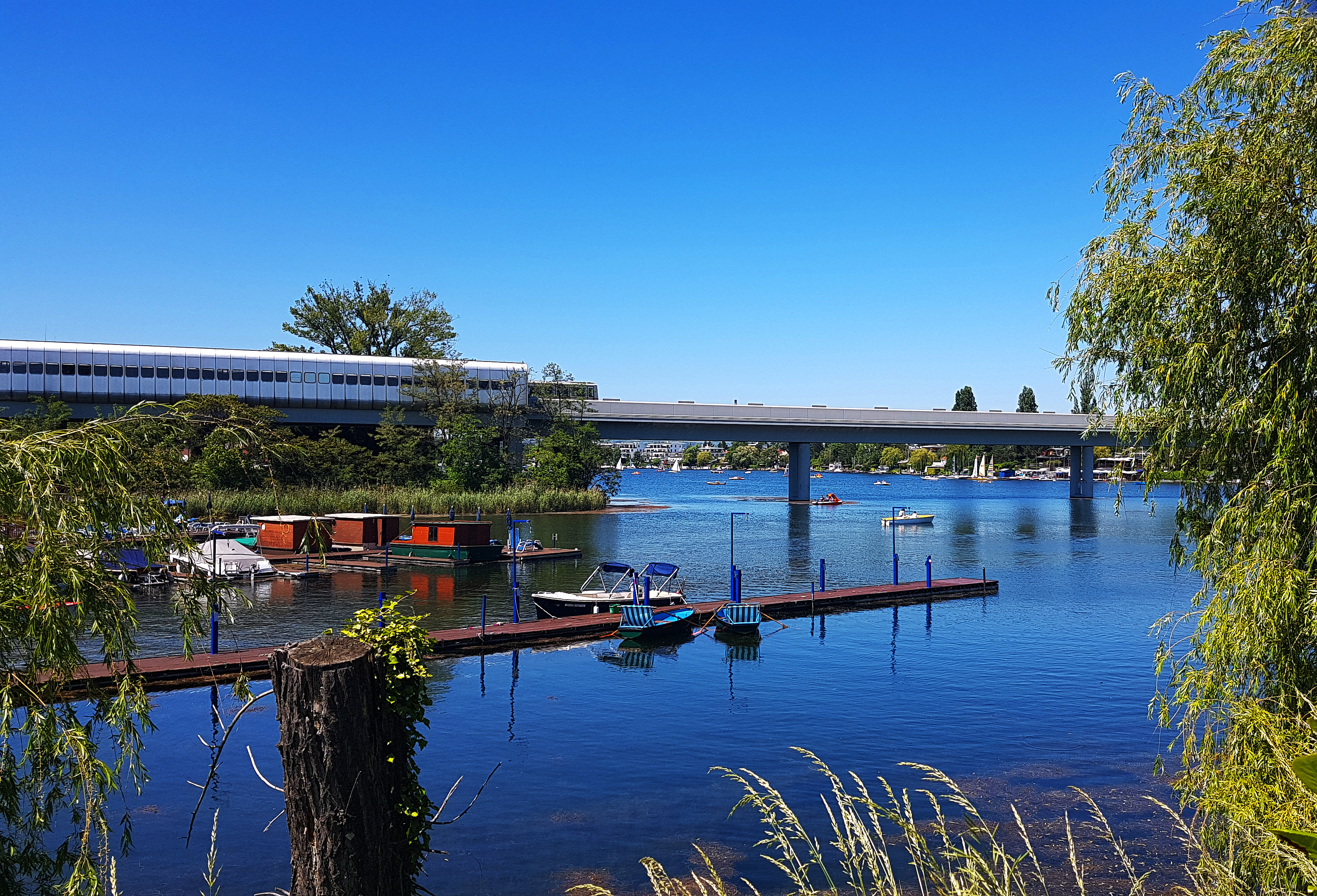
- The U1 crossing the Old Danube

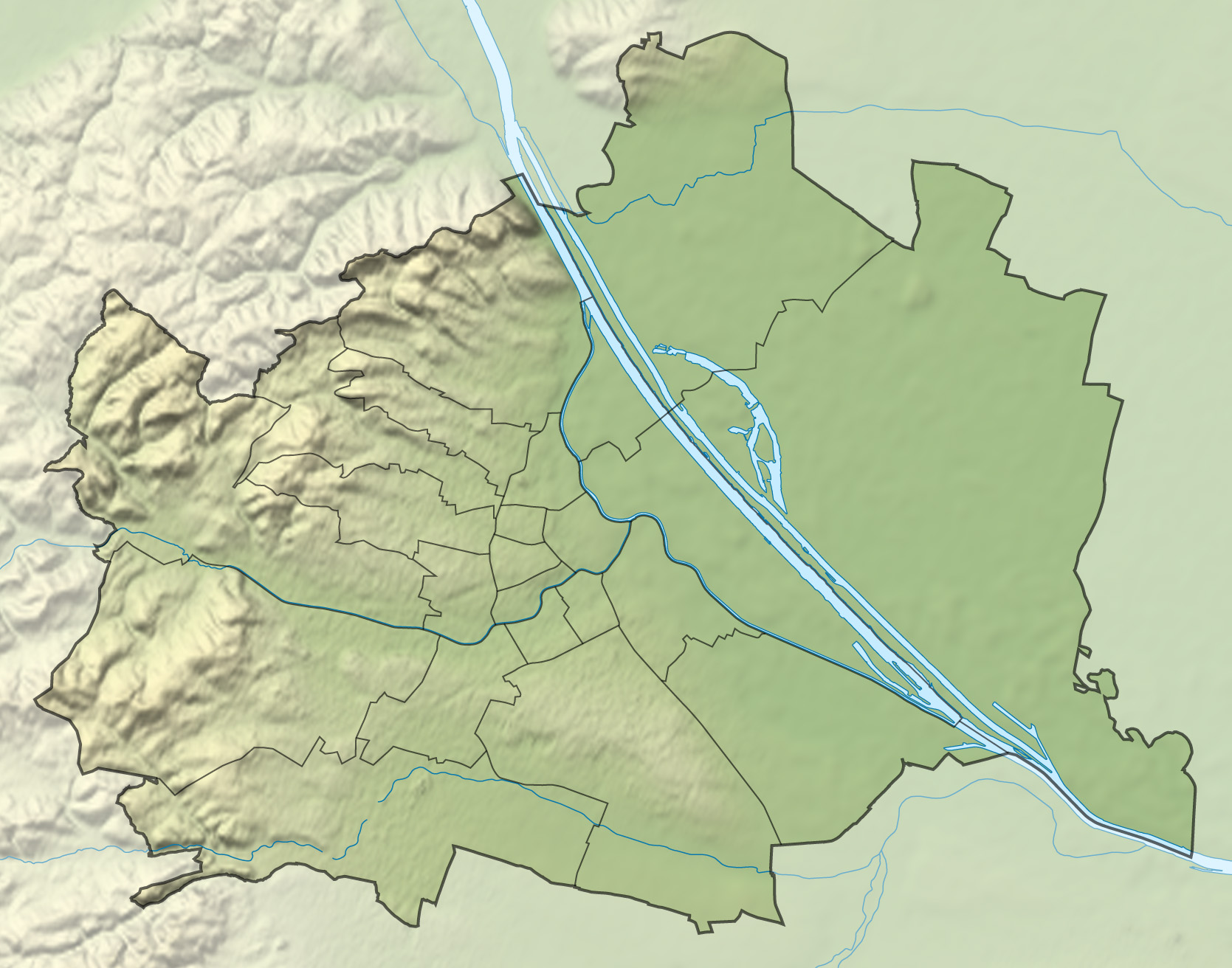
- Location within Vienna
- Location: Vienna
- Coordinates: 48°13′56″N 16°25′40″E
- Max. length: 5.2 km (3.2 mi)
- Max. width: 300 m (980 ft)
- Surface area: 1.6 km^{2} (0.62 sq mi)
- Average depth: 2.3 m (7 ft 7 in)
- Max. depth: 6.8 m (22 ft)
- Water volume: 3,700,000 m^{3} (130,000,000 cu ft)
- Website: wien.gv.at/english/environment/waterbodies/old-danube

The Old Danube (German: Alte Donau) is an oxbow lake of the Danube in Vienna, Austria. Situated northeast of the New Danube, it is a remnant of the river's former course, now separated from the main stream and the New Danube.

== History ==
The Danube in Vienna formerly branched into numerous arms and channels, forming a wide, untamed floodplain. The main stream frequently changed its course after floods, making the construction of permanent bridges impossible, as they were often destroyed during the frequent ice jams. In the early 18th century, after several devastating floods, the present-day Old Danube became the main branch of the Danube.

During the Danube regulation project (1870–1875), which aimed to provide flood protection, the Old Danube was separated from the newly excavated main stream. Since then, it has remained an inland water body with an area of approximately 1.6 km^{2} (0.62 sq mi) and an average depth of 2.5 m (8 ft 2 in) (maximum depth: 6.8 m (22 ft)). The Old Danube no longer receives direct inflow from the Danube and is primarily fed by groundwater. Historically, ship mills operated in the area of today's Old Danube. Additionally, the first Danube steamboat in Austria, the Franz I, was built on its banks, and the seaplanes of the Lohner-Werke were tested on its waters.

== Ecosystem ==
The Old Danube is home to a diverse ecosystem, with over 20 species of fish inhabiting its waters, including wels catfish, pike and zander. Above the surface live a variety of animal species, some of which are protected. These include waterbirds, such as the cormorant, and the protected European beaver.

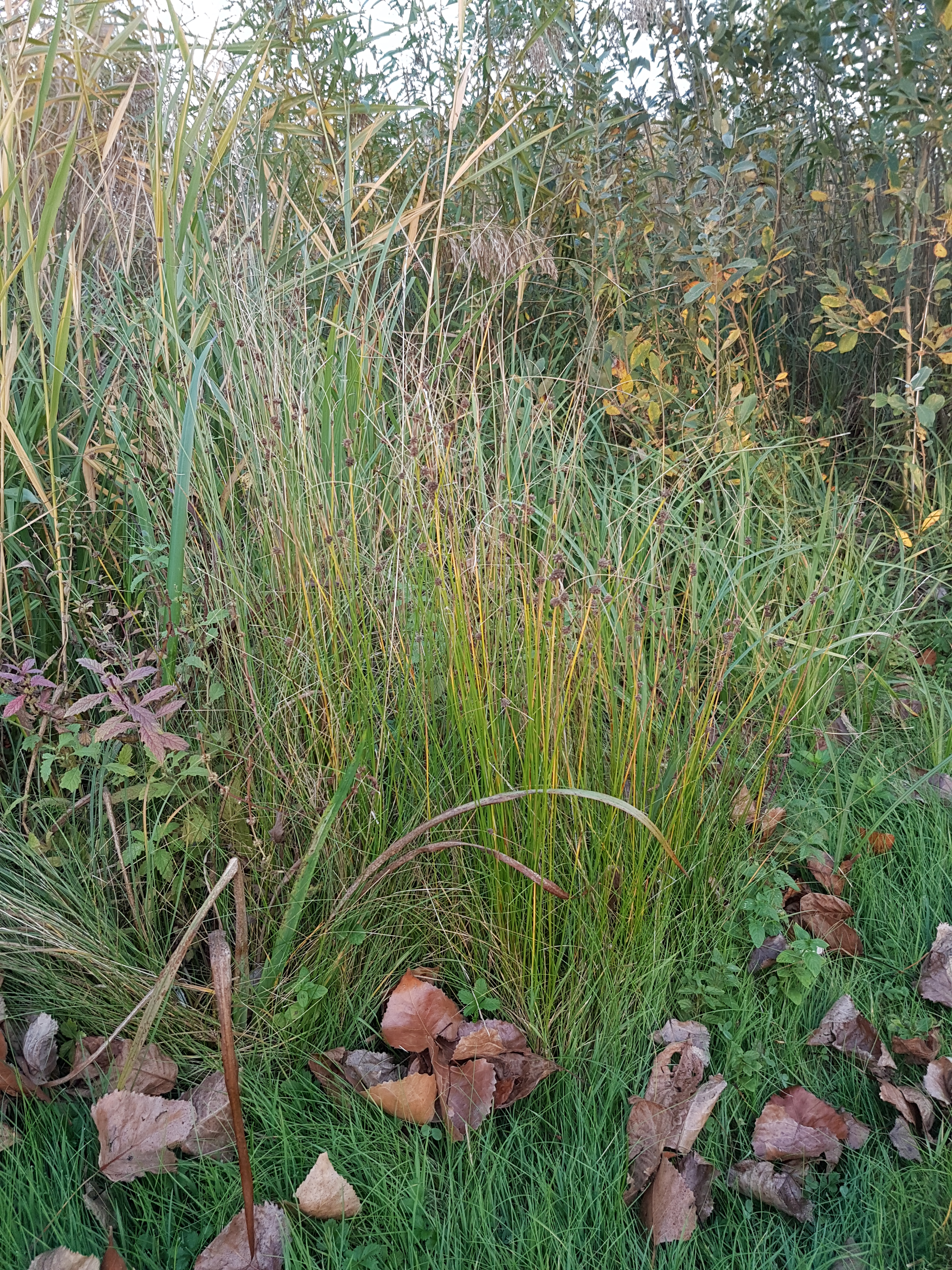
Roundhead bulrush on the eastern bank.

Conservation efforts to reintroduce endangered plant species have greatly improved the ecological diversity of the Old Danube. The banks are now characterized by the presence of yellow irises, flowering rushes, roundhead bulrushes and pond lilies. The reedbeds support approximately 45 plant species.

== Leisure ==
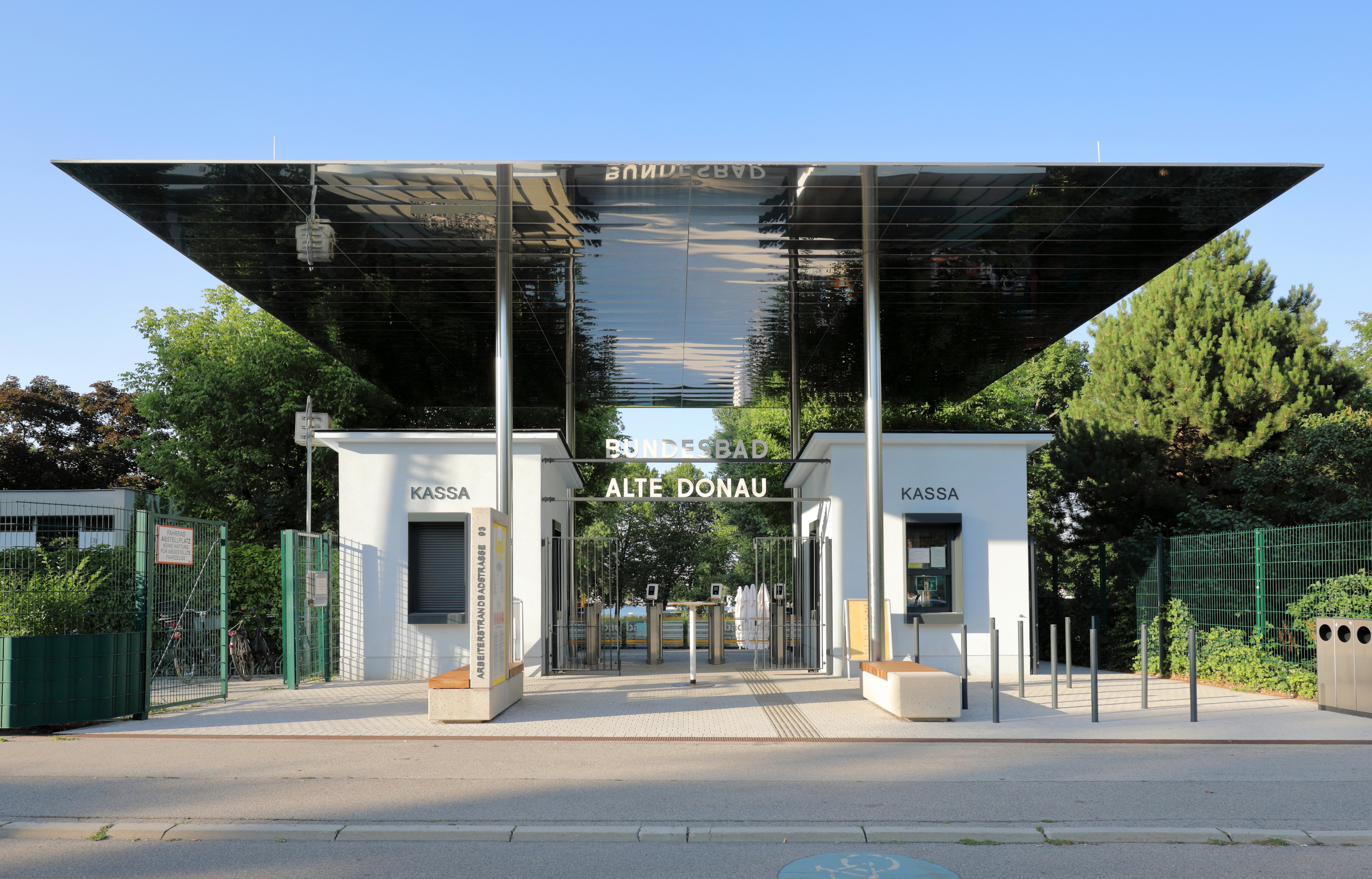
The Bundesbad Alte Donau.

Today, the Old Danube is a popular leisure and bathing area close to the city center, easily accessible via Vienna’s subway system. Several well-known public bathing areas are located along its banks, including the famous Gänsehäufel. Another notable bathing site is the Bundesbad Alte Donau, which covers an area of approximately 61,000 m^{2} (660,000 sq ft). Originally opened in 1919 as a military swimming school, it was made accessible to the public in the 1950s.

The eastern side of the lake features multiple public piers, platforms, rowing clubs and a few restaurants. The beaches are freely accessible; however, due to the lack of amenities like changing cabins, these facilities are primarily utilized by locals.

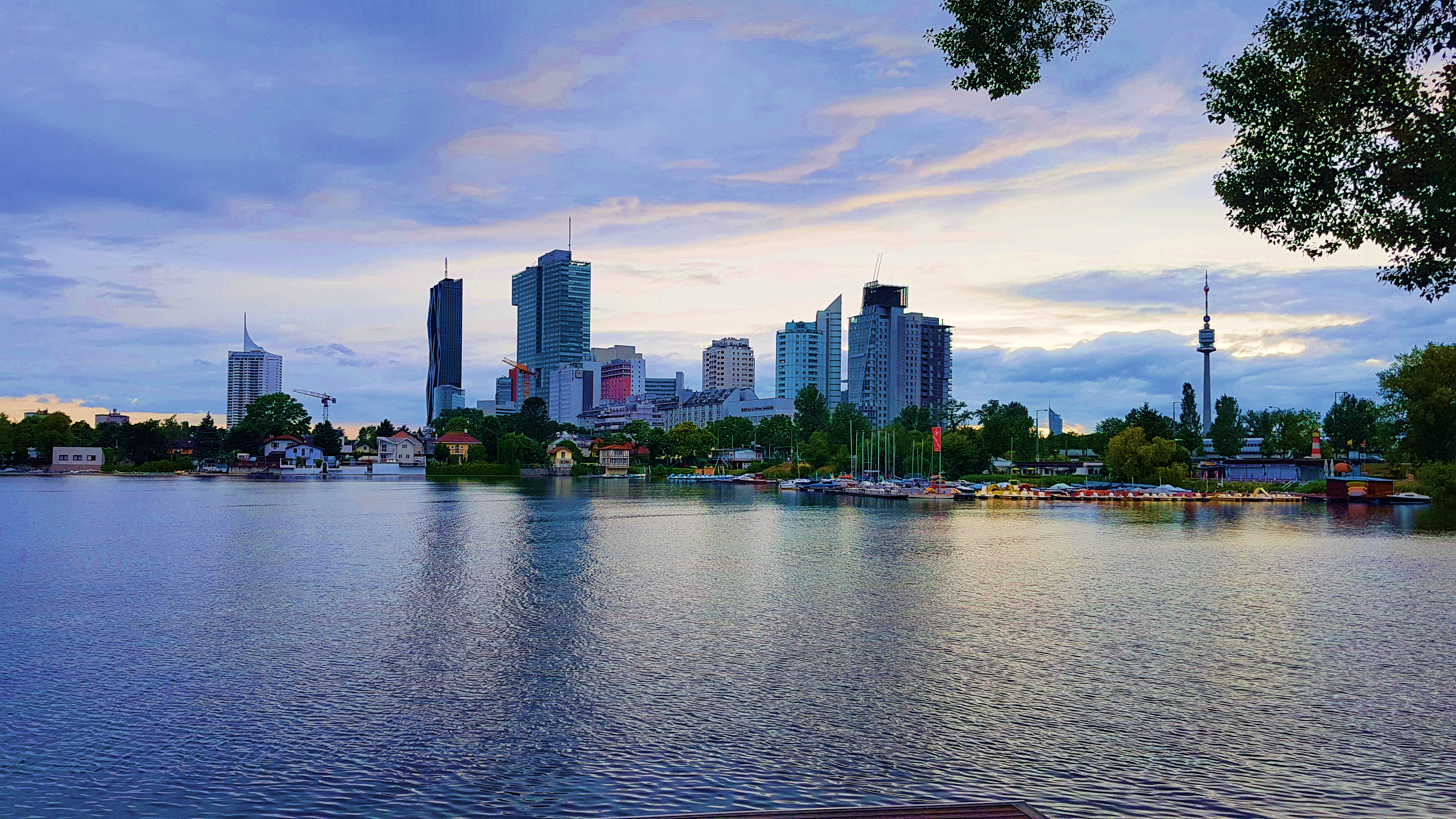
The Old Donau facing Donau City.

Visitors can rent rowing boats, sailing boats, pedalos, electric boats and surfboards. It is a good area for beginner sailors, although the surrounding high-rise buildings, such as those in Donau City and UNO-City, can create unpredictable winds.

Several rowing clubs and associations use the Old Danube for training, and in summer, events like rowing regattas, such as the Vienna Nightrow, take place on the lake.

In winter, the Old Danube can sometimes be used for ice skating, though caution is advised. The ice thickness is not officially monitored, and warm groundwater inflows can cause the ice to weaken or melt from below, even during prolonged cold weather.

== See also ==
A series of articles on regulation of the Danube in chronological order:

- Internationalization of the Danube River, for events from earliest times to the Treaty of Paris in 1856
- Commissions of the Danube River, for the international bodies governing the waterway from 1856 to 1940
- Nazi rule over the Danube River
- Danube River Conference of 1948
- Danube Commission, for events since 1948
- International Commission for the Protection of the Danube River, for the organization established in 1998 and charged with environmental and ecological activities
