= Parish church of Kainach bei Voitsberg =

Catholic church in Styria, Austria

Coordinates: 47°8′27″N 15°5′33″E

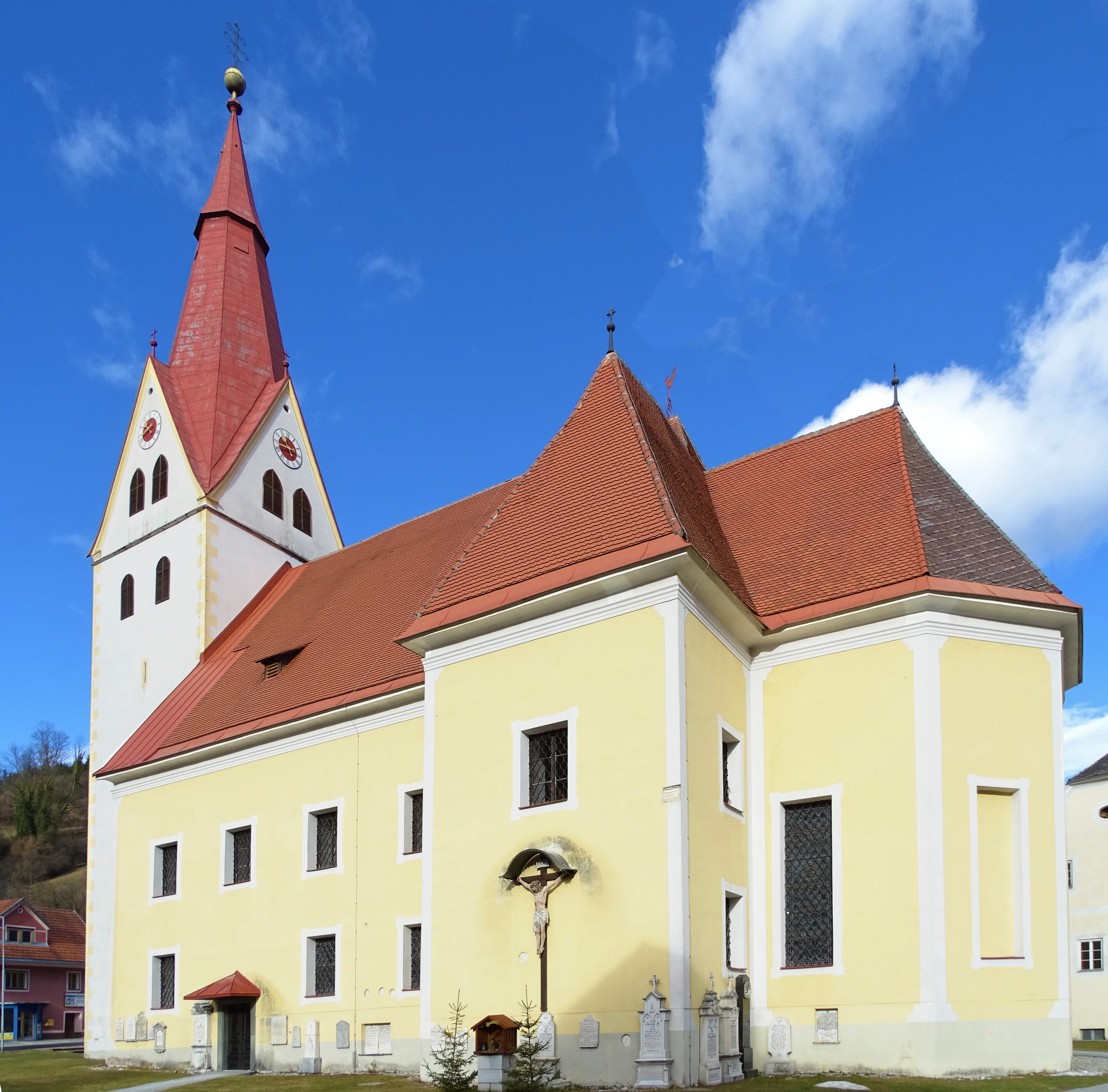
View from the south of the parish church of Kainach bei Voitsberg. The visible extension with the crucifix attached to the outer wall is the side chapel of the church.

The parish church of Kainach bei Voitsberg, often called Kainach parish church, is the Catholic parish church of the parish of Kainach, located in the municipality of Kainach bei Voitsberg in western Styria, Austria. The church, dedicated to St. George, belongs to the pastoral area of Voitsberg in the diocese of Graz-Seckau.

The origins of the church probably date back to the 11th century, when it was built as a filial church of the mother church of Piber and the St. Lambert's abbey. However, it is first mentioned in a document in 1245 in a listing of the branches of Piber. In the course of the 14th century Kainach developed into an independent parish. At the transition from the 15th to the 16th century there was a church fire, the exact extent of which is unknown. In the course of the 16th century the church was expanded and rebuilt, whether in the course of the fire is not clear. In the first half of the 18th century, the previous church was replaced by a new building, incorporating the remains of the previous building. Only the old church tower was preserved. In the course of the Josephinian reforms, the St. Lambert's abbey, to which the church had been incorporated until then, was dissolved in 1786. Since 1812 the diocese of Graz-Seckau has provided the parish priests in Kainach, and from 1973 to 2021 the parish was co-cared for by the Sisters of Charity of the Holy Cross.

The parish church of Kainach is a baroque gallery pillar church. It has a late Gothic steeple with a spire, which rises above the nave in the west. Around the church there are numerous gravestones, some of which are embedded in the church wall. They are the remains of the old cemetery, abandoned in 1900, and represent a regional historical testimony. All altars in the church were made in the 18th century in the workshop of Balthasar Prandtstätter. A special feature is the brick music matroneum, into which a wooden gallery, the so-called Schmiedenchor or Schmiedenkotter, was inserted at the base of the vault at the request of the Kainach scythe smiths in the 18th century.

The entire structure, along with the remains of the former cemetery, is a listed building.

== Location ==
The church stands centrally in the village of Kainach near Voitsberg, at an altitude of about 545 meters above sea level, on the western bank of the Kainach River. About 100 meters east of the church runs the L 341, the Kainacherstraße. The Dorfstraße, which branches off from the L 341, leads directly past the church. Northeast of the church is the rectory, which shares its address Kainach No. 1 with the parish church. The parish cemetery is located a good 400 meters north of the church on the L 341.

== History ==
=== Origins and the mother church of Piber ===
The upper Kainach valley and thus also the area around today's church and the village of Kainach were part of the donation of 100 hectares of arable land as well as further forest and pasture areas by Emperor Otto III to Margrave Adalbero of Eppenstein on April 13, 1000. As a result of this donation, about two thirds of the present-day area of the Voitsberg district came into the possession of the Eppensteins, who were thus able to connect their possessions in Upper Styria with their Hengistburg near Wildon. The first settlement center in the area of the donation was the village of Piber, which, in addition to the so-called Biburg, a fortification, also had a church. This church in Piber was granted full parish rights in 1063 as part of a tithe settlement between Count Markwart IV and Archbishop Gebhard of Salzburg, making Piber the mother parish of the Voitsberg district. The parish of Piber thus also included the area of Kainach. The last of the Eppensteins, Count Henry III, donated the parish of Piber in 1103 as an endowment to the St. Lambert's abbey, which had been newly founded by his father Markwart IV. This donation was confirmed by Emperor Frederick I in Friesach on March 3, 1170.

The St. Lambert's abbey promoted settlement in the parish area of Piber by clearing the forests, founding villages and building castles and churches. Thus, a first Romanesque church may have been built in Kainach as early as the 11th century by St. Lambert's abbey and the mother church of Piber.

=== From the foundation of the church to the 17th century ===
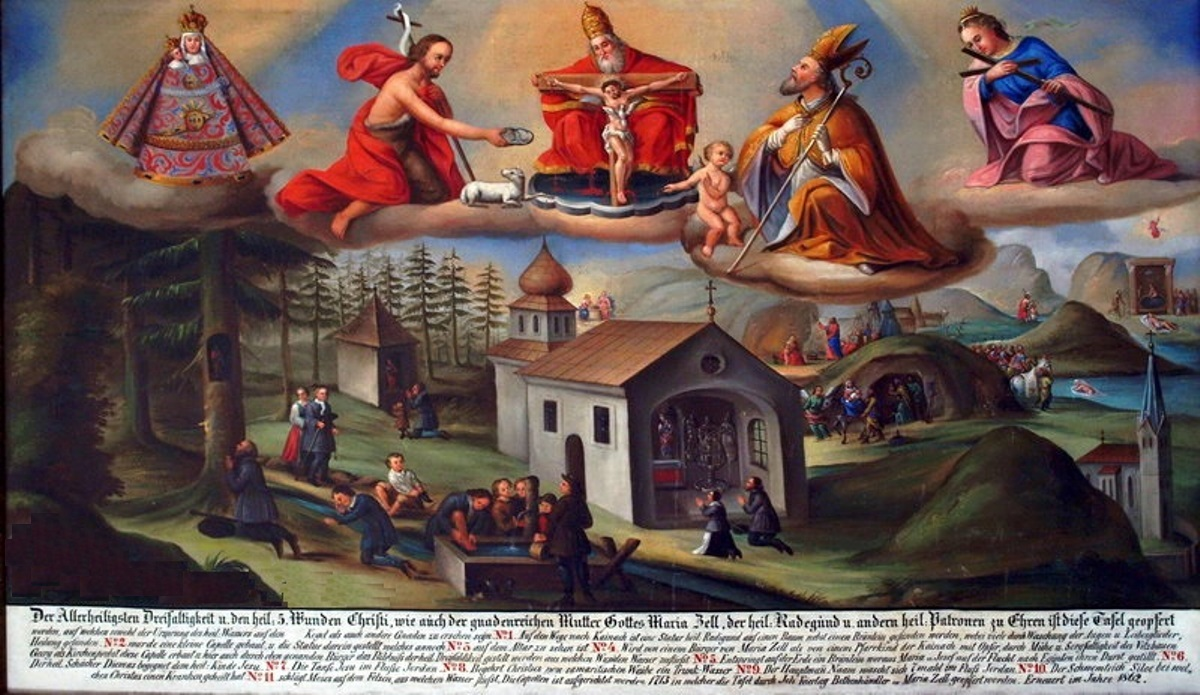
This picture, painted in 1713, hangs in the filial church of St. Radegund am heiligen Wasser and shows a church on the lower right edge, which is presumably the Kainach parish church before its new construction in the 18th century.

Duke Leopold VI granted various rights to the church of Piber, which were listed and confirmed by Witiko, the country scribe, in a document on January 12, 1245. This document also lists the nine filial churches of the parish at that time, including the one in Kainach. This document is thus the first written mention of this church, which at that time also held the tavern right, which meant that an inn could be operated next to the church. The advocacy of St. George also suggests an early church foundation. As a branch, priests and chaplains were stationed in the Kainach church from the mother church in Piber, who were responsible for the pastoral care of the local population. In the course of time, however, the branches developed more and more into independent parishes with delimited areas of influence and also their own revenues. The first named clergyman in Kainach was the vicar Wolffhart Khissegkher mentioned in 1321. A clergy house is mentioned for the first time in 1391. The first known parish priest of Kainach was Heinrich, documented in 1413, who later became parish priest in Köflach and Meier of Piber. According to a tradition, a new church building was completed in 1422, of which the steeple has survived into modern times.

Probably towards the end of the 15th or at the beginning of the 16th century there was a fire in the church, from which only the church tower was spared. The church fire itself is mentioned only in a canonical visitation from 1544, but without specifying when it occurred. There are reports that the parish priest Hans Mauerschwanger began construction of the church tower during his tenure, which lasted from 1504 to 1531/32, and was continued by Urban Gutmann, parish priest from 1533 to 1557, before it was completed under Petrus Steindorfer, parish priest from 1574 to 1585, in 1587. However, Romanesque and Gothic plaster remains found in the tower in 2004 during an interior renovation suggest that the tower is older and was only rebuilt, expanded or restored at that time. It is unclear whether this construction work is related to the church fire. At the same time as the tower, the rest of the church was also rebuilt and extended. The same record that mentions the church fire gives an overview of the church inventory from that time, which included four gilded chalices and eight good regalia, which were damaged .

In 1602, an act of blood desecrated both the church and the cemetery surrounding it. A reconciliation, a restoration of the consecration, took place in the same year by Bishop Martin Brenner, who at the same time consecrated two new church bells. In 1608 Brenner criticized the handling of confession in Kainach, which was taken in public, and demanded the installation of confessionals. During his visitation in 1641, Abbot Benedikt Pierin of Lambert criticized the lack of a tower clock and the partially torn church flags. Furthermore, he ordered the removal of the old stalls so that the tombstones embedded in the floor of the church, which may have been of benefactors or of priests, would be more visible. The same report also mentions two newly erected altars. A new organ was installed in 1703. The sacristy was added to the nave between 1707 and 1716. A large, no longer extant, image of St. Christopher on the exterior wall above the church doorway was badly weathered by 1719 and was either restored or painted over.

A picture painted in 1713 and hanging in the Filial church of St. Radegund am heiligen Wasser shows, next to the founding legend of the church there, on the lower right edge of the picture, a church that presumably represents the parish church of Kainach at the beginning of the 18th century, and thus before the new building.

=== New construction of the church in the 18th century ===
At the beginning of the 18th century, during the tenure of Anton Stroz, Abbot of Lambert, the church, which had been rebuilt in the 16th century, was largely demolished and replaced between 1722 and 1725 by a new baroque building incorporating parts of the old church. Only the old church tower and the sacristy, built a few years earlier, were preserved. The parish register from the time of the new building lists an Architectorista, i.e. an architect or master builder named Jo(h)annes Joseph de Mäntzenberg, as the father of the baptized child at a baptism, although it is unclear whether he had anything to do with the new construction of the church. The burial of the journeyman sculptor Johann Grabmayr, son of the sculptor Andreas Grabmayr, who among other things made the pulpit in the church of Mariazell, is also recorded in the church records from this time. Here it is also unclear whether Grabmayr had anything to do with the construction site and, if so, what he was working on. However, it is likely that the pulpit was Grabmayr's work.

The majority of the construction costs were borne by the St. Lambert's abbey, which held the right of patronage at that time, but the citizens of Kainach Johann and Vitus Feiertag also appeared as major sponsors. Johann Feiertag alone, who was active in Mariazell as a dealer in pilgrimage souvenirs and had already supported the construction of the Filial church of St. Radegund am heiligen Wasser, donated a total of 2089 gulden for the new building between 1721 and 1724. In return, after his death or that of his sister Gertraud, two annual masses were to be said for her for 90 years. As can be seen from two visitation reports from the years 1740 and 1751, however, not a single one of the promised masses was said for the two deceased. After the new building was completed and a large part of the interior furnishings, such as the altars and the pulpit, were in the church, the consecration of the church took place on May 29, 1729. It was performed by the Bishop of Seckau, Jakob Ernst von Liechtenstein-Kastelkorn, at the invitation of the Abbot of Lambert, Kilian Werlein, who also consecrated the four altars of the church. In a contract dated November 25, 1741, the then parish priest Karlmann Löfflerau commissioned the master carpenter Zacharias Stainacher, who came from Köflach, to remodel and embellish the high altar.

=== Period of Josephinian reforms and the 19th century ===
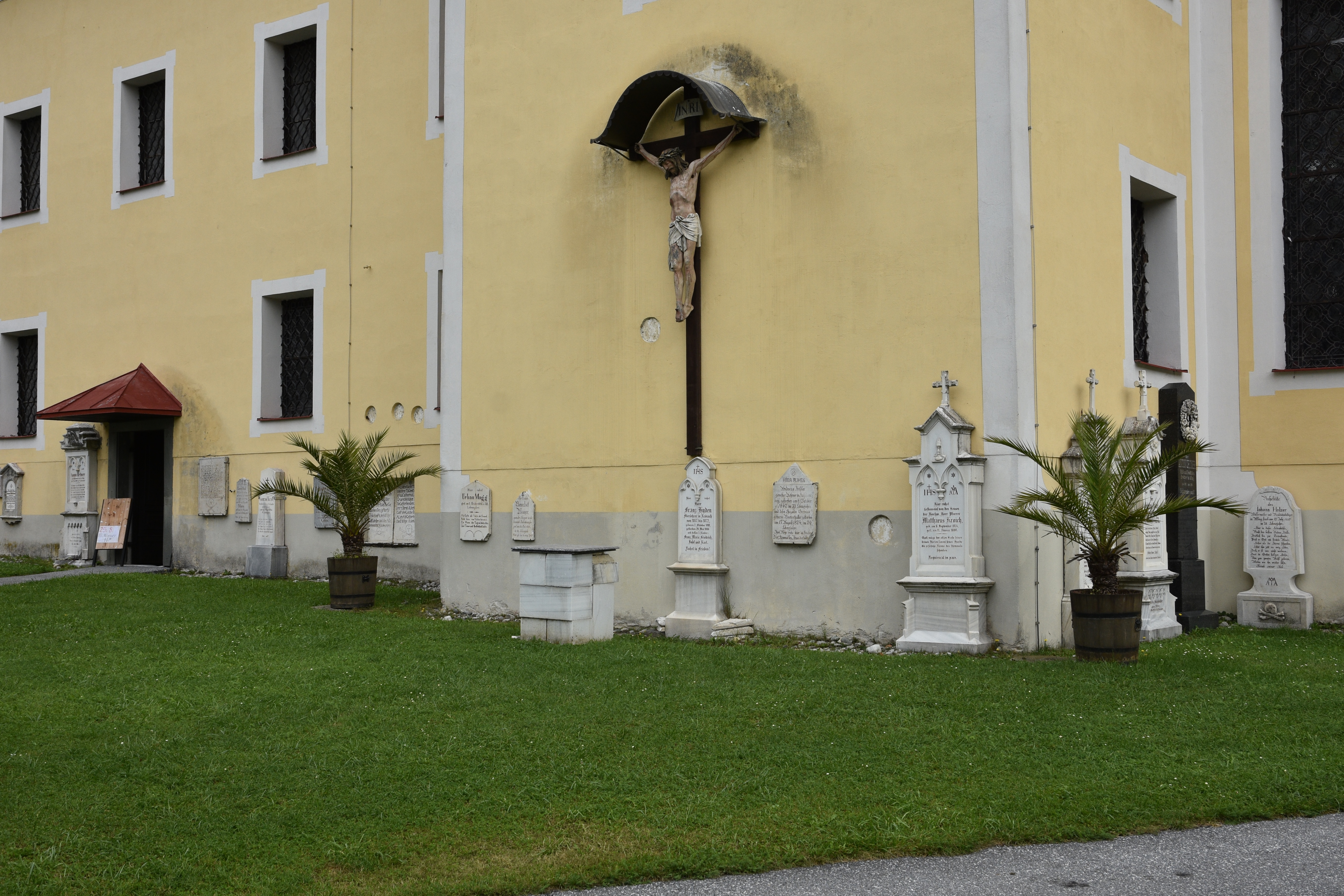
Around the church numerous gravestones remind of the cemetery located here until 1900

In the course of the church reforms implemented by Emperor Joseph II, known as Josephinism, processions and other customs such as the blessing of food known as the consecration of meat were abolished. These reforms and regulations demanded that social customs submit to state supervision following the principles of enlightened absolutism. Monasteries, which Joseph II considered a haven of superstition and religious fanaticism, were dissolved, simpler worship was ordered, superfluous altars in churches were removed, and churches deemed surplus to requirements were profaned and demolished. The St. Lambert's abbey, to which the parish church had been incorporated until then, was also dissolved in the course of these reforms on January 4, 1786. Emperor Franz II reversed the abolition of the monastery in 1802, but the mother parish and dominion of Piber and thus at the same time the parish of Kainach were no longer placed under his patronage. The last priest of the monastery, however, was still active in the parish of Kainach until 1812; he was succeeded by priests provided by the diocese of Graz-Seckau.

In 1849/50 and 1890 restoration works were carried out in the interior and in 1893 the paving of the church was started. In the 19th century, the previous roof of the church tower was also replaced by a spire. Since the cemetery around the church was overcrowded, in 1896 the subdivision of a new cemetery located outside the village was started, which replaced the previous cemetery on 1 January 1900.

=== 20th century to the present ===
In the spring of 1946, a storm covered the roof area above the high altar, the sacristy and the chapel of the cross, as well as the roof ridges. However, the damage could not be repaired until 1949, when the necessary roof tiles could be obtained in exchange for a shipment of wood. In the same year the organ was rebuilt. As part of the electrification of the village of Kainach, which was carried out in 1951, the church and the rectory were also connected to the local power grid. Another storm destroyed the top of the church tower in 1959, tearing down the cross and the steeple ball. With the help of the population, a renovation of the interior took place in 1967, as well as a modernization and re-roofing of the parsonage in 1969.

In 1973, at the request of Bishop Johann Weber, two Sisters of Charity of the Holy Cross, Chiara Wiltsche and Lima Gasperl, came to Kainach to care for the parish. In the following decades, extensive renovation work was carried out on the church, which was largely paid for from the parish's own funds. Thus, as early as 1974/75, an extensive exterior renovation took place, including the installation of a new tower clock. A newly acquired third church bell was consecrated on September 17, 1978. The church windows were restored in 1980 and new pews were installed. Renovation of the high altar took place in 1985.

During a major interior restoration in 2004, Romanesque and Gothic plaster remains were found in the church tower. Auxiliary Bishop Franz Lackner consecrated the new people's altar on October 17, 2004. Sisters of Charity of the Holy Cross, Chiara Wiltsche, left the parish of Kainach in 2011 for health reasons.

Since the altars, the pews as well as the choir stalls were infested with common furniture beetle, the entire interior of the church was fumigated in August 2017 to combat the pest infestation. With Lima Gasperl, the last of the two Sisters of Charity of the Holy Cross working in Kainach left the parish in 2021.

== Architecture ==
The baroque three-nave gallery-pier church has a cruciform ground plan and is oriented to the east. The

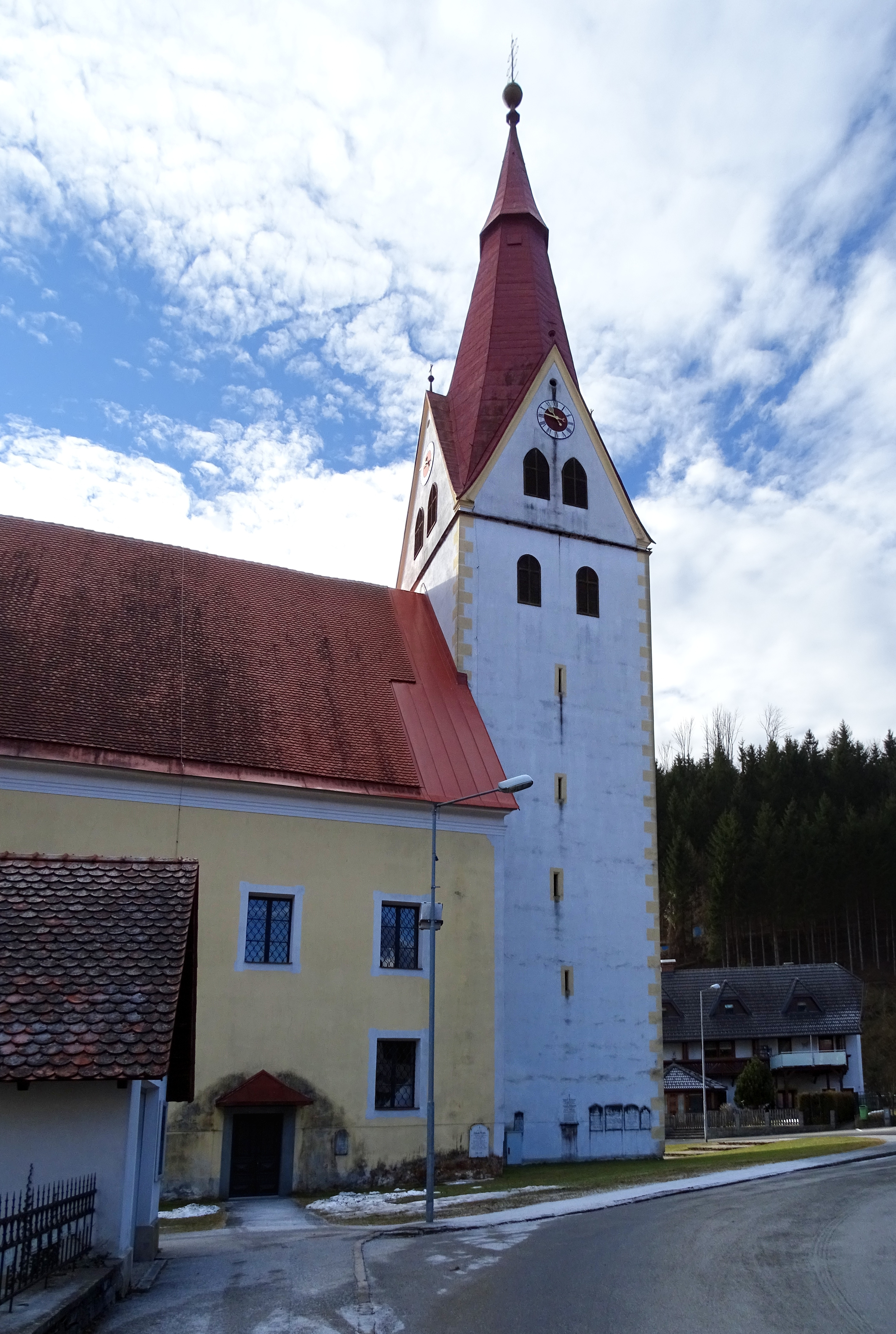
North side of the church

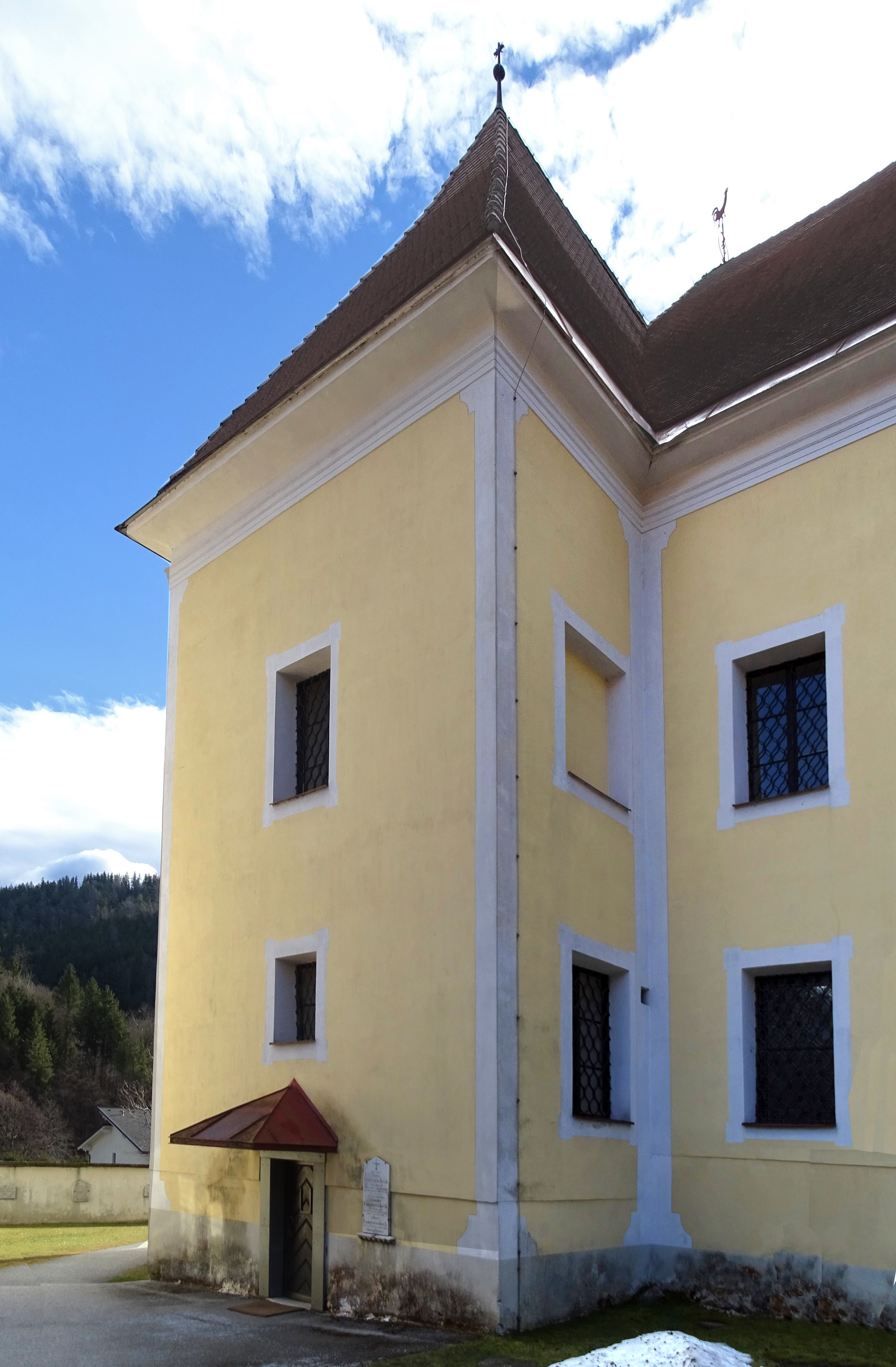
Sacristy attached to the north side

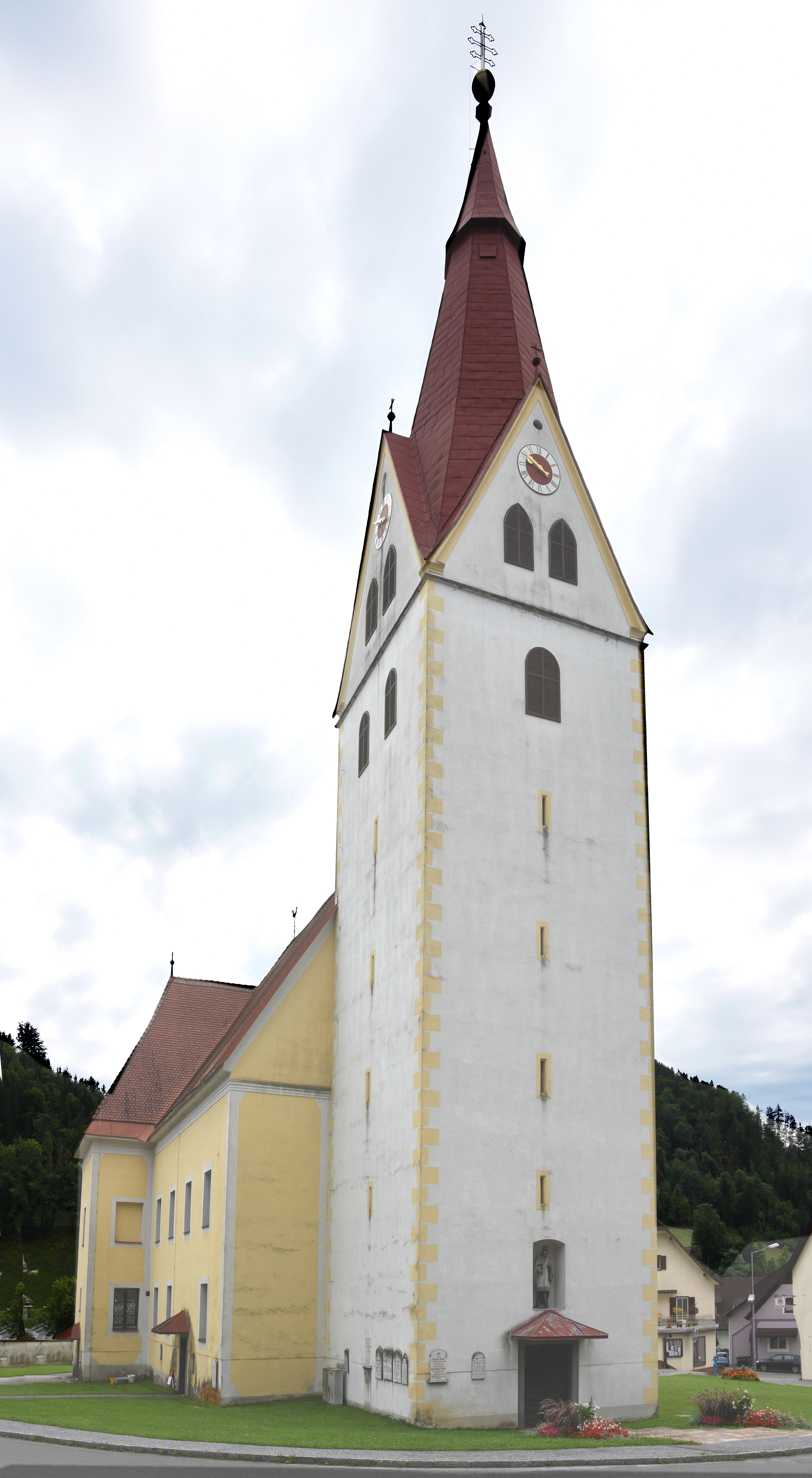
View from the northwest of the north and west sides of the church with the late Gothic steeple

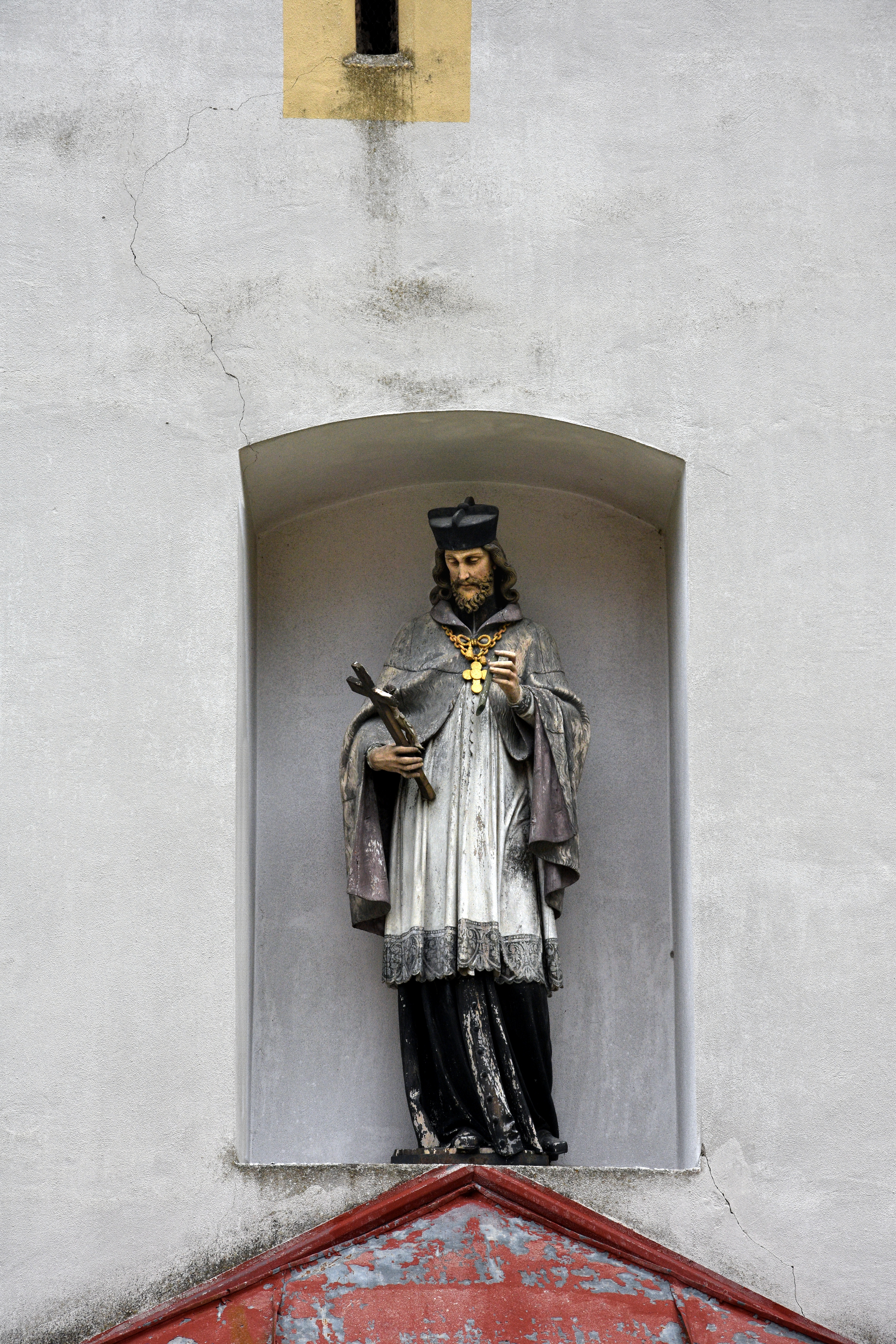
Nepomuk statue above the tower portal

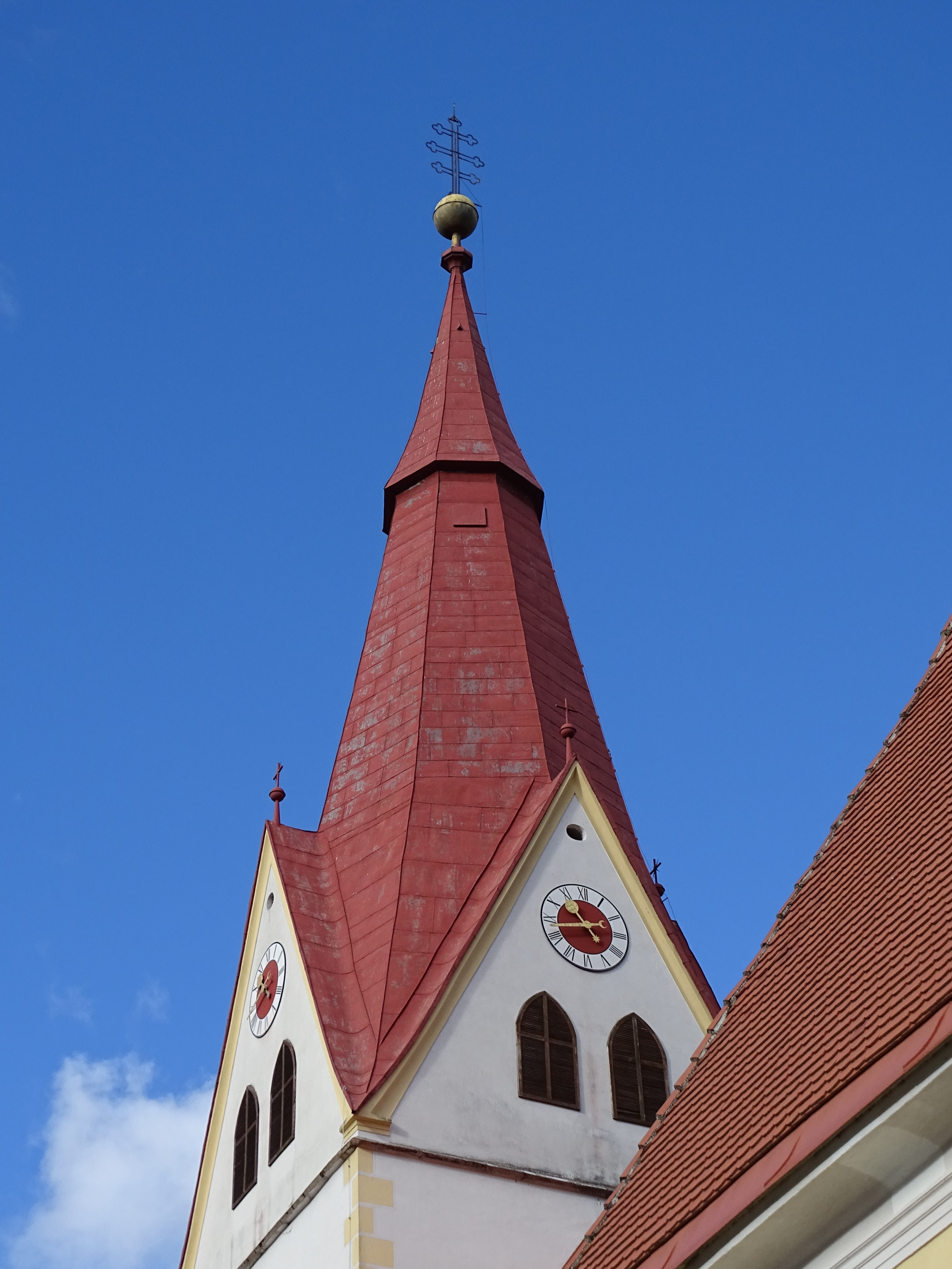
Spire of the church tower

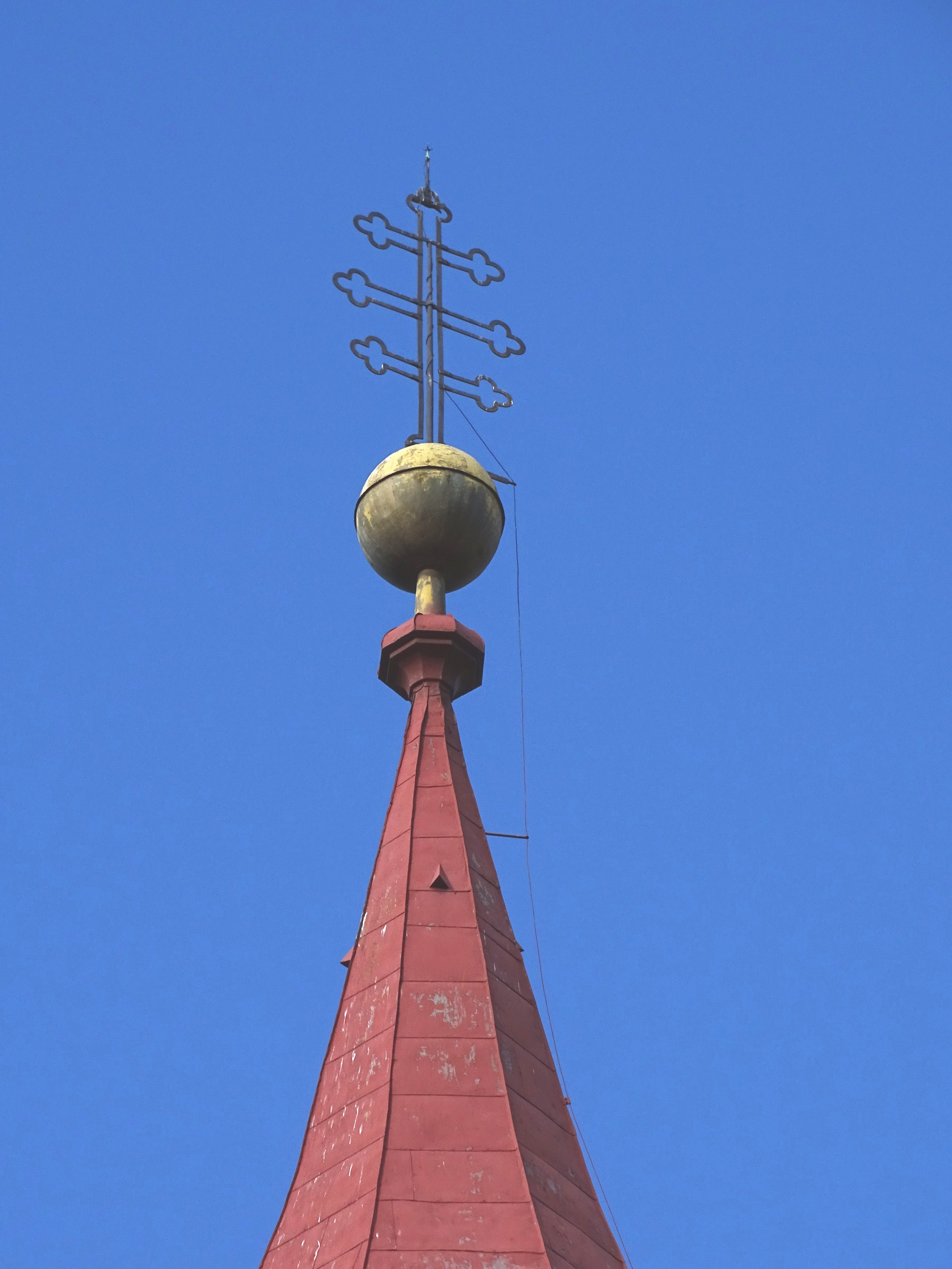
Steeple ball and three-bar cross on the spire of the church tower

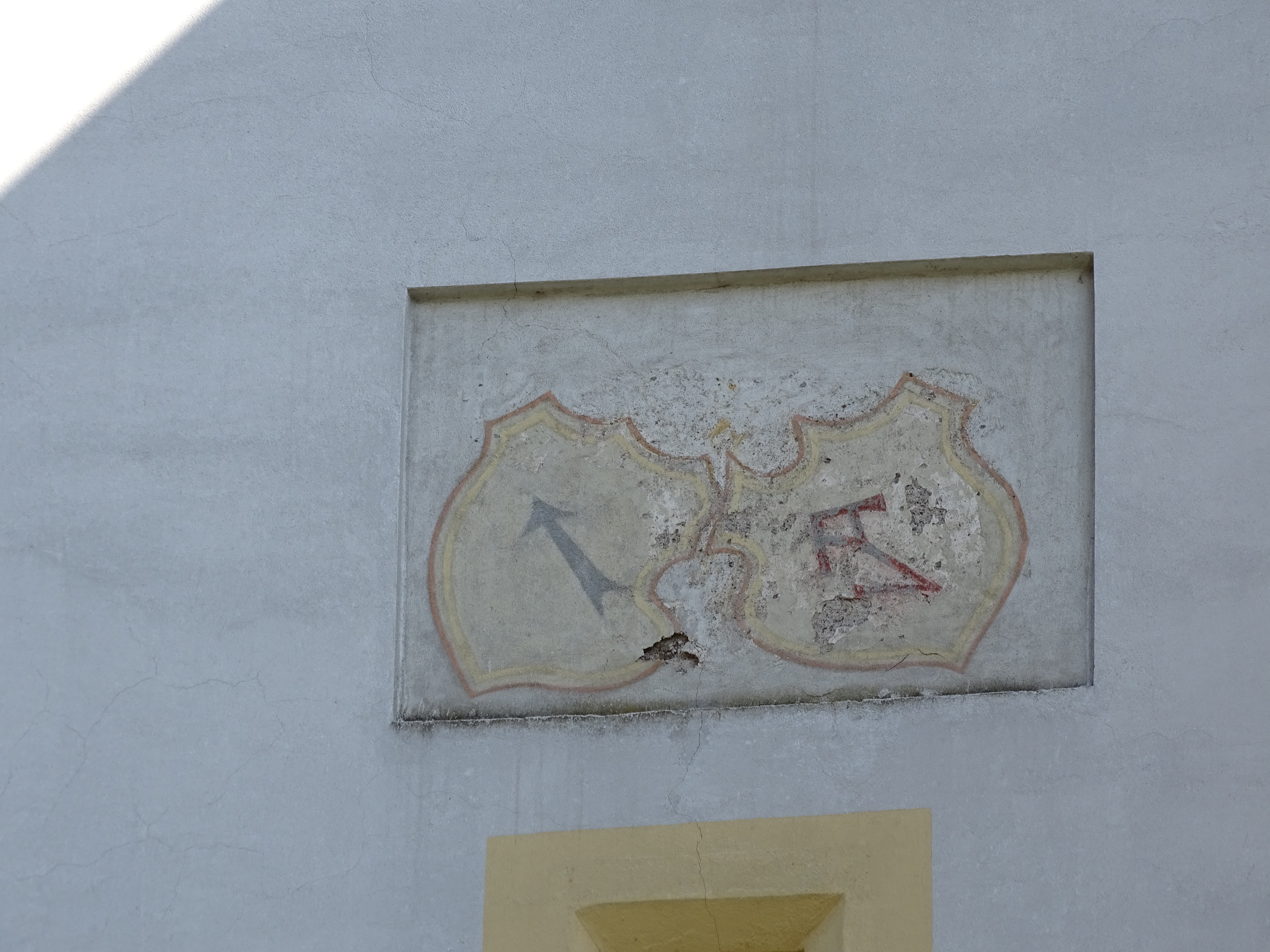
Painted blazons on the southern wall of the church tower

cruciform ground plan is created by the sacristy attached to the north and the side chapel attached to the south. In this respect, the architecture of the church of Kainach resembles that of the filial church of Sankt Blasen, which was built in the same period and was also subordinated to the St. Lambert's abbey, while in its ground plan there is a similarity with the Mariazell Basilica.

=== Exterior description ===
The exterior walls of the church are simple and are divided by painted window frames and corner lesene. The

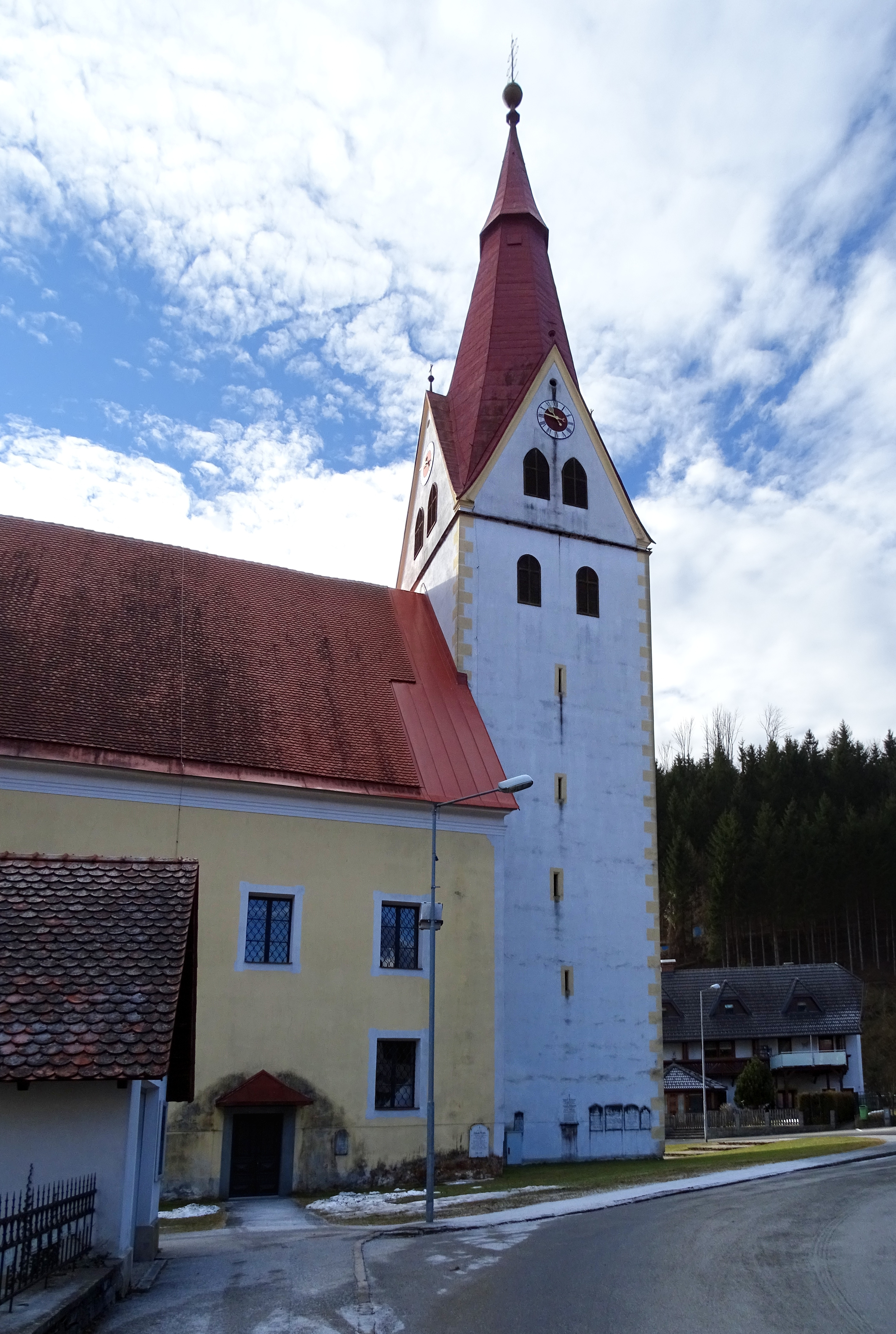
North side of the church

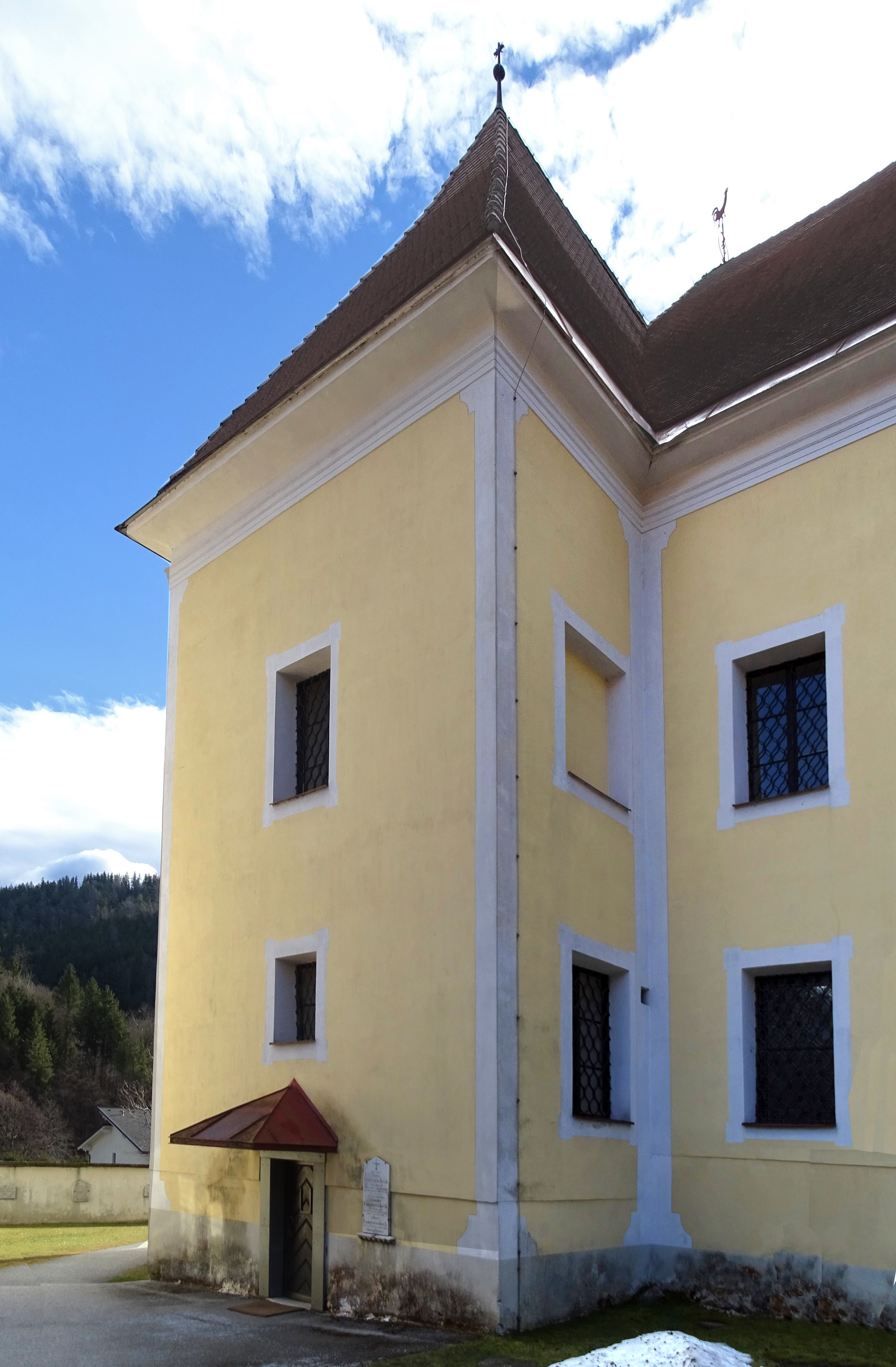
Sacristy attached to the north side

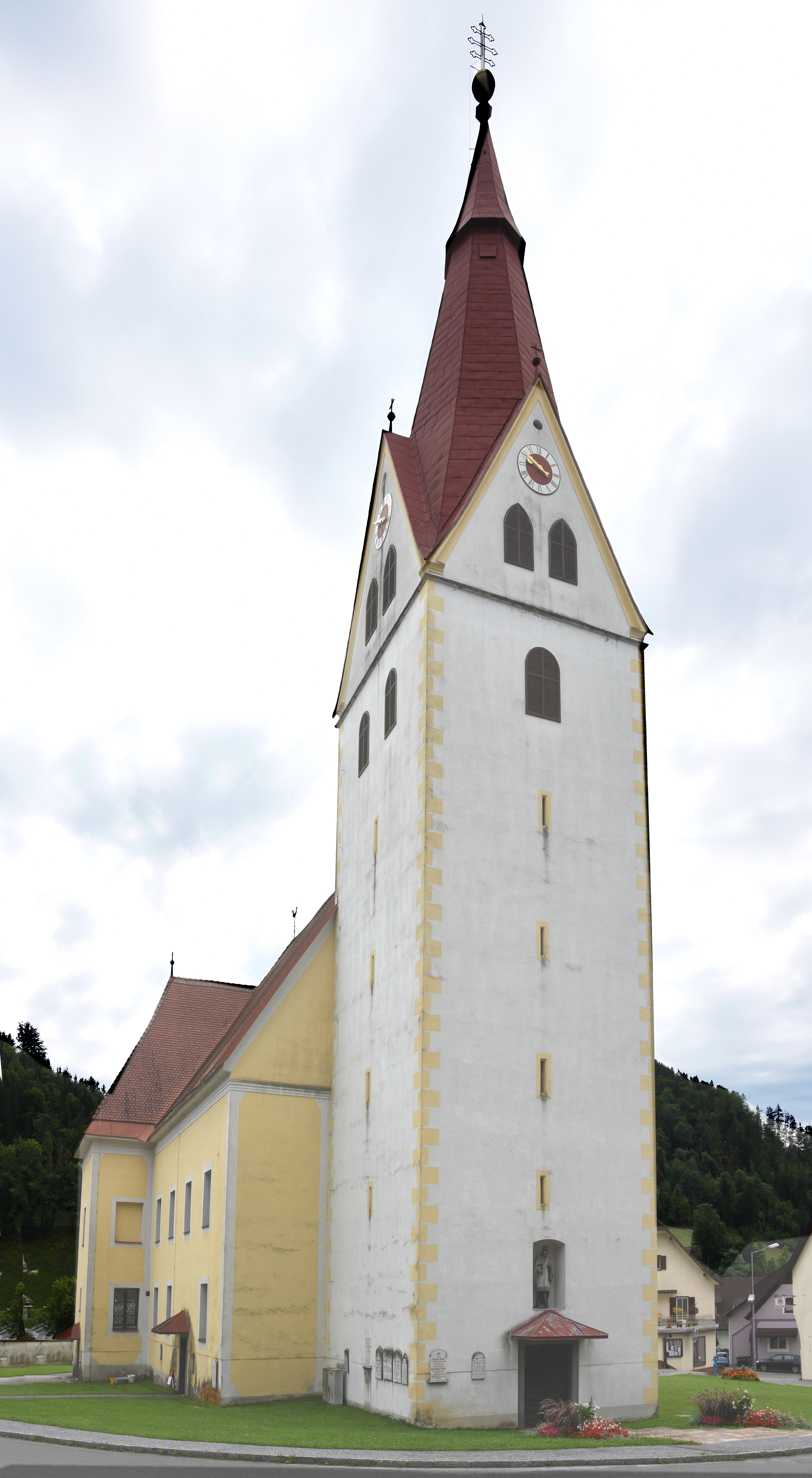
View from the northwest of the north and west sides of the church with the late Gothic steeple

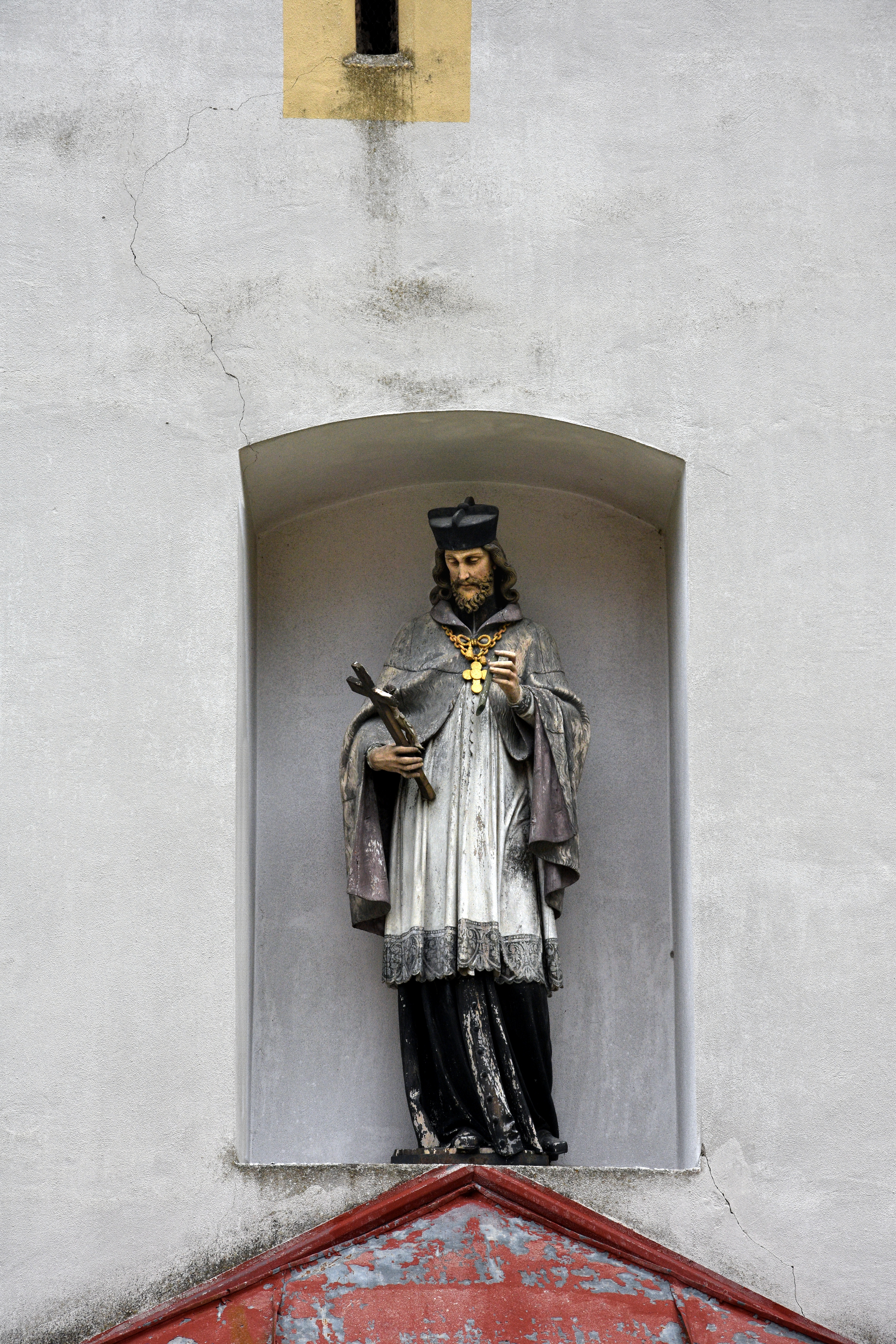
Nepomuk statue above the tower portal

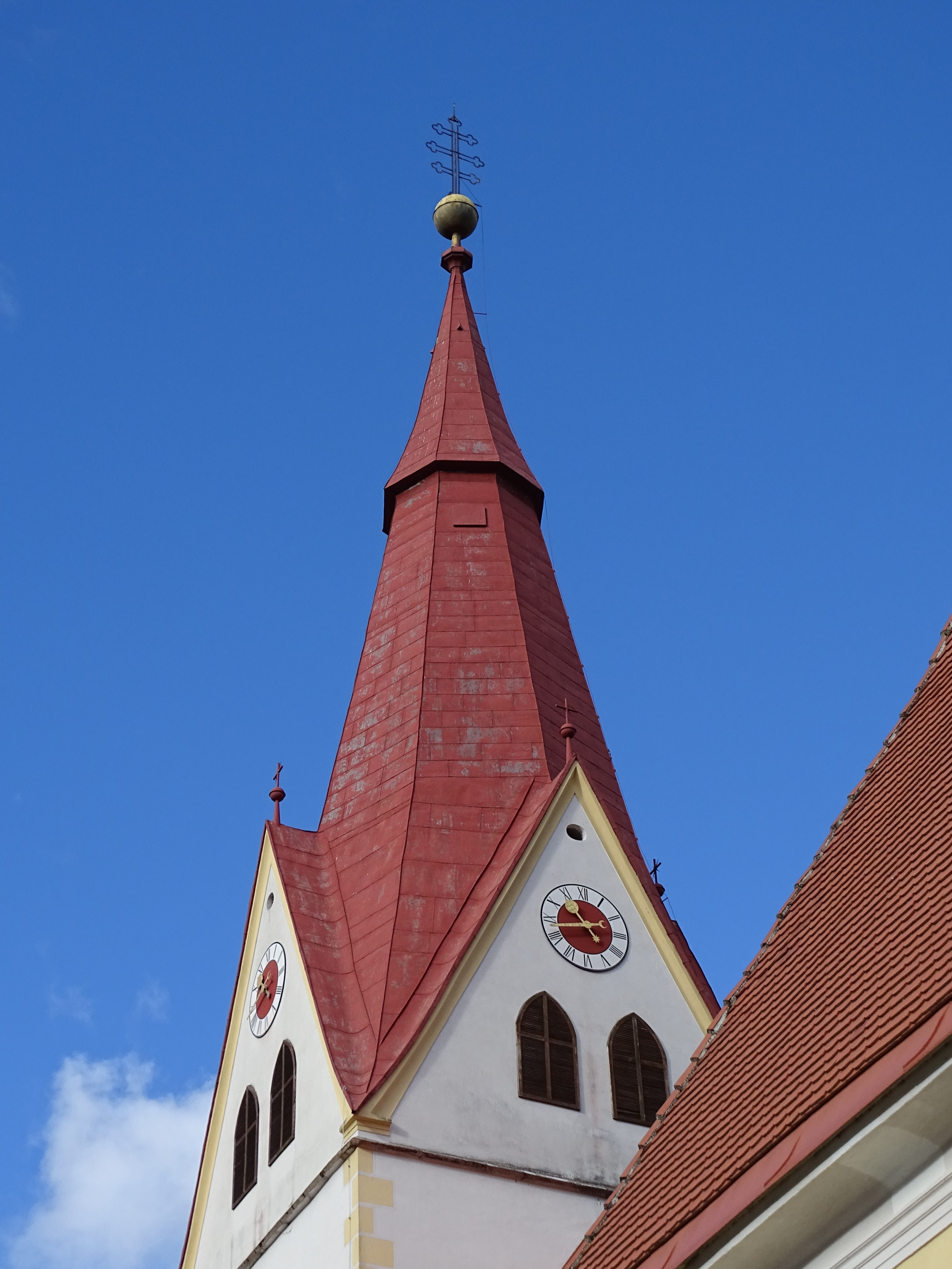
Spire of the church tower

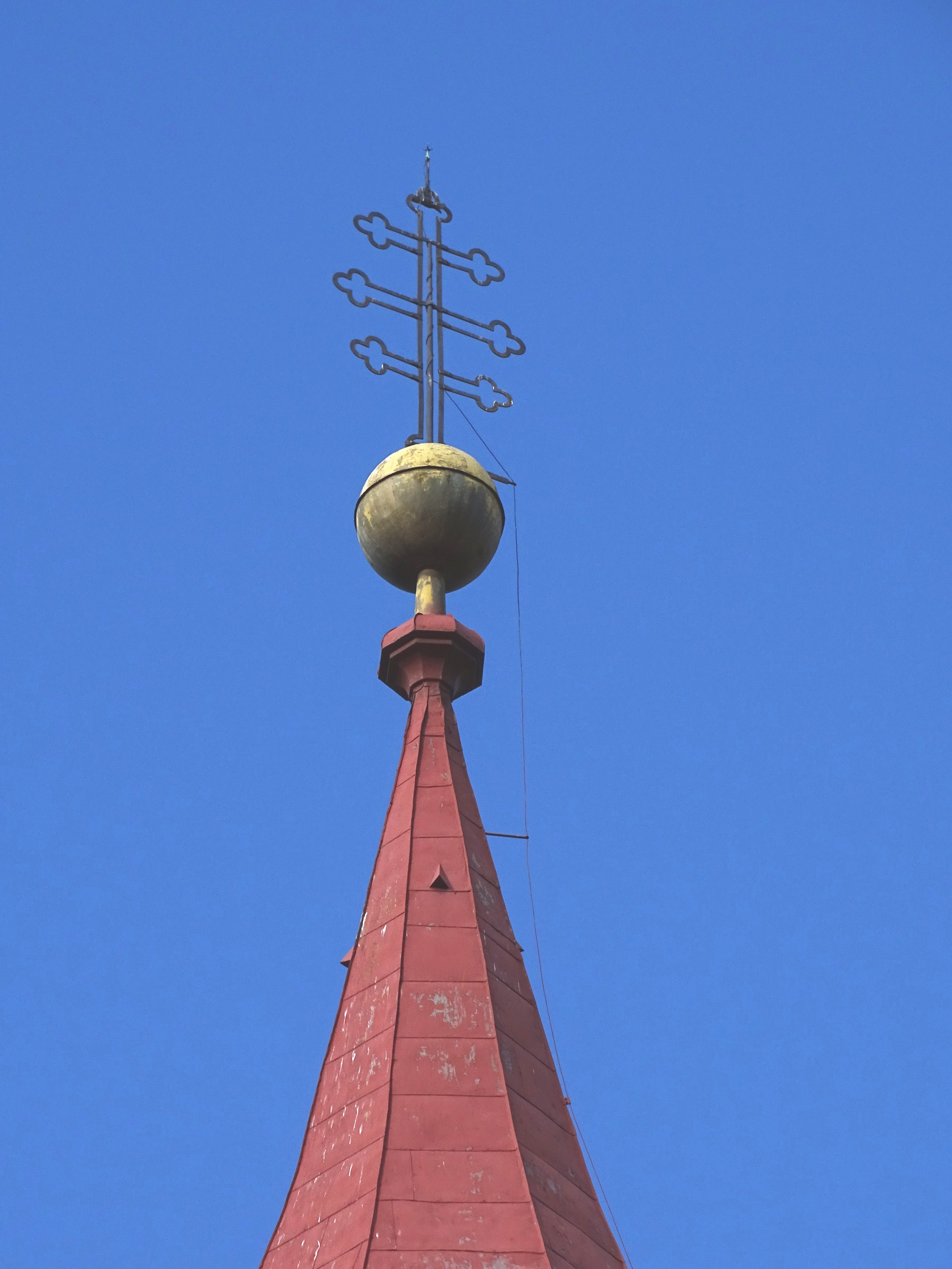
Steeple ball and three-bar cross on the spire of the church tower

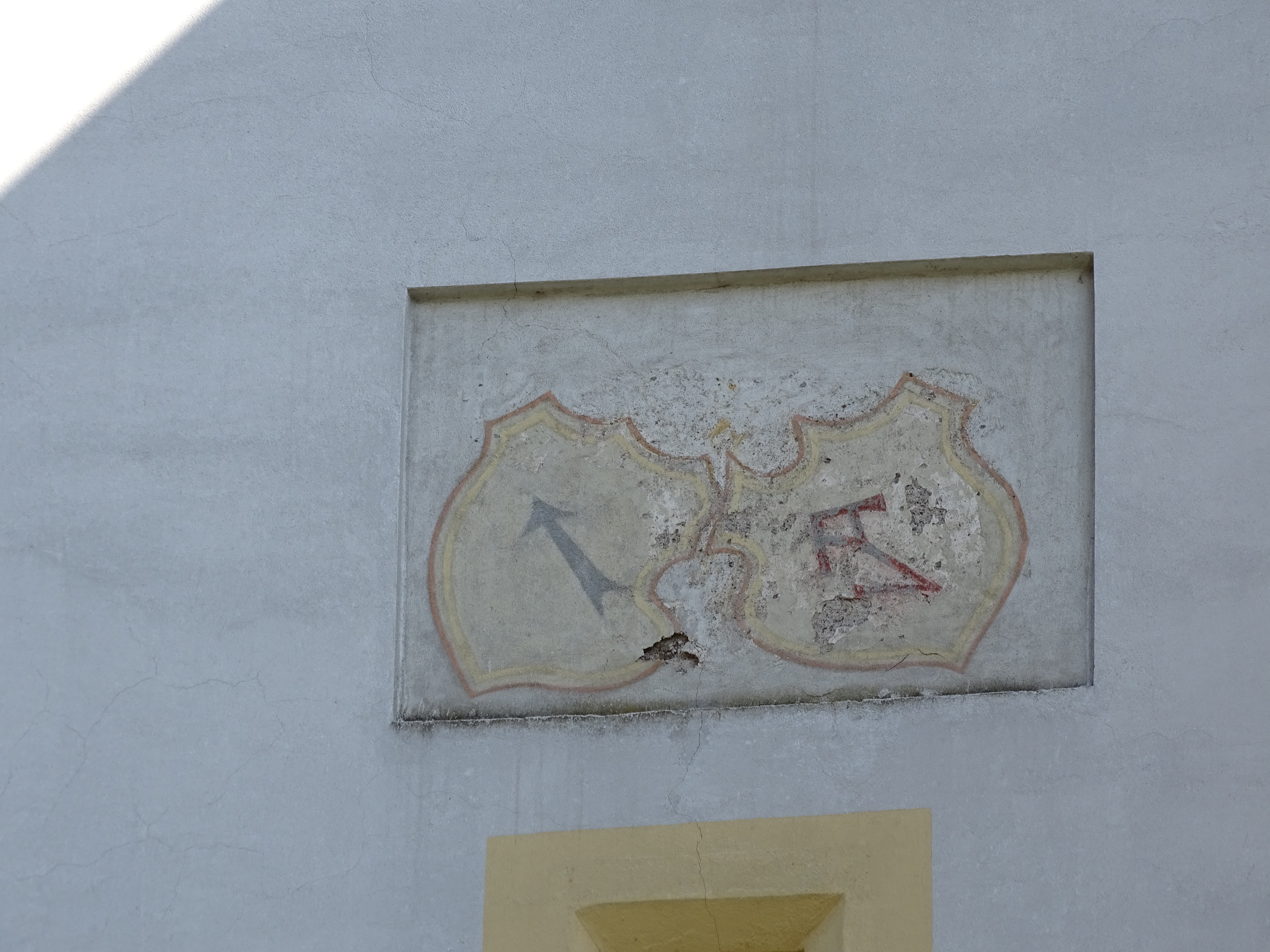
Painted blazon on the southern wall of the church tower

nave as well as the choir, the side chapel and the sacristy have a hipped roof covered with tiles. The roof of the nave overhangs that of the annexes and has a dormer on its southern side. There is a weathercock on the ridge above the transition from the nave to the choir. On the roof ridges of the annexes, i.e. the sacristy, the side chapel and the choir, there is a cross on a sphere in each case. The interior of the church is accessed through two portals, one on the north and one on the south side of the nave. These sides each have three simple latticed rectangular windows on the ground floor. At the level of the perimeter gallery, on each side of the nave, there are seven simple and latticed rectangular windows. Likewise, the chancel has one latticed rectangular window on each of its north and south sides. At the end of the choir there is a round window directly above the high altar. The side chapel has only one window on the east side, while the sacristy has one window each on the north, south, and west.

In the west, the mighty late Gothic church tower is attached to the Baroque nave. The church tower, completed in its present form in 1587, has an eight-sided pointed spire, the present design of which dates from 1846 and 1895. The spire covered with tin ends in a spire with a cross with three crossbeams placed on it. The tops of the four gable ends of the helmet have a sphere with crosses on it as decoration. On the southern tower wall there are two painted blazons, one of which probably shows the house mark of a Ruep Nusspaum. The same sign can be found on a memorial stone for Ruep Nusspaum at the Stallhofen parish church. In the niche above the portal on the west side of the tower is a statue of St. John of Nepomuk from the late 19th century, brought here in 1975 from the convent of the Graz Sisters of Charity of the Holy Cross. On the south side the tower has five light slits, on the east and north side four each. It is only below the attic that two round-arched windows on the north and south sides and one on the east side let light into the tower's interior. In the triangular gables, the tower has two round-arched windows on each of the four sides, and above them, also on each side, a clock face. Through the tower portal one enters the so-called tower house and further into the nave. The walls of the tower, like those of the nave, are articulated by painted window frames and by a quoin, also painted.

Around the church and the tower are preserved numerous tombstones set into the wall. They are the remains of the old churchyard, abandoned in 1900, which was located here. The oldest of the tombstones date back to the middle of the 18th century and are partly reminiscent of the former mills, blacksmiths, scythe and iron hammer trades in this area. Since most evidence of these trades has now disappeared, the gravestones are a regional historical testimony. A crucifix hangs on the south exterior wall of the side chapel. In the southeast corner of the churchyard is the war memorial of the Kainach municipality commemorating the fallen and missing of both world wars.

=== Interior description ===
The three- and five-bay nave is spanned by a cross vault resting on pier arches. The pier arches sit on pilasters. In the western part of the nave is a brick barrel vault music matroneum, into which a wooden gallery, the so-called Schmiedenchor or Schmiedenkotter, was inserted at the base of the barrel vault, probably in 1751 or in the third quarter of the 18th century at the instigation of the local scythe smiths under Wolfgang Riedl. The nave is a barrel-vaulted music gallery.

The one-bay chancel with a three-aisle closure connects seamlessly to the nave and is also cross-vaulted. The side aisles are located on both sides of the nave under circumferential galleries. In the west of the nave, a staircase on each side leads to the music gallery and to the side galleries. A spiral staircase also leads up to the north gallery from the sacristy. Behind the music gallery and the organ, a door leads to the interior of the church tower. A side chapel with the altar of the cross is attached to the south aisle on the east yoke, while the sacristy is attached to the east yoke of the north aisle, which was originally planned as another side chapel.

== Equipment ==
=== Choir section ===
The altars as well as the baroque interior decoration were made between 1720 and 1760 by the Judenburg workshop of Balthasar Prandtstätter.

The high altar was built at the beginning of the 18th century, with the mensa dating from 1677 and the altarpiece from 1725. The statues were originally in the parish church of Köflach and were later moved here. The Köflach master carpenter Zacharias Stainacher provided the altar with two new columns and lesenes in 1741 and probably also redesigned the altarpiece and the tabernacle. The retablo shows St. George on horseback stabbing the dragon with a spear. In the background of the scene is the king's daughter from the legend of George praying. To the left of the altarpiece are two figures, the outer one depicting St. Sebastian pierced by arrows, the other St. Martin in the garb of a bishop. At the feet of the figure of St. Martin, following the legend of the saint, a goose is depicted. To the right of the altarpiece are also two figures. The outer one shows St. Florian in the garb of a duke, the other St. Nicholas as a bishop. In the center of the altarpiece is depicted Mary, crowned by the Holy Trinity after the assumption of Mary. To the left of this scene are two figures of St. Lambert and Donatus, and to the right two figures of St. Leonard and St. Benedict. With the figure of St. Lambert, a reference is made to the St. Lambert's abbey, to which the parish church belonged until the 18th century. The baroque tabernacle of the high altar, framed by two angel figures, probably dates from the 19th century. On the top of the tabernacle is a representation of the Seven seals of God and the Lamb of God lying on it.

On October 17, 2004, a new popular altar and an ambo were consecrated. The people's altar was made according to plans by Gustav Troger from 14 blocks of Kainach marble, which comes from the Lehnhart quarry near Kainach. For the ambo, also designed according to Troger's plans, sandstone from the Sunfixl cave, an old mine for grinding stones on the Hemmerberg, was used. Two glass hanging chandeliers hang in the church, one of them from 1853. On each of the two long sides of the choir is a single-row choir stall.

The glass in the round window above the high altar is colored. The two leadlight windows on the sides of the chancel are decorated with colored ornaments and a depiction of the Sacred Heart. Hanging in the chancel are four of a total of twelve oval paintings of the twelve apostles, painted in the first half of the 18th century, in the late baroque style. These paintings came to Kainach from the St. Lambert's abbey, which was affected by the monastery closures, as part of Josephinism.

=== Nave ===
In the nave, next to the main altar, there are two side altars from the period after 1750. On the Mary altar, the left of the two side altars, there is a copy of the Mariazell treasury picture in the center, which has been touched to the original. To the left of the picture are two figures, St. Barbara with a chalice and the host in her hand and St. Catherine with a wheel at her feet. To the right of the altarpiece are figures of St. Agatha with two breasts in her hands and St. Notburga holding a sickle. In the extension of the altar, in the center, there is a figure of St. Ursula holding three arrows. On the right side altar, which in literature is also called the altar of St. Catherine, there is a statue of the Sacred Heart in the center. Grouped around this statue on the left are the figures of St. Oswald, wearing a crown on his head, and St. Dominic, depicted in a monk's habit. On the right are the figures of St. Pancras and St. Teresa of Ávila with the crown of thorns on her head. The Holy Spirit in the form of a dove and God the Father in the altarpiece, together with the statue of Jesus, form the Holy Trinity.

The pulpit dates from around 1725 to 1750, i.e. from the first half of the 18th century, and was probably made by Johann Grabmayr, son of the sculptor Andreas Grabmayr, who worked in Mariazell. The basket as well as the sound lid are partially decorated with acanthus ornaments. On the sound lid is a statue of the Archangel Michael with sword and trombone. On the northern wall of the nave is a wooden confessional.

The parapet of the forged choir inserted under the music gallery is decorated with five reliefs. In the center of the parapet is a double-headed eagle based on the imperial coat of arms with the Madonna and the Mariazell treasury image. The eagle with a crown above its heads holds a sword as well as a scepter in its talons. To the left of the eagle, reliefs depict the Archangel Michael holding a shield with the inscription "QVIS UT DEVS", the Latin translation of his name (Engl. "Who is like God"), and St. John of Nepomuk, who, according to one legend, is hearing the confession of the wife of the Bohemian King Wenceslaus IV. The wife depicted is probably Sophia of Bavaria, but according to another legend it may also be Joanna of Bavaria. On the other side of the eagle relief are depicted St. Florian extinguishing a burning house and a guardian angel watching over a child.

The leadlight windows on both long sides on the ground floor of the nave are decorated with color ornaments, at least some of which were created by Ed. Stuhl in Graz in 1894. The simple windows on the stairways to the gallery and in the gallery area are unadorned. The baroque Stations of the Cross on the gallery pillars are partially painted over. Furthermore, eight of the twelve oval apostle paintings from the first half of the 18th century hang in the nave. Opposite the Mary altar hangs an oil painting of St. Anne together with her daughter Mary, painted in the 19th century. Opposite the altar of St. Catherine hangs an oil painting, also painted in the 19th century, of St. Joseph of Nazareth with the Child Jesus. On the left stairway to the organ hangs a picture of the Madonna with the Child Jesus and on the right stairway that of a guardian angel. On the back of the nave there is an inscription:

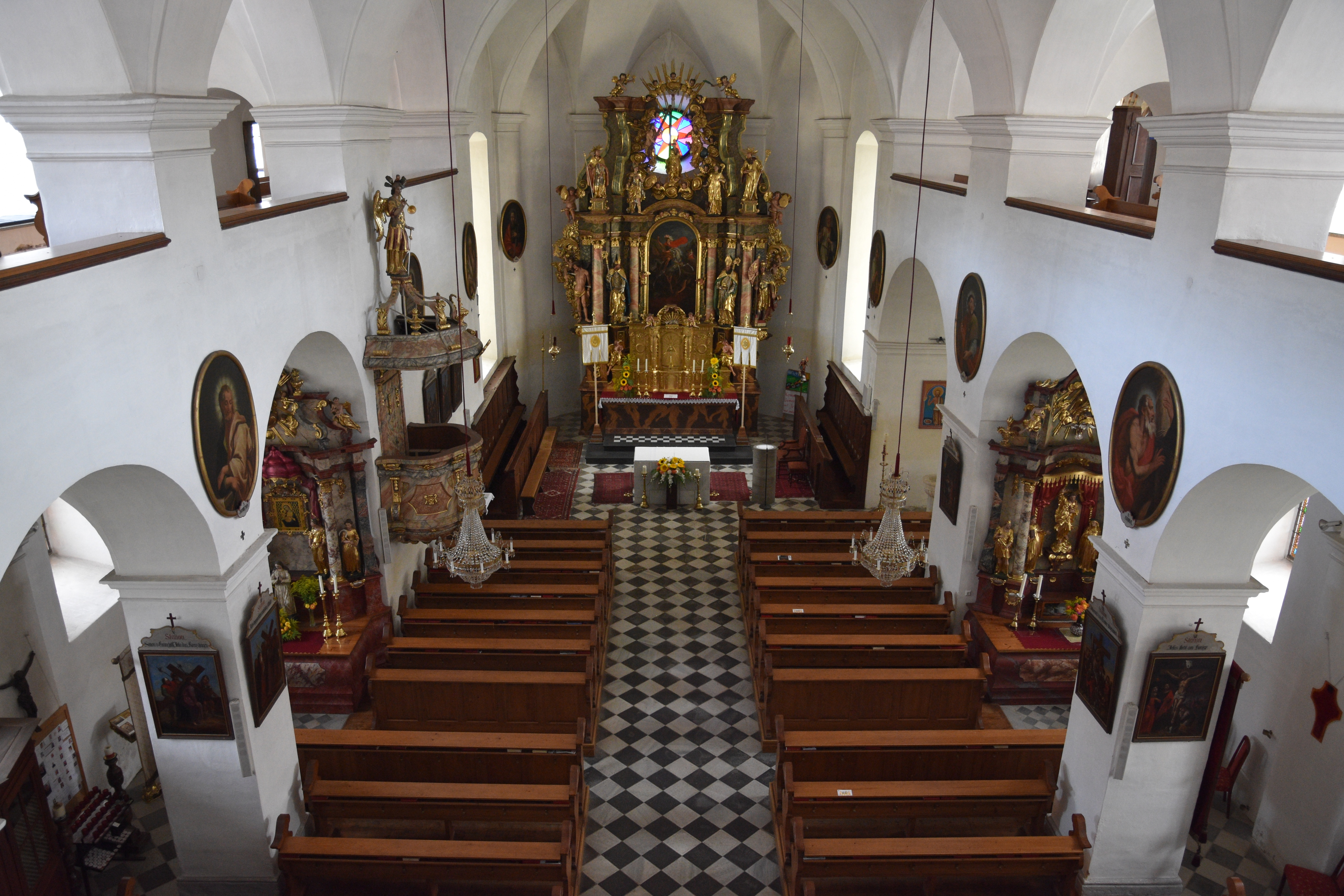
View from the music gallery of the high altar, the two side altars, the pulpit and part of the nave.

Funditus erectum 1422: Von Grund auf neu errichtet

Rece(n)us aedificatum 1725: Wieder neu aufgebaut

Coloribus pictum 1890: Mit Farben bemalt

Renovatum 1967: Erneuert

==== Side chapel ====
In the side chapel stands the baroque cruciform altar dedicated to St. Joseph of Nazareth. This altar was also made after 1750 in Prandtstätter's workshop. It bears a crucifix with a larger-than-life corpus and is decorated with sculptural work. The crucifix is framed by four angel figures. The two larger figures are attached directly to the altar, while the two smaller ones are

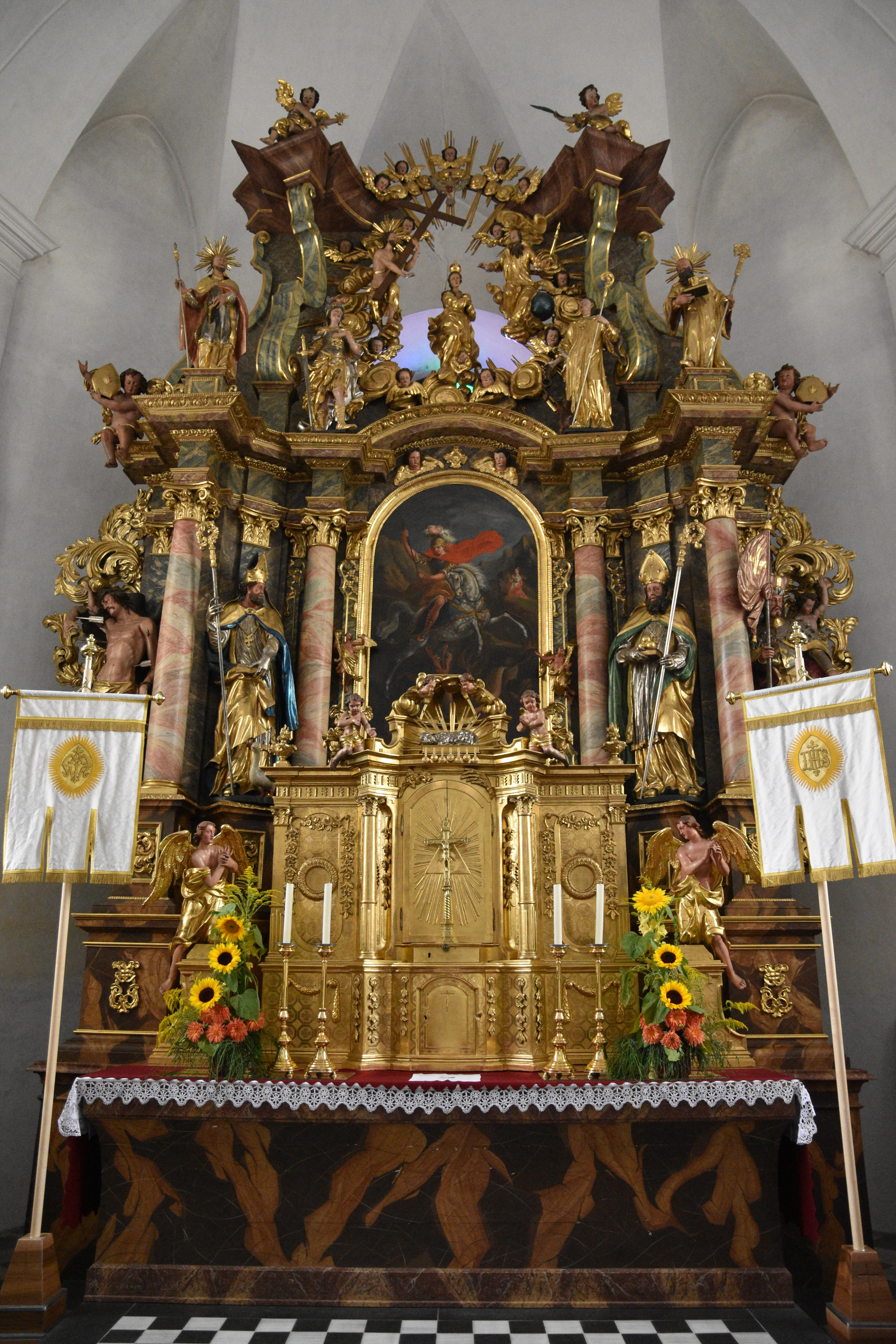
The high altar with the altarpiece of St. George.

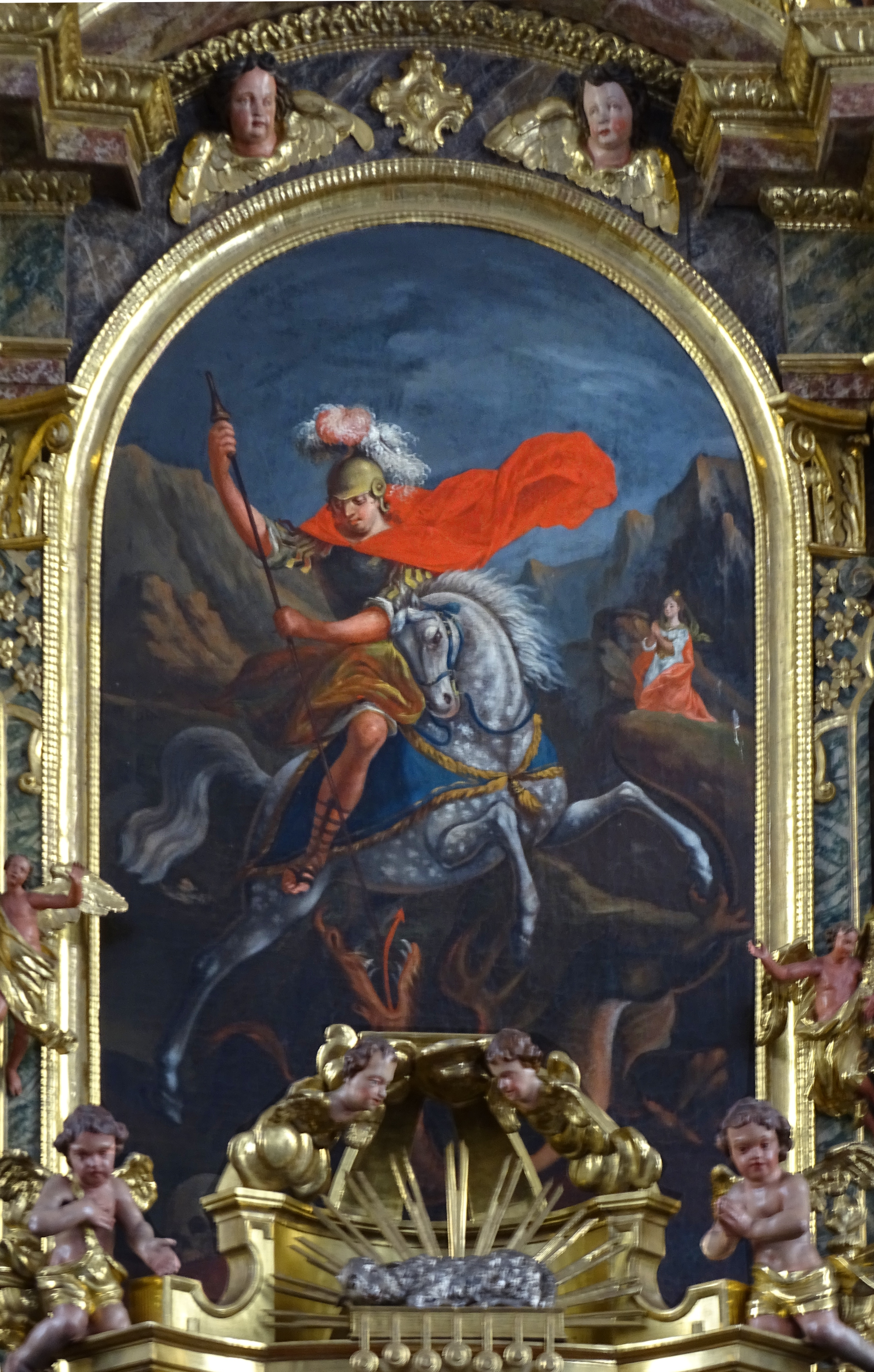
The altarpiece shows St. George on horseback killing a dragon.

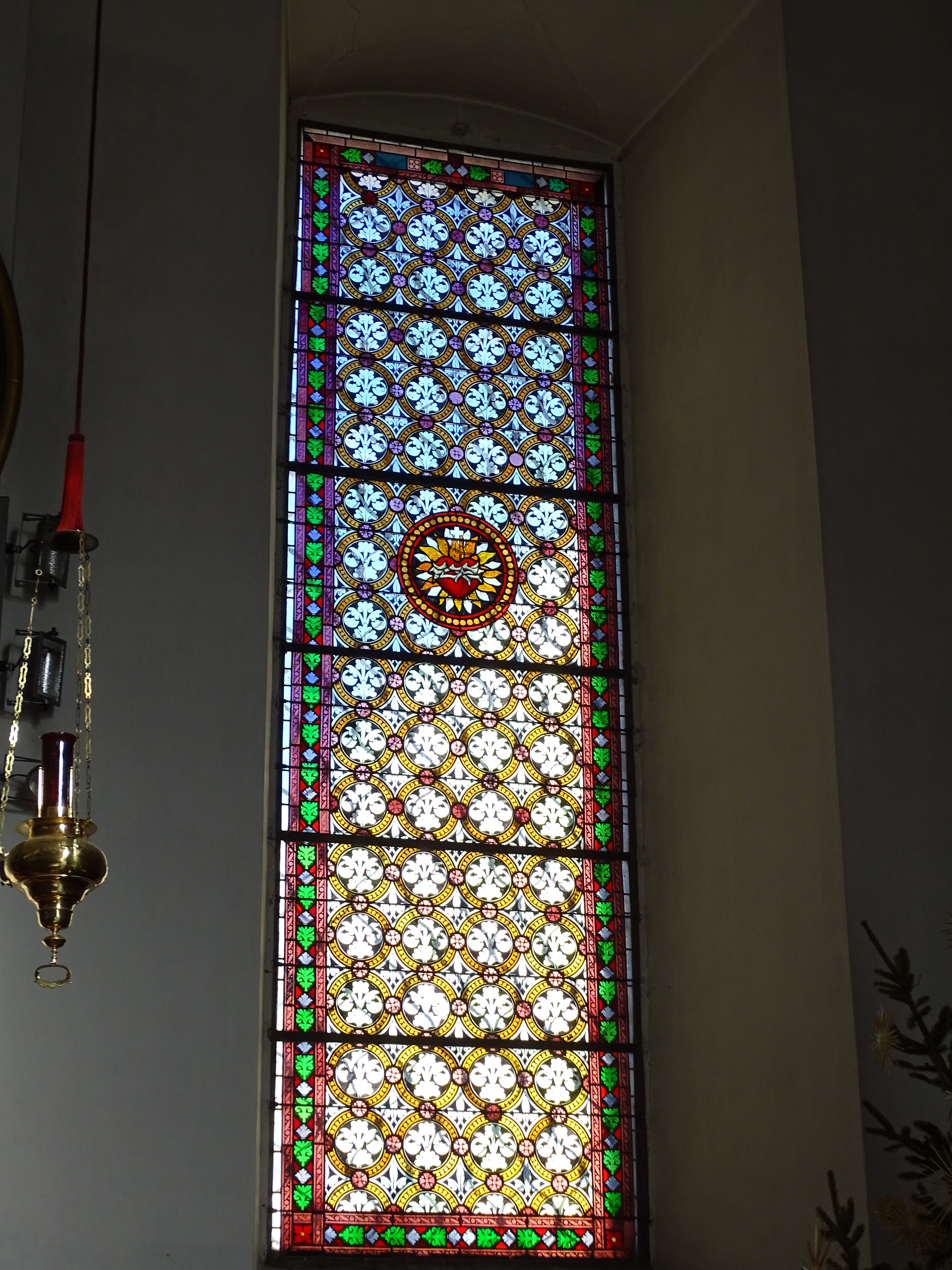
One of the two rectangular windows in the chancel with color ornaments and a representation of the Sacred Heart.

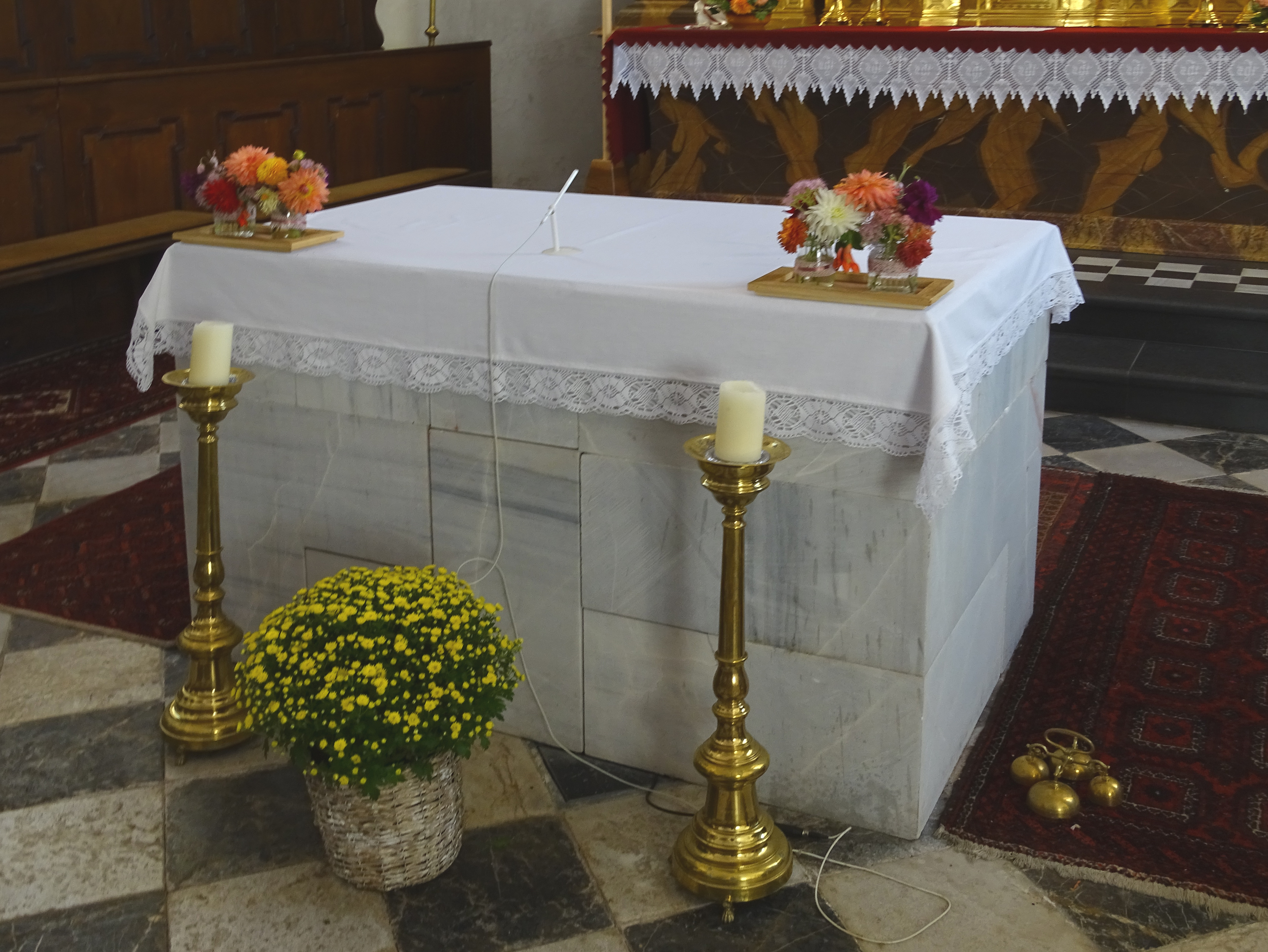
The popular altar made of Kainach marble designed by Gustav Troger.

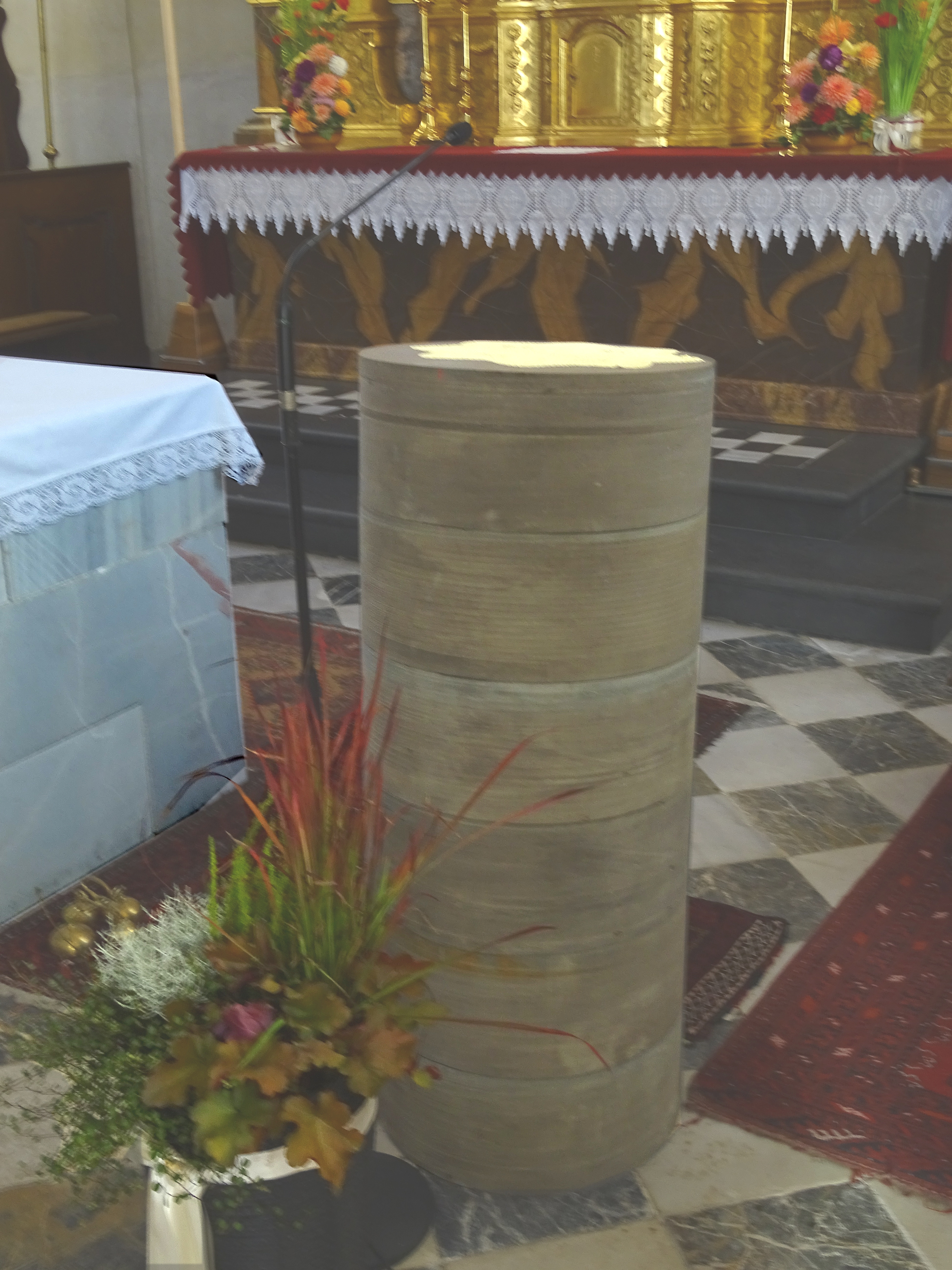
The sandstone ambo designed by Gustav Troger.

placed on the wall behind the altar. On the altar of the cross there is a tabernacle with a representation of St. Rosalia dating from the first half of the 18th century. On the left side of the chapel room there is a baroque baptismal font, which can be dated by an inscription to the year 1623. On the eastern wall near the baptismal font hangs a picture of St. John the Baptist painted by Franz Weiss in 2006. The window in the side chapel is decorated with simple color ornaments.

=== Tower house ===
The tower house west of the nave is the first floor of the church tower. The portal on the west side of the tower

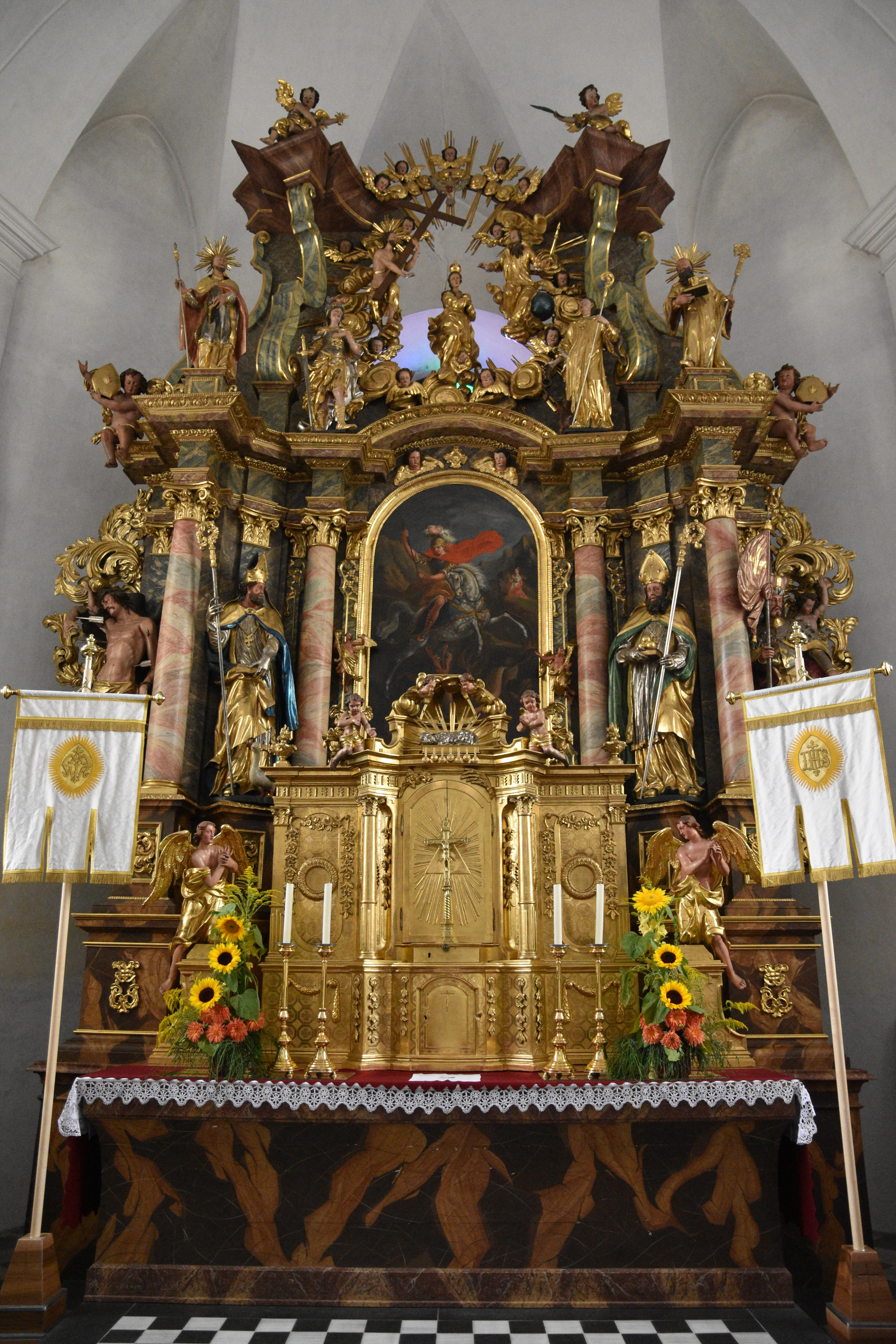
The high altar with the altarpiece of St. George.

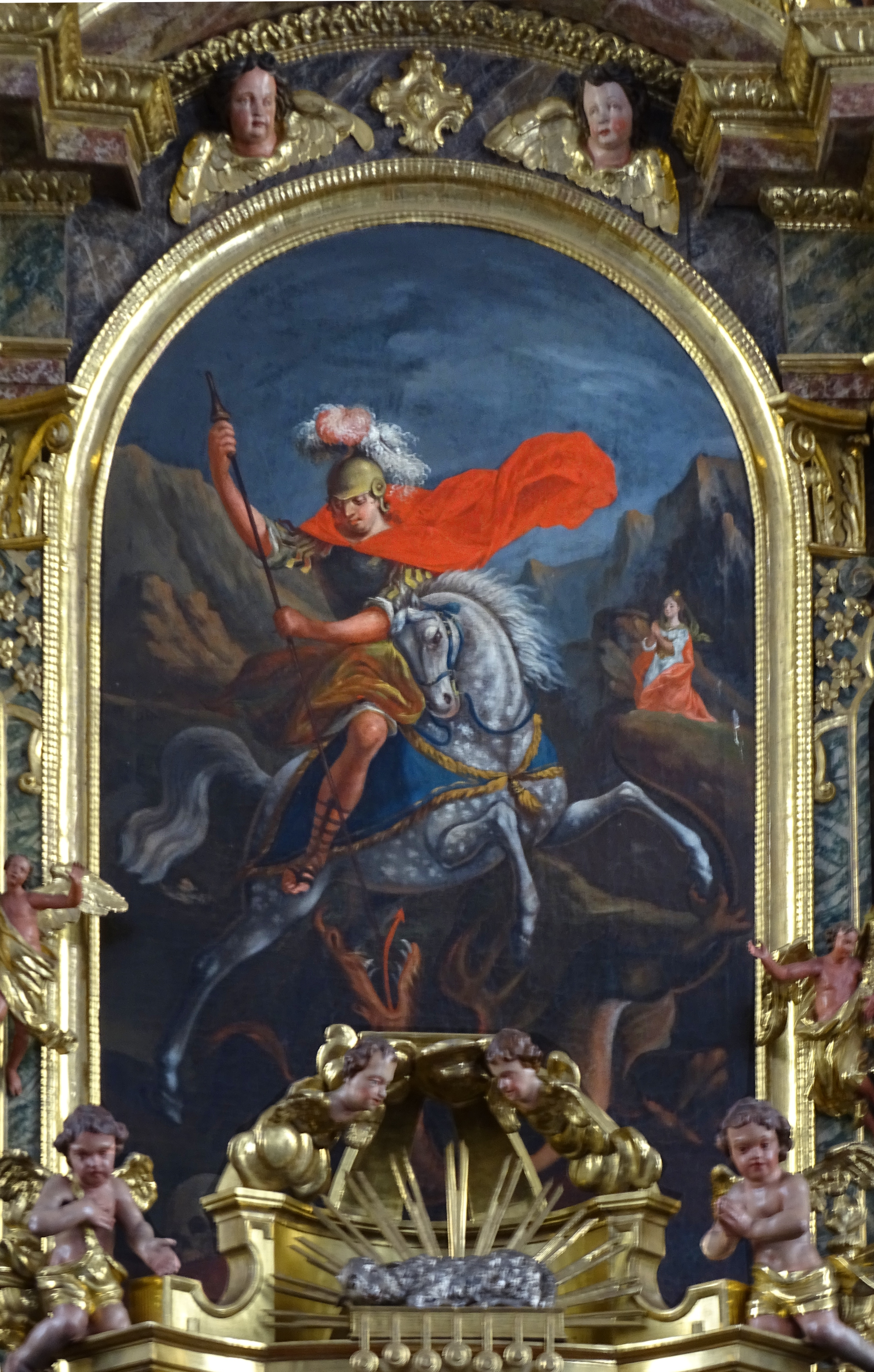
The altarpiece shows St. George on horseback killing a dragon.

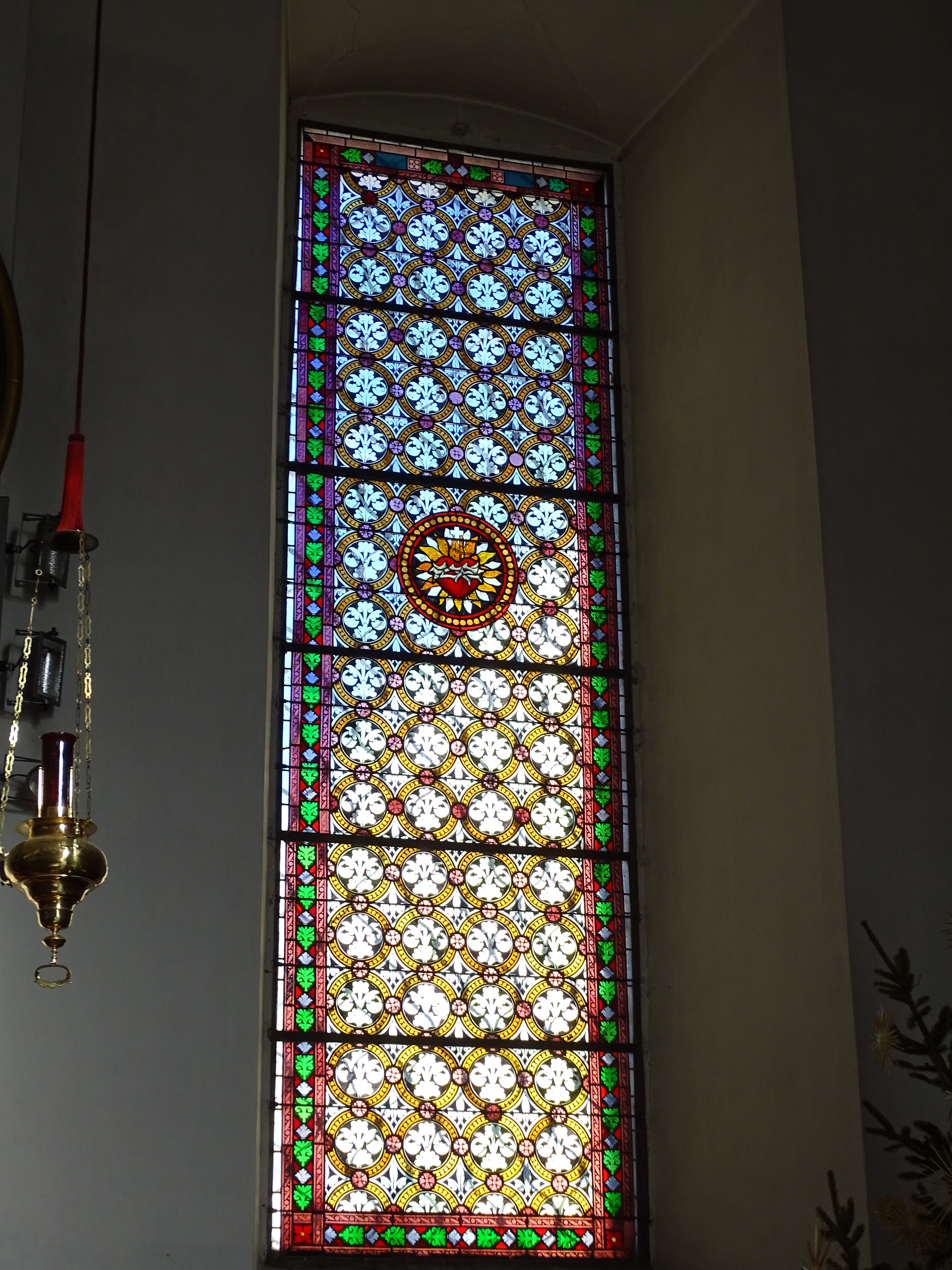
One of the two rectangular windows in the chancel with color ornaments and a representation of the Sacred Heart.

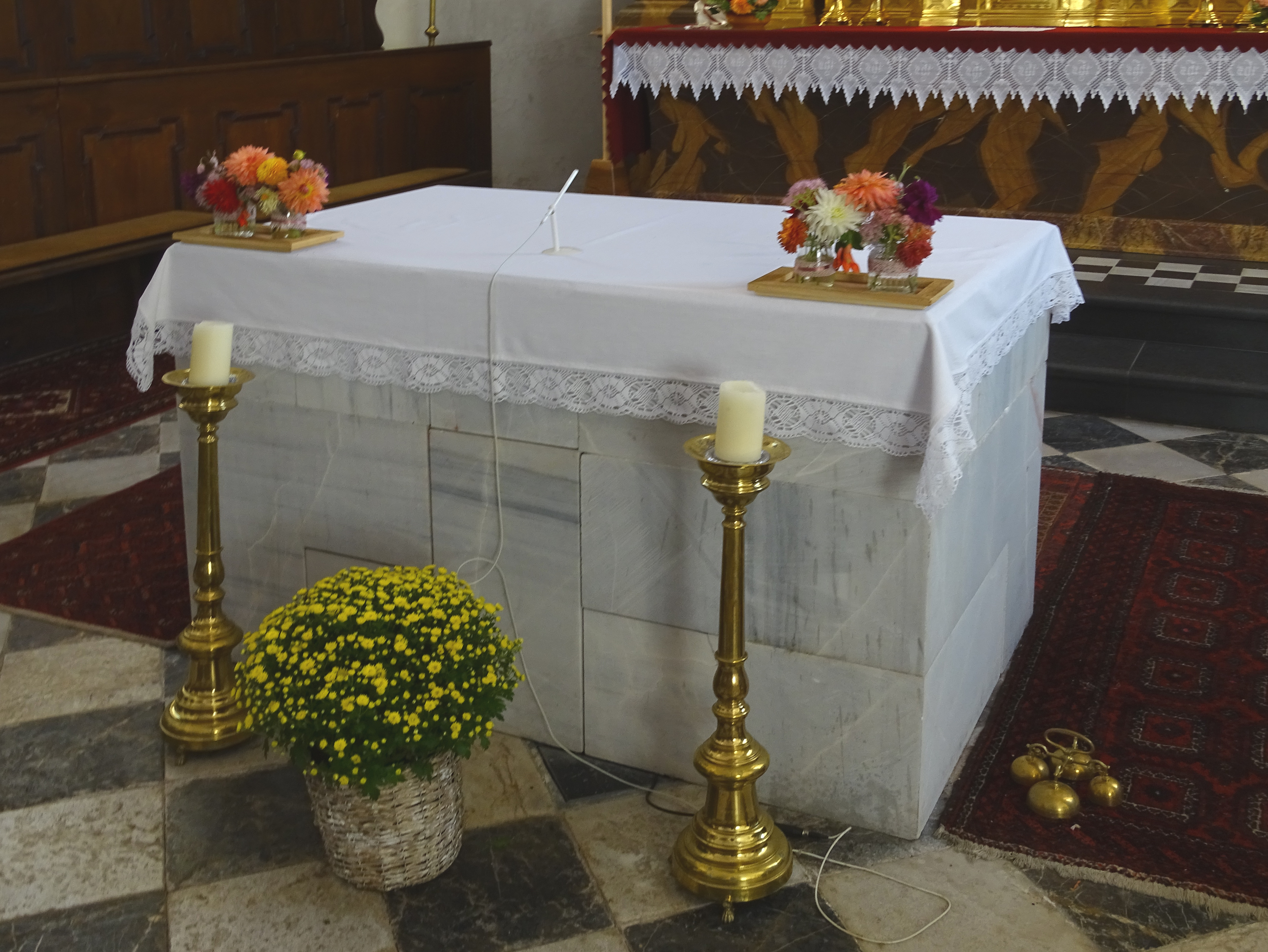
The popular altar made of Kainach marble designed by Gustav Troger.

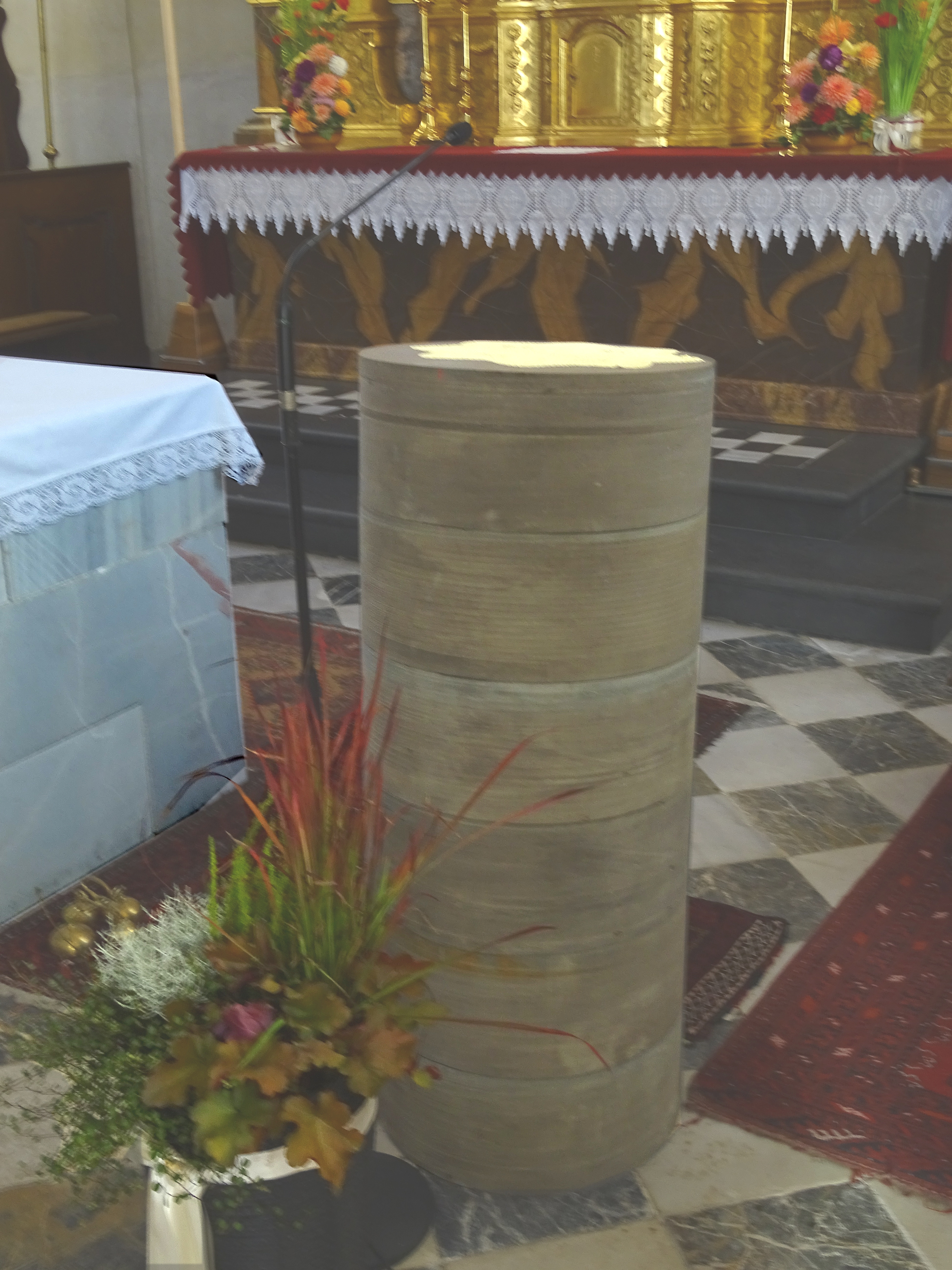
The sandstone ambo designed by Gustav Troger.

leads into the tower house. In this room hang wooden reliefs made by Fred Höfler in 1978. The reliefs on the southern wall show scenes from Creation, while the reliefs on the northern wall show scenes from the life of Jesus Christ, such as his baptism, the Sermon on the Mount, the foot washing, the Passion as well as the Resurrection. Furthermore, a figure of the Holy Family carved by the Kainach artist Hubert Murgg stands in this room. This figure stands at Christmas time in the Nativity scene of Kainach.

== Organ ==
A first organ with one manual and eight organ stops was installed in 1703 and transferred to the Salla parish church in 1883. As a replacement for the old organ, the old organ of the Köflach parish church was brought to Kainach in the same year. It was built by Andreas Schwarz in 1721 and has a marble-painted, five-axis facade. Two high rectangular bays, crowned by a blasted gable, flank a low, three-part bay, which also has a sprung pediment. The pipe fields terminate at the top with gilded, openwork tendril.

The construction work in Kainach was carried out in 1883 by the organ builder Jakob Konrad, who slightly rebuilt and adapted the organ. In 1949 and 1950, a technical rebuilding was carried out by the Hopferwieser brothers. Since then, the organ has ten stops on a manual and pedal. During the rebuilding, the previously used mechanical slider chests were replaced by pneumatic cone chests, and the organ's ambitus was expanded. About 20 percent of the 1721 pipe inventory has been preserved. A restoration and cleaning of the organ was carried out by Christian Hartinger in 2005.

Manual C-f^{3}
1	Principal	8′
2	Salicional	8′
3	Bourdon	8′
4	Copl	8′
5	Octav	4′
6	Pipe	4′
7	Superoctav	2′
8	Mixture III–IV

Pedal C-f^{1}
9.	Subbass	16′
10.	Gedecktbass	8′

- Coupler: M/P
- Spielhilfen: Forte, Tutti

== Bells ==
Three bells hang in the church tower. Two of these bells were raised on October 4, 1952, and consecrated by the Ordinary Chancellor Rosenberger. The consecration of the third bell, the St. Joseph's bell, took place on September 17, 1978. Older bells have not survived. A new peal with at least three bells of different sizes had been raised in 1575. The large bell of this peal jumped in 1790 and was recast by Johann Rauch in Graz in 1832. The 11 o'clock bell, the middle of the three bells, was also recast by Rauch in 1834. The three bells of this ringing were dedicated to St. George and Donatus and Mary. The large church bell had to be delivered in the course of the First World War together with the bell of the Neuhäusl chapel in the Oswaldgraben on October 6, 1916. As a replacement, two new bells cast by Krupp were raised on December 17, 1922. During World War II, the two larger bells also had to be surrendered on January 28, 1942.

== Parish ==
The parish of Kainach was a branch of the mother church of Piber from the 11th century. In the course of the

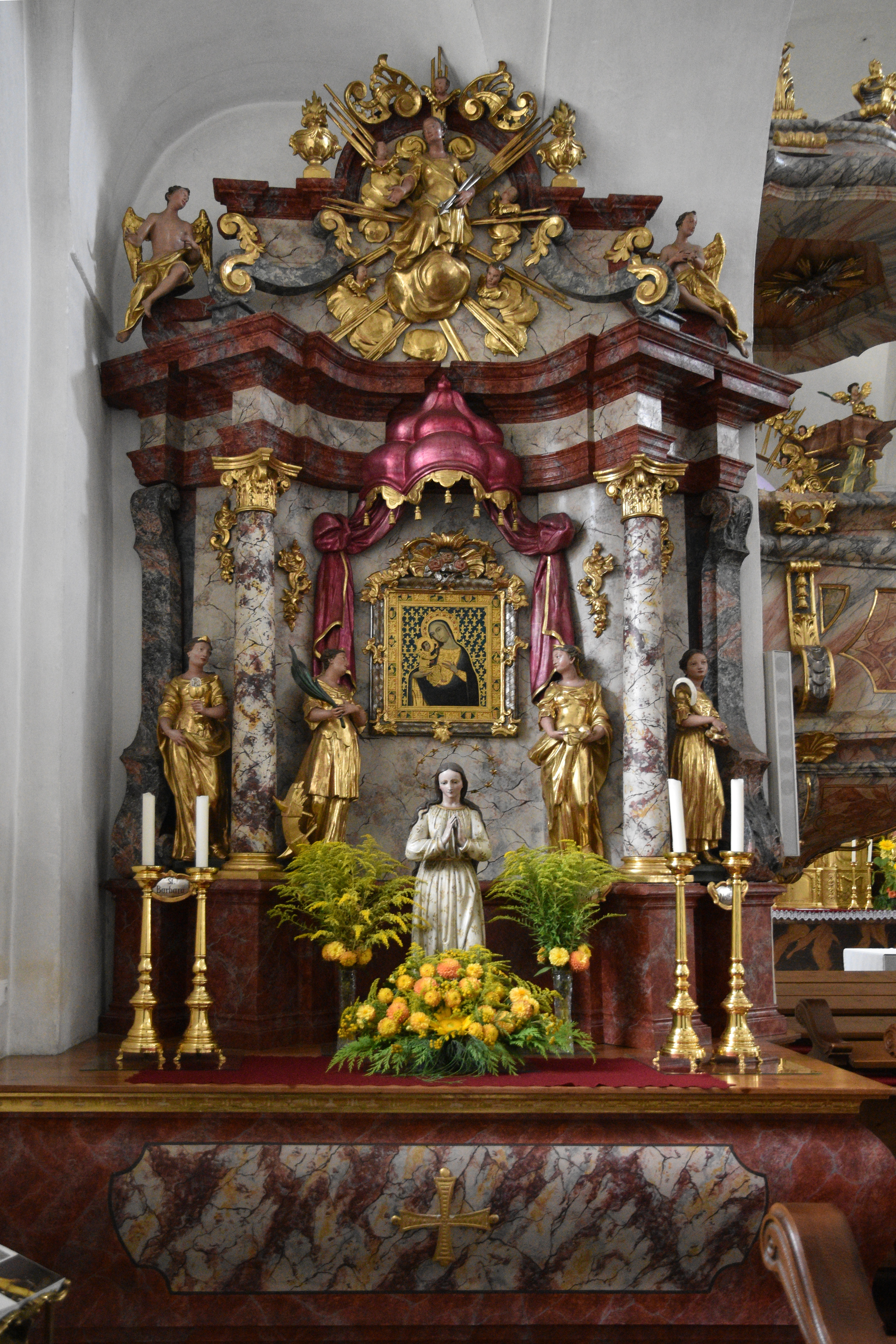
The altar of Mary, the left of the two side altars.

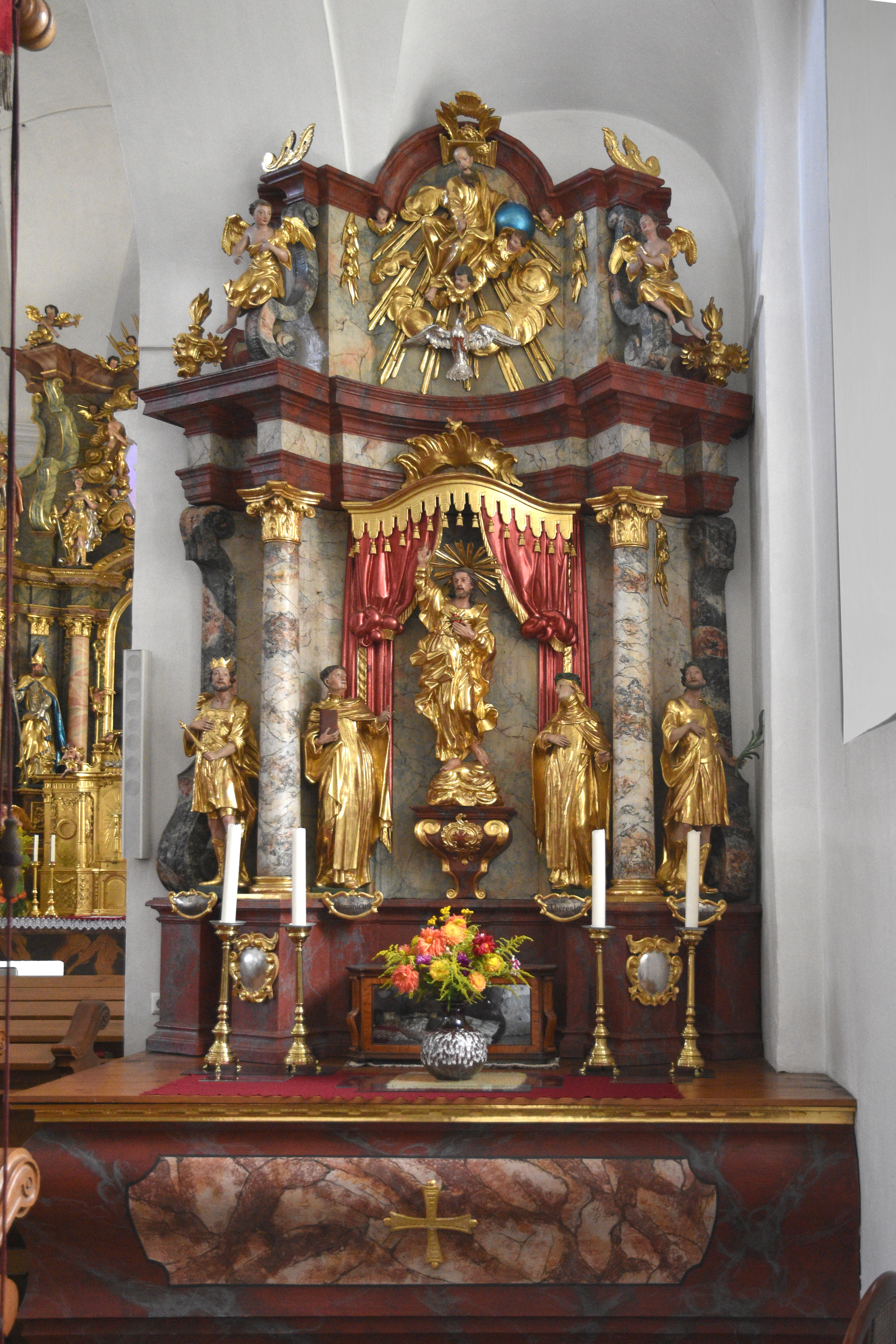
The altar of St. Catherine, the right of the two side altars.

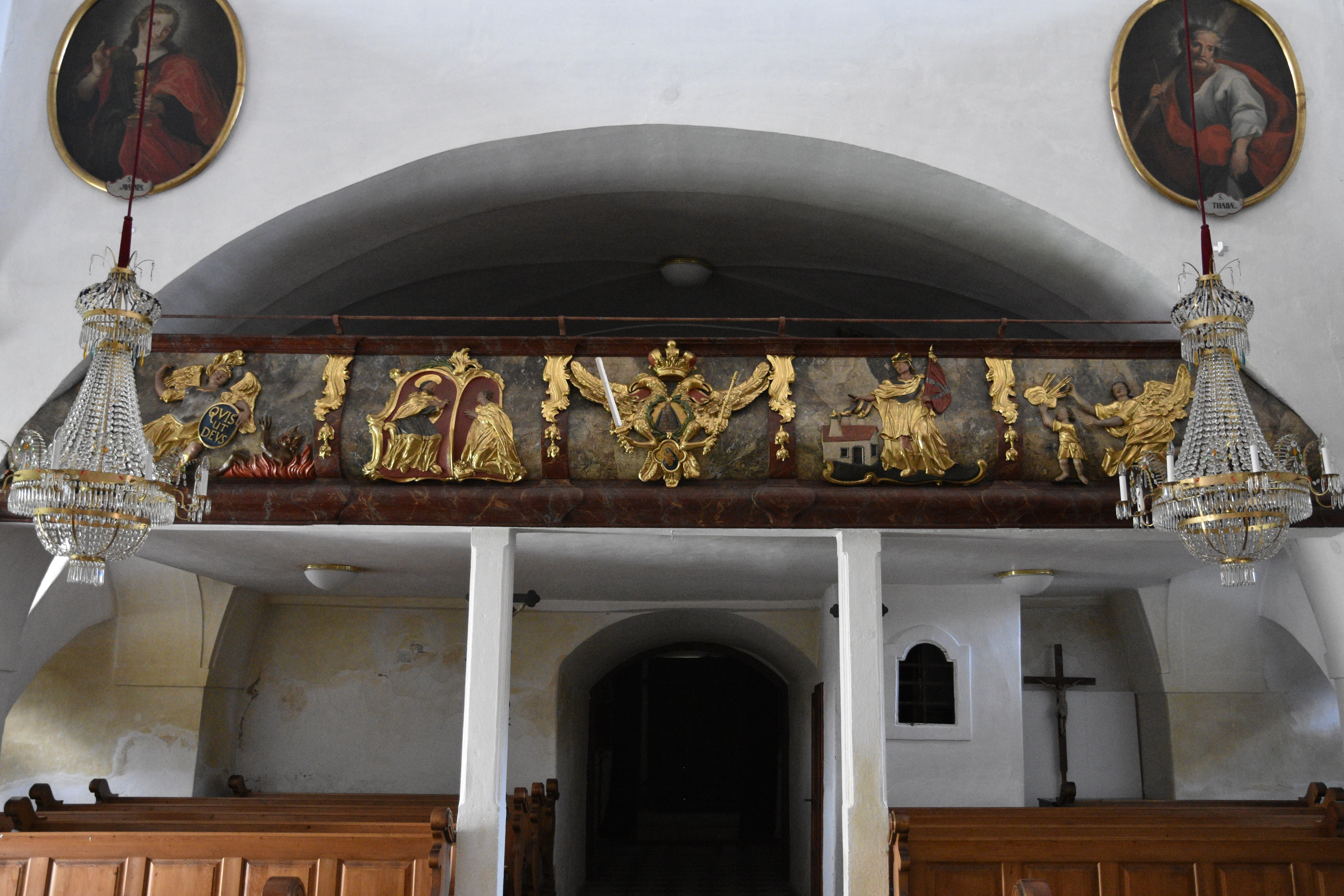
The forged choir inserted under the organ loft.

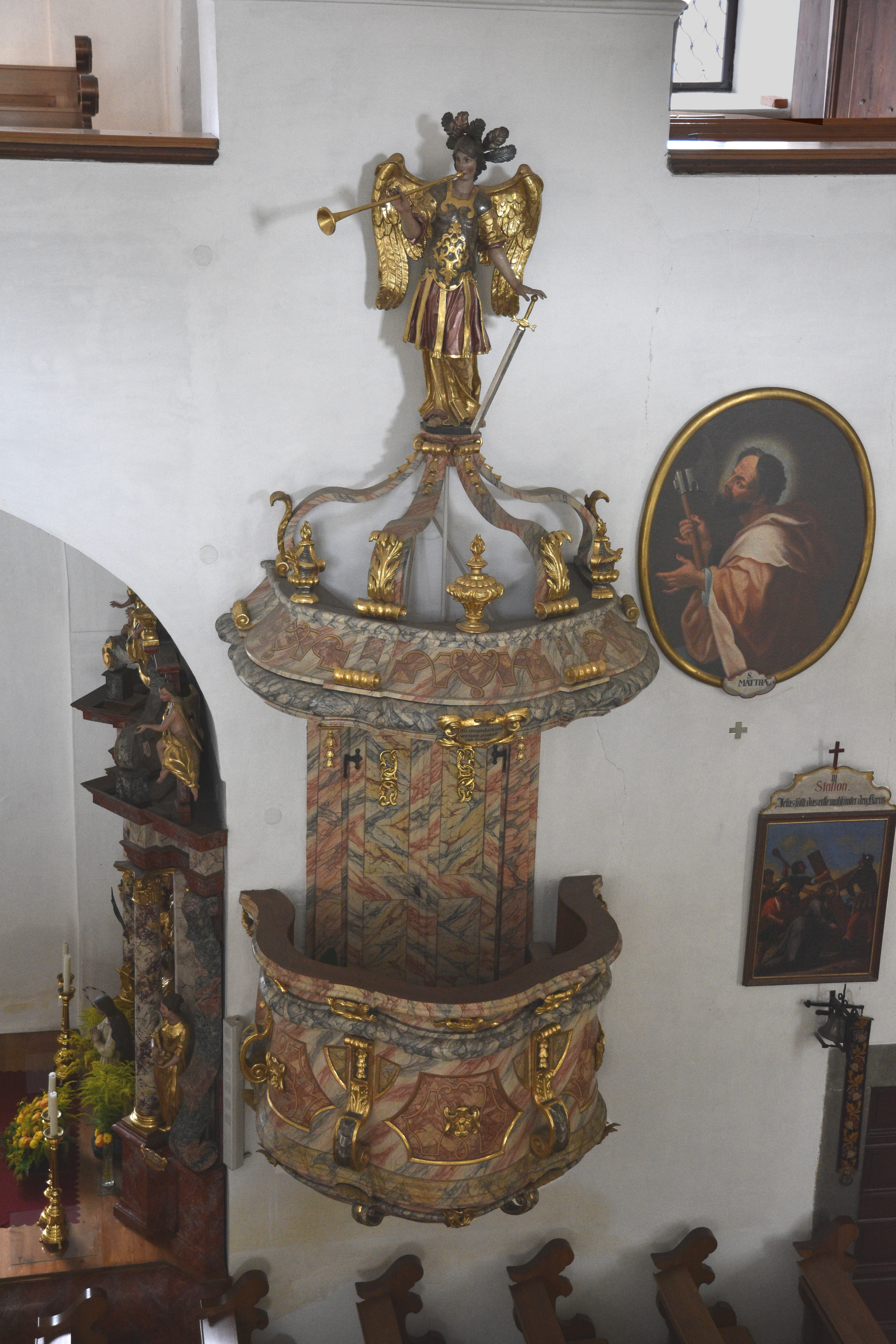
The pulpit with the figure of Archangel Michael on the sound cover.

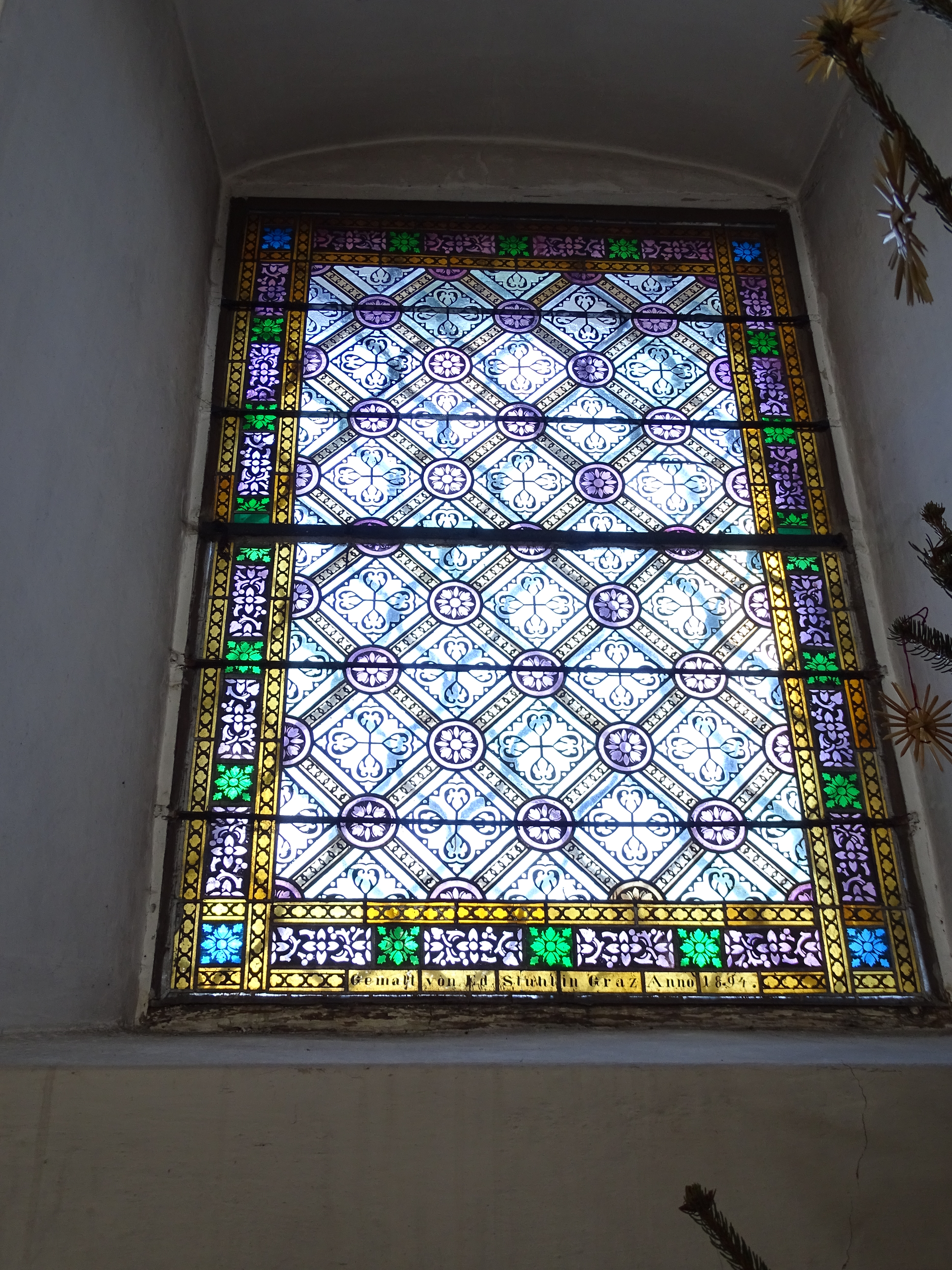
One of the leadlight windows in the nave decorated with color ornaments.

14th century, however, Kainach became independent as a parish and had a delimited territory. The oldest parish registers, the baptism and marriage registers, date back to 1631,

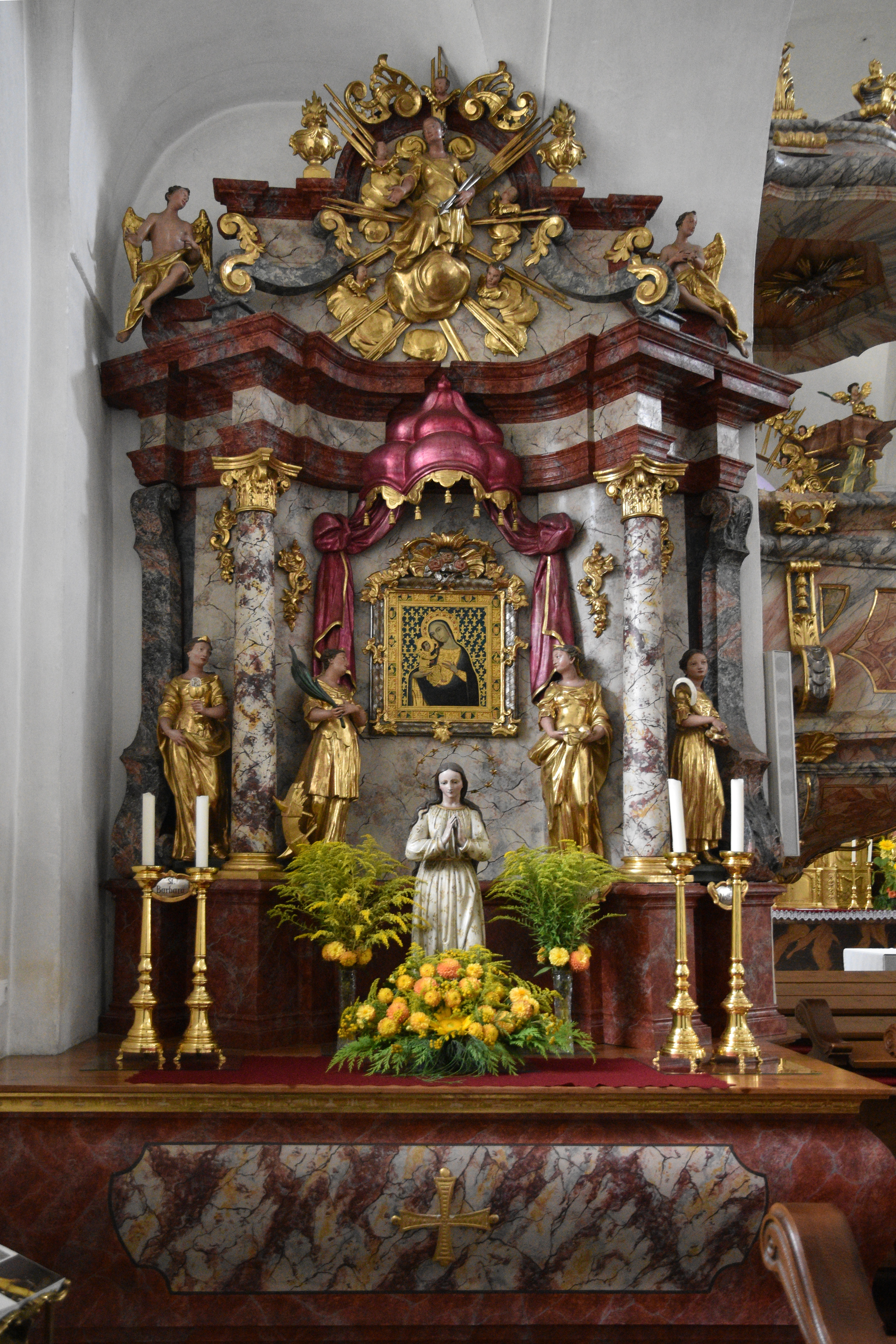
The altar of Mary, the left of the two side altars.

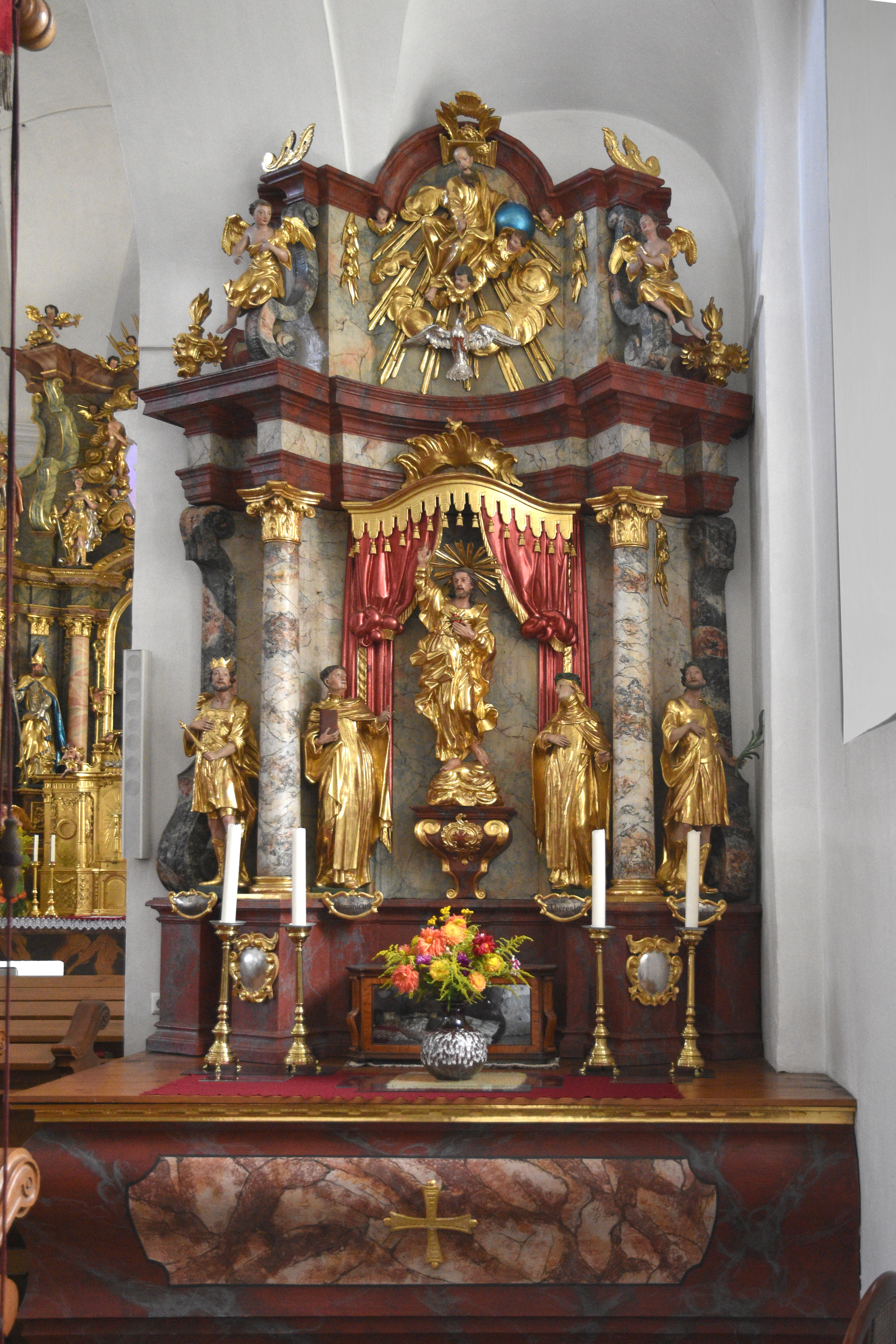
The altar of St. Catherine, the right of the two side altars.

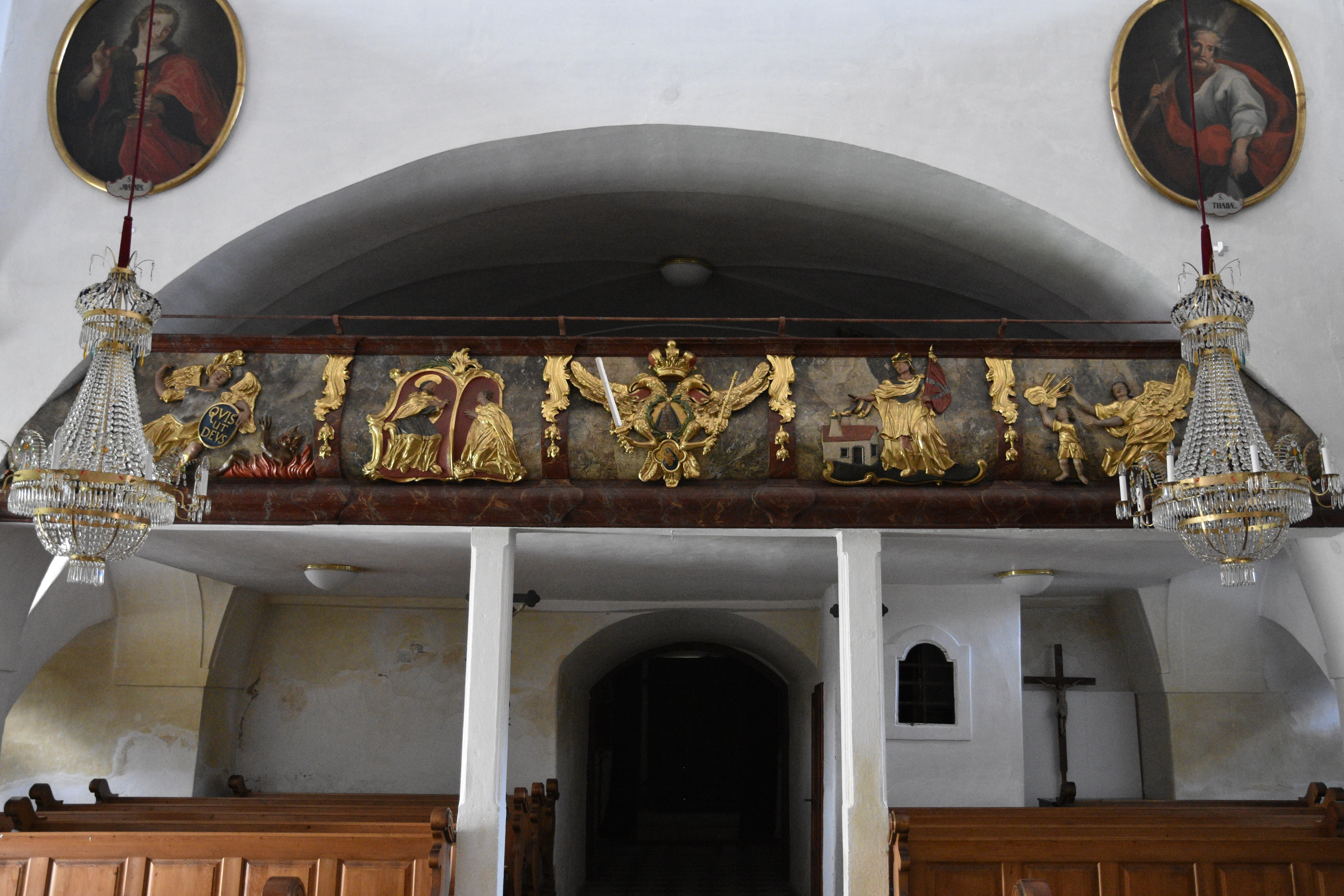
The forged choir inserted under the organ loft.

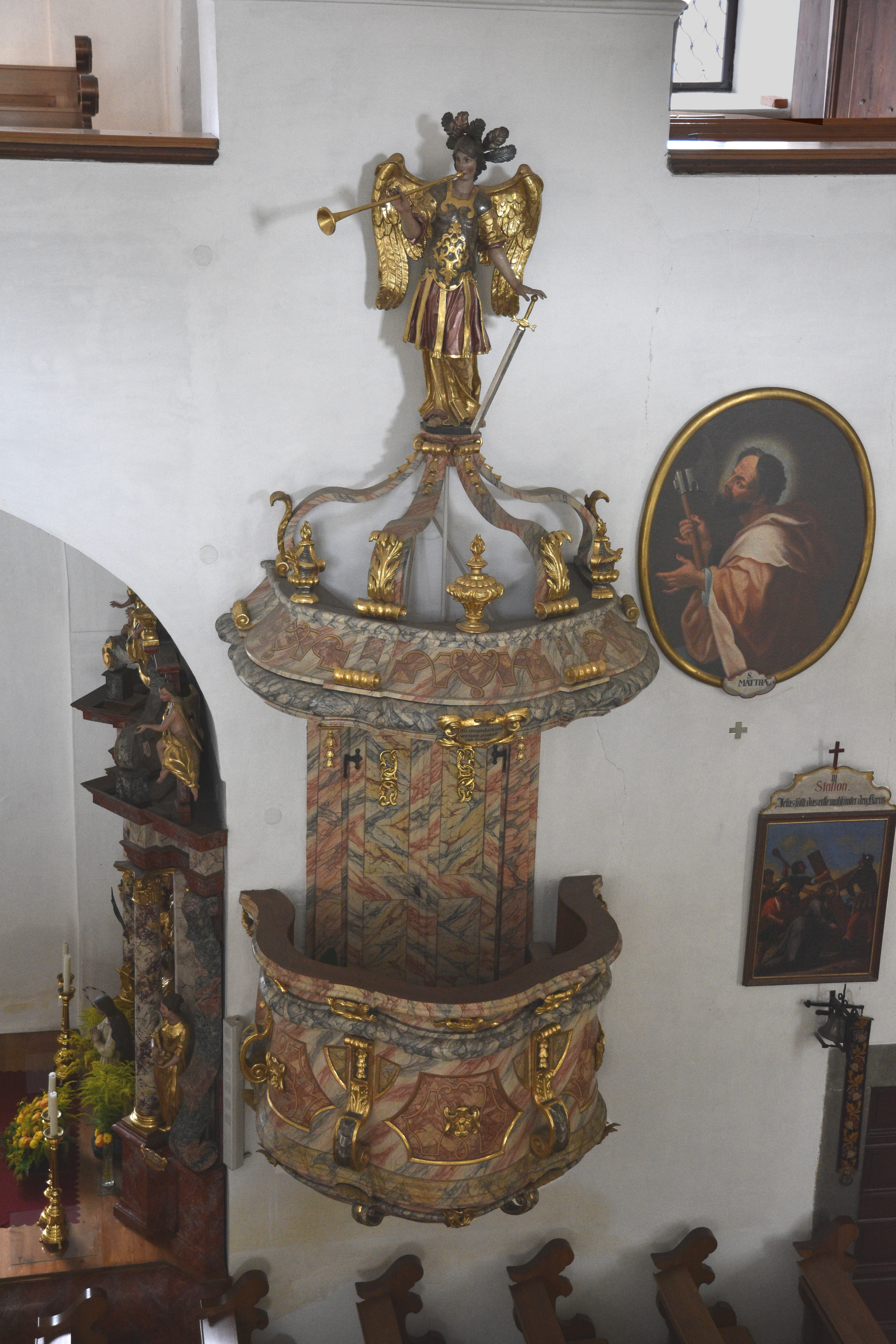
The pulpit with the figure of Archangel Michael on the sound cover.

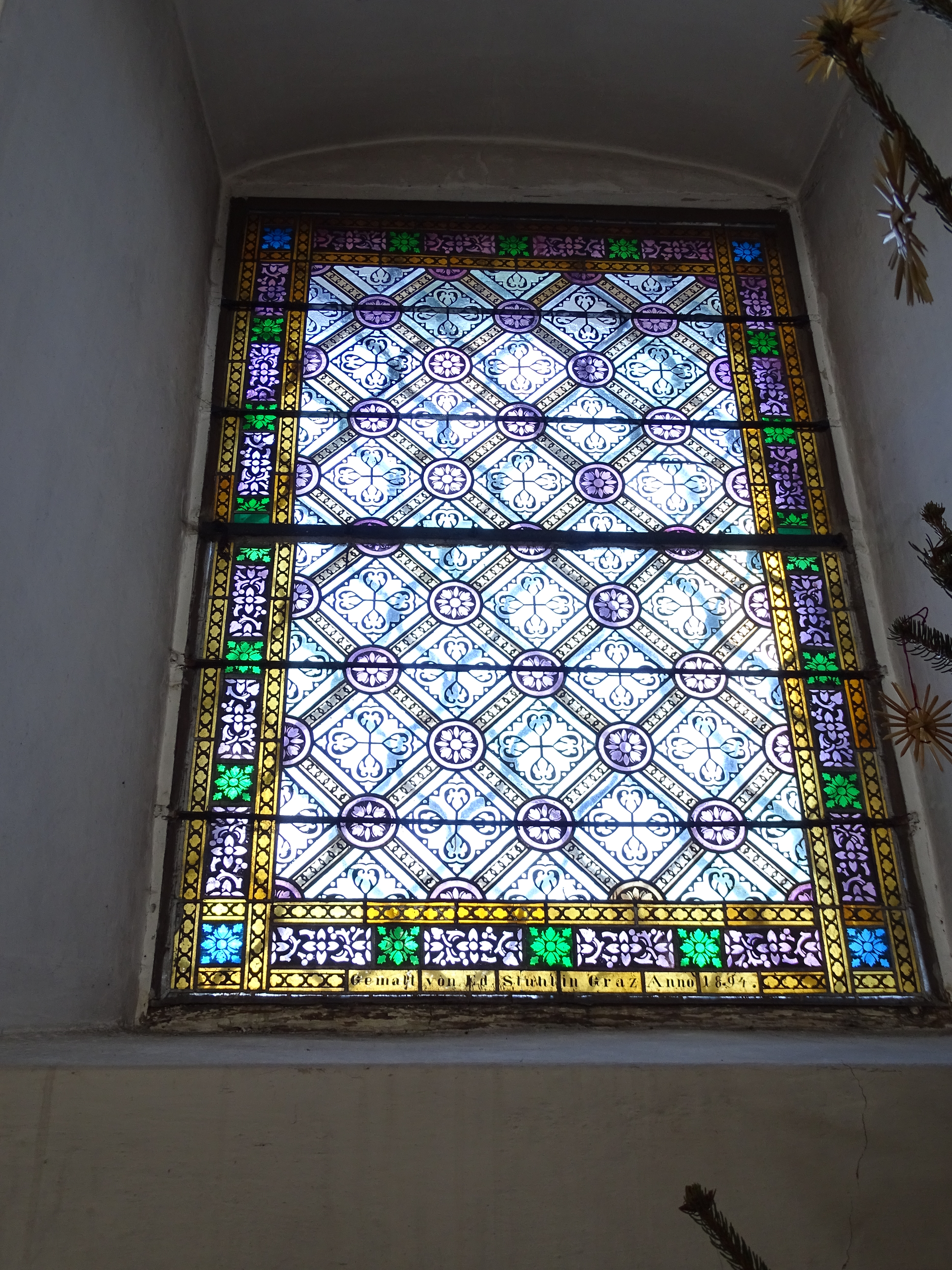
One of the leaded glass windows in the nave decorated with color ornaments.

the death register can be traced back to 1714. In the 19th century the parish was subordinated to the deanery of Köflach. Parish life in Kainach suffered greatly during the period of Nazism and the World War II. Thus, attempts were made to bring parish life to a complete standstill and there were numerous church resignations. The resistance of the Kainach parish choir allegedly even led to a complete ban on rehearsals in all parishes of the Reichsgau Styria in 1942. After the end of World War II, most of those who had left rejoined the church.

The extent of the parish area has hardly changed since the 14th century and coincides with the parish boundaries of Kainach bei Voitsberg that have been valid since the Styria municipal structural reform in 2015. The parish includes the name-giving village of Kainach bei Voitsberg as well as the villages of Breitenbach, Gallmannsegg, Hadergasse, Hemmerberg, Kohlschwarz and Oswaldgraben. In addition to the parish church, the parish also includes the filial church of St. Radegund am heiligen Wasser in Hadergasse, which was built in the mid-17th century near a supposedly healing spring. In addition, a mass chapel dedicated to St. Hubert is located near Gallmannsegg on the territory of the parish.

On Oswald of Northumbria, around August 5, a pilgrimage to Graden takes place every year. Beyond the parish boundaries, the Kainacher Umgangssonntag in July is known, when a procession is held.

The parish of Kainach belongs to a parish association, which also includes the parishes of Bärnbach and Salla.

== Reception ==
=== Legend ===
There is a legend about the plague, which is connected with the former cemetery and thus indirectly with the Kainach church, which the cemetery surrounded, and which was published among others by Walter Kainz in his book Volksdichtung aus dem Kainachtale in 1936. The young people of Kainach used to like to walk to the Pfarrerkogel on Saturday evenings, where the boys and girls met. One day in spring they sat there singing together in a farmhouse. When they looked out of the house, they saw that candles were burning at all the graves in the cemetery. They were frightened and immediately ran home. A few days later, the plague held sway in Kainach, and all the people who had gathered for the meeting at Pfarrerkogel fell victim to the plague.

=== Coat of arms ===
The municipal coat of arms, awarded on June 10, 1991, and designed by Heinrich Purkarthofer, which was valid until the merger of Kainach bei Voitsberg with other municipalities in the context of the Styrian municipal structural reform on January 1, 2015, indirectly refers to the parish church of Kainach. The blazon reads: "In red diagonally right golden a leaping lion pursuing a fleeing foal, eliminated by a golden diagonal bar each, therein diagonal pinnacles in shadow color." The colors, the gold of the sky as well as the red of the blood, stand here for the martyr George, the patron saint of the parish.

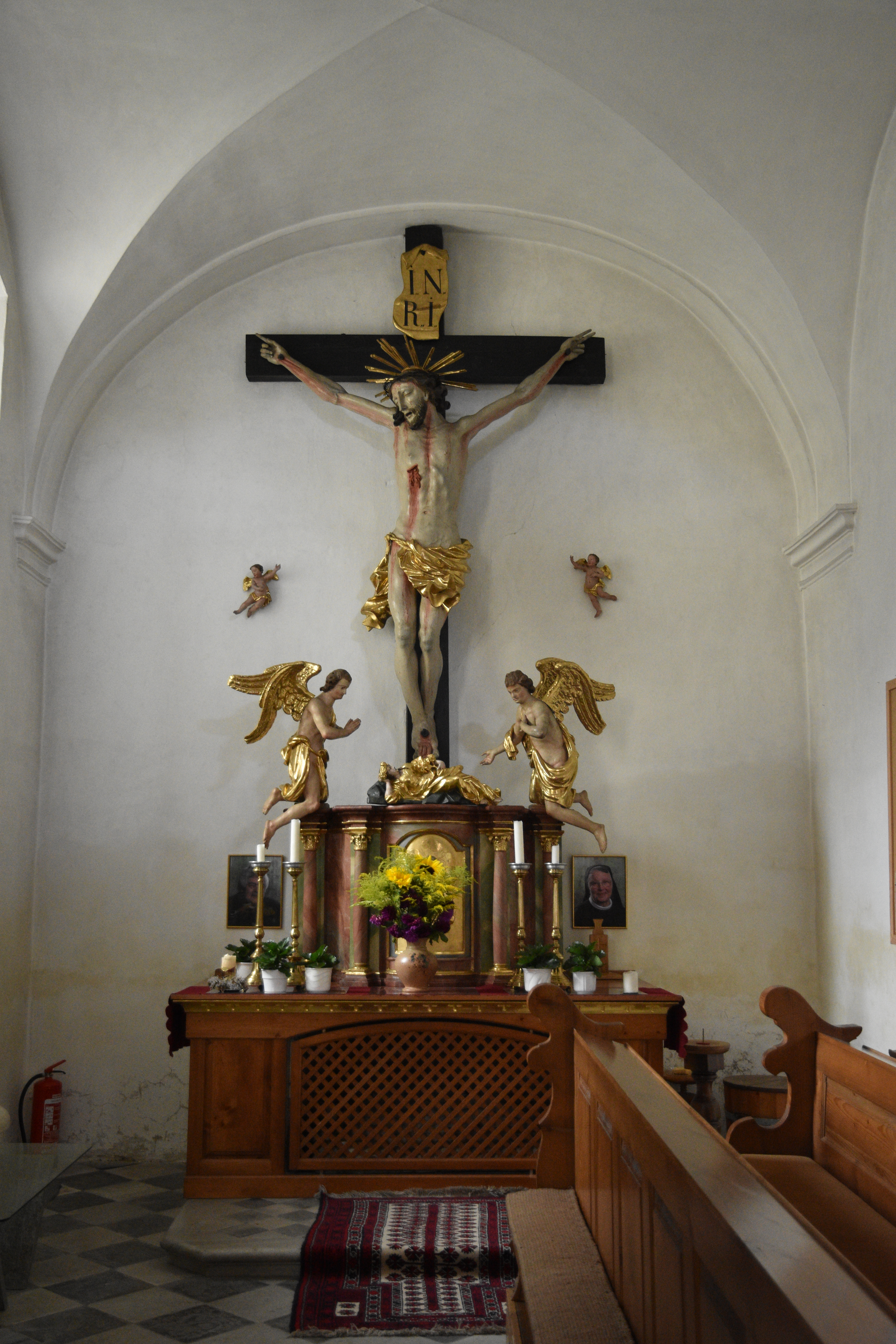
The altar of the cross in the side chapel.

The new municipal coat of arms, awarded on March 20, 2016, takes a more direct reference and shows a church representing the parish church. The blazon of this coat of arms reads: "In the shield divided by a slanting silver, black-flooded wave beam above in red silver crossed hammers and iron, below in green a silver church, its right-handed pointed-helmeted tower together with attached cross with four black pierced high rectangular windows one above the other, the nave with each black pierced gate and four rectangular windows above it." The church is the parish church.

== Bibliography ==
- Ernst Reinhold Lasnik (2006), Das obere Kainachtal. Aus der Geschichte der Gemeinden Kainach, Gallmannsegg und Kohlschwarz, Kainach/Gallmannsegg/Kohlschwarz: Gemeinde Kainach, Gemeinde Gallmannsegg, Gemeinde Kohlschwarz, pp. 52–72
- Bundesdenkmalamt, ed. (2006), Dehio Steiermark (ohne Graz) (2. ed.), Horn/Wien: Berger, p. 202, ISBN 3-85028-439-5
