= Hirschegg-Pack =

- Municipality
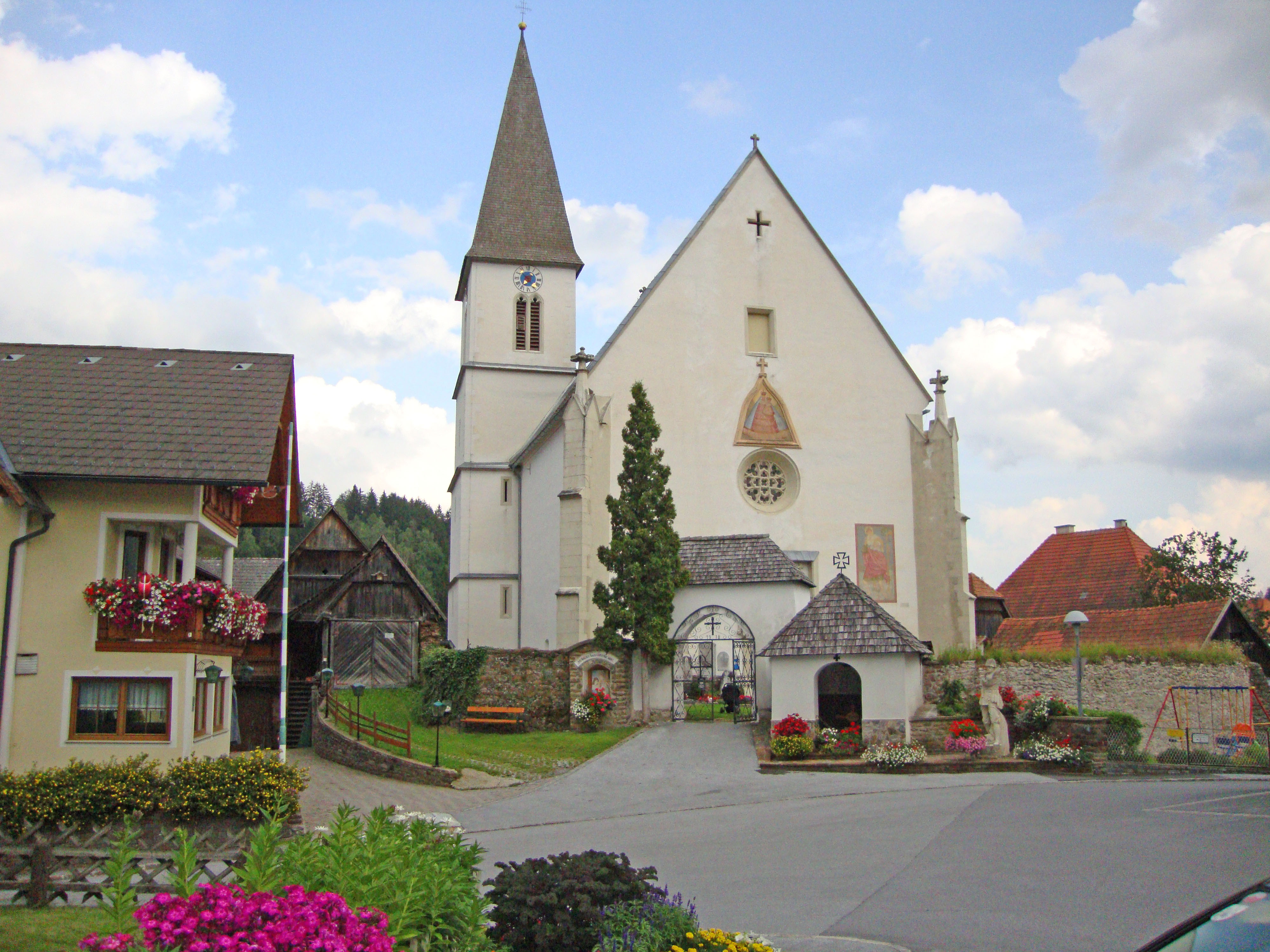
- Hirschegg parish church

- Location within Austria
- Coordinates: 47°01′12″N 14°57′30″E
- Country: Austria
- State: Styria
- District: Voitsberg

Government
  - Mayor: Johann Schmid (ÖVP)

Area
  - Total: 98.89 km^{2} (38.18 sq mi)
- Elevation: 899 m (2,949 ft)

Population (2018-01-01)
  - Total: 1,022
  - Density: 10.33/km^{2} (26.77/sq mi)
- Time zone: UTC+1 (CET)
  - Summer (DST): UTC+2 (CEST)
- Postal code: 8584, 8583, 9451
- Area code: 03141, 03145
- Website: www.hirschegg-pack.at

Hirschegg-Pack is since 2015 a municipality with 1,054 residents (as of 1 January 2016) in Voitsberg District in Styria in Austria. It was created as part of the Styria municipal structural reform, at the end of 2014, by merging the former towns Hirschegg and Pack.

== Geography ==
Pack liest west of Graz near Pack Pass, on the border between Styria and Carinthia.

== Municipality arrangement ==
The municipality territory includes the following two sections (population as of 1 January 2016):

- Hirschegg (651)
- Pack (403)

The municipality consists of the Katastralgemeinden Hirschegg-Piber, Hirschegg-Rein and Pack.

== Politics ==
The town council, with 15 members, was voted in 2015 as the following portions: 11 ÖVP, 3 SPÖ, 1 FPÖ.

Mayor

- 2018 Johann Schmid (ÖVP)
- 2015-2018 Gottfried Preßler (ÖVP)

== Culture and sights ==
Hirschegg

- Pfarrkirche Hirschegg

Pack

- Schloss Pack
- Pfarrkirche Pack
- Freiländer Alm
- Hebalm und Hebalmkapelle

== Tourism ==
The two sections Hirschegg and Pack joined with the places Edelschrott, Modriach and St. Martin am Wöllmißberg as the tourism agency Steirische Rucksackdörfer.
