= List of Michelin-starred restaurants in Austria =

As of the 2026 Michelin Guide, there are 101 restaurants in Austria with a Michelin-star rating.

The Michelin Guides have been published by the French tire company Michelin since 1900. They were designed as a guide to tell drivers about eateries they recommended to visit and to subtly sponsor their tires, by encouraging drivers to use their cars more and therefore need to replace the tires as they wore out. Over time, the stars that were given out started to become more valuable.

Multiple anonymous Michelin inspectors visit the restaurants several times. They rate the restaurants on five criteria: "quality of products", "mastery of flavor and cooking techniques", "the personality of the chef represented in the dining experience", "value for money", and "consistency between inspectors' visits". Inspectors have at least ten years of expertise and create a list of popular restaurants supported by media reports, reviews, and diner popularity. If they reach a consensus, Michelin awards restaurants from one to three stars based on its evaluation methodology: One star means "high-quality cooking, worth a stop", two stars signify "excellent cooking, worth a detour", and three stars denote "exceptional cuisine, worth a special journey". The stars are not permanent and restaurants are constantly being re-evaluated. If the criteria are not met, the restaurant will lose its stars.

The Michelin Guide has been reviewing the city of Vienna since 1983 and began reviewing Salzburg in 1986. A national edition of the Michelin Guide Austria was published from 2005 until 2009. In 2010, Vienna and Salzburg ratings were part of the Michelin Guide Main Cities of Europe edition. However, this edition was discontinued in 2020. The Michelin Guide partnered with the Austrian National Tourist Office and 8 regional tourism associations and launched a new Michelin Guide Austria in January 2025. There were no 2024 selections for Vienna and Salzburg.

== 2025–2026 nationwide lists ==
Key
1 Michelin star	One Michelin star
2 Michelin stars	Two Michelin stars
3 Michelin stars	Three Michelin stars
—	The restaurant did not receive a star that year
Closed	The restaurant is no longer open

Michelin-starred restaurants
Name	Cuisine	Location	2025	2026
[aend]	Modern	Vienna – Mariahilf	1 Michelin star	1 Michelin star
Addiert	Korean	Vienna – Innere Stadt	—	1 Michelin star
Alpin Gourmet Stube	Modern	Sankt Anton am Arlberg	1 Michelin star	1 Michelin star
Am Mahrbach	Seasonal	Königsdorf	—	1 Michelin star
Amador	Creative	Vienna – Döbling	3 Michelin stars	3 Michelin stars
Ansitz 12	Austrian	Lienz	—	1 Michelin star
APRON	Creative	Vienna – Landstraße	1 Michelin star	1 Michelin star
Artis	Creative	Graz	1 Michelin star	1 Michelin star
Atelier Fischer	Creative	Sankt Gilgen	1 Michelin star	1 Michelin star
Austria Stuben	Creative	Obergurgl	1 Michelin star	1 Michelin star
Beef Club	Modern	Fiss	1 Michelin star	1 Michelin star
Bergfried - Chef's Table	Modern	Tux	—	1 Michelin star
Berggericht	Modern	Kitzbuhel	1 Michelin star	Closed
Bootshaus	Creative	Traunkirchen	1 Michelin star	1 Michelin star
Broadmoar	Contemporary	Sankt Josef	—	1 Michelin star
Bruderherz Fine Dine	Creative	Fiss	1 Michelin star	1 Michelin star
dahoam	Austrian	Leogang	1 Michelin star	1 Michelin star
Döllerer	Alpine	Golling an der Salzach	2 Michelin stars	2 Michelin stars
Der Gannerhof	Austrian	Innervillgraten	1 Michelin star	1 Michelin star
Die Forelle	Creative	Weissensee	1 Michelin star	1 Michelin star
Die Geniesserstube im Alpenhof	Alpine	Tux	1 Michelin star	1 Michelin star
Die Weinbank	Creative	Ehrenhausen	1 Michelin star	2 Michelin stars
Doubeck	Creative	Vienna – Josefstadt	2 Michelin stars	2 Michelin stars
Edvard	Creative	Vienna – Innere Stadt	1 Michelin star	1 Michelin star
Esslokal	Creative	Hadersdorf am Kamp	1 Michelin star	1 Michelin star
Esszimmer	Creative	Salzburg	1 Michelin star	1 Michelin star
Esszimmer (Everyone's Darling)	Modern	Vienna – Innere Stadt	1 Michelin star	1 Michelin star
Gamskogelhütte Fine Dining by Stefan Lastin	Modern	Rennweg am Katschberg	—	1 Michelin star
Gaumenkitzel	Modern	Kirchberg am Wechsel	—	1 Michelin star
Geiger Alm	Creative	Altaussee	1 Michelin star	1 Michelin star
Genießerei am Markt - Steiermark(t)dinner by Alexander Posch	Modern	Graz	—	1 Michelin star
Geschwister Rauch	Creative	Bad Gleichenberg	1 Michelin star	1 Michelin star
Glasswing by Alexandru Simon	French	Vienna – Wieden	—	1 Michelin star
Gourmetrestaurant Tannenhof	Alpine	Sankt Anton am Arlberg	2 Michelin stars	2 Michelin stars
Griggeler Stuba	Modern	Lech am Arlberg	2 Michelin stars	2 Michelin stars
Gründler's Gourmet Stüberl	Austrian	Achenkirch	1 Michelin star	1 Michelin star
Guat'z Essen	Vegetarian	Stumm	1 Michelin star	1 Michelin star
Guth	Austrian	Lauterach	1 Michelin star	1 Michelin star
Harald Irka am Pfarrhof	Creative	Sankt Andrä im Sausal	1 Michelin star	1 Michelin star
Heurigenhof Bründlmayer	French	Langenlois	—	1 Michelin star
Herzig	Modern	Vienna – Rudolfsheim-Fünfhaus	1 Michelin star	1 Michelin star
Himmelreich	Contemporary	Zaußenberg	—	1 Michelin star
Hubert Wallner	Modern	Maria Wörth	1 Michelin star	1 Michelin star
Hubertusstube	Austrian	Neustift im Stubaital	1 Michelin star	1 Michelin star
Ikarus	Creative	Salzburg	2 Michelin stars	2 Michelin stars
Interalpen	Creative	Telfs	1 Michelin star	1 Michelin star
JOLA	Vegan	Vienna – Innere Stadt	—	1 Michelin star
Kammer5	Modern	Ort im Innkreis	—	1 Michelin star
Kilian Stuba	Creative	Hirschegg	1 Michelin star	1 Michelin star
Kirchenwirt	Austrian	Leogang	1 Michelin star	1 Michelin star
Kliemstein Vino Vitis	International	Linz	—	1 Michelin star
Konstantin Filippou	Modern	Vienna – Innere Stadt	2 Michelin stars	2 Michelin stars
Kräuterreich by Vitus Winkler	Creative	Sankt Veit im Pongau	2 Michelin stars	2 Michelin stars
La Fenice	Mediterranean	Lech am Arlberg	—	1 Michelin star
Landhaus Bacher	Austrian	Mautern an der Donau	2 Michelin stars	2 Michelin stars
Les Deux Kitzbühel	Modern French	Kitzbühel	1 Michelin star	1 Michelin star
Lieperts	Modern	Leutschach an der Weinstraße	1 Michelin star	1 Michelin star
Lilli Fine Dining	Contemporary	Fehring	—	1 Michelin star
Lukas Kapeller	Modern	Steyr	1 Michelin star	1 Michelin star
Lukas Restaurant	Creative	Schärding	1 Michelin star	1 Michelin star
Mangold	Austrian	Lochau	1 Michelin star	1 Michelin star
Mayer's	Austrian	Zell am See	1 Michelin star	Closed
Mesnerhaus	Austrian	Mauterndorf	1 Michelin star	1 Michelin star
Moritz	Modern	Grafenstein	1 Michelin star	1 Michelin star
Mörwald „Toni M.“	Austrian	Feuersbrunn	1 Michelin star	1 Michelin star
Mraz & Sohn	Creative	Vienna – Brigittenau	2 Michelin stars	2 Michelin stars
Obauer	Austrian	Werfen	2 Michelin stars	2 Michelin stars
Ois	Austrian	Neufelden	2 Michelin stars	2 Michelin stars
OPUS	Modern	Vienna – Innere Stadt	—	1 Michelin star
Ötztaler Stube	Modern	Sölden	1 Michelin star	1 Michelin star
Paula	Creative	Sankt Wolfgang im Salzkammergut	1 Michelin star	1 Michelin star
Paznaunerstube	Contemporary	Ischgl	1 Michelin star	1 Michelin star
Pfefferschiff	Creative	Salzburg	1 Michelin star	1 Michelin star
Pramerl & the Wolf	Creative	Vienna – Alsergrund	1 Michelin star	1 Michelin star
RAU nature	Modern	Großraming	1 Michelin star	1 Michelin star
RAR Fine Dining	Alpine, Asian	Maria Alm	—	1 Michelin star
Restaurant 141 by Joachim Jaud	Creative	Mieming	2 Michelin stars	2 Michelin stars
Rossbarth	Modern	Linz	1 Michelin star	1 Michelin star
Rote Wand Chef's Table	Modern	Lech am Arlberg	2 Michelin stars	2 Michelin stars
Rouge Noir	Creative	Weissensee	1 Michelin star	1 Michelin star
s'kammerli	Modern	Nauders	—	1 Michelin star
Sattlerhof	Creative	Gamlitz	1 Michelin star	1 Michelin star
Saziani	Creative	Straden	1 Michelin star	1 Michelin star
Schlossherrnstube	Contemporary	Ischgl	1 Michelin star	1 Michelin star
Schlosskeller Gourmetstube	Modern	Leibnitz	1 Michelin star	1 Michelin star
Schwarzer Adler	European Contemporary	Hall in Tirol	2 Michelin stars	2 Michelin stars
SENNS.Restaurant	Creative	Salzburg	2 Michelin stars	2 Michelin stars
Sigwart's Tiroler Weinstuben	Austrian	Brixlegg	1 Michelin star	Closed
Silvio Nickol Gourmet Restaurant	Modern	Vienna – Innere Stadt	2 Michelin stars	2 Michelin stars
Steirereck im Stadtpark	Creative	Vienna – Landstraße	3 Michelin stars	3 Michelin stars
Stüva	French	Ischgl	2 Michelin stars	2 Michelin stars
Tanglberg	French	Vorchdorf	1 Michelin star	1 Michelin star
Taubenkobel	French Contemporary	Schützen am Gebirge	2 Michelin stars	2 Michelin stars
Thaller	Modern	Sankt Veit am Vogau	1 Michelin star	1 Michelin star
The Glass Garden	Creative	Salzburg	1 Michelin star	1 Michelin star
TIAN	Vegetarian	Vienna – Innere Stadt	1 Michelin star	1 Michelin star
Ullrs Gourmetstube	Modern	Sankt Anton am Arlberg	—	1 Michelin star
Verdi	Creative	Linz	1 Michelin star	1 Michelin star
Waldschänke	Modern	Grieskirchen	1 Michelin star	1 Michelin star
Wörgötter	French	Ligist	1 Michelin star	1 Michelin star
ZeitRAUM	Creative	Sankt Kathrein am Offenegg	1 Michelin star	1 Michelin star
Zimmerl	Modern	Waidhofen an der Thaya	—	1 Michelin star
Zur goldenen Birn	Modern	Graz	—	1 Michelin star
Z'SOM	South American	Vienna – Wieden	1 Michelin star	1 Michelin star
Reference				

== 2010–2024 Vienna and Salzburg list ==
Key
1 Michelin star	One Michelin star
2 Michelin stars	Two Michelin stars
3 Michelin stars	Three Michelin stars
—	The restaurant did not receive a star that year
Closed	The restaurant is no longer open

Michelin-starred restaurants
Name	Cuisine	Location	2010	2011	2012	2013	2014	2015	2016	2017	2018	2019	2020	2021	2022	2023	2024 No guide
[aend]	Modern	Vienna – Mariahilf	—	—	—	—	—	—	—	—	1 Michelin star	1 Michelin star	1 Michelin star	1 Michelin star	1 Michelin star	1 Michelin star	
Amador	Creative	Vienna – Döbling	—	—	—	—	—	—	—	2 Michelin stars	2 Michelin stars	3 Michelin stars	3 Michelin stars	3 Michelin stars	3 Michelin stars	3 Michelin stars	
APRON	Creative	Vienna – Landstraße	—	—	—	—	—	—	—	—	—	—	1 Michelin star	1 Michelin star	1 Michelin star	1 Michelin star	
Blue Mustard	Modern	Vienna	—	—	—	—	—	—	—	—	1 Michelin star	Closed					
Carpe Diem	Market	Salzburg	1 Michelin star	1 Michelin star	1 Michelin star	1 Michelin star	1 Michelin star	1 Michelin star	1 Michelin star	1 Michelin star	1 Michelin star	1 Michelin star	—	—	—	—	
Das Loft	Classic	Vienna	—	—	—	—	—	—	—	—	1 Michelin star	1 Michelin star	—	—	—	—	
Dom Beisl	Viennese	Vienna	—	—	—	1 Michelin star	1 Michelin star	1 Michelin star	—	—	—	—	—	—	—	—	
Edvard	Creative	Vienna – Innere Stadt	—	—	—	—	1 Michelin star	1 Michelin star	1 Michelin star	1 Michelin star	1 Michelin star	1 Michelin star	1 Michelin star	1 Michelin star	1 Michelin star	1 Michelin star	
Esszimmer	Creative	Salzburg	1 Michelin star	1 Michelin star	1 Michelin star	1 Michelin star	1 Michelin star	1 Michelin star	1 Michelin star	1 Michelin star	1 Michelin star	1 Michelin star	1 Michelin star	1 Michelin star	1 Michelin star	1 Michelin star	
Ikarus	Creative	Salzburg	1 Michelin star	1 Michelin star	1 Michelin star	1 Michelin star	1 Michelin star	1 Michelin star	2 Michelin stars	2 Michelin stars	2 Michelin stars	2 Michelin stars	2 Michelin stars	1 Michelin star	1 Michelin star	2 Michelin stars	
Kilian Stuba	Creative	Hirschegg	—	—	—	—	—	—	—	—	—	—	—	—	—	1 Michelin star	
Konstantin Filippou	Modern	Vienna – Innere Stadt	—	—	—	—	1 Michelin star	1 Michelin star	1 Michelin star	1 Michelin star	2 Michelin stars	2 Michelin stars	2 Michelin stars	2 Michelin stars	2 Michelin stars	2 Michelin stars	
Le Ciel by Toni Mörwald	Classic	Vienna	—	—	—	—	—	—	1 Michelin star	1 Michelin star	1 Michelin star	1 Michelin star	1 Michelin star	Closed			
Magazin	Classic	Salzburg	1 Michelin star	1 Michelin star	—	—	—	—	—	—	—	—	—	—	—	—	
Mraz & Sohn	Creative	Vienna – Brigittenau	1 Michelin star	1 Michelin star	1 Michelin star	1 Michelin star	1 Michelin star	1 Michelin star	2 Michelin stars	2 Michelin stars	2 Michelin stars	2 Michelin stars	2 Michelin stars	2 Michelin stars	2 Michelin stars	2 Michelin stars	
Novelli	Creative	Vienna	1 Michelin star	1 Michelin star	1 Michelin star	—	—	—	—	—	—	—	—	—	—	—	
OPUS	Modern	Vienna	—	—	—	—	—	—	1 Michelin star	1 Michelin star	1 Michelin star	—	—	—	—	—	
Pfefferschiff	Creative	Salzburg	1 Michelin star	1 Michelin star	1 Michelin star	1 Michelin star	1 Michelin star	1 Michelin star	1 Michelin star	1 Michelin star	1 Michelin star	1 Michelin star	1 Michelin star	1 Michelin star	1 Michelin star	1 Michelin star	
Pramerl & the Wolf	Creative	Vienna – Alsergrund	—	—	—	—	—	—	—	—	1 Michelin star	1 Michelin star	1 Michelin star	1 Michelin star	1 Michelin star	1 Michelin star	
Riedenburg	Classic	Salzburg	1 Michelin star	1 Michelin star	1 Michelin star	—	—	—	—	—	—	—	—	—	—	—	
SENNS.Restaurant	Creative	Salzburg	—	—	—	—	—	1 Michelin star	2 Michelin stars	2 Michelin stars	2 Michelin stars	2 Michelin stars	2 Michelin stars	2 Michelin stars	2 Michelin stars	2 Michelin stars	
SHIKI	Japanese	Vienna	—	—	—	—	—	—	—	—	1 Michelin star	1 Michelin star	1 Michelin star	1 Michelin star	1 Michelin star	—	
Silvio Nickol Gourmet Restaurant	Modern	Vienna – Innere Stadt	—	—	2 Michelin stars	2 Michelin stars	2 Michelin stars	2 Michelin stars	2 Michelin stars	2 Michelin stars	2 Michelin stars	2 Michelin stars	2 Michelin stars	2 Michelin stars	2 Michelin stars	2 Michelin stars	
Steirereck im Stadtpark	Creative	Vienna – Landstraße	2 Michelin stars	2 Michelin stars	2 Michelin stars	2 Michelin stars	2 Michelin stars	2 Michelin stars	2 Michelin stars	2 Michelin stars	2 Michelin stars	2 Michelin stars	2 Michelin stars	2 Michelin stars	2 Michelin stars	2 Michelin stars	
The Glass Garden	Creative	Salzburg	—	—	—	—	—	—	—	—	—	—	1 Michelin star	1 Michelin star	1 Michelin star	1 Michelin star	
TIAN	Vegetarian	Vienna – Innere Stadt	—	—	—	—	1 Michelin star	1 Michelin star	1 Michelin star	1 Michelin star	1 Michelin star	1 Michelin star	1 Michelin star	1 Michelin star	1 Michelin star	1 Michelin star	
Vincent	Traditional	Vienna	—	—	—	—	1 Michelin star	1 Michelin star	—	—	—	—	—	—	—	—	
Walter Bauer	Viennese	Vienna	1 Michelin star	1 Michelin star	1 Michelin star	1 Michelin star	1 Michelin star	1 Michelin star	1 Michelin star	1 Michelin star	1 Michelin star	1 Michelin star	1 Michelin star	1 Michelin star	1 Michelin star	— (Note: Walter Bauer transitioned to Duchardt under new name and management)	
Zur Plainlinde	Regional	Salzburg	1 Michelin star	—	—	—	—	—	—	—	—	—	—	—	—	—	
Reference																	

== 2005–2009 nationwide list ==
Key
1 Michelin star	One Michelin star
2 Michelin stars	Two Michelin stars
—	The restaurant did not receive a star that year

Michelin-starred restaurants
Name	Cuisine	Location	2005	2006	2007	2008	2009
Korso	Austrian	Vienna – Karlsplatz		1 Michelin star	1 Michelin star	—	—
Mraz & Sohn	Creative	Vienna – Brigittenau	—	—	1 Michelin star	1 Michelin star	1 Michelin star
Restaurant Coburg	French	Vienna – Coburg		1 Michelin star	1 Michelin star	1 Michelin star	—
RieGi	International	Vienna	—	—	1 Michelin star	1 Michelin star	1 Michelin star
Steirereck im Stadtpark	Creative	Vienna – Landstraße		1 Michelin star	1 Michelin star	2 Michelin stars	2 Michelin stars
Walter Bauer	Viennese	Vienna	—	—	1 Michelin star	1 Michelin star	1 Michelin star
Reference							

== See also ==
- List of restaurants in Vienna

== Bibliography ==
- Michelin Guide Main Cities of Europe 2006. Michelin. 2006. ISBN 978-2-06-711579-8.
- Michelin Guide Main Cities of Europe 2007. Michelin. 2007. ISBN 978-2-06-712247-5.
- Michelin Guide Main Cities of Europe 2008. Michelin. 2008. ISBN 978-2-06-713019-7.
- Michelin Guide Main Cities of Europe 2009. Michelin. 2009. ISBN 978-2-06-713826-1.
- Michelin Guide Main Cities of Europe 2010. Michelin. 2010. ISBN 978-2-06-714682-2.
- Michelin Guide Main Cities of Europe 2011. Michelin. 2011. ISBN 978-2-06-715347-9.
- Michelin Guide Main Cities of Europe 2012. Michelin. 2012. ISBN 978-2-06-716976-0.
- Michelin Guide Main Cities of Europe 2013. Michelin. 2013. ISBN 978-2-06-718069-7.
- Michelin Guide Main Cities of Europe 2014. Michelin. 2014. ISBN 978-2-06-718904-1.
- Michelin Guide Main Cities of Europe 2015. Michelin. 2015. ISBN 978-2-06-719701-5.
- Michelin Guide Main Cities of Europe 2016. Michelin. 2016. ISBN 978-2-06-720638-0.
- Michelin Guide Main Cities of Europe 2017. Michelin. 2017. ISBN 978-2-06-721475-0.
- Michelin Guide Main Cities of Europe 2018. Michelin. 2018. ISBN 978-2-06-722378-3.
- Michelin Guide Main Cities of Europe 2019. Michelin. 2019. ISBN 978-2-06-723050-7.
- Michelin Guide Main Cities of Europe 2020. Michelin. 2020. ISBN 978-2-06-724190-9.
