= Burg Krems =

Castle in Styria, Austria

Coordinates: 47°01′51″N 15°10′55″E

- Styria, Austria
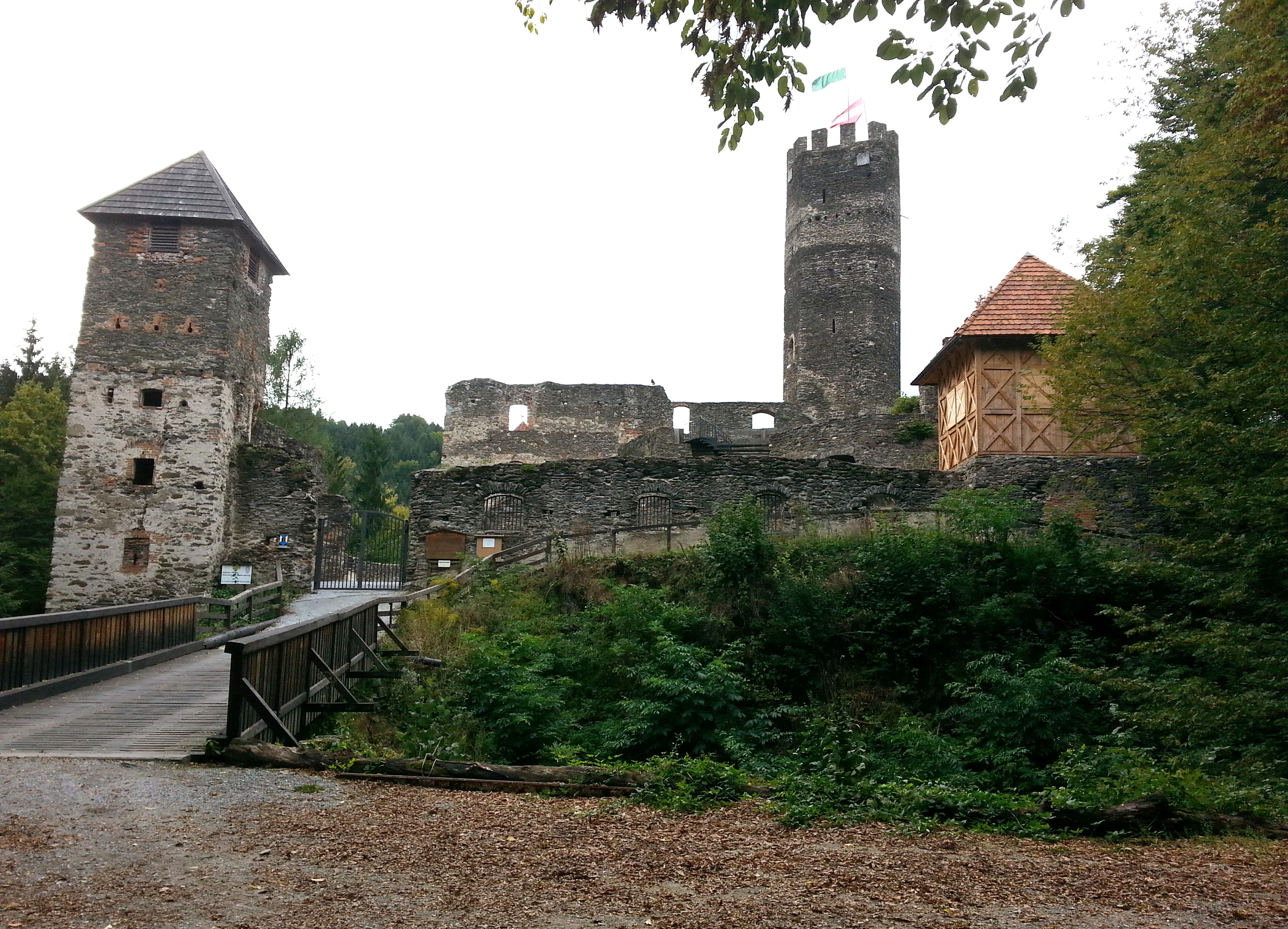

Site information
- Type: Castle

Burg Krems is a castle in Styria, Austria. Burg Krems is 330 metres (1,080 ft) above sea level.

The ruins of Krems Castle are located east of the municipality of Voitsberg in Styria in the district of Krems. The history of the castle dates back to the 11th or 12th century, when the Archbishop of Salzburg had it built. It was first mentioned in a document in 1248. Krems was owned several times by larger noble families, who, however, usually entrusted caretakers or administrators with the administration of the dominion. In the 14th century Krems held the lower jurisdiction and in the 16th century the castle was expanded into a Renaissance palace with a zoo. In the 17th century, Count Karl Saurau acquired the estate and merged it with his dominion of Ligist. After transferring the administration to Ligist Castle in 1730, he neglected Krems and left it to decay. In 1817, part of the castle slid down after a rainstorm. In 1857 it was bought by Archduke Johann.

On 20 March 1936, the ruins were declared a listed building and the site was secured and made accessible. A castle association carried out renovation work in the 1960s. Since 1988, Krems Castle has been owned by the association Licht im Leben (Light in Life). Since 1993, it has been restored by the newly founded castle association. Among other things, a path was built around the ruins and the keep was made accessible again. A small museum room opened in May 2015 shows the history of Krems Castle.

The castle complex is the ruin of a hilltop castle on an advanced ridge. The five-storey keep built on a rock is a prominent feature of the castle and can be seen from afar. In the south of the complex is a residential tower with two adjoining residential buildings. A ring wall runs around the entire area, some of which has embrasures. The outer castle in front of the core castle to the north is considered the youngest part of the complex. It has two small corner towers, one of which has been preserved in its full height.

== Name ==
The name Krems does not originate from the Slavic language like other place names from the immediate vicinity, but is probably of older origin. According to local historian Walter Kienreich, the name could derive from the Indo-Germanic (s)krem, the Illyrian Kremisia or the Celtic Chremisa. All these words mean something like sharp, cutting, sharp stone or rocky cliff. This could refer to the ridge on which the castle is situated and which forces the Kainach into a narrow valley.

== Location ==
The castle ruins stand on high settlement land, a ridge south of Thallein that advances towards the Kainach. The ridge slopes steeply to the east, south and west and has been separated from the hinterland by a deep cut since the extension of the Kainach valley road. The steep slopes were partly artificially embanked and the terrain surrounding the ruin was prepared for defence in sections by artificial interventions. However, these artificial interventions in the terrain have been partly destroyed by a recently constructed circuitous path. To the north, a sectional ditch separates the castle area from the hinterland. This ditch is spanned by a modern bridge, the remains of which have been preserved.

== History ==
Perhaps as early as the 11th century, at the latest in the middle of the 12th century, a simple fortified building, probably made of wood, was erected on the site of today's castle by order of the Archbishop of Salzburg. A knightly dynasty of Krems is first mentioned around 1150. Probably at the beginning of the 13th century, the wooden building was replaced by one made of stone. After Otto's death in 1234, the castle passed via his widow to Hartnit von Rabenstein, who had it administered by his servants, who called themselves after the castle. In 1248, the castle is first mentioned by name as castrum Chremse, as it served as the seat of a noble assembly at which Ulrich von Wildon mediated a settlement between Admont Abbey and Hartnid, Schänken von Rannstein. At that time, the front part around the keep was considered a fief of the Archbishop of Salzburg, while the rear or southern part of the castle was a freehold of the lord of the castle. [3] Since the Rabensteiners took part in the Styrian noble uprising, the Landsberg League, against Duke Albrecht, they lost all their possessions, and Krems came to the Lords of Walsee around 1300, who appointed castle lords. In 1363, Eberhard V of Walsee sold the castle to Leutold of Stadeck. After the Stadeckers died out, the Counts Haug and Ulrich of Montfort came into possession of the castle by marriage around 1400. As the indebted Counts of Montfort had to sell goods, the castle and the dominion came into the possession of Baron Sigmund Friedrich von Herberstein in 1589.

In the 14th century, the Amt Obergraden and the Amt Gößnitz came under the Lordship of Krems, which at that time included peasant subjects in Gasselberg, Klein-Gaisfeld, Lobming, on the Muggauberg and in Thallein, as well as the Amt Modriach, Pack and Salla. In those days the lordship had a large keep in which the lord of the castle exercised the lower jurisdiction and the provincial judge was not allowed to intervene without permission. Criminals were handed over to the provincial judge in Voitsberg.

Under Sigmund and later also under his son Otto Heinrich von Herberstein, the castle complex was extended and splendidly furnished as a Renaissance palace until 1623. Otto had a large zoo laid out under the castle and enlarged the dominion through purchases. As he was heavily in debt due to the expansion, he had to sell the castle and his dominion of Krems to Maximilian Leymann von Liebenau in 1629. As Liebenau was unable to pay the purchase price, he had to sell Krems to Baron Salomon von Meillegg in 1634. Meillegg had the complex rebuilt. As Meillegg did not have enough money either, Count Karl Saurau, the governor of Styria at the time, had the manor seized. This enabled him to acquire the demesne and connected it with his demesne of Ligist. Meillegg completely cleared out the richly furnished castle, although it had been sold together with the furnishings, before taking it over. He took all the furnishings of value with him, including gilded wallpaper and the entire contents of the armoury. The furnishings taken illegally by Meillegg were worth about one million shillings. In letters he apologised to Saurau for this and made excuses about his poverty as well as the maintenance of his many children, which meant that he was not punished. Saurau had Krems inhabited by a steward. In the following years the estate was neglected. In 1730 the administration was transferred to Ligist Castle and Krems was inhabited only by servants. The complex was left to decay. By 1790, the forests of the manor had been cleared, the own grounds were uncultivated and the income leased out. At about the same time, the Gamilllschegg and Neitter tradesmen wanted to buy and renovate the castle, but the purchase price and restoration costs were too high for them. In 1817, after a rainstorm, part of the castle slid down the south-eastern side. Archduke John of Austria, who also owned the ironworks in Krems, acquired the manor in 1857. From 1869 the ruin was owned by the Vordernberg-Köflacher Montan Industrie Gesellschaft, from 1877 by Countess Anna von Saurau, from 1880 by the cellulose manufacturer Klusemann, then by the Steiermärkisch-Salzburgische Holzwerke AG.

On 20 March 1936, the ruins were declared a listed building, whereupon work began on securing the site and making it accessible. The Steiermärkisch-Salzburgische Holzwerke AG was followed by the Töscher family of innkeepers as owners. In the 1960s, a Krems Castle Association was formed, which carried out renovation work on the castle complex. Since 1988 Krems Castle has been owned by the Licht im Leben association. Since 1993 the re-founded Krems Castle Association has been taking care of the maintenance of the site. In the winter of 1998/99 a path was laid along the outer wall, and between 1999/2000 the keep was renovated and made accessible again. In 2011, the wall stump of the north-eastern corner tower of the outer bailey was covered with a wooden construction by the Voitsberg rural youth. The history of the castle complex can be viewed in a small museum room opened in May 2015.

== Description ==
Floor plan of castle Krems from Otto Piper’s “Österreichische Burgen” (1908)

The oldest preserved part of the hilltop castle is located in the western part of the complex, directly at the five-storey keep on a hill directly on the steep slope. The mighty keep, built on an isolated rock block, has a bearing-like, uniform quarry stone masonry, which indicates that it was built in the 13th century. The western side of the tower has a semicircular and the eastern side an irregular polygonal ground plan. The original entrance was via the first floor at a height of about eight metres. It has partially broken-out Romanesque jambs made of ashlar. The door on the ground floor was only broken out in more recent times. Originally, the ground floor could only be reached through a hole in the vault. Both the ground floor and the first floor have vaulted ceilings. From the first floor, a staircase in the wall thickness leads to the first floor. It can be seen from the wall offsets that the second and third upper floors used to have a beamed ceiling. All floors are lit by light slits. The third floor probably had a balcony. This is indicated by a doorway facing south. The keep has been renovated and can be climbed to a platform. The uppermost platform is surrounded by battlements and also forms the fourth upper storey. On the wall of the keep there is an inscription with the date 1623, which refers to the extension by the noble family of Herberstein. The wall remains to the north and south of the keep have mostly the same masonry as the keep.

The complex is surrounded by a ring wall from the 14th or 15th century. The wall in the south-western part has two embrasures in which two recumbent countersunk embrasures carved from a single workpiece have been preserved. They are probably Roman spolia, the exact origin of which is not known. They may have come from funerary monuments erected along the Roman road running nearby. While the wall on the courtyard side in the west of the castle is largely buried, it rises to heights of three metres above the ground towards the outside. Only the lowest stone courses of the eastern wall date from the 14th/15th century. The upper part dates from a later phase in the 16th century, recognisable by a different structure of the masonry. At that time, a semicircular flanking tower was built into the wall. To the north of this tower, in the inner courtyard, there were two superimposed battlements with embrasures for muskets. Of the battlements, only the wall landings are still preserved.

In the south, the castle complex is completed by a square tower with bearing quarry stone masonry from the 14th century. In the 16th or 17th century, flat-arched niches with large windows were built into it. It was used as a residential tower. The niche of a spiral staircase on the northern outer wall probably dates from the same period. Two residential buildings adjoin the square tower to the north. The north-western, five-storey building served as a palace and dates from the 14th to 15th century. The second building dates from the 16th/17th century and probably had courtyard arcades.

In the 16th century, a connecting wing was built between the eastern ring wall and the old structure to the east of the keep with irregular, barely storable quarry stone masonry interspersed with bricks. Through this wing, a gateway leads from the northern, new castle courtyard into the southern, older inner courtyard. The inner courtyard is bordered to the east and west by the curtain wall, to the south by two residential buildings and to the north by the hill with the keep. Above the tract with the gate hall, there were probably two storeys with living quarters in former times. The storeys had rectangular windows in flat-arched niches, which are still recognisable.

In the north, the complex is completed by the outer bailey, which was built in the late 16th century as a transverse wing. It is the youngest part of the complex. At the corners of the outer bailey there were two small square towers, of which the north-eastern one has been preserved in its full height. This tower has brick keyhole embrasures. The northeastern tower is preserved as a wall stump and was covered over in 2011 with a wooden construction based on a depiction in a 17th-century copperplate engraving. In the outer bailey there was a small garden and a large horse stable attached to the ring wall. In the north of the outer bailey there is a neck ditch which was spanned by a fixed bridge from more recent times. Only the pillars of this bridge are still preserved.

The water supply was first managed by a cistern, later by a well. The water was piped into the castle through wooden pipes from Thallein.

== Reception ==
=== Coat of Arms ===
The keep of Krems Castle is depicted on the municipal coat of arms of Lobming, an independent municipality until 1968, designed by Dr. Reiner Putschnig on 1 August 1964. The description of the coat of arms reads: In a blue shield with a flooded, water-coloured shield base in silver on a three-mountain a pewtered castle with a three-tined, slender keep standing in the middle.

=== Mythology ===
According to legend, robber barons once lived at Krems Castle. On his wedding night, a white woman with long black gloves appeared to the lord of the castle. He interpreted this as a bad omen, which proved to be correct a few days later when his young bride died.

== See also ==
- List of castles in Austria
