= Gößnitz, Styria =

Gößnitz
- Former municipality
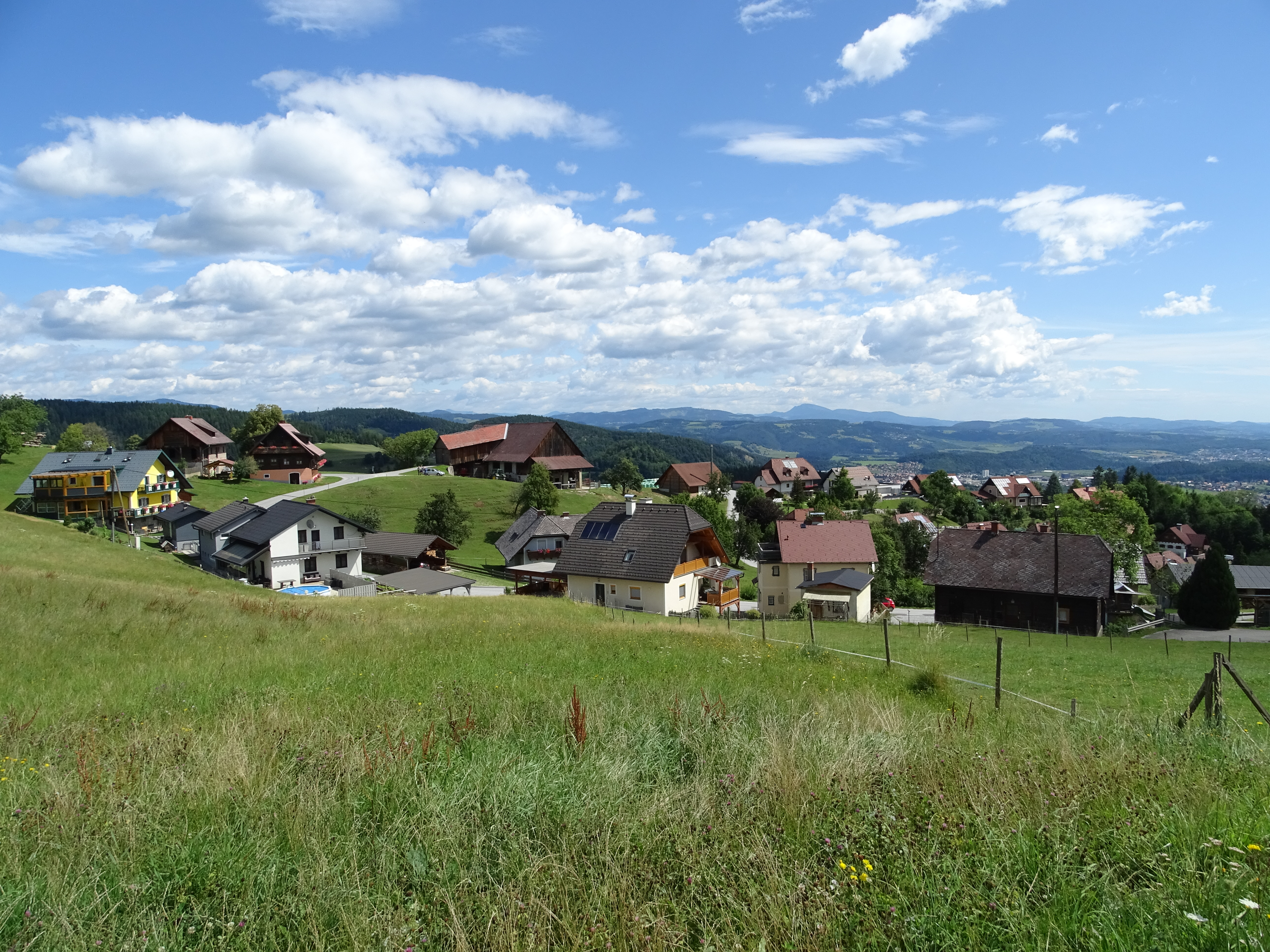
- View of Gößnitz

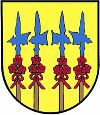
- Coat of arms

- Location within Austria
- Coordinates: 47°03′01″N 15°01′27″E
- Country: Austria
- State: Styria
- District: Voitsberg

Area
  - Total: 31.03 km^{2} (11.98 sq mi)
- Elevation: 780 m (2,560 ft)

Population (1 January 2016)
  - Total: 441
  - Density: 14.2/km^{2} (36.8/sq mi)
- Time zone: UTC+1 (CET)
  - Summer (DST): UTC+2 (CEST)
- Postal code: 8591
- Area code: 03144
- Vehicle registration: VO
- Website: www.goessnitz. steiermark.at

Gößnitz is a former municipality in the district of Voitsberg in the Austrian state of Styria. Since the 2015 Styria municipal structural reform, it is part of the municipality Maria Lankowitz.
