= Piberegg =

- Former municipality
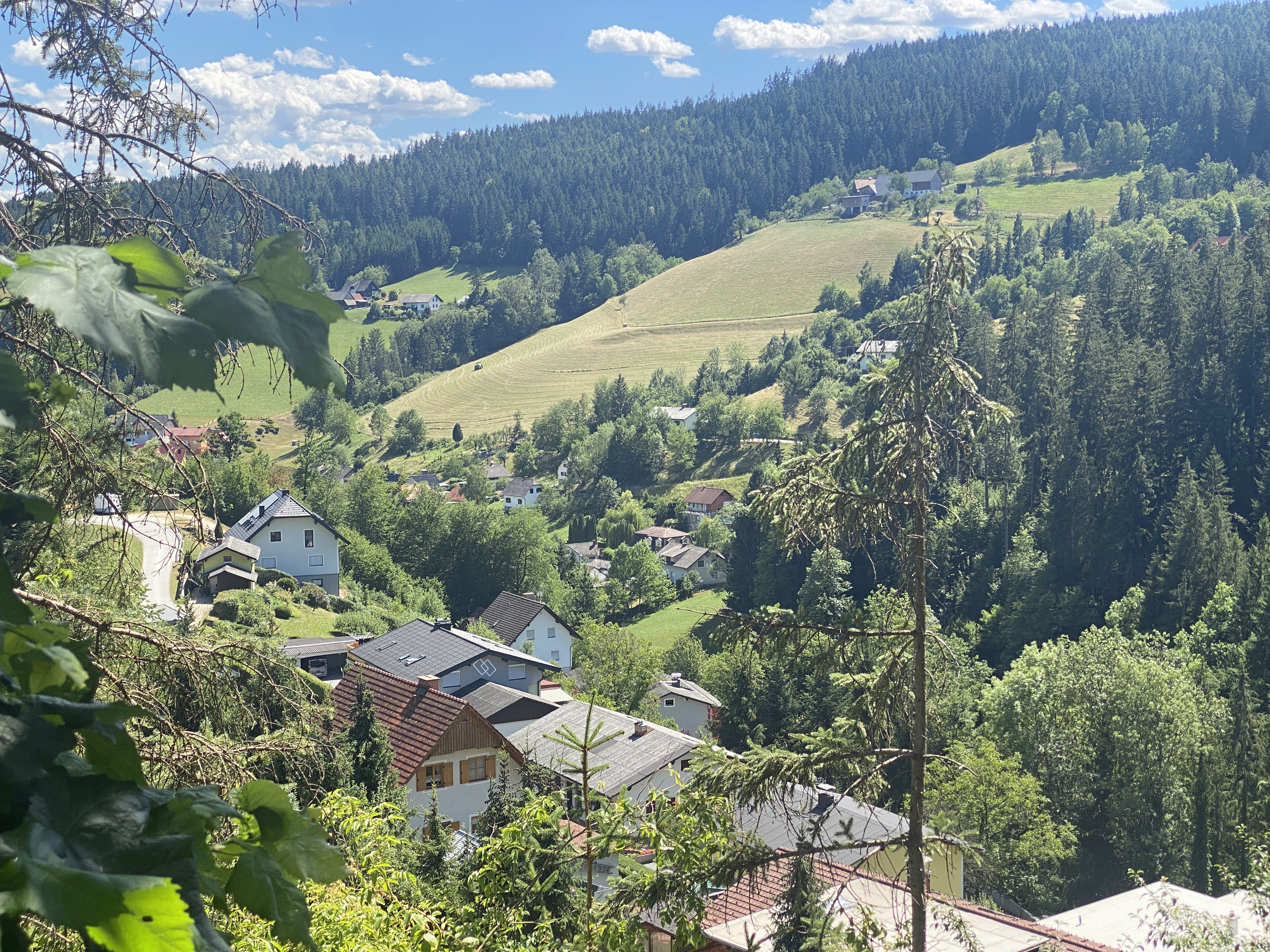
- View of Piberegg

- Coat of arms

- Location within Austria
- Coordinates: 47°05′45″N 15°06′57″E
- Country: Austria
- State: Styria
- District: Voitsberg

Area
  - Total: 14.38 km^{2} (5.55 sq mi)
- Elevation: 460 m (1,510 ft)

Population (1 January 2016)
  - Total: 367
  - Density: 25.5/km^{2} (66.1/sq mi)
- Time zone: UTC+1 (CET)
  - Summer (DST): UTC+2 (CEST)
- Postal code: 8572
- Area code: 03142
- Vehicle registration: VO
- Website: www.piberegg. steiermark.at

Piberegg is a former municipality in the district of Voitsberg in the Austrian state of Styria. Since the 2015 Styria municipal structural reform, it is part of the municipality Bärnbach.

== Geography ==
Piberegg lies west of Graz.
