= Saturninia gens =

Ancient Roman family

The gens Saturninia was an obscure plebeian family of ancient Rome. Few members of this gens are mentioned by Roman writers, but several are known from inscriptions. The most illustrious of the Saturninii was Saturninius Secundinus, governor of various provinces and praetorian prefect under the emperors of the mid-fourth century.

== Origin ==
The nomen Saturninius belongs to a large class of gentilicia formed from existing names ending in -inus using the suffix -inius. It is formed from the surname Saturninus, a cognomen of very frequent occurrence, from which it must be carefully distinguished; the genitive of each may be written Saturnini. Saturninus is derived from Saturnus, the name of the god.

== Members ==
This list includes abbreviated praenomina. For an explanation of this practice, see filiation.

- Lucius Saturninius, named in an inscription from Rome, dating from 20 BC.
- Gaius Saturninius Maternus, made an offering to the local goddesses at the site of modern Burgel, formerly part of Germania Inferior, dating between the second half of the first century, and the end of the second.
- Marcus Saturninius, named along with Spurius Saturninius in a bronze inscription from Pompeii in Campania.
- Spurius Saturninius, named along with Marcus Saturninius in a bronze inscription from Pompeii.
- Saturninia, dedicated a second-century tomb at Treveri in Gallia Belgica for her son, Andecarius Augustus.
- Marcus Saturninius Lupulus, one of the Seviri Augustales, made a second- or third-century offering to the goddess Nehalennia at Colonia Claudia Ara Agrippinensium in Germania Inferior.
- Lucius Saturninius Victor, made a second- or third-century offering to the local goddesses at Colonia Claudia Ara Agrippinensium.
- Publius Saturninus P. f., made an offering to Guddul at Hadrumetum in Africa Proconsularis, dating from the latter half of the second century.
- Saturninius Privatus, buried at Burdigala in Gallia Aquitania, aged thirty-seven, in a tomb dedicated by his wife, Julia Epomima, dating between the latter half of the second century and the early part of the third.
- Gaius Saturninius Candidus, one of several Roman citizens living near Carnuntum in Pannonia Superior in AD 159, named in an inscription paying tribute to Jupiter Optimus Maximus, the emperor Antoninus Pius, and his heir, Marcus Aurelius.
- Saturninius Verinus, along with his wife, Aurelia Secundina, dedicated a family sepulchre dating from the late second or early third century, at the site of modern Stallhofen, formerly part of Noricum, for themselves and their son, Aurelius.
- Saturninia Atturita, buried at Burdigala, aged forty-one, in a tomb dating from the first half of the third century.
- Titus Saturninius Aurelius, together with his wife, Junia Lucilla, and several others, made a donation to the college of haruspices at Mogontiacum in Germania Superior, dating from the first half of the third century.
- Saturninia, the wife of Gaius Sentius Natalis, signifer of the Legio II Adiutrix, with whom she made an offering to the imperial cult at Aquincum in Pannonia Inferior in AD 219.
- Saturninius Secundus, also known as Salutius, was a senator who served as praeses, or governor of Aquitania, proconsul of Africa, and praetorian prefect, for which the emperors Valentinian and Valens dedicated a gilded statue in his honour, dating between AD 365 and 367. He authored a late work on the Greek gods.

=== Undated Saturnini ===
- Lucius Saturninius, named along with Marcus Saturninius in a pottery inscription from Brundisium in Calabria.
- Marcus Saturninius, named along with Lucius Saturninius in a pottery inscription from Brundisium.
- Publius Saturninius, named in a bronze inscription from Neapolis in Campania.
- Titus Saturninius, named in an inscription from Gemellae in Numidia.
- Saturninia Secunda, buried at Thabarbusis in Africa Proconsularis, modern Ain Nechma in Algeria. Her age is partially preserved as [...XX] years, possibly thirty or seventy.
- Gaius Saturninius Viriaucus, made an offering to Mercury Excingiorigiatis and Rosmerta at the site of modern Ueß, formerly part of Germania Superior.

== See also ==
- List of Roman gentes

== Bibliography ==
- Annona Epigraphica Austriaca (Epigraphy of Austria Annual, abbreviated AEA) (1979–present).
- René Cagnat et alii, L'Année épigraphique (The Year in Epigraphy, abbreviated AE), Presses Universitaires de France (1888–present).
- George Davis Chase, "The Origin of Roman Praenomina", in Harvard Studies in Classical Philology, vol. VIII, pp. 103–184 (1897).
- Hermann Finke, "Neue Inschriften", in Berichte der Römisch-Germanischen Kommission, vol. xvii, pp. 1–107, 198–231 (1927).
- Stéphane Gsell, Inscriptions Latines de L'Algérie (Latin Inscriptions from Algeria, abbreviated ILAlg), Edouard Champion, Paris (1922–present).
- Theodor Mommsen et alii, Corpus Inscriptionum Latinarum (The Body of Latin Inscriptions, abbreviated CIL), Berlin-Brandenburgische Akademie der Wissenschaften (1853–present).
