= Gallmannsegg =

- Former municipality
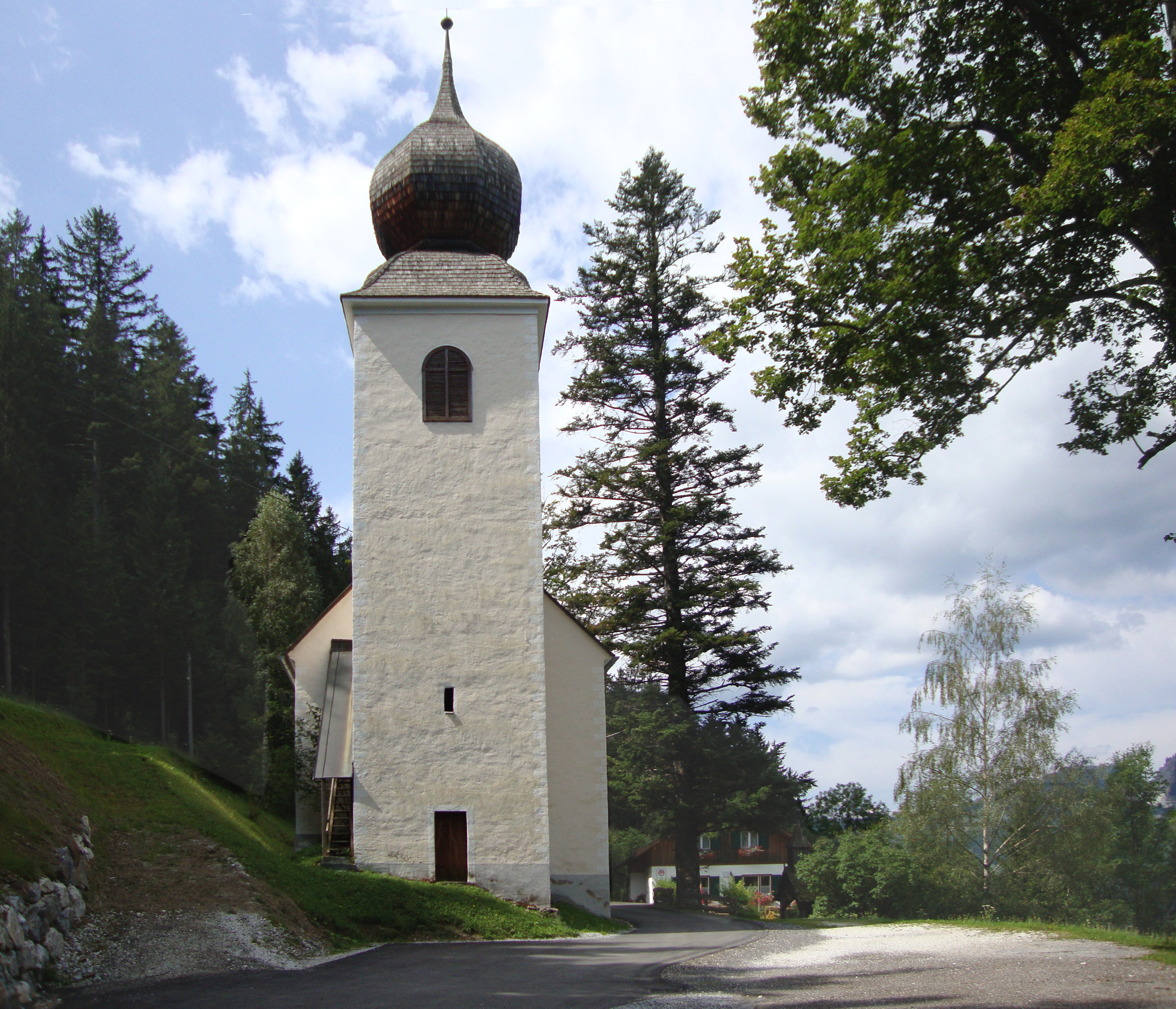
- Gallmannsegg catholic church

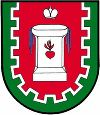
- Coat of arms

- Location within Austria
- Coordinates: 47°09′26″N 15°05′47″E
- Country: Austria
- State: Styria
- District: Voitsberg

Area
  - Total: 32.87 km^{2} (12.69 sq mi)

Population (1 January 2016)
  - Total: 305
  - Density: 9.28/km^{2} (24.0/sq mi)
- Time zone: UTC+1 (CET)
  - Summer (DST): UTC+2 (CEST)
- Postal code: 8573
- Area code: 03148
- Vehicle registration: VO

Gallmannsegg is a former municipality in the district of Voitsberg in the Austrian state of Styria. Since the 2015 Styria municipal structural reform, it is part of the municipality Kainach bei Voitsberg.

== Geography ==
Gallmannsegg lies about 30 km northwest of Graz and southeast of the Speikkogel. The river Kainach has its source in the municipality.
