= Salla, Styria =

Salla
- Former municipality
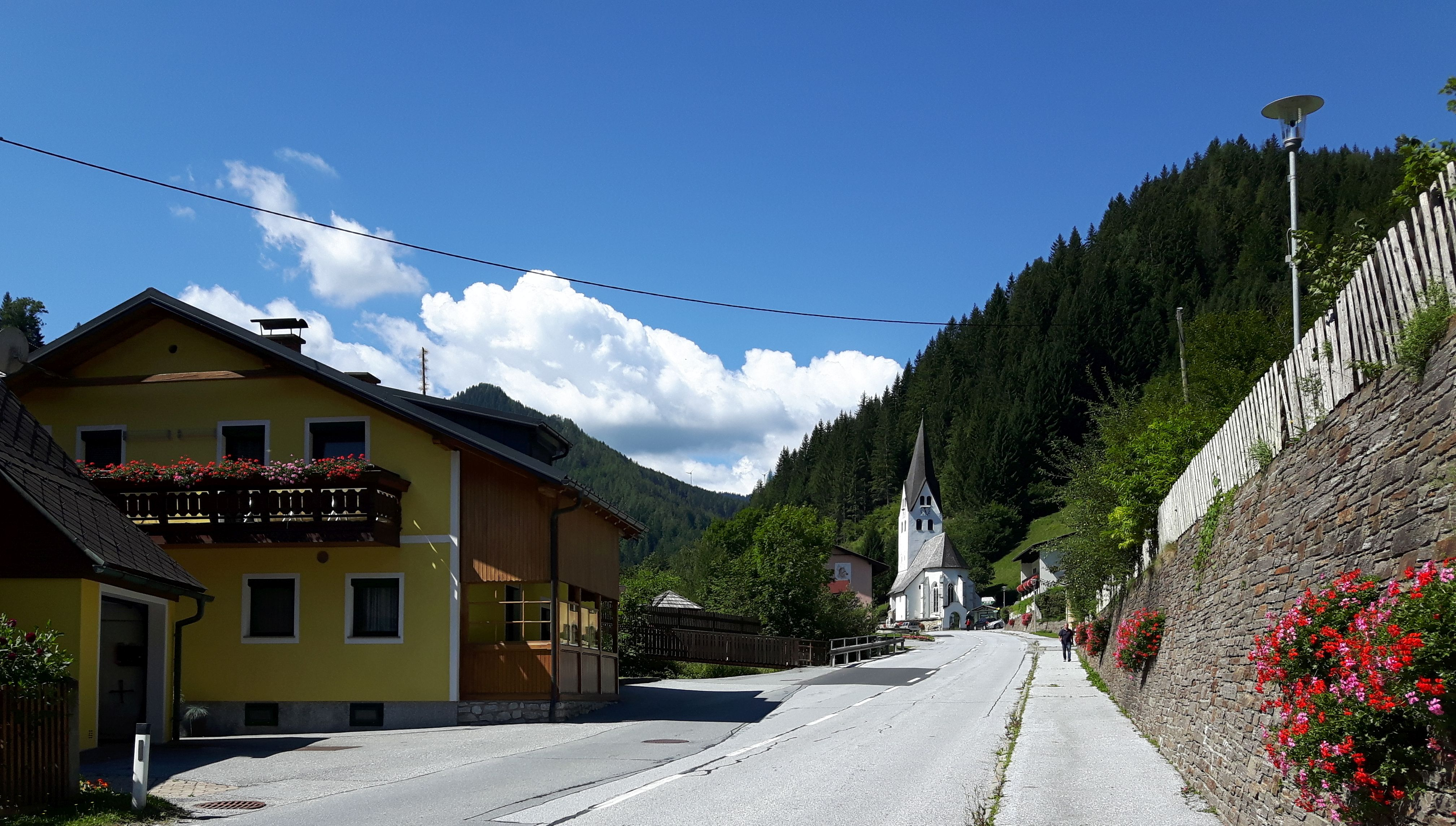
- Street in Salla

- Coat of arms

- Location within Austria
- Coordinates: 47°06′30″N 14°58′23″E
- Country: Austria
- State: Styria
- District: Voitsberg

Area
  - Total: 49.42 km^{2} (19.08 sq mi)

Population (1 January 2016)
  - Total: 283
  - Density: 5.73/km^{2} (14.8/sq mi)
- Time zone: UTC+1 (CET)
  - Summer (DST): UTC+2 (CEST)
- Postal code: 8592
- Area code: 03147
- Vehicle registration: VO
- Website: www.salla.steiermark.at

Salla is a former municipality in the district of Voitsberg in the Austrian state of Styria. Since the 2015 Styria municipal structural reform, it is part of the municipality Maria Lankowitz.

== Population ==
Salla lies west of Graz on the highway between Köflach and Gaberl.
