= Bärnbach =

- Municipality
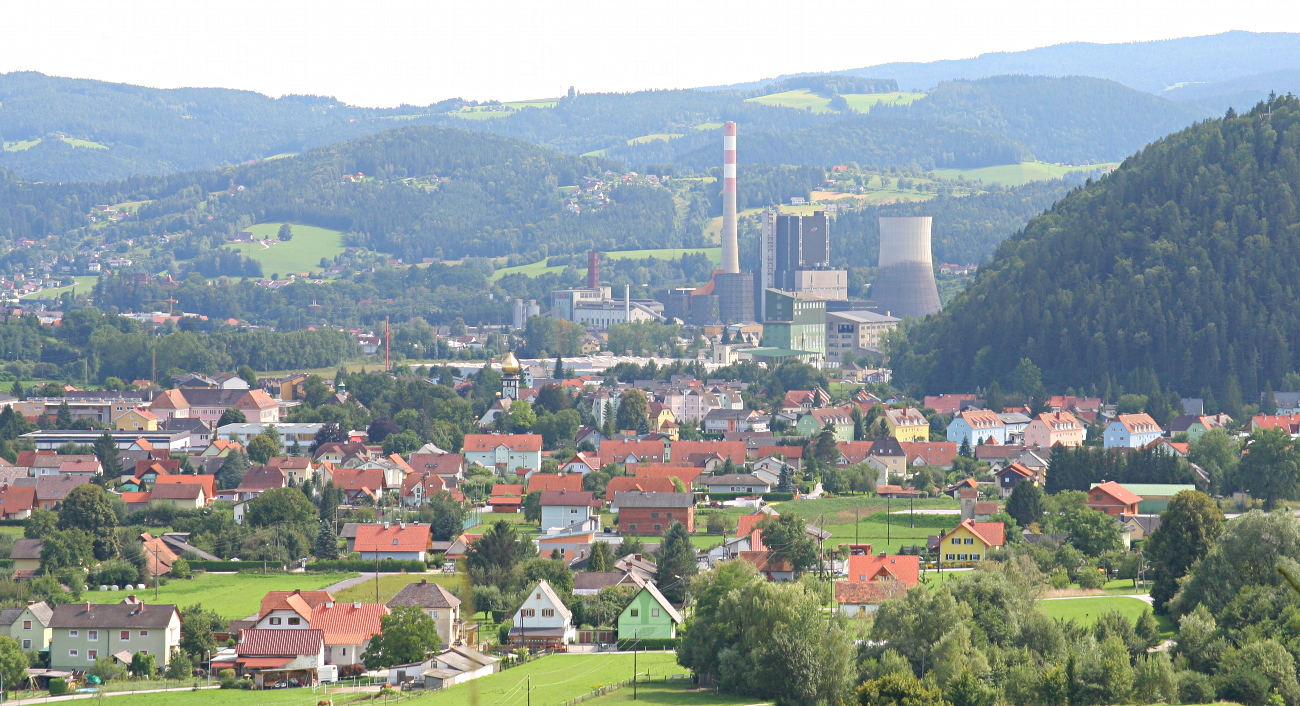

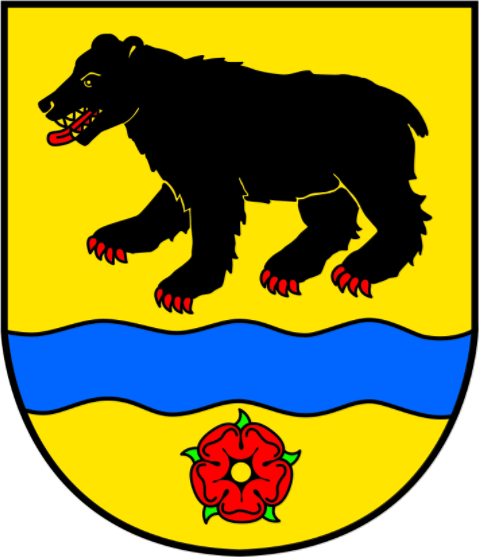
- Coat of arms

- Location within Austria
- Coordinates: 47°04′14″N 15°07′29″E
- Country: Austria
- State: Styria
- District: Voitsberg

Government
  - Mayor: Bernd Osprian (SPÖ)

Area
  - Total: 31.52 km^{2} (12.17 sq mi)
- Elevation: 424 m (1,391 ft)

Population (2018-01-01)
  - Total: 5,642
  - Density: 179.0/km^{2} (463.6/sq mi)
- Time zone: UTC+1 (CET)
  - Summer (DST): UTC+2 (CEST)
- Postal code: 8572
- Area code: 03142
- Vehicle registration: VO
- Website: www.baernbach.at

Bärnbach is the smallest city of the district of Voitsberg in the Austrian state of Styria. The city is popular for its church (designed by Friedensreich Hundertwasser), manual glass manufacturing and coal mining (surface mining). Today the coal mine is closed, because it is uneconomical.

== Population ==
Historical population
Year	Pop.	±%
1869	1,590	—
1880	1,868	+17.5%
1890	2,141	+14.6%
1900	2,343	+9.4%
1910	2,356	+0.6%
1923	3,581	+52.0%
1934	3,814	+6.5%
1939	3,801	−0.3%
1951	5,114	+34.5%
1961	5,648	+10.4%
1971	5,763	+2.0%
1981	5,402	−6.3%
1991	5,160	−4.5%
2001	4,917	−4.7%
2011	5,263	+7.0%

== Culture and Sightseeings ==
Magnet of tourism is the Church of Saint Barbara (patron of miners) which was built in 1948 and was renovated by Friedensreich Hundertwasser in 1987.

There is museum of history and technique of glass manufacturing in the "Stölzle Oberglas" company and a museum of castles in the castle "Altkainach".

== Infrastructure ==
Bärnbach has a railway station on the Köflach railway line, which runs between Graz Hauptbahnhof and Köflach. The Styria S-Bahn stops at the station. The principal road through Bärnbach is the B70 ("Packer Straße"), a Landesstraße. The B70 connects with the Süd Autobahn at Packsattel and Mooskirchen.

== Economy ==
Because of the infrastructural situation industry is not very interested in Bärnbach. Exhaust manufacturer Remus have had their headquarters in the city since 1990.

In former times the important industrial locations were the coal mines, the steam-powerplant "Voitsberg III" and the glassworks. The powerplant was closed in 2006 and the deconstruction began 2013. Today the glassworks closed the industrial production section, but the glassblowing and glass art section are still existing.

Most of the people work in neighbouring cities or in Graz.

Bärnbach also has a mall, called WEZ (Weststeirisches Einkaufszentrum = Weststyrian Shopping centre) which is the biggest mall in the district.

== See also ==
- Tregist village chapel
