= Kohlschwarz =

- Former municipality
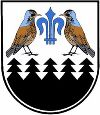
- Coat of arms

- Location within Austria
- Coordinates: 47°06′31″N 15°07′13″E
- Country: Austria
- State: Styria
- District: Voitsberg

Area
  - Total: 15.95 km^{2} (6.16 sq mi)
- Elevation: 700 m (2,300 ft)

Population (1 January 2016)
  - Total: 702
  - Density: 44.0/km^{2} (114/sq mi)
- Time zone: UTC+1 (CET)
  - Summer (DST): UTC+2 (CEST)
- Postal code: 8573
- Area code: 03148
- Vehicle registration: VO
- Website: www.kohlschwarz.at

Kohlschwarz is a former municipality in the district of Voitsberg in the Austrian state of Styria. Since the 2015 Styria municipal structural reform, it is part of the municipality Kainach bei Voitsberg.

== Geography ==
Kohlschwarz lies west of Graz.
