= Martin Krienzer =

Austrian footballer (born 2000)

Personal information
- Date of birth: 12 February 2000 (age 26)
- Place of birth: Stallhofen, Austria
- Height: 1.80 m (5 ft 11 in)
- Position: Forward

Team information
- Current team: ASK Voitsberg
- Number: 15

Youth career
- 2008–2010: FC Stattegg
- 2010–2016: Sturm Graz

Senior career*
Years	Team	Apps	(Gls)
2016–2022	Sturm Graz II	98	(59)
2020–2022	Sturm Graz	1	(0)
2020–2021	→ Lafnitz (loan)	27	(6)
2022–2023	Admira Wacker	25	(3)
2024–	ASK Voitsberg	62	(19)

International career^{‡}
2015	Austria U15	2	(0)
2015–2016	Austria U16	7	(5)
2016–2017	Austria U17	9	(4)
2017–2018	Austria U18	10	(1)
2018	Austria U19	6	(0)
- * Club domestic league appearances and goals as of 27 June 2026 ‡ National team caps and goals as of 21:10, 10 June 2022 (UTC)

Martin Krienzer (born 12 February 2000) is an Austrian professional footballer who plays as a forward for Admiral 2nd League club ASK Voitsberg.

== Career ==
Born in Stallhofen, Styria, Krienzer is a youth product of FC Stattegg and Sturm Graz, and began his senior career with their reserves in 2016. He made his professional debut with the senior Sturm Graz team in a 4–1 Austrian Football Bundesliga loss to Hartberg on 7 May 2020. On 22 June 2020, he extended his contract with the club until the summer of 2022. He spent the 2020–21 season on loan with Lafnitz in the Austrian 2. Liga.

On 15 June 2022, Krienzer signed a two-year contract with recently relegated 2. Liga club Admira Wacker.

Krienzer joined Austrian Regionalliga Central club ASK Voitsberg on 12 January 2024.

== International career ==
Krienzer is a youth international for Austria, having represented them from the U15s to the U19s.
