= Hirschegg =

- Former municipality
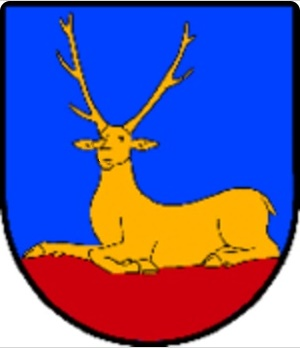
- Coat of arms

- Location within Austria
- Coordinates: 47°01′12″N 14°57′30″E
- Country: Austria
- State: Styria
- District: Voitsberg

Area
  - Total: 59.83 km^{2} (23.10 sq mi)
- Elevation: 899 m (2,949 ft)

Population (2014-01-01)
  - Total: 653
  - Density: 10.9/km^{2} (28.3/sq mi)
- Time zone: UTC+1 (CET)
  - Summer (DST): UTC+2 (CEST)
- Postal code: 8584
- Area code: 03141
- Vehicle registration: VO
- Website: www.hirschegg.at

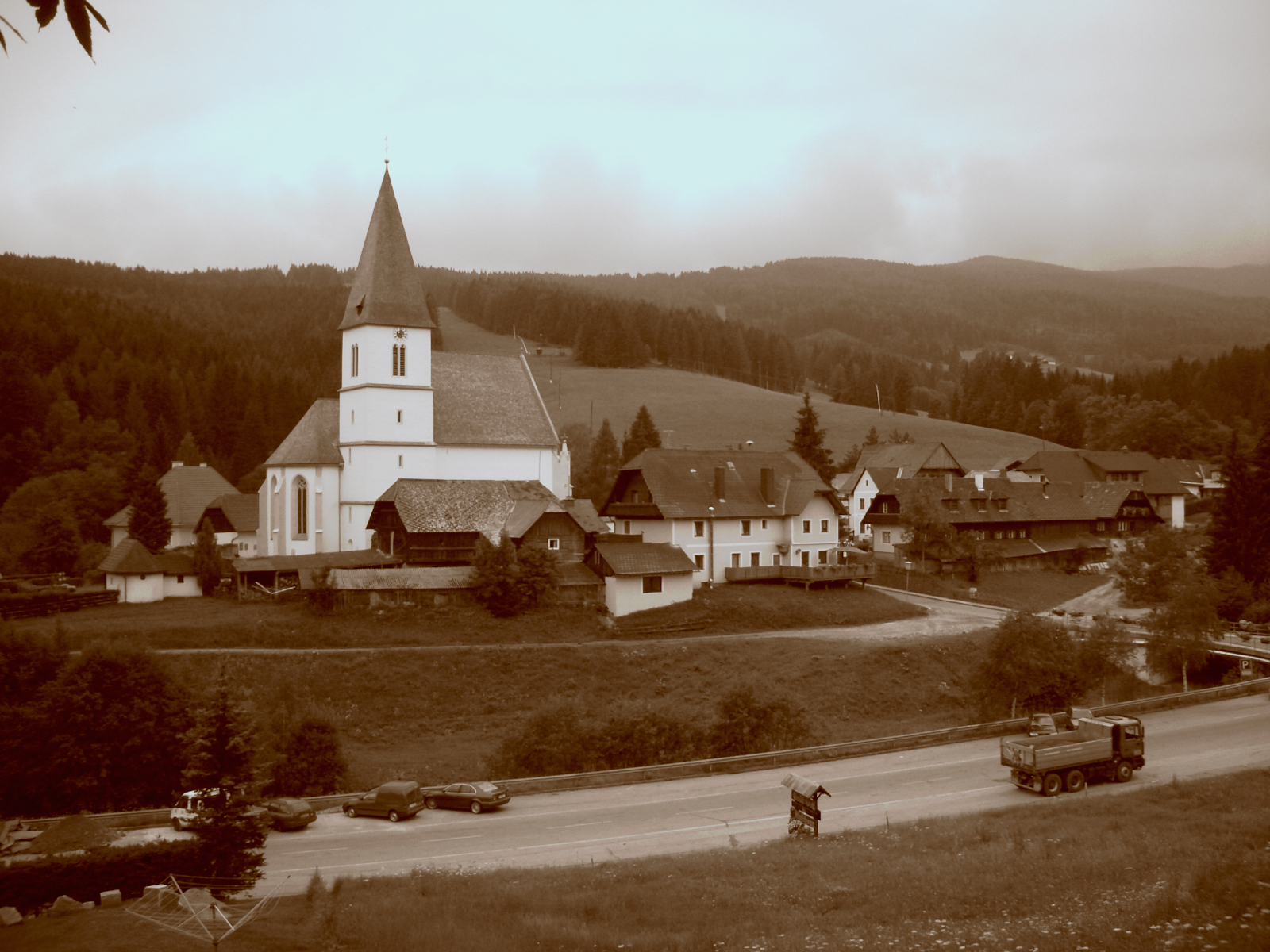
Hirschegg, 2006.

Hirschegg was a municipality in Austria, merged in 2015 into Hirschegg-Pack, in the district of Voitsberg in the Austrian state of Styria, in south central Austria.

== Geography ==
Hirschegg is an alpine village that lies about 14 km (8.7 mi) west of Voitsberg. It is on the border between Styria and Carinthia.
