= Voitsberg District =

Coordinates: 47.050°N 15.114°E

Voitsberg District Bezirk Voitsberg
- District
- Country: Austria
- State: Styria
- Number of municipalities: 15
- Administrative seat: Voitsberg

Government
  - District Governor: Hannes Peißl

Area
  - Total: 678.60 km^{2} (262.01 sq mi)

Population (2001)
  - Total: 53,588
  - Density: 78.968/km^{2} (204.53/sq mi)
- Time zone: UTC+01:00 (CET)
  - Summer (DST): UTC+02:00 (CEST)
- Telephone prefix: (0)3142 (City)
- Vehicle registration: VO
- NUTS code: AT225

Bezirk Voitsberg (German: [ˈfɔɪ̯t͡sbɛʁk]) is a district of the state of Styria in Austria.

== Municipalities ==
Since the 2015 Styria municipal structural reform, it consists of the following municipalities:

- Bärnbach
- Edelschrott
- Geistthal-Södingberg
- Hirschegg-Pack
- Kainach bei Voitsberg
- Köflach
- Krottendorf-Gaisfeld
- Ligist
- Maria Lankowitz
- Mooskirchen
- Rosental an der Kainach
- Sankt Martin am Wöllmißberg
- Söding-Sankt Johann
- Stallhofen
- Voitsberg

== Municipalities before 2015 ==
Suburbs, hamlets and other subdivisions of a municipality are indicated in small characters.

- Bärnbach
  - Hochtregist
- Edelschrott
  - Kreuzberg
- Gallmannsegg
  - Hadergasse
- Geistthal
  - Eggartsberg, Kleinalpe, Sonnleiten
- Gößnitz
  - Hochgößnitz, Niedergößnitz
- Graden
- Hirschegg
  - Hirschegg-Piber-Sonnseite, Hirschegg-Piber-Winkel, Hirschegg-Rein
- Kainach bei Voitsberg
  - Breitenbach, Oswaldgraben
- Köflach
  - Gradenberg, Piber, Pichling bei Köflach, Puchbach
- Kohlschwarz
  - Hemmerberg
- Krottendorf-Gaisfeld
  - Gasselberg, Gaisfeld, Kleingaisfeld, Krottendorf bei Ligist, Muggauberg
- Ligist
  - Dietenberg, Grabenwarth, Ligistberg, Ligist Markt, Oberwald, Steinberg, Unterwald
- Maria Lankowitz
  - Kemetberg, Kirchberg
- Modriach
- Mooskirchen
  - Bubendorf, Fluttendorf, Gießenberg, Kniezenberg, Neudorf bei Mooskirchen, Rauchegg, Rubmannsberg, Stögersdorf
- Pack
- Piberegg
  - Piberegg Rollsiedlung
- Rosental an der Kainach
- Salla
- Sankt Johann-Köppling
  - Hallersdorf, Hausdorf, Köppling, Moosing, Muggauberg, Neudorf bei Sankt Johann ob Hohenburg, Sankt Johann ob Hohenburg
- Sankt Martin am Wöllmißberg
  - Großwöllmiß, Kleinwöllmiß
- Söding
  - Großsöding, Kleinsöding, Pichling bei Mooskirchen
- Södingberg
- Stallhofen
  - Aichegg, Bernau in der Steiermark, Hausdorf, Kalchberg, Muggauberg, Raßberg
- Voitsberg
