= Modriach =

- Former municipality
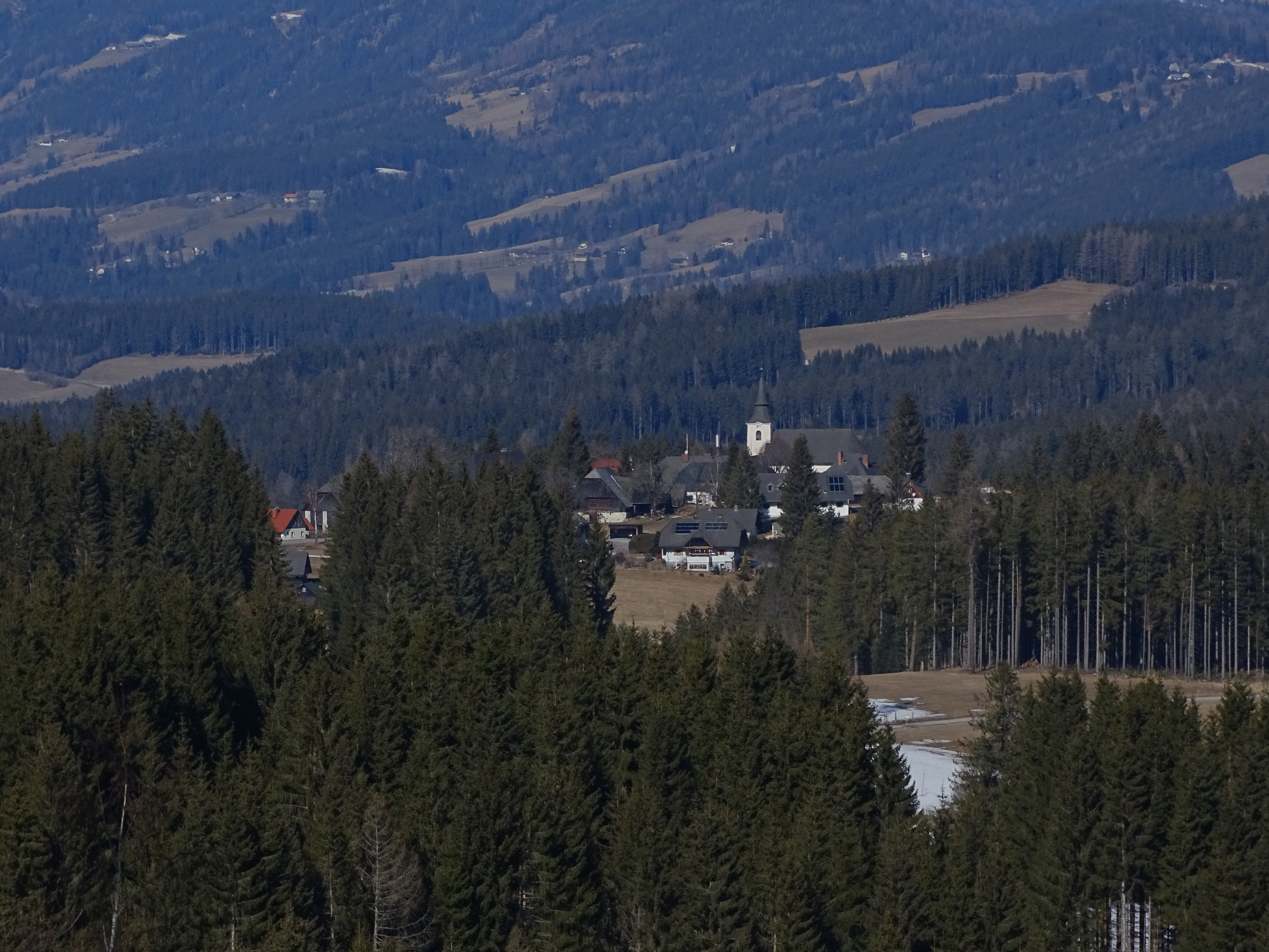
- Remote view of Modriach

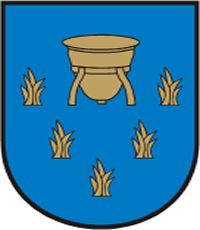
- Coat of arms

- Location within Austria
- Coordinates: 46°57′28″N 15°03′36″E
- Country: Austria
- State: Styria
- District: Voitsberg

Area
  - Total: 22.02 km^{2} (8.50 sq mi)

Population (1 January 2016)
  - Total: 204
  - Density: 9.26/km^{2} (24.0/sq mi)
- Time zone: UTC+1 (CET)
  - Summer (DST): UTC+2 (CEST)
- Postal code: 8583
- Area code: 03146
- Vehicle registration: VO

Modriach is a former municipality in the district of Voitsberg in the Austrian state of Styria. Since the 2015 Styria municipal structural reform, it is part of the municipality Edelschrott.

== Geography ==
Modriach lies southwest of Graz north of the Koralp mountain.
