= Rosental an der Kainach =

- Municipality
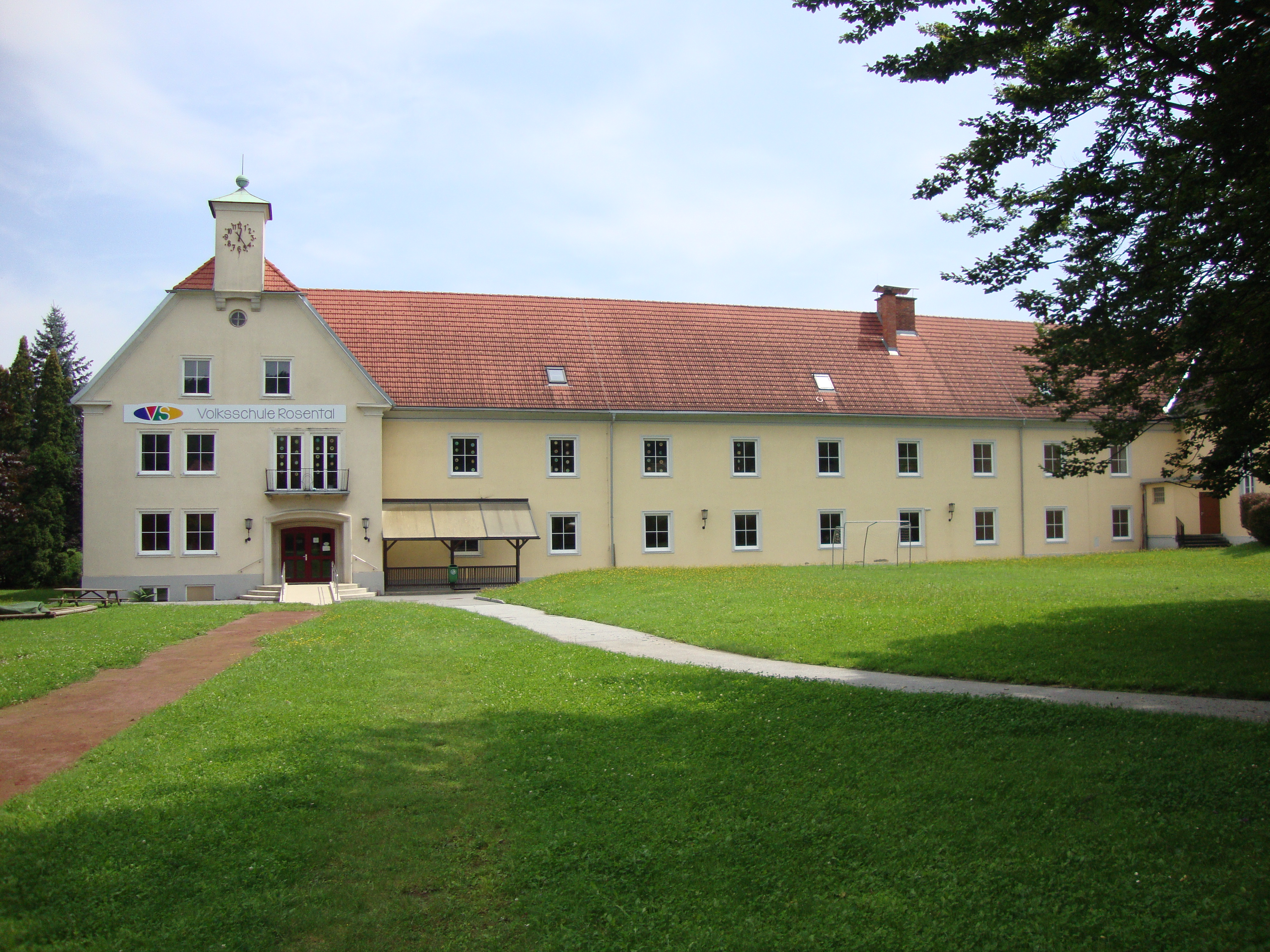
- School in Rosental

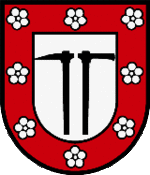
- Coat of arms

- Location within Austria
- Coordinates: 47°03′06″N 15°06′51″E
- Country: Austria
- State: Styria
- District: Voitsberg

Government
  - Mayor: Johannes Schmid (SPÖ)

Area
  - Total: 6.52 km^{2} (2.52 sq mi)

Population (2018-01-01)
  - Total: 1,678
  - Density: 257/km^{2} (667/sq mi)
- Time zone: UTC+1 (CET)
  - Summer (DST): UTC+2 (CEST)
- Postal code: 8582
- Area code: 03142
- Vehicle registration: VO
- Website: www.rosental-kainach.at

Rosental an der Kainach is a municipality in the district of Voitsberg in the Austrian state of Styria.

== Economy ==
Rosental was once a brown coal mining town.
