= Sankt Martin am Wöllmißberg =

- Municipality
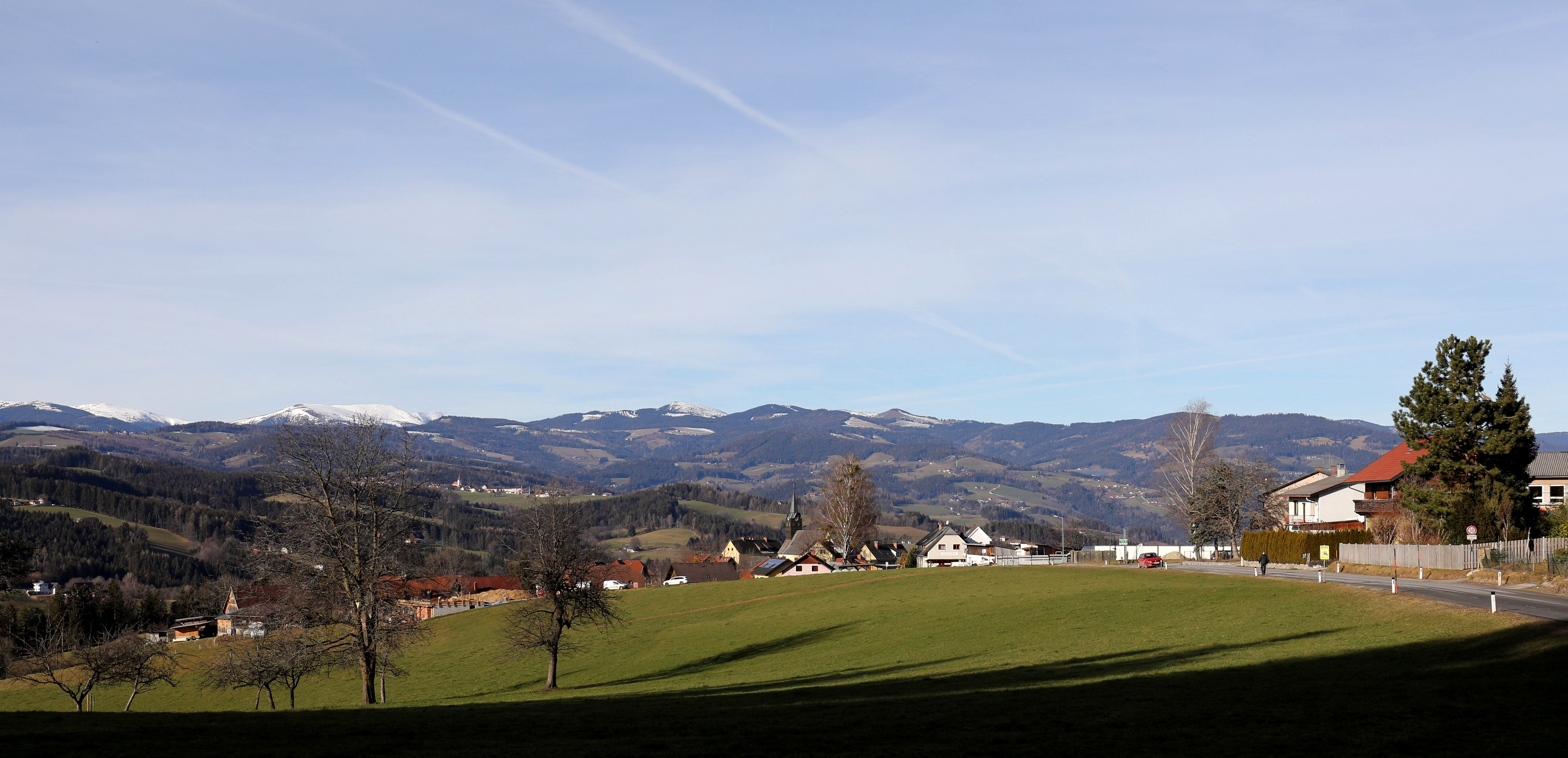
- Sankt Martin am Wöllmißberg

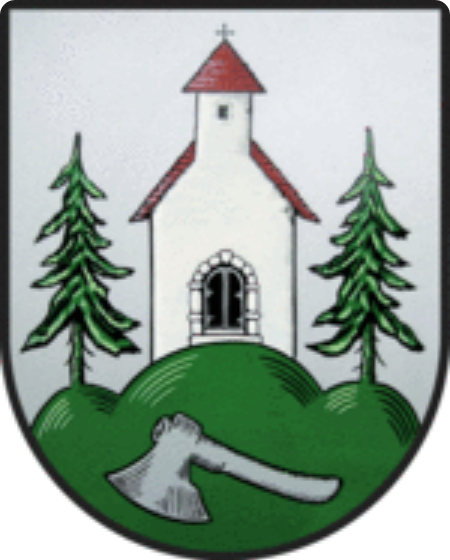
- Coat of arms

- Location within Austria
- Coordinates: 47°00′00″N 15°06′00″E
- Country: Austria
- State: Styria
- District: Voitsberg

Government
  - Mayor: Johann Hansbauer (ÖVP)

Area
  - Total: 25.59 km^{2} (9.88 sq mi)
- Elevation: 704 m (2,310 ft)

Population (2018-01-01)
  - Total: 790
  - Density: 31/km^{2} (80/sq mi)
- Time zone: UTC+1 (CET)
  - Summer (DST): UTC+2 (CEST)
- Postal code: 8580
- Area code: 03140
- Vehicle registration: VO
- Website: www.st-martin-woellmissberg.at.hm

Sankt Martin am Wöllmißberg is a municipality in the district of Voitsberg in the Austrian state of Styria.

== Geography ==
The municipality lies south of Köflach and Voitsberg.
