= Pack Saddle =

Alpine pass in Austria (Styria)

Pack Saddle Packsattel
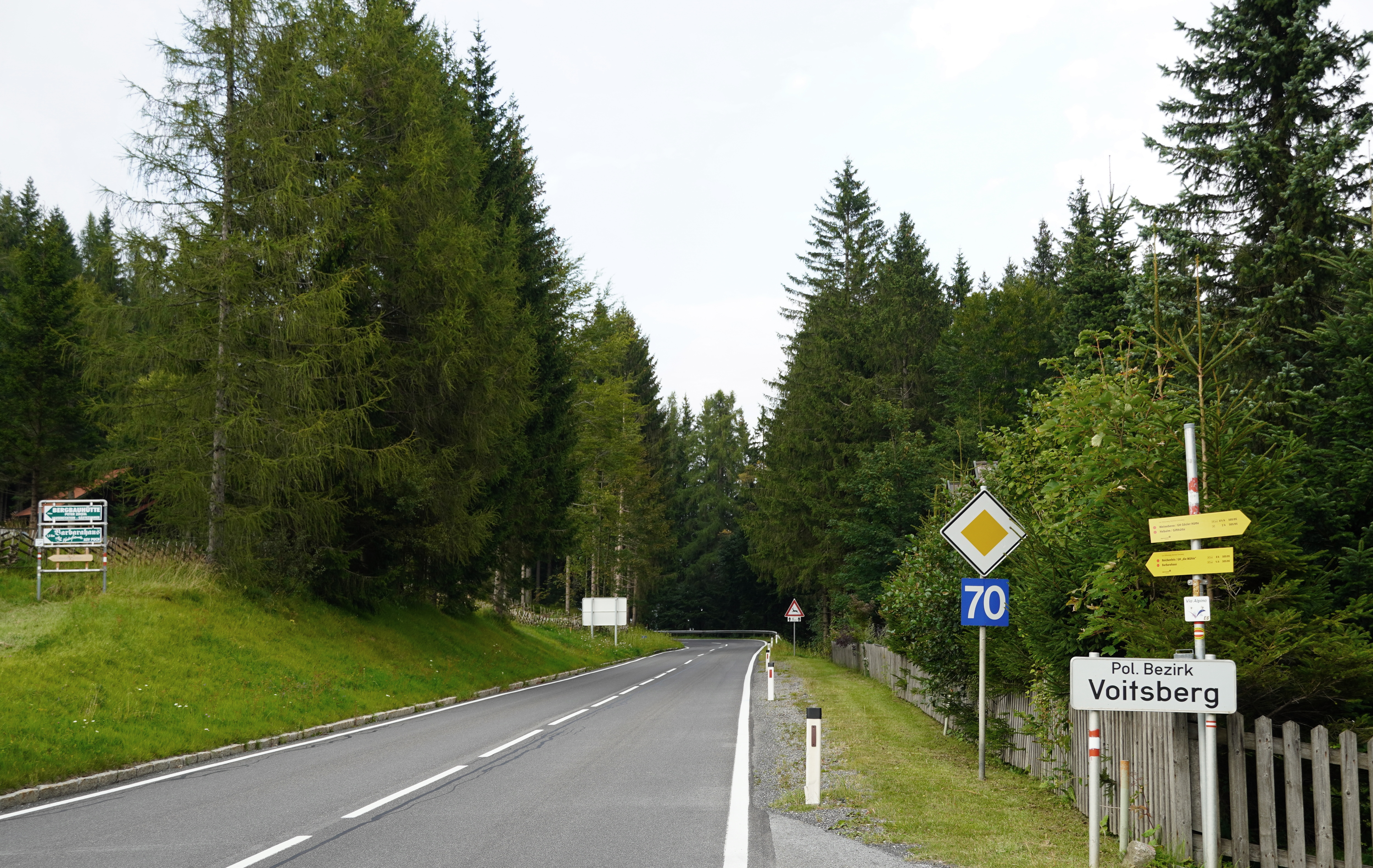
- Summit

- Location within Alps
- Elevation: 1,169 metres (3,835 ft)

Third Approach
- Location: Austria
- Range: Alps
- Coordinates: 46°57′N 14°58′E

The Pack Saddle (German: Packsattel, 1,169 metres [3,835 ft]) is a high mountain pass in the Austrian Alps between the Lavant River valley in Carinthia and the Bundesland of Styria. It connects Pack & Preitenegg.

== See also ==
- List of highest paved roads in Europe
- List of mountain passes
