= Graden =

- Former municipality
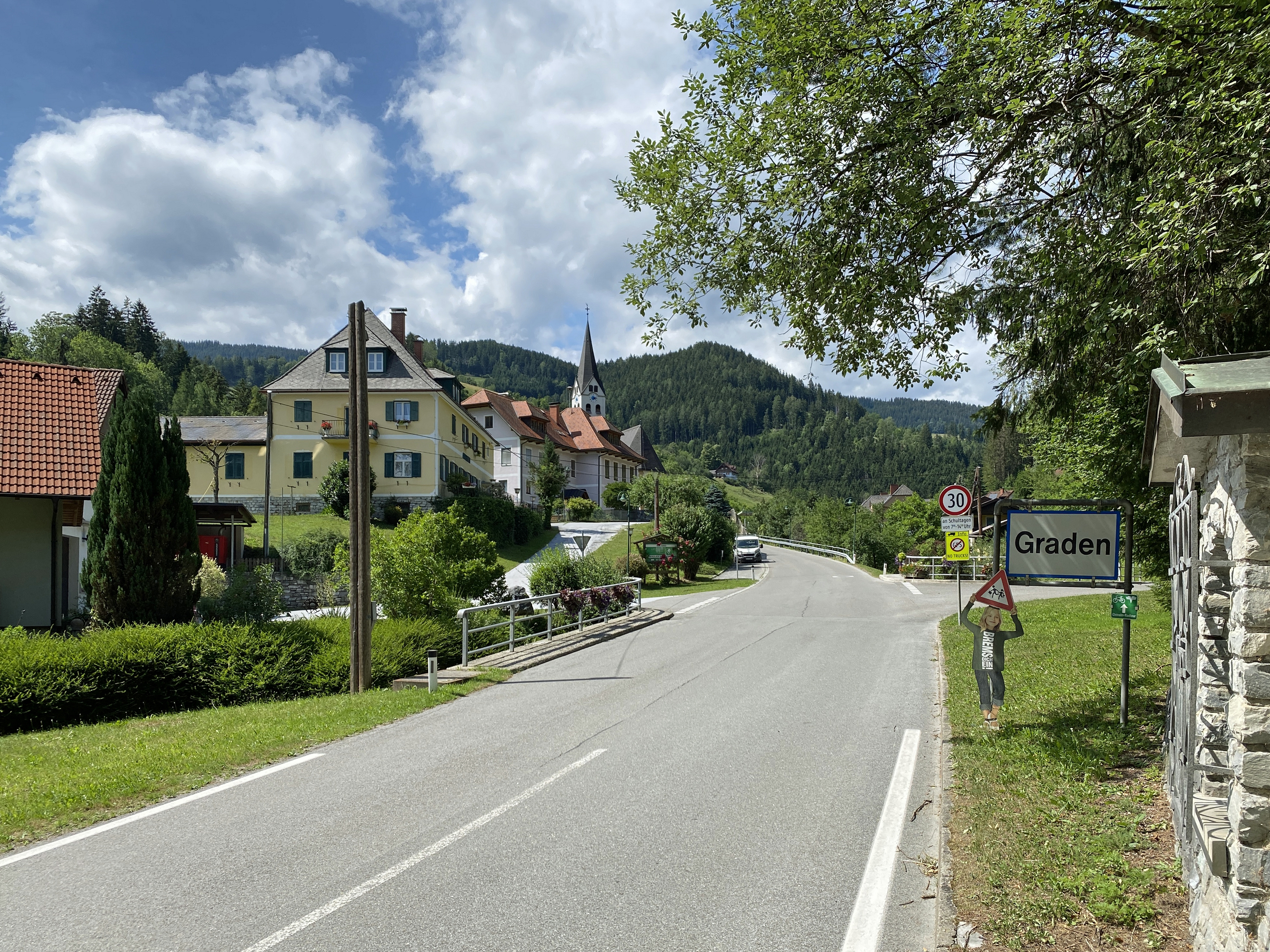
- Entrance to Graden

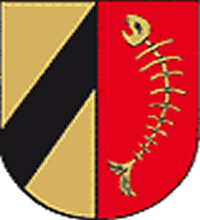
- Coat of arms

- Location within Austria
- Coordinates: 47°07′50″N 15°02′07″E
- Country: Austria
- State: Styria
- District: Voitsberg

Area
  - Total: 22.86 km^{2} (8.83 sq mi)
- Elevation: 697 m (2,287 ft)

Population (1 January 2016)
  - Total: 475
  - Density: 20.8/km^{2} (53.8/sq mi)
- Time zone: UTC+1 (CET)
  - Summer (DST): UTC+2 (CEST)
- Postal code: 8593
- Area code: +43 3144
- Vehicle registration: VO
- Website: www.graden.at

Graden is a former municipality in the district of Voitsberg in the Austrian state of Styria. Since the 2015 Styria municipal structural reform, it is part of the municipality Köflach.

== Geography ==
Graden lies west of Graz.
