= Pack, Styria =

Pack
- Former municipality
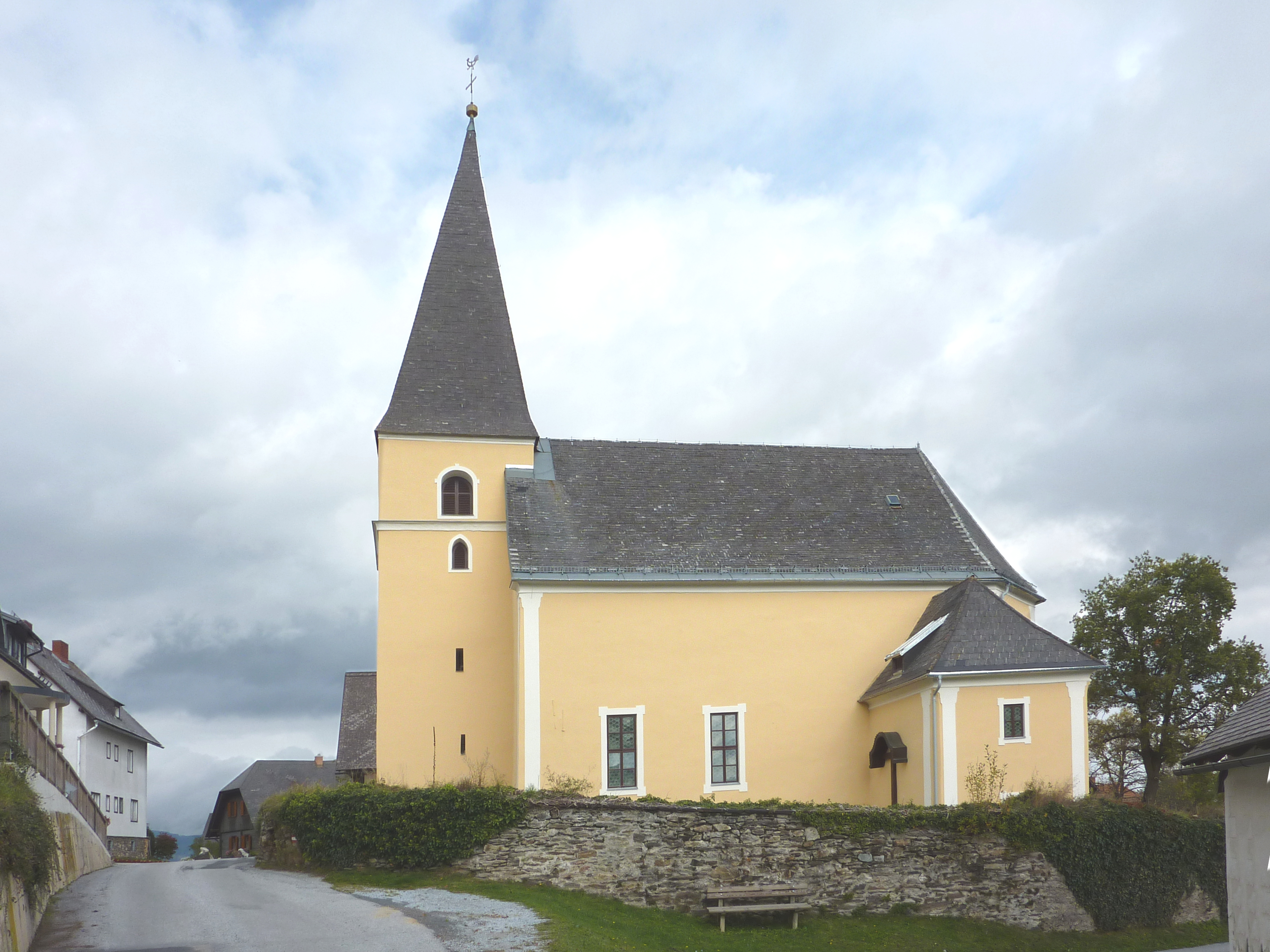
- Pack parish church

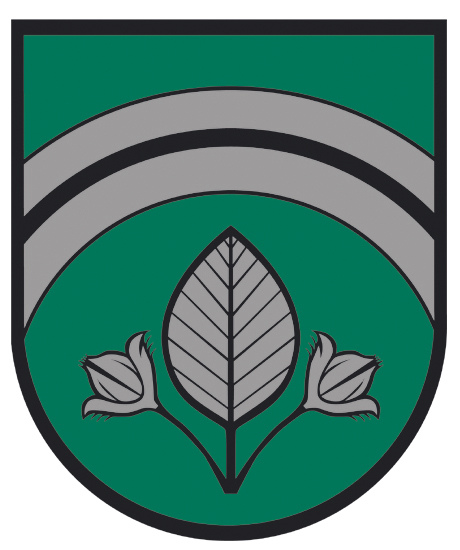
- Coat of arms

- Location within Austria
- Coordinates: 46°58′40″N 14°59′05″E
- Country: Austria
- State: Styria
- District: Voitsberg

Area
  - Total: 39.06 km^{2} (15.08 sq mi)
- Elevation: 1.116 m (3.66 ft)

Population (1 January 2016)
  - Total: 414
  - Density: 10.6/km^{2} (27.5/sq mi)
- Time zone: UTC+1 (CET)
  - Summer (DST): UTC+2 (CEST)
- Postal code: 8583
- Area code: 03146
- Vehicle registration: VO
- Website: www.pack.steiermark.at

Pack is a former municipality in the district of Voitsberg in the Austrian state of Styria. Since the 2015 Styria municipal structural reform, it is part of the municipality Hirschegg-Pack.

== Geography ==
Pack lies west of Graz near Pack Pass on the border between Styria and Carinthia.
