= Ligist =

- Municipality
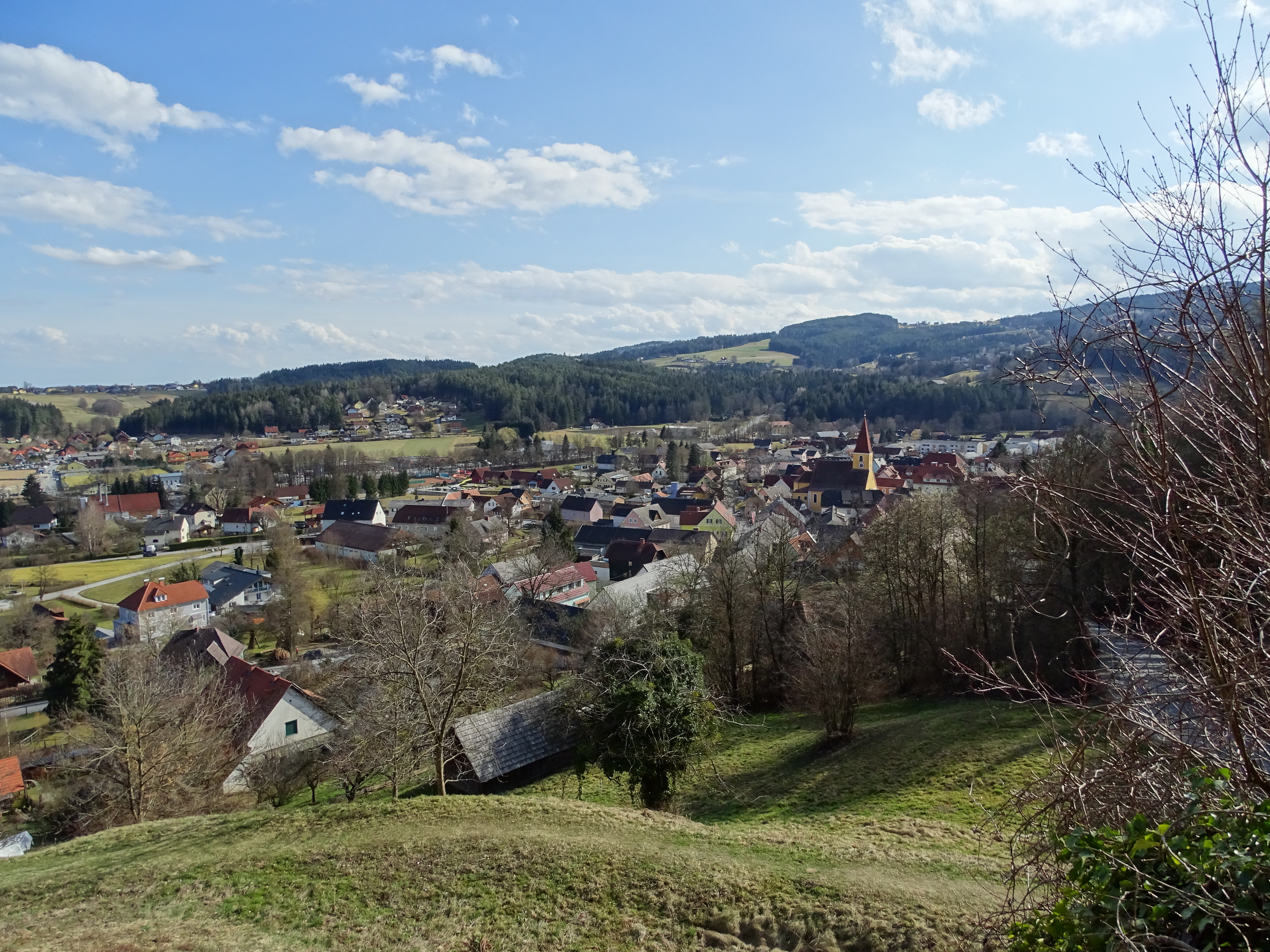

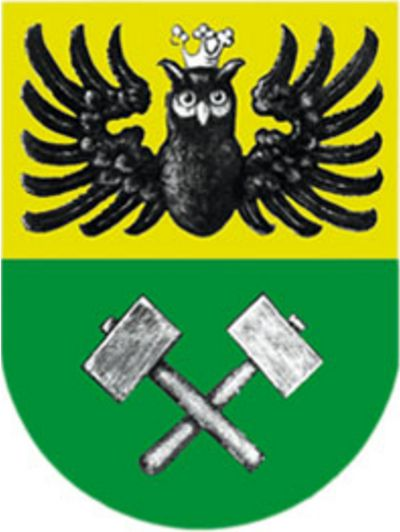
- Coat of arms

- Location within Austria
- Coordinates: 46°59′38″N 15°12′38″E
- Country: Austria
- State: Styria
- District: Voitsberg

Government
  - Mayor: Wolfgang Mauser (SPÖ)

Area
  - Total: 34.62 km^{2} (13.37 sq mi)
- Elevation: 392 m (1,286 ft)

Population (2018-01-01)
  - Total: 3,275
  - Density: 94.60/km^{2} (245.0/sq mi)
- Time zone: UTC+1 (CET)
  - Summer (DST): UTC+2 (CEST)
- Postal code: 8563
- Area code: 03143
- Vehicle registration: VO
- Website: www.ligist.at

Ligist is a municipality in the district of Voitsberg in the Austrian state of Styria.

== Geography ==
Ligist lies in the west Styrian foothills.
