= Mooskirchen =

- Municipality
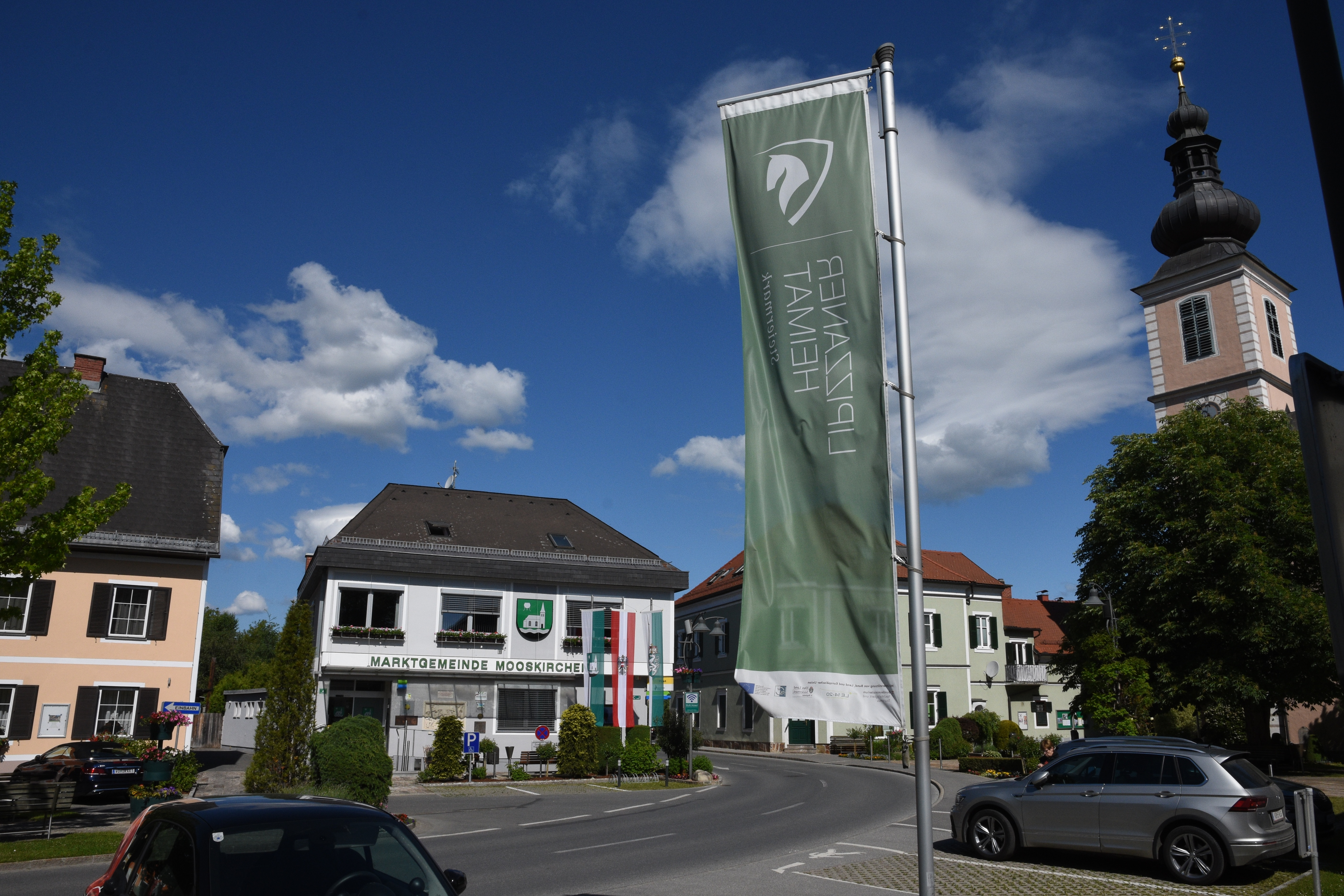
- Centre of Mooskirchen

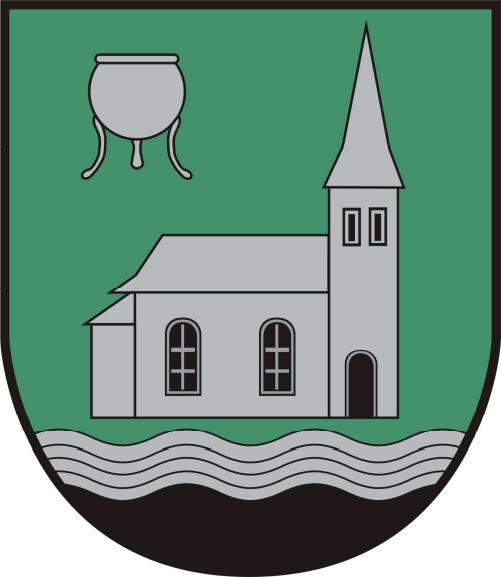
- Coat of arms

- Location within Austria
- Coordinates: 46°59′03″N 15°16′56″E
- Country: Austria
- State: Styria
- District: Voitsberg

Government
  - Mayor: Peter Fließer (ÖVP)

Area
  - Total: 17.97 km^{2} (6.94 sq mi)
- Elevation: 520 m (1,710 ft)

Population (2018-01-01)
  - Total: 2,207
  - Density: 122.8/km^{2} (318.1/sq mi)
- Time zone: UTC+1 (CET)
  - Summer (DST): UTC+2 (CEST)
- Postal code: 8562
- Area code: 03137
- Vehicle registration: VO
- Website: www.mooskirchen.at

Mooskirchen is a municipality in the district of Voitsberg in the Austrian state of Styria.

== Geography ==
Mooskirchen liest southwest of Graz.
