= Stallhofen =

- Municipality
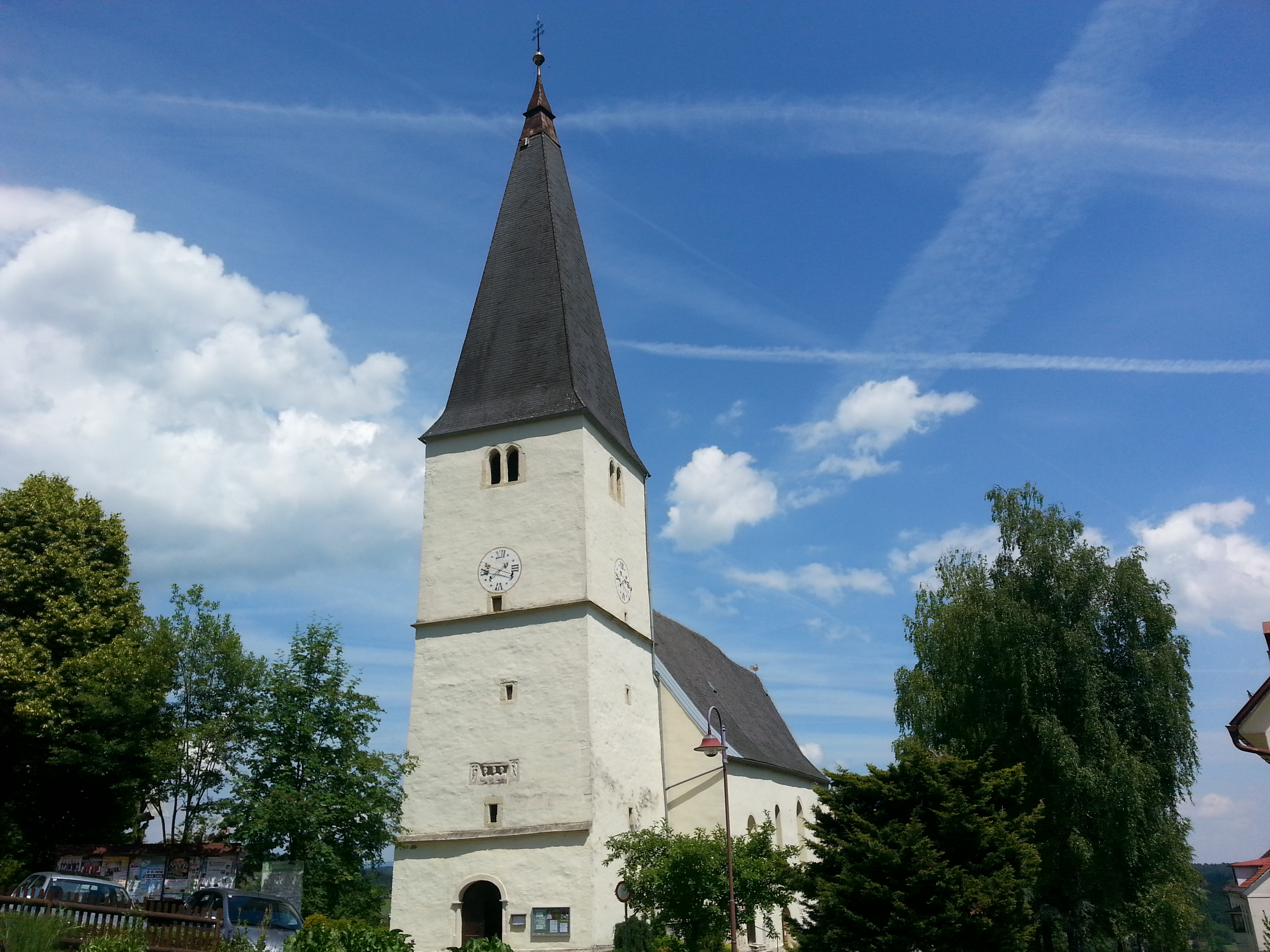
- Stallhofen parish church

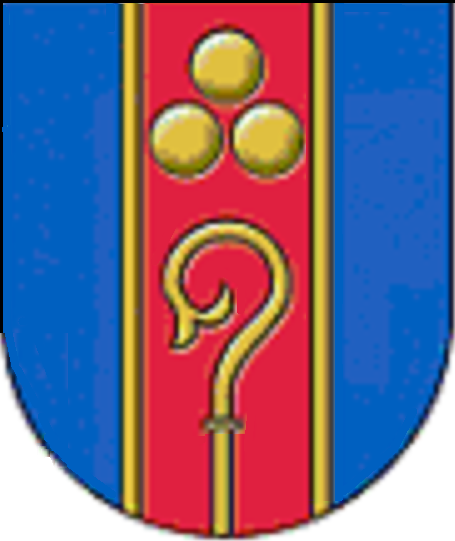
- Coat of arms

- Location within Austria
- Coordinates: 47°03′00″N 15°13′00″E
- Country: Austria
- State: Styria
- District: Voitsberg

Government
  - Mayor: Feirer Franz (ÖVP)

Area
  - Total: 27.28 km^{2} (10.53 sq mi)
- Elevation: 444 m (1,457 ft)

Population (2018-01-01)
  - Total: 3,118
  - Density: 114.3/km^{2} (296.0/sq mi)
- Time zone: UTC+1 (CET)
  - Summer (DST): UTC+2 (CEST)
- Postal code: 8152
- Area code: 03142
- Vehicle registration: VO
- Website: www.stallhofen.at

Stallhofen is a municipality in the district of Voitsberg in the Austrian state of Styria.
