= Maria Lankowitz =

- Municipality
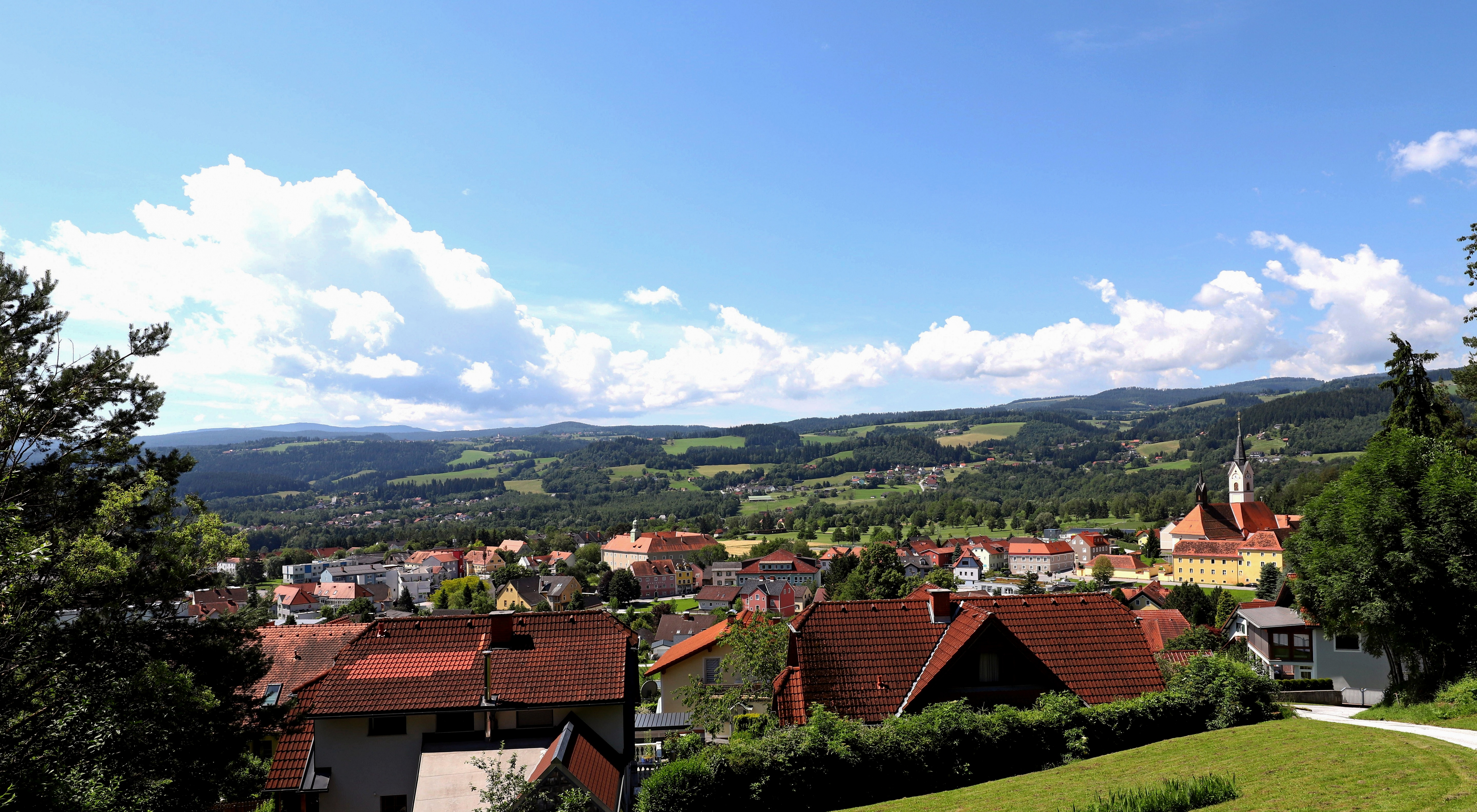
- Street in Maria Lankowitz

- Coat of arms

- Location within Austria
- Coordinates: 47°3′45″N 15°3′45″E
- Country: Austria
- State: Styria
- District: Voitsberg

Government
  - Mayor: Josef Riemer (SPÖ)

Area
  - Total: 104.29 km^{2} (40.27 sq mi)
- Elevation: 515 m (1,690 ft)

Population (2018-01-01)
  - Total: 2,858
  - Density: 27.40/km^{2} (70.98/sq mi)
- Time zone: UTC+1 (CET)
  - Summer (DST): UTC+2 (CEST)
- Postal code: A-8591
- Area code: 6 16 13
- Website: www.maria-lankowitz.at

Maria Lankowitz is a small market township near Köflach in the district of Voitsberg in the Austrian state of Styria, at the foot of the Stubalpe mountain.

== History ==
Maria Lankowitz was first mentioned in records in 1415. The 15th-century church is the most important Styrian place of pilgrimage after Mariazell.

== Economy ==
On the mountain pastures, where the Lipizzaner horses to the Spanish Riding School in Vienna graze in summer, there are ski pistes and cross-country ski runs. The former coal mines have been turned into a lake and a golf course.
