= Edelschrott =

- Municipality
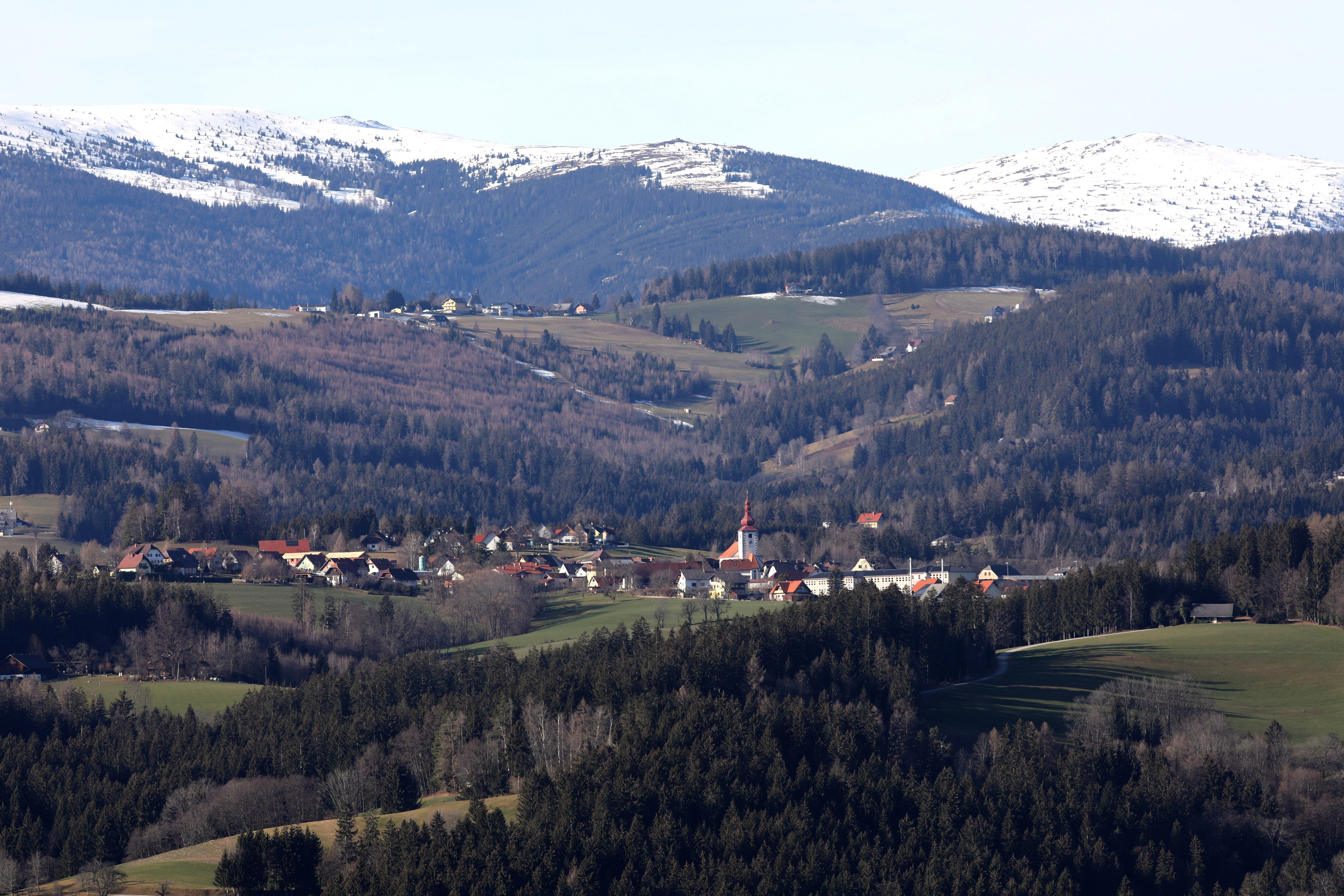

- Coat of arms

- Location within Austria
- Coordinates: 47°01′25″N 15°03′11″E
- Country: Austria
- State: Styria
- District: Voitsberg

Government
  - Mayor: Georg Preßler (ÖVP)

Area
  - Total: 87.8 km^{2} (33.9 sq mi)
- Elevation: 793 m (2,602 ft)

Population (2018-01-01)
  - Total: 1,735
  - Density: 19.8/km^{2} (51.2/sq mi)
- Time zone: UTC+1 (CET)
  - Summer (DST): UTC+2 (CEST)
- Postal code: 8583
- Area code: 03145
- Vehicle registration: VO
- Website: www.edelschrott.at

Edelschrott is a municipality in the district of Voitsberg in the Austrian state of Styria.

== Geography ==
Edelschrott lies halfway between Köflach and the Pack Pass.

== Demographics ==
As of 2024, Edelschrott had a population of 1,632; 96.8% of whom held Austrian citizenship and 96.1% of whom were born in Austria.

The age group under 20 years old accounted for 15.6% of the population, those aged between 20 and 64 made up 56.4%, and individuals aged 65 and over comprised the remaining 28.0%. Women accounted for 48.8% of the population.

61.5% of foreign citizens held citizenship from another EU member state. When looking at individual countries, Germany accounts for the largest share of foreign nationals.

== Politics ==
The municipal council (Gemeinderat) consists of 15 members. Since the 2025 local elections, it is made up of the following parties:

- Austrian People's Party (ÖVP): 13 seats
- Freedom Party of Austria (FPÖ): 1 seat
- Social Democratic Party of Austria (SPÖ): 1 seat
