= Kainach bei Voitsberg =

- Municipality
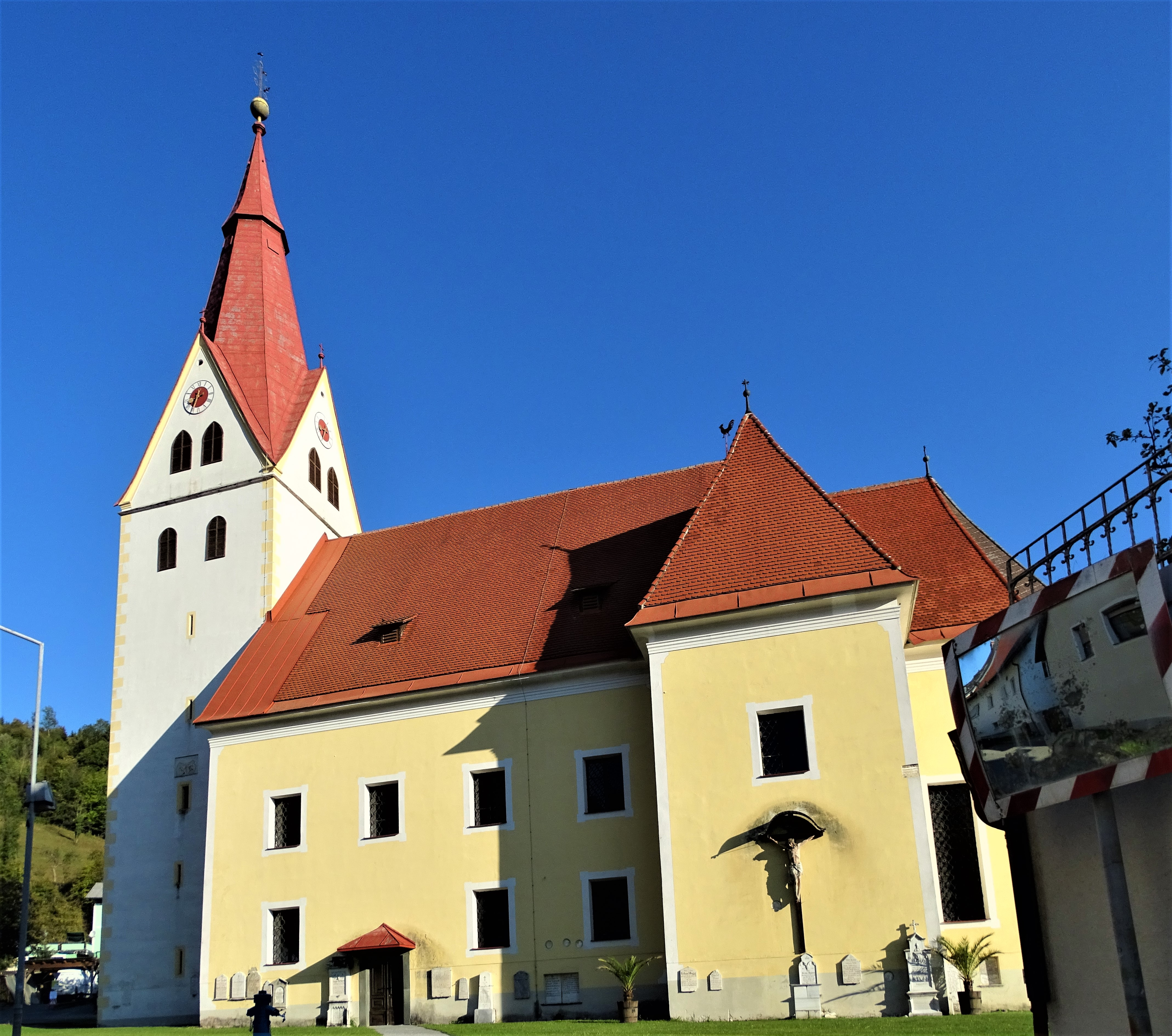
- Kainach parish church

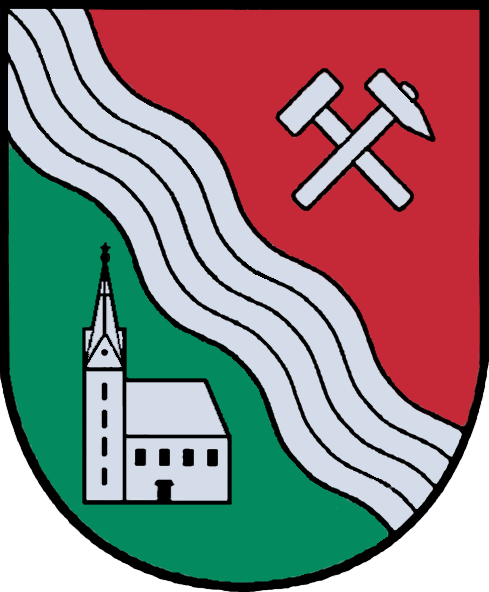
- Coat of arms

- Location within Austria
- Coordinates: 47°08′22″N 15°05′38″E
- Country: Austria
- State: Styria
- District: Voitsberg

Government
  - Mayor: Bernd Gratzer (SPÖ)

Area
  - Total: 83.25 km^{2} (32.14 sq mi)

Population (2018-01-01)
  - Total: 1,628
  - Density: 19.56/km^{2} (50.65/sq mi)
- Time zone: UTC+1 (CET)
  - Summer (DST): UTC+2 (CEST)
- Postal code: 8573
- Area code: 03148
- Vehicle registration: VO
- Website: www.kainach.at

Kainach bei Voitsberg is a municipality in the district of Voitsberg in the Austrian state of Styria.

== Geography ==
Kainach lies west of Graz.
