= Voitsberg =

- Municipality
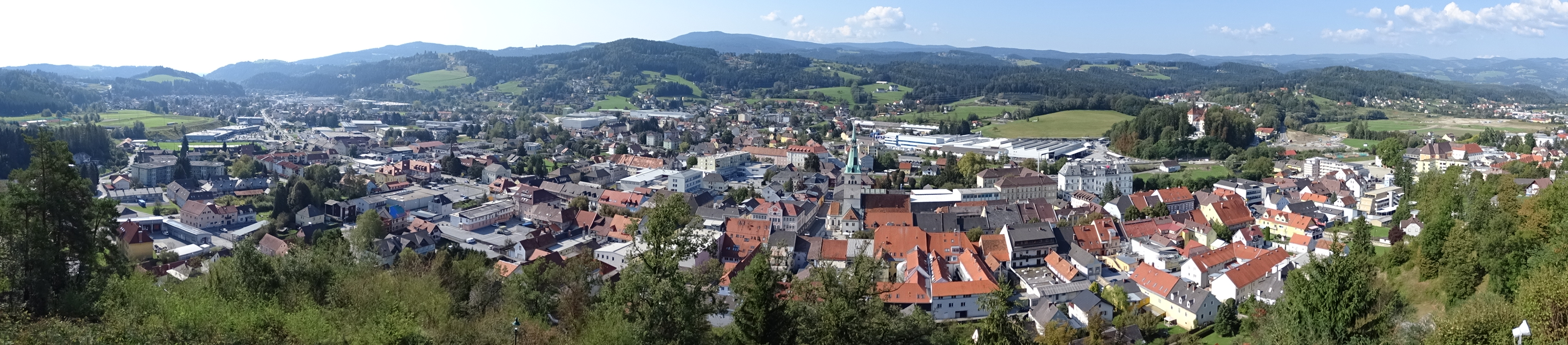
- Panorama of Voitsberg

- Coat of arms

- Location within Austria
- Coordinates: 47°02′N 15°09′E
- Country: Austria
- State: Styria
- District: Voitsberg

Government
  - Mayor: Ernst Meixner (SPÖ)

Area
  - Total: 28.54 km^{2} (11.02 sq mi)
- Elevation: 394 m (1,293 ft)

Population (2018-01-01)
  - Total: 9,403
  - Density: 329.5/km^{2} (853.3/sq mi)
- Time zone: UTC+1 (CET)
  - Summer (DST): UTC+2 (CEST)
- Postal code: A-8570
- Area code: 61625
- Website: www.voitsberg.at

Voitsberg (German pronunciation: [ˈfɔɪ̯t͡sbɛʁk]) is a small city in the district of Voitsberg in Styria, Austria, with a population of c. 9,400 as of 2018. It grew upon the St. Margaret church at the Tregistbach river and was first mentioned in 1220 as Civitas. Remains of the Greisenegg palace and Obervoitsberg castle can be seen. Other objects of interest are its Cityhall Voitsberg, designed by architect Arik Brauer.

== Transport ==
Voitsberg has two stations, Voitsberg and Krems in Steiermark, on the Köflach railway line, which runs between Graz Hauptbahnhof and Köflach. The Styria S-Bahn stops at both stations.

== Notable people ==
=== Sport ===
- Wilhelm Huberts (1938–2022), footballer who played over 400 games and 4 for Austria
- Josef Stering (born 1949), retired footballer, played over 520 games and 26 for Austria
- René Aufhauser (born 1976), football coach and a former player; played about 500 games and 58 for Austria
- Markus Hiden (born 1978) footballer who has played over 220 games and 5 for Austria
- Bernhard Eisel (born 1981), former professional road bicycle racer
- Andreas Lasnik (born 1983), footballer, who has played about 300 games and 1 for Austria
- Daniel Schütz (born 1991), footballer, played over 330 games
- Florian Flecker (born 1995), footballer, played over 250 games
- Albert Vallci (born 1995), footballerplayed over 230 games
- Kevin Danso (born 1998), footballer who has played over 150 games and 16 for Austria

== Twin towns ==
- San Martino Buon Albergo, Italy
