= Tregist village chapel =

Village chapel in western Styria, Austria

Coordinates: 47°4′26.1″N 15°9′32.5″E

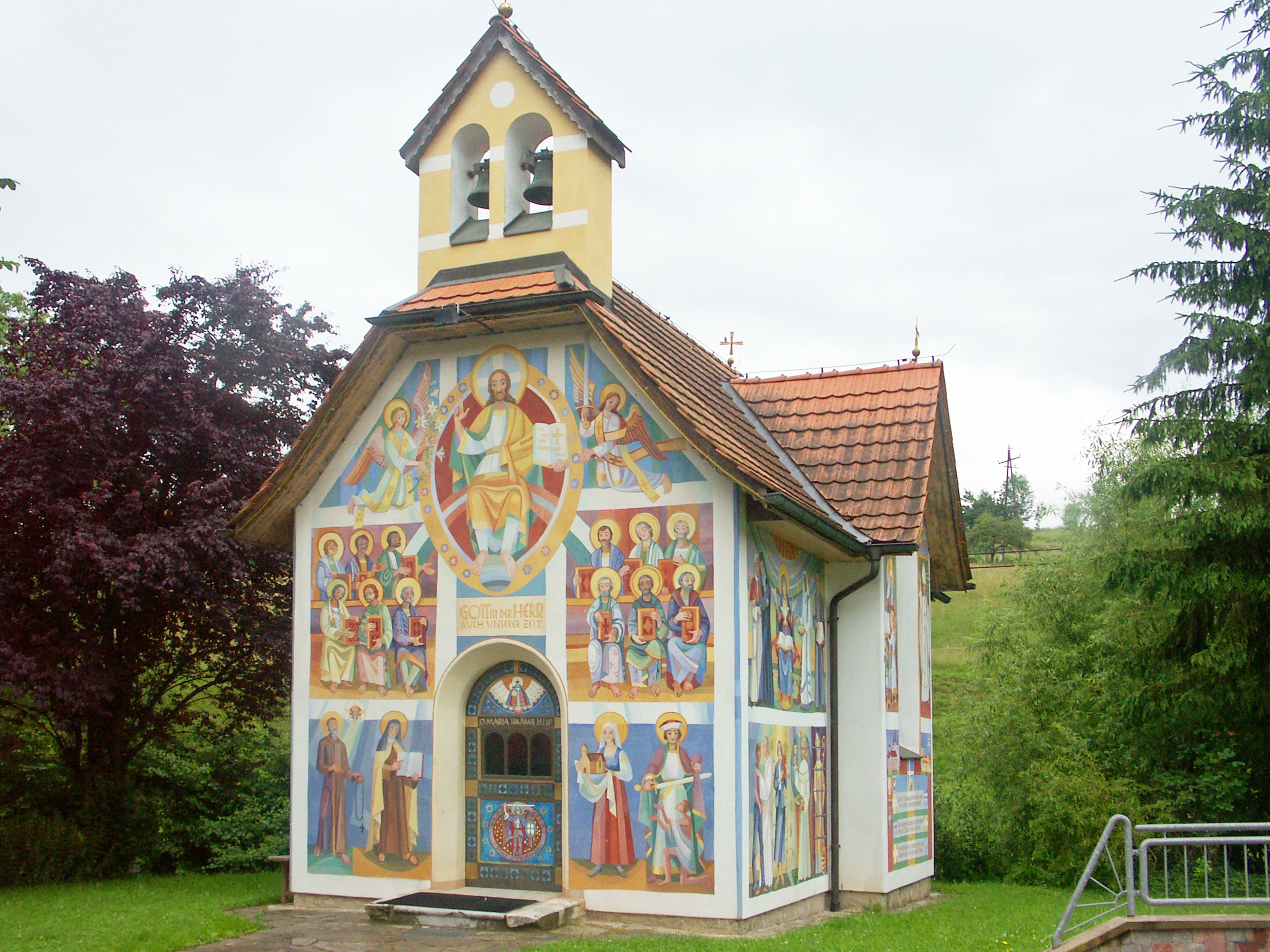
Village chapel Mary, Untier of Knots (2008)

The Tregist village chapel, also known as the Ortskapelle Tregist or the Chapel of Mary, Untier of Knots, is a Roman Catholic chapel located in the municipality of Bärnbach in western Styria. The chapel, dedicated to Holy Mary, is part of the Voitsberg parish and thus belongs to the Voitsberg pastoral area in the Styrian central region of the Graz-Seckau diocese.

The first chapel on the site was consecrated in 1884, destroyed by a flood in the 1950s and subsequently demolished. Between 1986 and 1989, a new building was erected with the help of the local community and designed by the West Styrian sculptor and painter Franz Weiss. Weiss decorated both the exterior walls and the interior as a total work of art using a variety of artistic techniques, and created almost all the artistic design elements of the chapel himself. Only the two stained-glass windows were made by another master according to his designs.

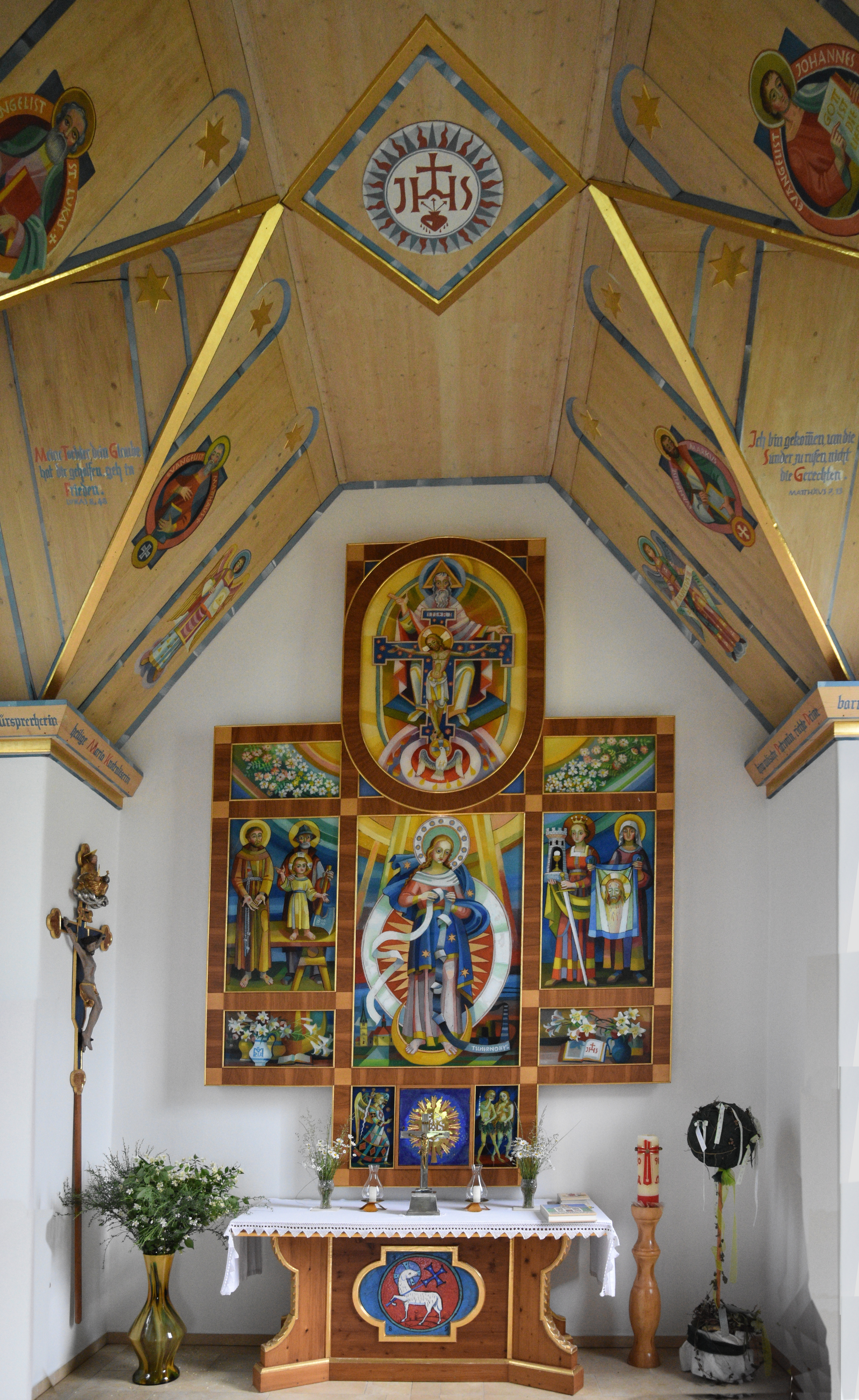
Sanctuary with retable by Franz Weiss

The exterior walls of the chapel are adorned with large, colourful murals depicting biblical motifs with images of saints, popes and people who have rendered outstanding services to the proclamation of the Christian teachings. In addition to saints such as Martin of Tours, Mother Teresa and Hélder Câmara can also be seen. A regional reference is repeatedly made in the motifs, for example with houses from the area surrounding the chapel where Jesus carries the cross. The Pope's visits to Austria are also depicted. The main image on the altar shows Mary untying knots from a ribbon. An inscription on the ribbon and the depiction of the power station refer to the Chernobyl nuclear disaster. At Christmastime, a nativity village is set up around the chapel, consisting of six panels with motifs from the Christmas story. The entire building is a protected monument.

== Location ==
The village chapel is located in the part of the dispersed settlement of Tregisttal belonging to the municipality of Bärnbach, at an altitude of around 470 metres above sea level, on the left bank of the Tregistbach stream. The Tregistbach flows past the chapel about 5 metres to the west, while the Altsteigbach flows about 5 metres to the south. The Altsteigbach runs into the Tregistbach immediately to the south-west of the chapel. Both watercourses form the municipal boundary to the municipality of Voitsberg.

The Tregisttalstraße, which leads from Tregist to Tregisttal and ends in this village, runs directly to the east. The Alaunfabrik inn, which dates back to the former alum factory, is located 10 metres to the east in the municipality of Voitsberg. About 50 metres south-east of the chapel is the former Tregist primary school, which has been converted into a museum of the work of Franz Weiss.

== History ==
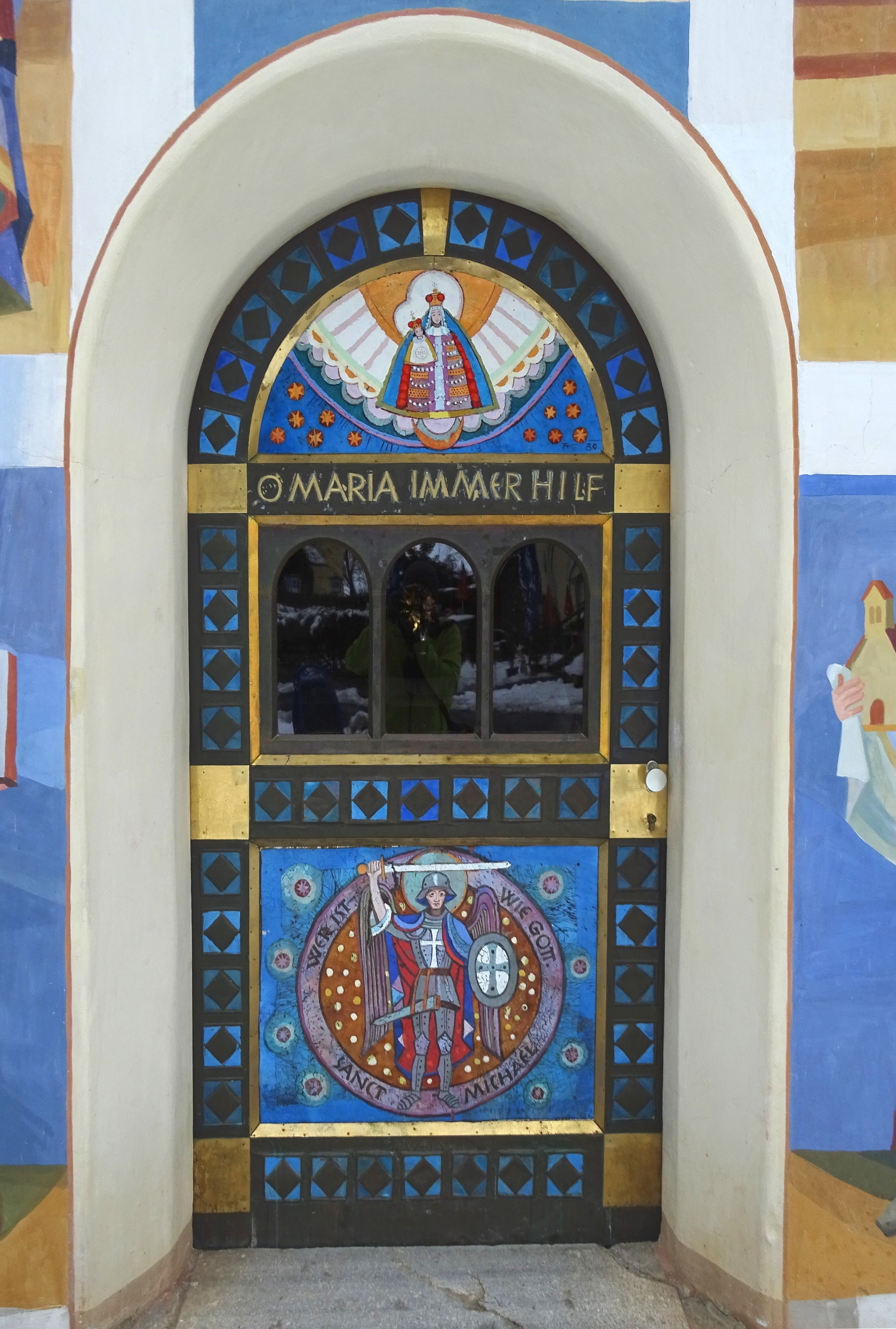
Entrance

To the south of the present village chapel, on the left bank of the Tregistbach stream, was originally a simple chapel from the nearby former alum factory, consecrated in 1884, destroyed by a flood from the Tregistbach around 1955 and subsequently demolished. The artist Franz Weiss lived near the old chapel and cherished it as a place of worship. As a young student of Rudolf Szyszkowitz, Weiss already wanted to paint the old chapel. Shortly after its destruction, he undertook to rebuild the monument in his own style.

Construction of the new place of worship began in the 1980s, with a site better protected from flooding being sought in the immediate vicinity of the old chapel. Like the old chapel, the new one was built on the left bank of the Tregistbach. Annemarie and Engelbert Pignitter donated the land for the new building, which was blessed on 29 June 1986. On the occasion of the blessing, Franz Weiss erected a plaque with a model of the church and the date of the blessing. Due to the fact that the chapel is located in the municipality of Bärnbach, but in the parish of Voitsberg, the construction was supported by grants from both municipalities. The actual construction of the chapel began in September 1986, and on 5 April 1987 the completion of the building work was celebrated with the blessing of the gable crosses. On 12 April 1987, the two bells donated by the local people were consecrated, and on 15 October 1989, the chapel itself was consecrated. Franz Weiss continued to work on the decoration of the building until 1992.

Paintings on the
east wall
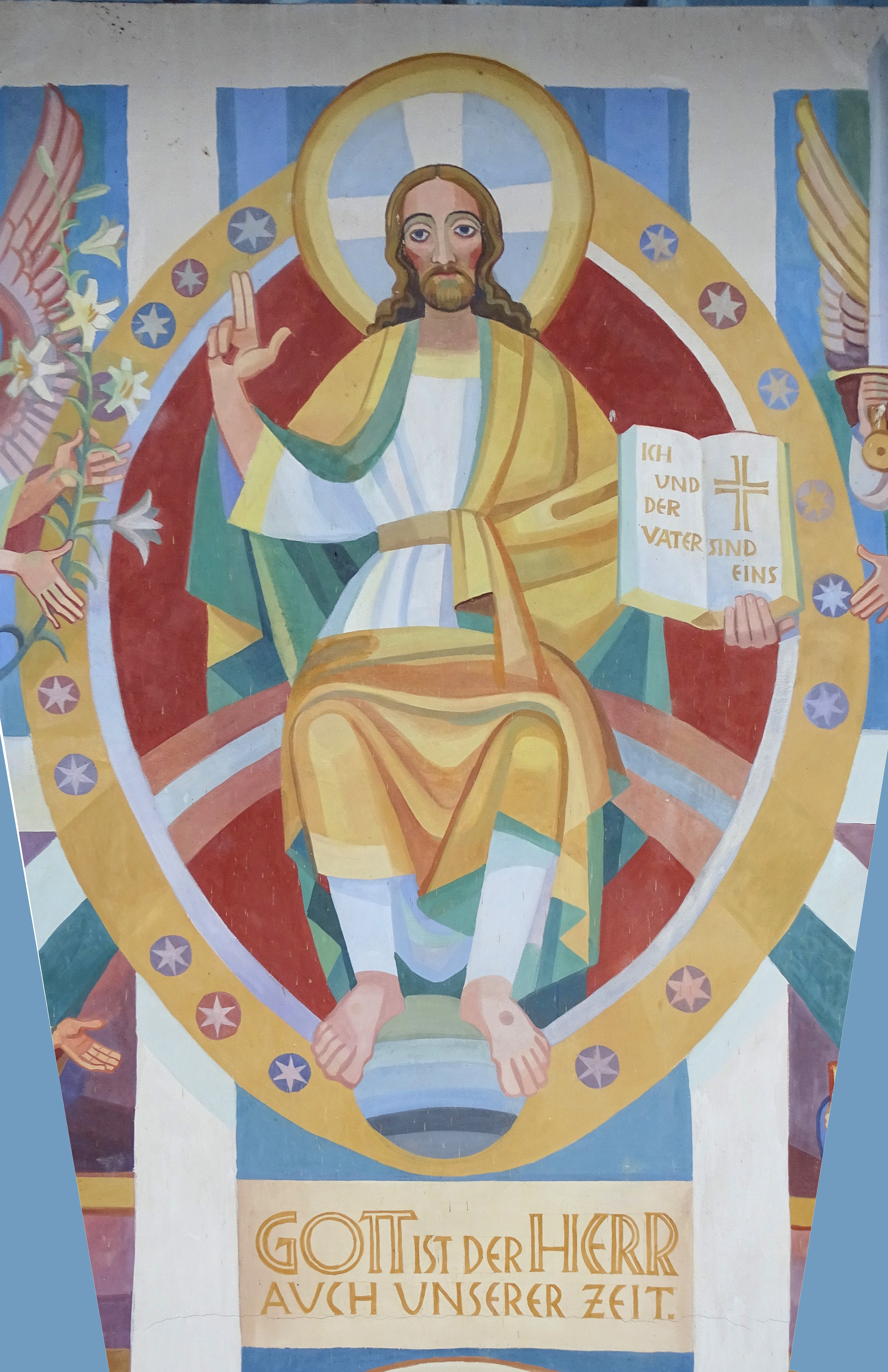
Christ Pantocrator above the entrance

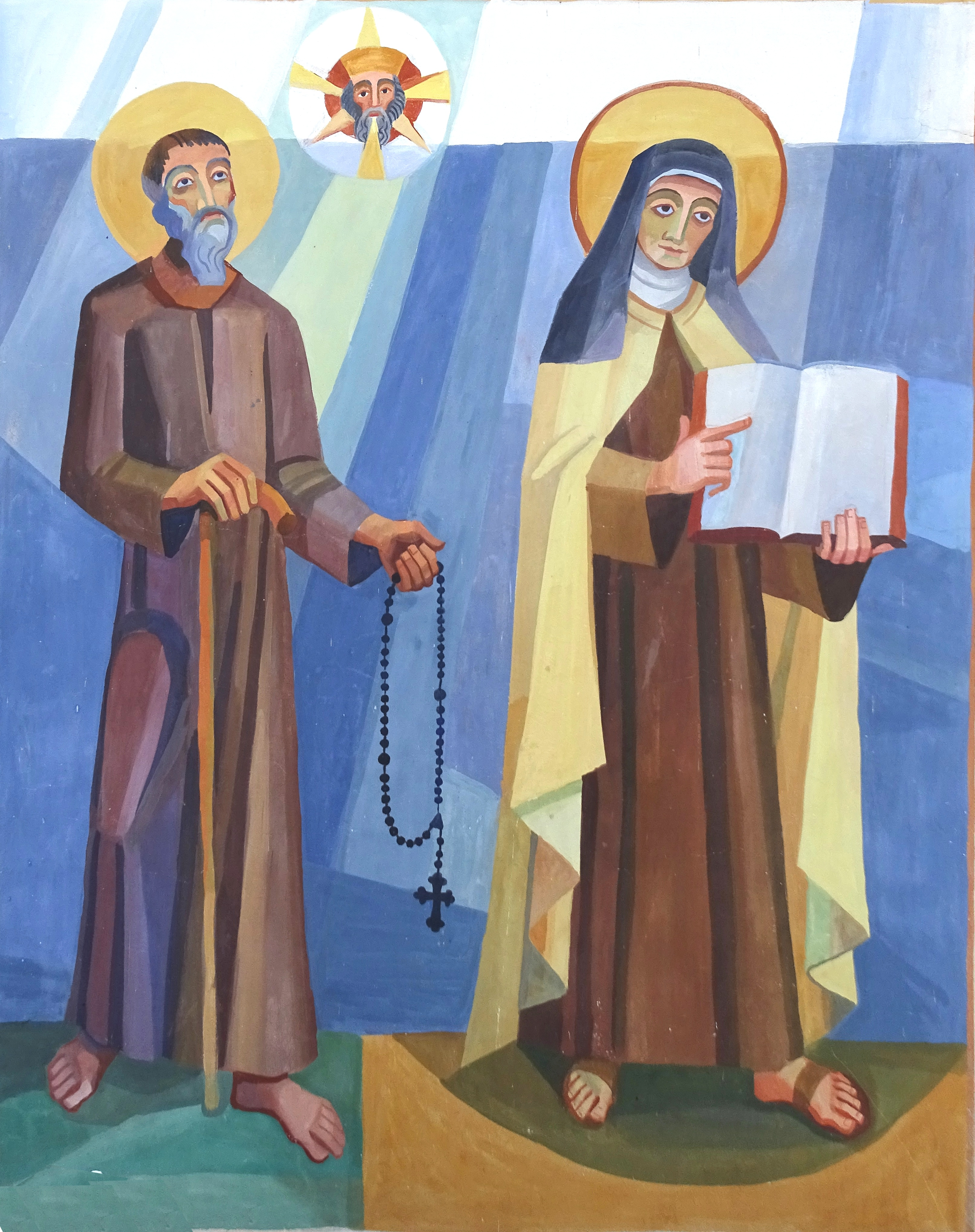
Nicholas of Flue and Teresa of Ávila

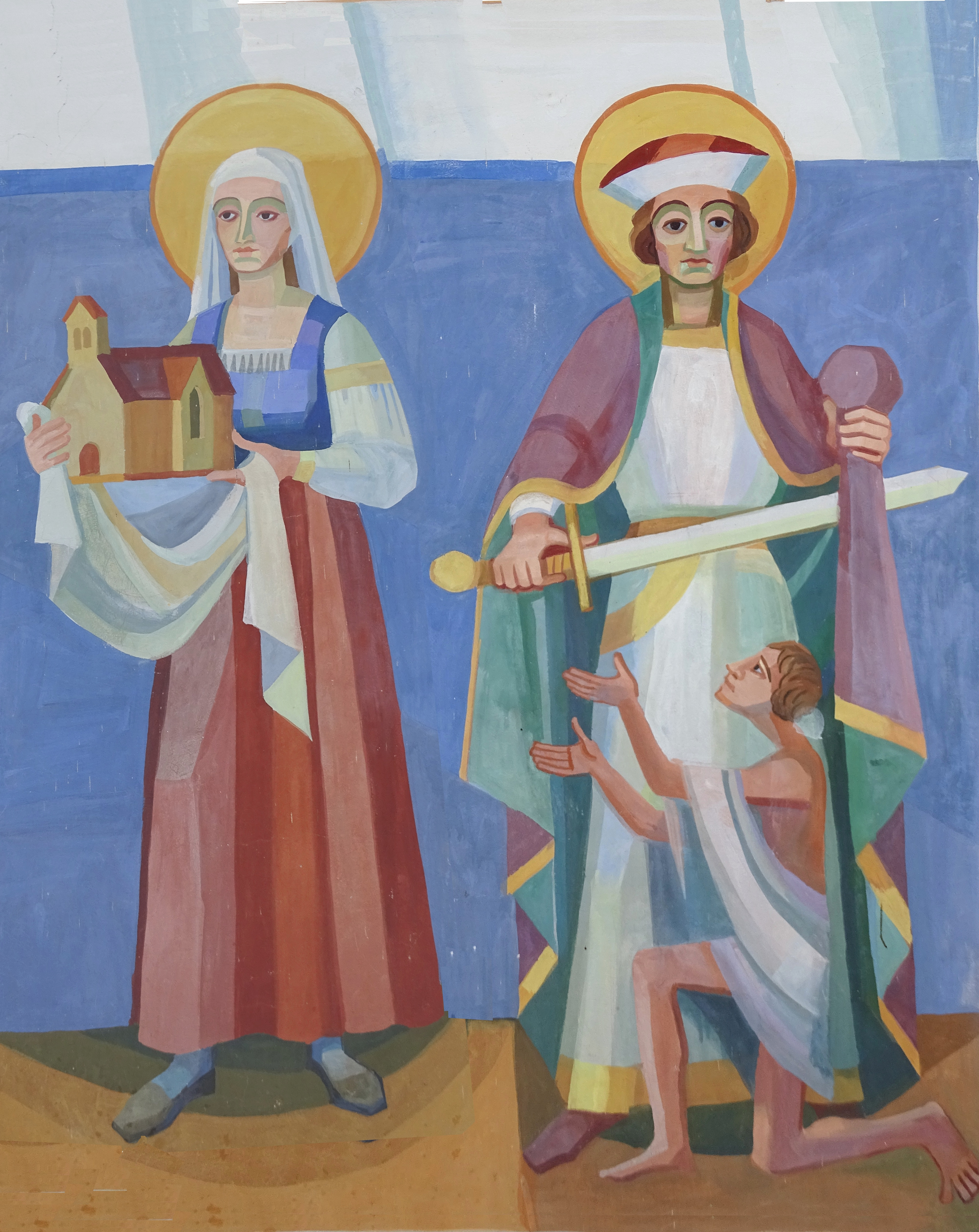
Hemma of Gurk and Martin of Tours

== Architecture and design ==
The chapel has a cruciform floor plan and faces north-west. The layout is created by the transept in front of the chancel. The transept is shorter than originally planned. The architect Anton Walter was responsible for the technical planning, while Hubert Grinschgl was in charge of the construction. Karl and Peter Weiss, two brothers of Franz Weiss, carried out the interior work. Franz Weiss decorated the interior and exterior of the new chapel between 1986 and 1992. The interior walls and ceiling, as well as three exterior walls, are covered with large-scale secco and tempera paintings.

=== Exterior design ===
The plastered exterior walls are smooth and, except for the north-western side, are decorated with numerous murals by Franz Weiss. There is a round-arched entrance door in the south-east. An open ridge turret with the chapel bells rises above the entrance door. Both the nave and transept have tiled gabled roofs that curve slightly outwards towards the bottom. On the south-east side of the nave, the edge of the gabled roof above the entrance is hipped. The roof ridges above the gables in the north-west, south-west and north-east each have a sphere with a cross on top. The ridge turret ends in a sphere with an attached patriarchal cross. On each side of the transept, light enters the interior of the chapel through a high arched window.

The round-arched entrance door to the chapel is decorated with copper repoussage and enamel paintings. The lower door panel depicts Michael the Archangel standing before a disc of the world with his sword raised. The world disc is surrounded by the inscription "Who is like God. Saint Michael". The arched panel of the door shows Our Lady of Mariazell in a mandorla above the inscription "O MARY ALWAYS HELP". The two panels are separated by a mullion, through which it is possible to see the interior of the chapel.

In front of the chapel, on the municipal border between Bärnbach and Voitsberg, there is a border plaque designed in enamel by Franz Weiss. On it stands an angel with one hand on each of the coats of arms of the two municipalities. At his feet are the coats of arms of Austria and Styria as well as the coat of arms of Pope John Paul II, which, however, has silver (white) instead of gold (yellow) colouring.

=== Murals ===
Except for the west wall, all the exterior walls are decorated with secco paintings, which also divide the walls. They were all painted by Franz Weiss between 1986 and 1992, and the colourful murals can be described as unusual.

==== East wall ====
The east wall of the chapel is divided into eight panels by bands. These boundaries are fluid and are partially crossed by the figures depicted. The main picture above the entrance depicts Jesus as Pantocrator or ruler of the world in a mandorla. He has raised his right hand in blessing, in his left hand he holds an open Bible and with his feet he stands on a globe. Instead of sitting on a throne, Jesus is seated on a rainbow in the Austrian national colours of red, white and red. The mandorla is painted dark red and framed in gold. Circles with stars are painted around the wide frame. Jesus is flanked by two kneeling angels, Archangel Gabriel with white lilies on the left and Archangel Michael with a sword in his hand on the right. Below the image of Jesus, directly above the entrance, is the sentence "GOD IS THE LORD ALSO OF OUR TIME". Diagonally below the image of Jesus, six of the twelve apostles are depicted on each side of the entrance and the inscription. The rainbow throne on which Jesus sits reaches down to the apostles, where it takes on the Styrian colours of white and green. The apostles hold Bibles in their hands and are partly depicted with speaking gestures as proclaimers of the Holy Scriptures. Below the apostles is the lowest pictorial level with other saints, who are seen as witnesses of living faith. Two saints are depicted on each side of the entrance door. On the left-hand side is Nicholas of Flüe, a Swiss hermit with political influence, wearing a brown habit and leaning on a stick. He holds a rosary in his left hand. The face of Christ the King hovers in a circle above his head. Next to him stands Teresa of Ávila in the habit of the Carmelite nuns. She is holding an open book. Her depiction is a reference to the nearby Carmelite convent on the Holy Mountain near Bärnbach. These two saints are representatives of the vita contemplativa, who dedicated their lives to the study of the Holy Scriptures. On the right are two representatives of the vita activa, in other words, faith lived in deeds. The first representative to the right of the entrance door is Hemma of Gurk, known as church founder, who is holding a chapel model in her hands. The final figure on the right is Martin of Tours. He is cutting up his cloak and giving part of it to the beggar kneeling before him.

==== North wall ====
Paintings on the north
and south walls
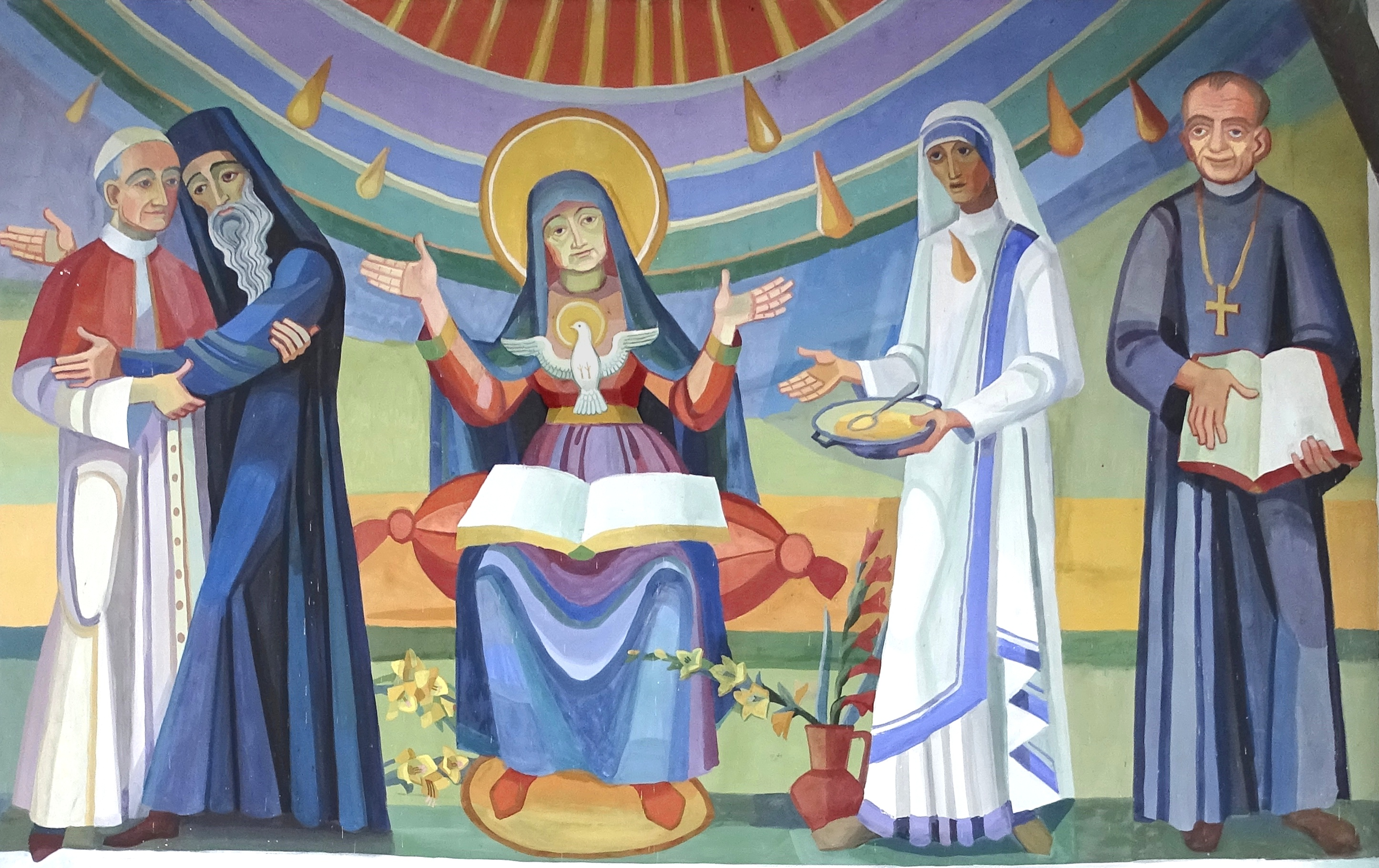
Detail of the north wall: Paul VI and Athenagoras, the Holy Spirit in the form of a dove and Mary, Mother Teresa and Dom Hélder Câmara

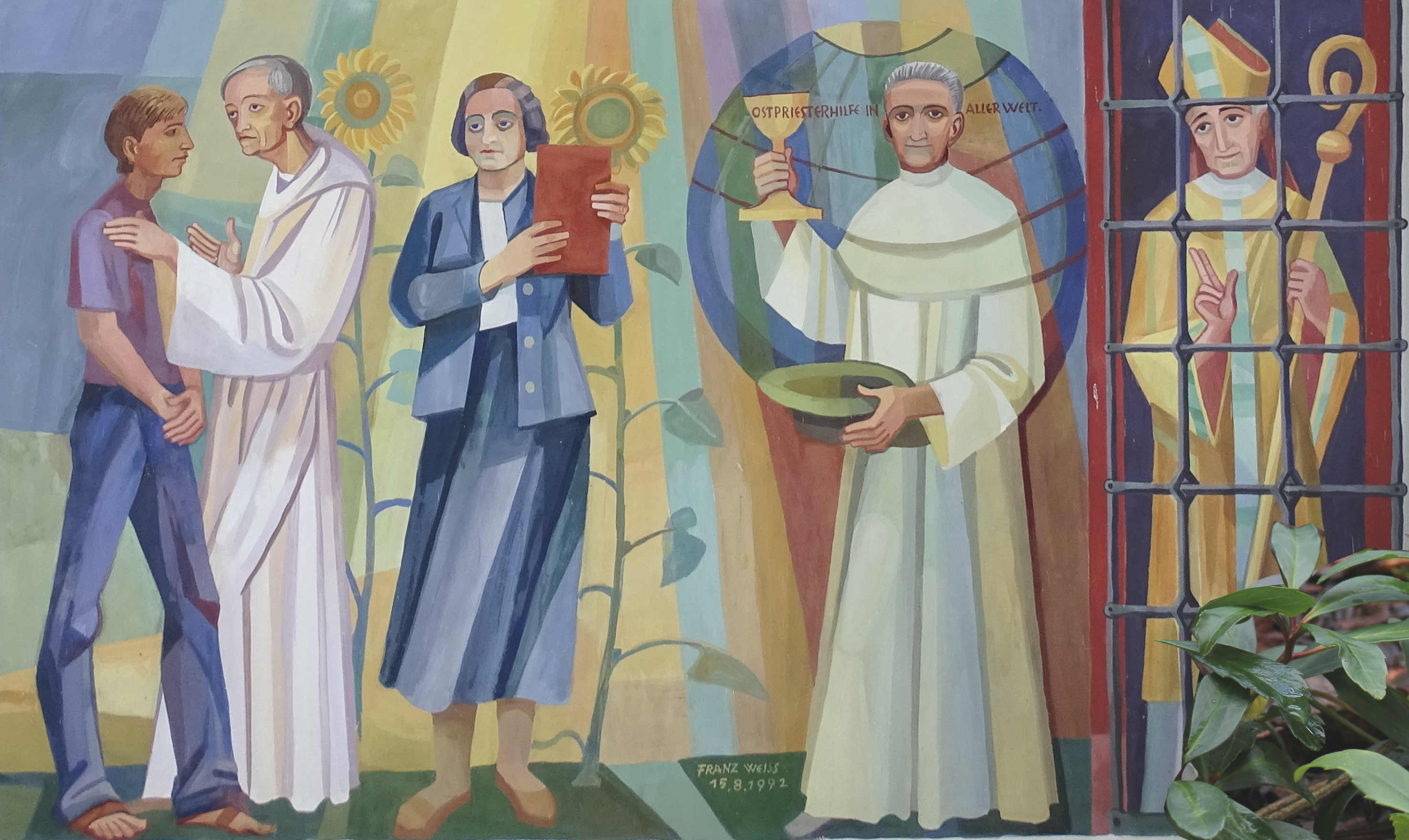
Brother Roger Schutz, Adrienne von Speyr, Werenfried of Straaten, Jószef Mindszenty

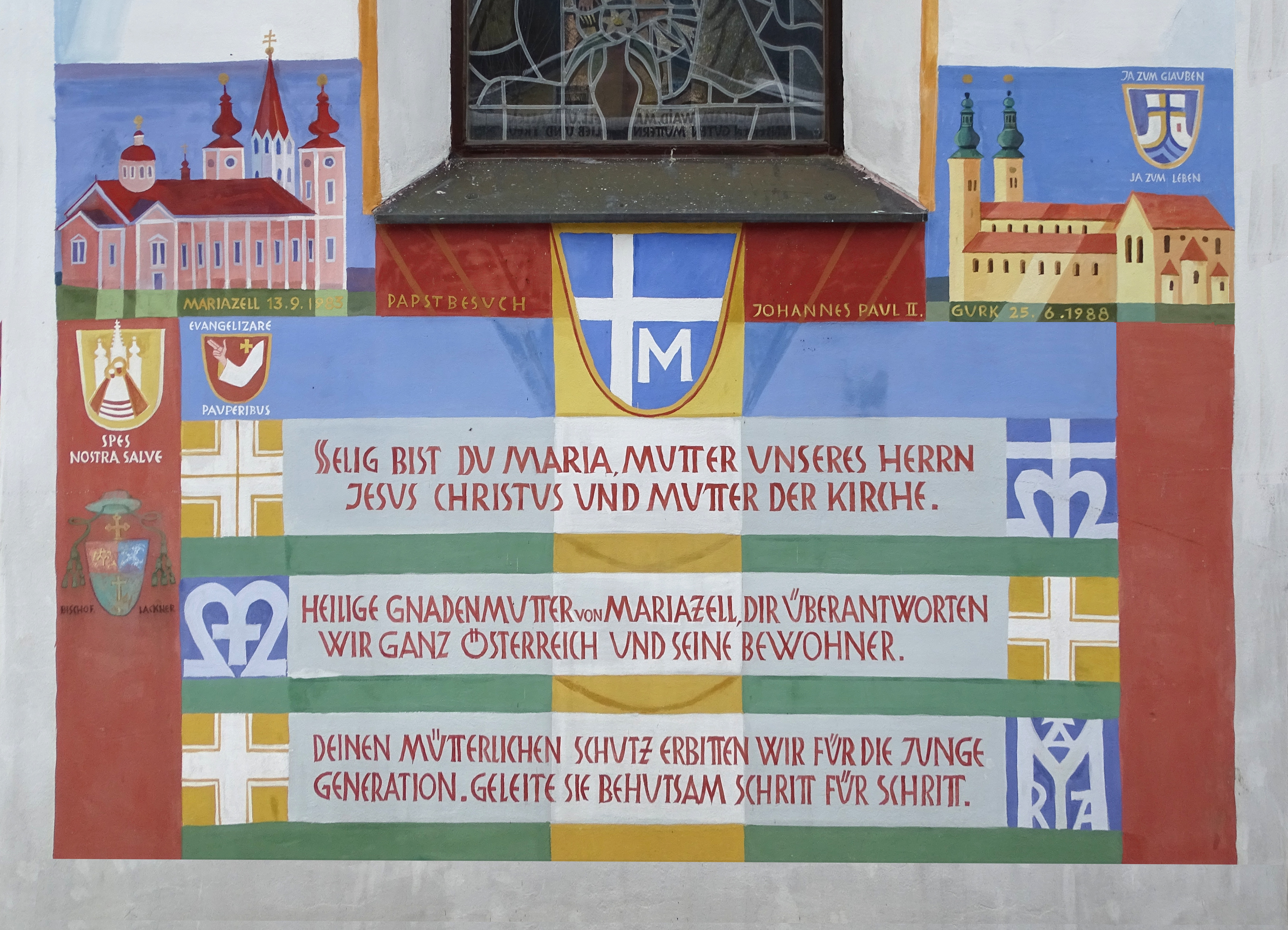
Prayer of the Pope during his visit to Mariazell and depictions of the Mariazell Basilica and Gurk Cathedral

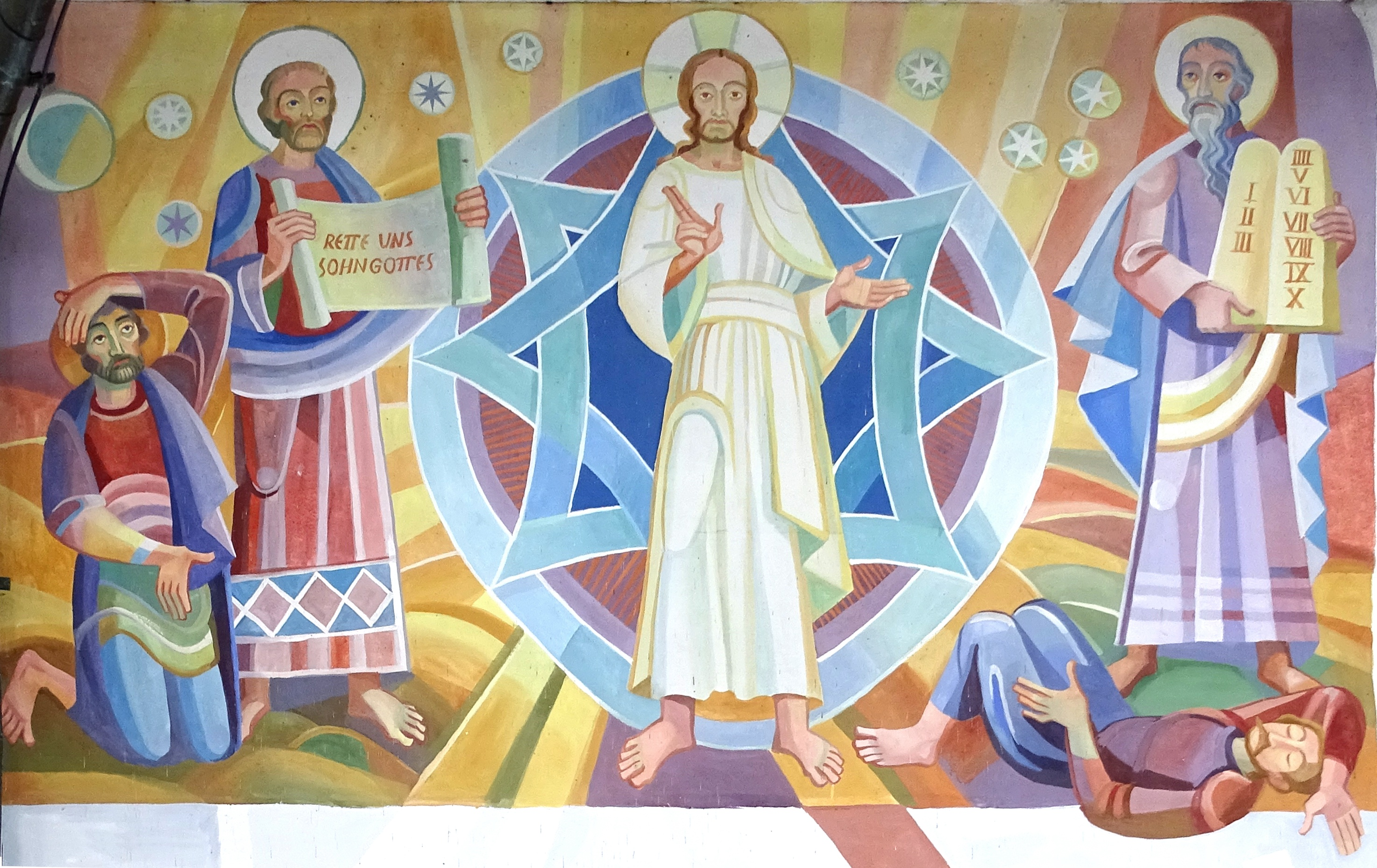
Transfiguration of Jesus on Mount Tabor

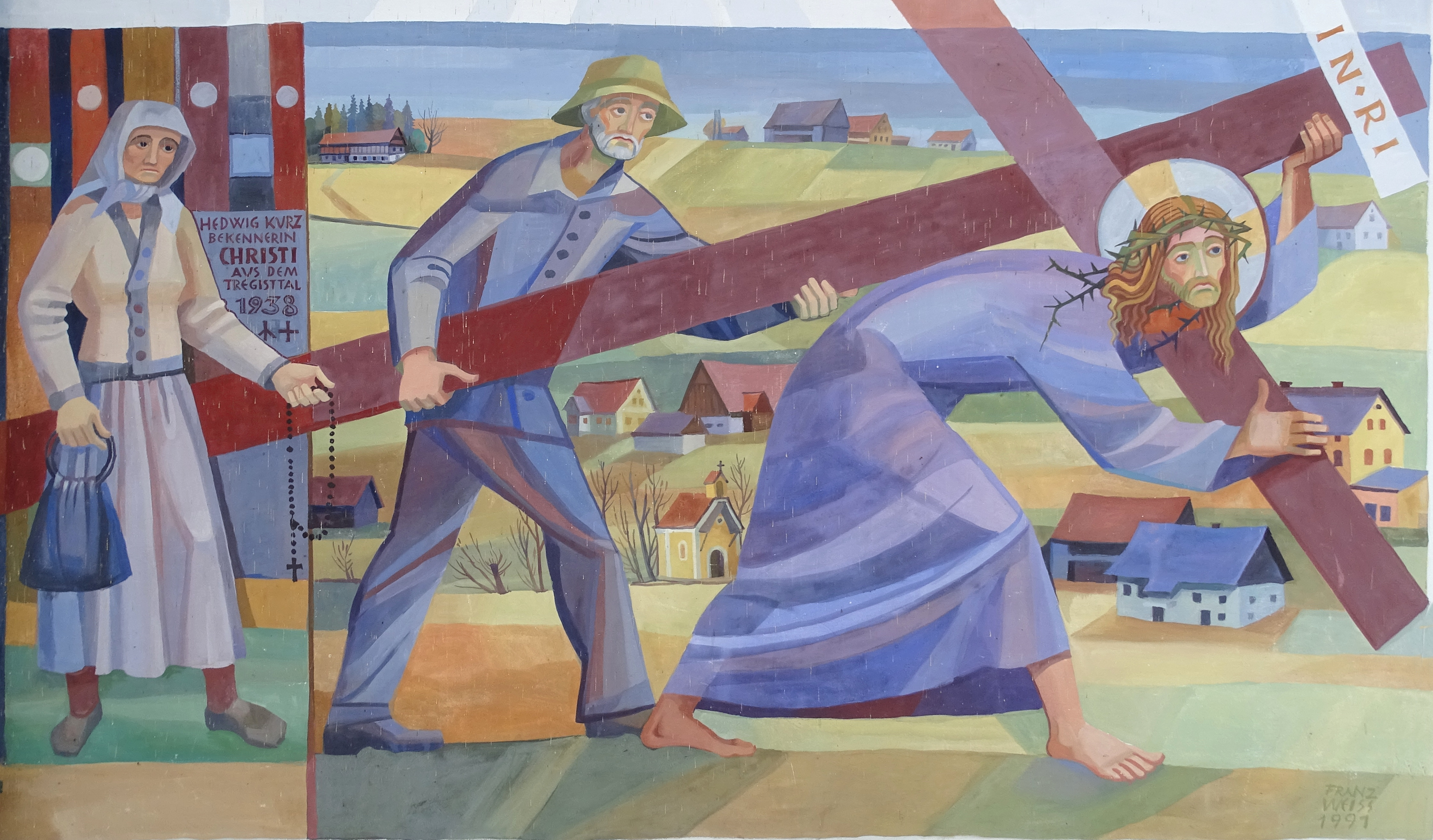
5th Station of the Way of the Cross: Instead of Simon of Cyrene, a local farmer helps Jesus to carry the cross

The north wall is divided into seven panels. It continues the series with personalities of faith in more recent times. The wheel of heaven with golden spokes hovers above the figures in the upper panel of the nave. Drops of grace fall from the wheel to the figures. In the centre of this panel is a depiction of Mary. In her lap lies the open Bible, over which the Holy Spirit hovers in the form of a dove. Like the dove's wings, Mary is also spreading her arms. Franz Weiss incorporated personal references in the design of Mary and gave her the facial features of his mother. At her feet are yellow gladioli. To the right of Mary is a depiction of Pope Paul VI's meeting with Patriarch Athenagoras of Constantinople on 5 January 1964 in Jerusalem. This meeting led to a breakthrough in relations between the Roman Catholic Church and the Greek Orthodox Church. The depiction shows both of them making the gesture of greeting peace. On Mary's left is Mother Teresa, the Indian nun known worldwide for her commitment to the poor, the homeless, the sick and the dying. In her left hand she is holding a bowl of soup, symbolising the feeding of the poor, and a drop of grace touches her heart. Next to Mother Teresa is the archbishop and liberation theologian Dom Hélder Câmara, who campaigned for social justice and human rights in Brazil. The lower part of the picture is criss-crossed by streaks of light; they appear to radiate downwards from the celestial wheel in the upper part of the picture. On the left-hand edge stands Brother Roger Schutz, the founder of the ecumenical Taizé community, where thousands of young people seek religious introspection every year. He is wearing a light-coloured habit and is in conversation with a youth. Next to him stands the Swiss doctor, mystic and spiritual writer Adrienne von Speyr. She is flanked by two sunflowers and holds up a book as a symbol of her numerous writings. Next is Father Werenfried van Straaten, also known as the "bacon priest" and founder of the aid organisation Aid to the Church in Need. He stands in front of a globe, holds up a chalice with his right hand and carries an upturned bowler hat in his left hand, which he used to collect donations for his aid organisation. The final figure on the right is the Hungarian Archbishop József Mindszenty, who is behind bars and has been imprisoned several times for speaking out against injustice. He is considered a symbolic figure of resistance against soviet rule in Hungary.

The northern wall of the transept is dedicated to the papal visits of John Paul II to Mariazell on 13 September 1983 and to Gurk on 25 June 1988. In the pediment above the window, under the Eye of Providence, is the Mother of Grace of Mariazell. On either side of the Mother of Grace is a candelabra with three candles. In the background there are vines and roses. On the left of the window is Saint Anne teaching the young Mary to read with a book. Saint Anne has placed her right foot on a stool behind which is a vase containing Mary's lilies and daylilies. Mary's white lilies are leaning towards her. To the right of the window is John Paul II. Below Anna is the Basilica of Mariazell with the date of the Pope's visit. To the right is Gurk Cathedral, with the date of the visit and the coat of arms chosen at the time. Between these two images, and directly below the window, is a column bearing the papal arms of John Paul II, again in white instead of yellow. On three banners below the window is the Pope's consecration prayer, which he said in front of the Mariazell Altar of Grace. The coat of arms of the diocesan bishop Johann Weber and the coat of arms of the auxiliary bishop Franz Lackner are painted on the left edge of this area, below the Basilica of Mariazell.

The upper panel on the north wall of the chancel shows a guardian angel with two children playing and dancing in front of him. The lower panel is not figurative, but shows a brief description of the building with a list of the people involved in its construction.

==== South wall ====
The dominant motifs on the south wall are biblical scenes of the Passion and Resurrection. Like the north wall, it is also divided into seven panels. The upper panel on the nave shows the Transfiguration of Jesus on Mount Tabor, as described in the Gospel: Jesus takes three of his disciples, two of whom can be seen in the painting, to the top of the mountain, where his appearance changes and Moses and Elijah appear next to him (Luke 9:28–36). Jesus is clothed in white, in front of a geometric decorative form in the symbolic blue of the sky. Jesus has raised his left hand in blessing. On his left is Moses with the Ten Commandments, on his right the prophet Elijah. The stars of heaven and the crescent moon shine in the background of the scene. The lower picture shows the fifth station of the Way of the Cross: Simon of Cyrene helps Jesus to carry the cross (Matthew 27:32). Here, however, it is not Simon but a local farmer who is helping him. The background creates a local reference, as one can recognise the home of Franz Weiss as well as several farms in the surrounding area and the old chapel of Tregisttal. Jesus' robe is purple, the colour of the Passion, and this colour can also be seen in the farmer's clothing. An old woman with a handbag and a rosary stands on the left-hand side of the picture field, on the longitudinal bar of the cross. It is Hedwig Kurz, a woman from the Tregist, to whom Franz Weiss has dedicated a monument. Kurz undertook a pilgrimage on foot to Rome from autumn 1937 to Easter 1938. The crossbeam of the cross protrudes upwards out of the picture field and becomes a ray of light on which the transfigured Jesus stands in the upper part of the picture.

Paintings on the
transept and chancel
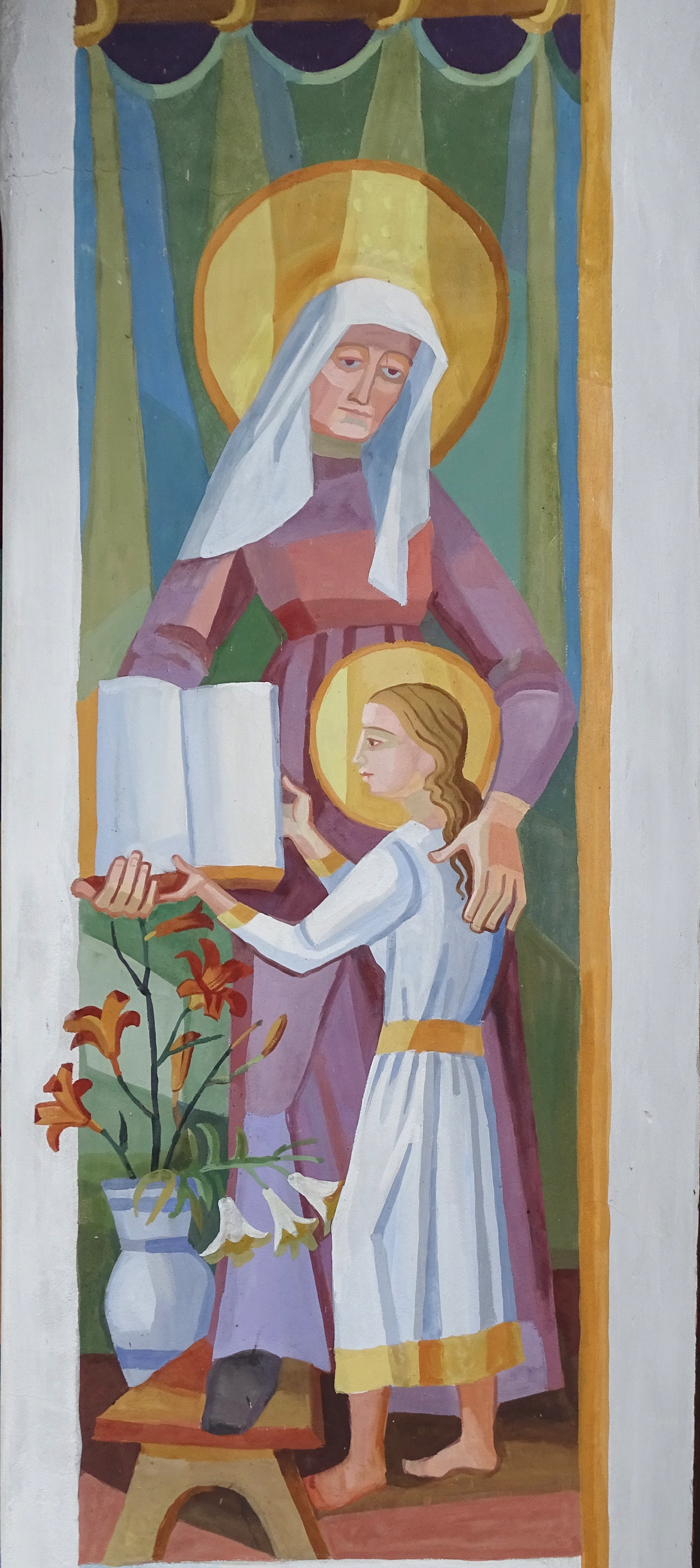
Mother Anne with Maria on the north wall

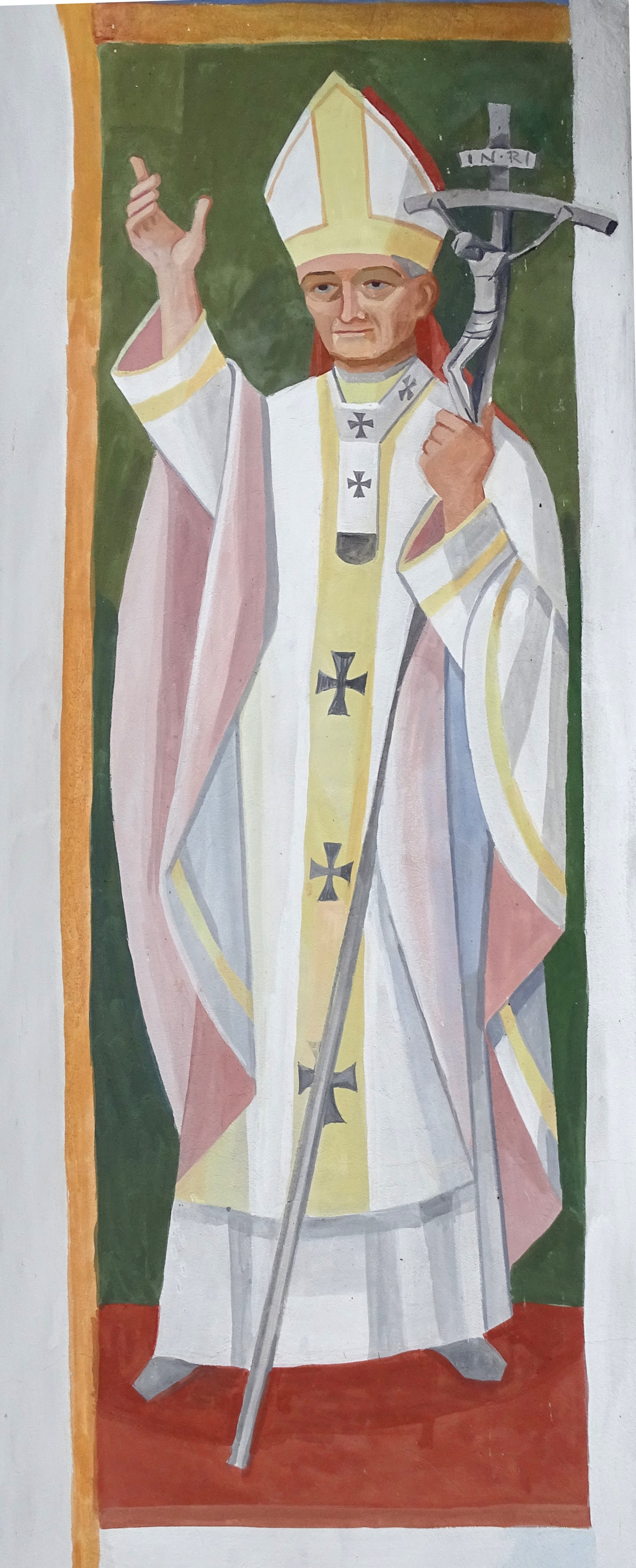
John Paul II on the north wall

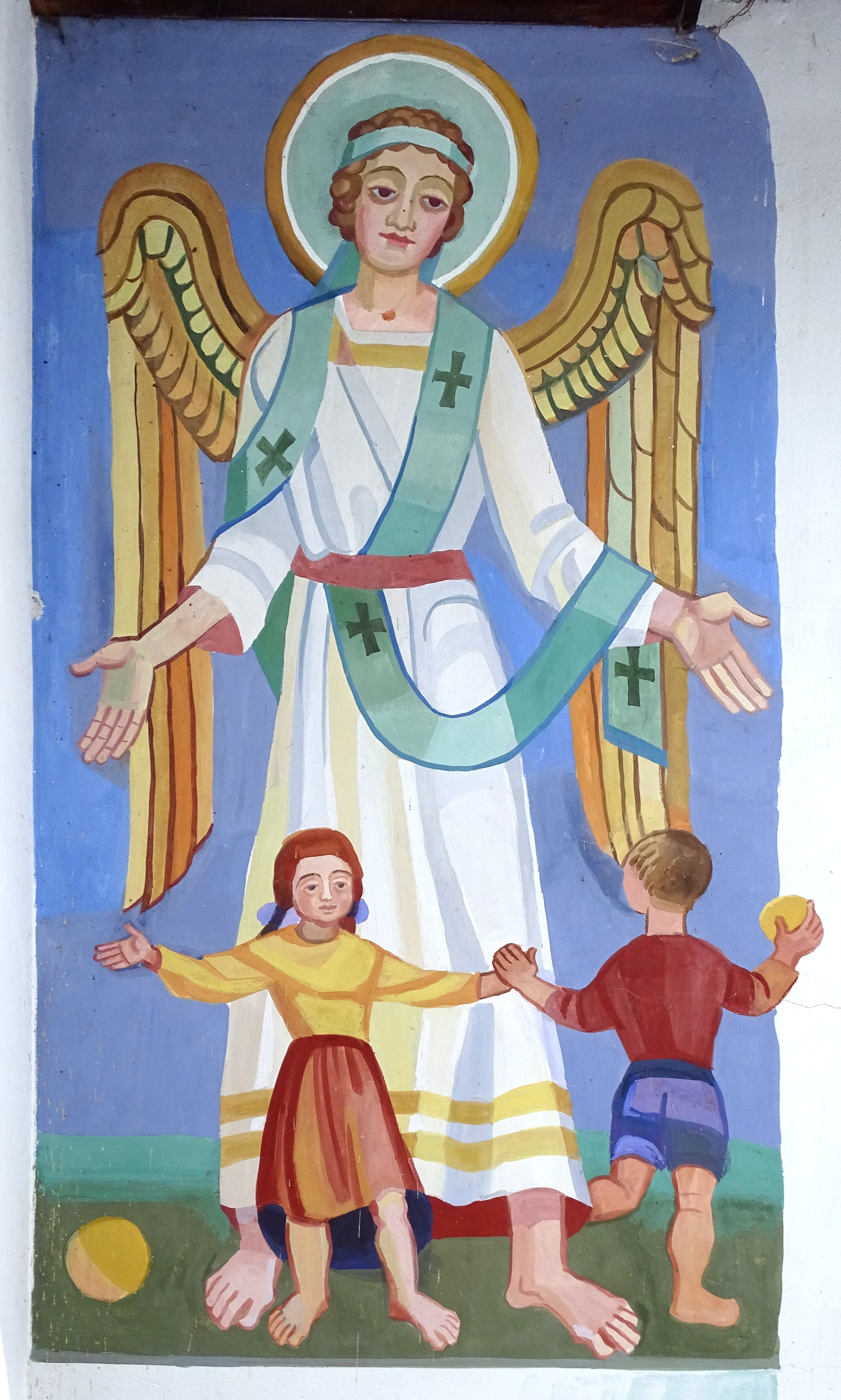
Guardian angel on the north wall

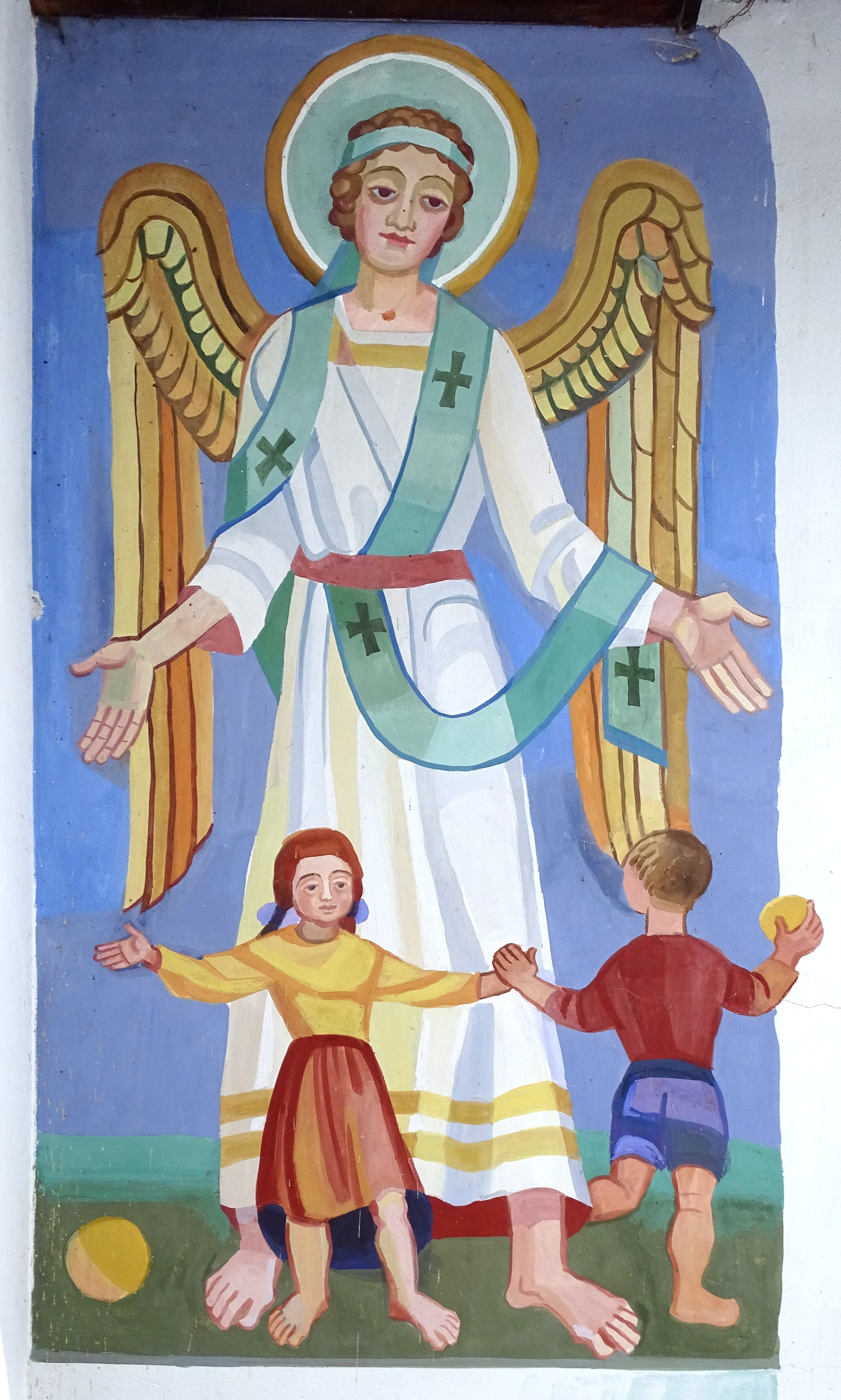
Mary Magdalene on the south wall

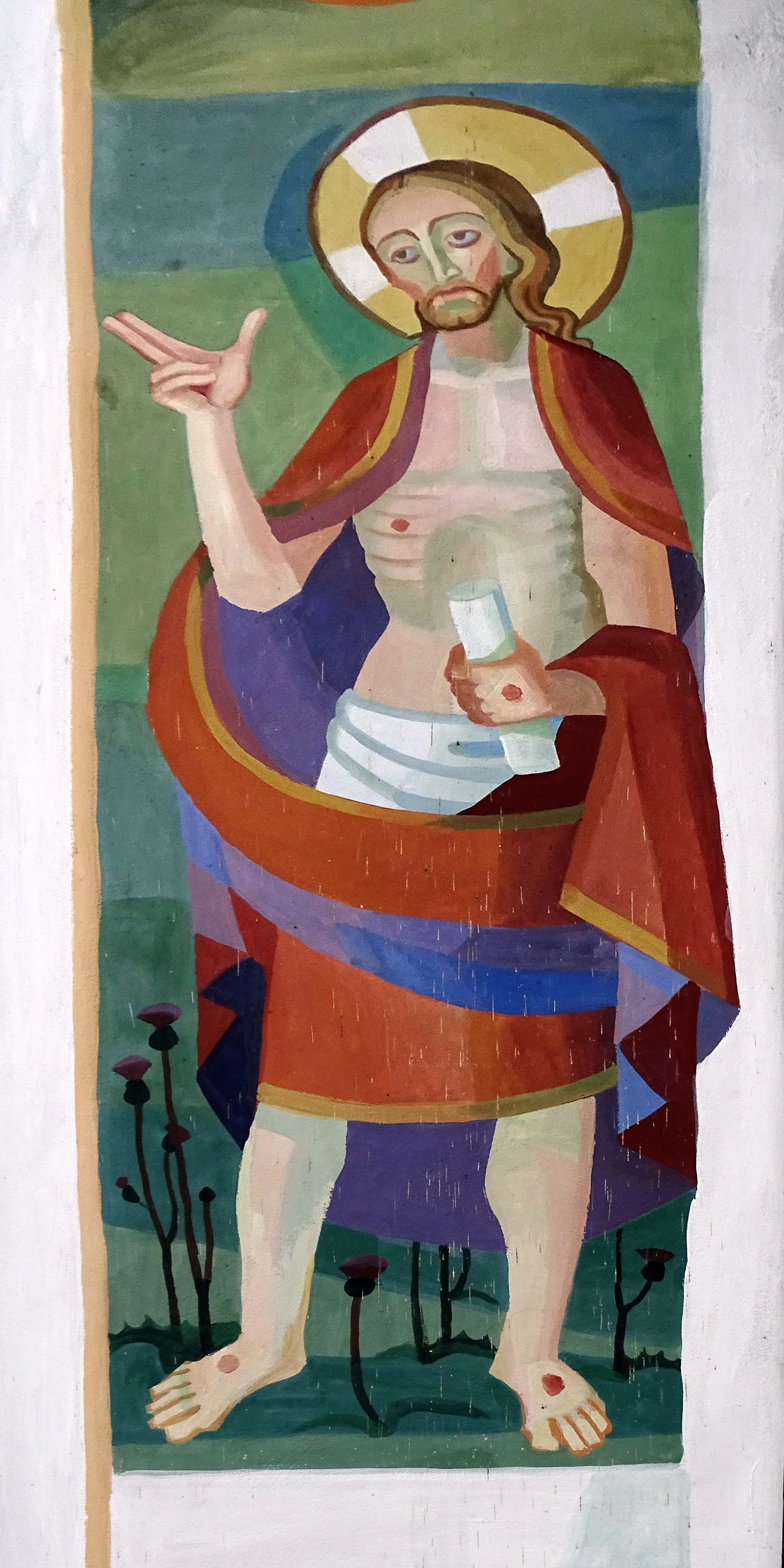
The Risen Christ on the south wall

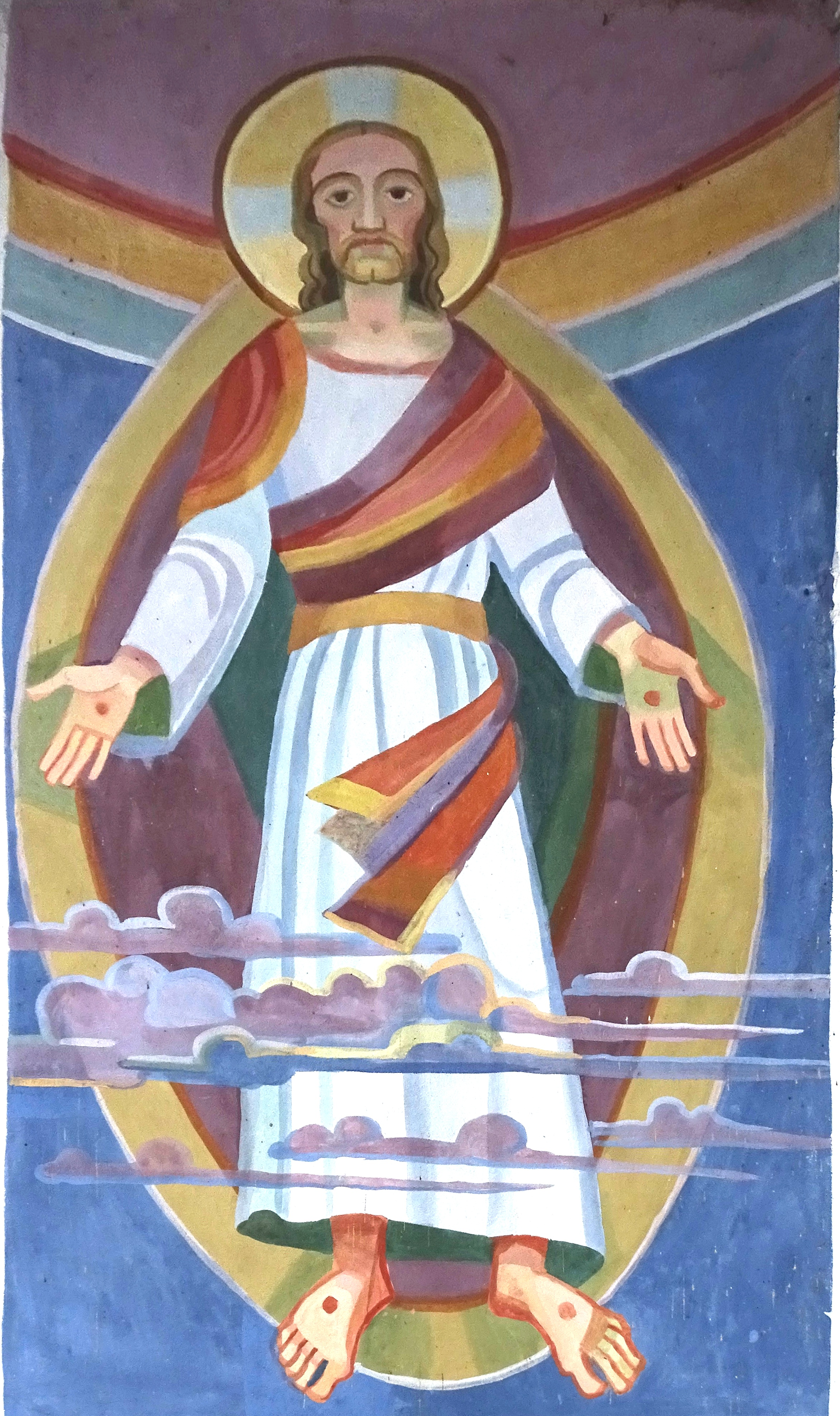
Ascension on the south wall

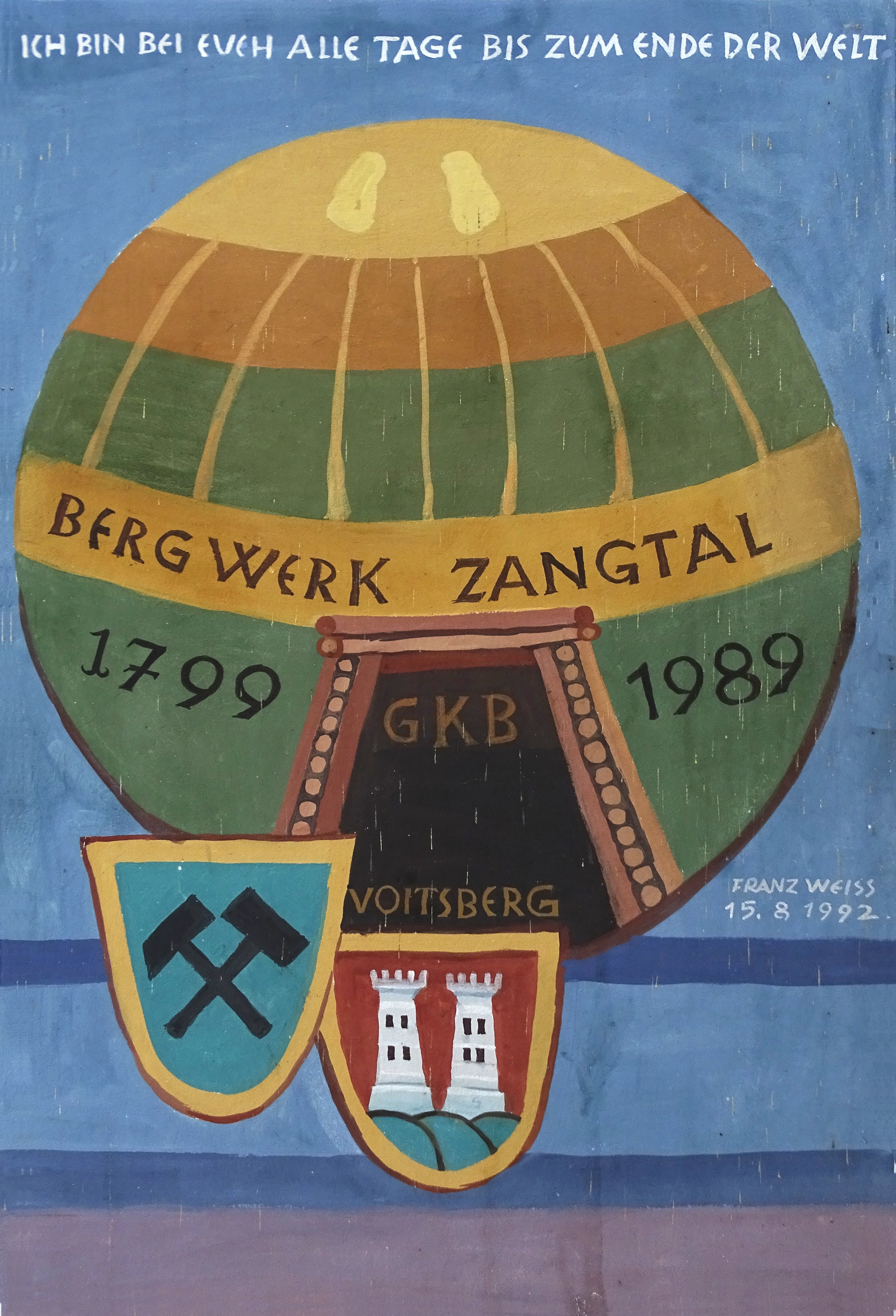
Footprints of Jesus in the world on the south wall

The south wall of the transept shows scenes from the Resurrection of Jesus. An angel is seated at the empty tomb in the pediment. To the right below the angel is a coat of arms with the Lamb of God. On the left, below the angel, the Holy Blood flows from a cross and is collected in three chalices. Below the chalices is the parish church of Voitsberg. To the right of the window is the resurrected Jesus standing in a field of thistles. Opposite him, to the left of the window, Mary Magdalene is kneeling in a field of orange daylilies, looking at him (John 2:11–18). Jesus is depicted in the tomb in the field below the window. A band of evergreens runs underneath. On either side of the tomb is a candlestick with three candles on the left and two on the right, symbolising the stigmata. Five ears of corn sprout from the stigmata, each forming a host. The inscription "THIS IS THE BREAD FOR THE LIFE OF THE WORLD" runs between the ears and the tomb.

The upper panel on the south wall of the sanctuary shows Jesus ascending into heaven. In the mandorla he disappears from the view of his disciples through the clouds (Luke 24:50–53). He has left his footprints on the globe in the image below. The representation again has a regional reference. The entrance to a mine is embedded in the globe, which an inscription identifies as the entrance to the Zangtal mine, where the Graz-Köflach Railway and Mining Company, among others, mined coal from 1799 to 1989. Below the entrance to the mine is the coat of arms of the town of Voitsberg.

=== Interior design ===
The interior walls are smoothly plastered. The roof truss is clad with a wooden ceiling made of bleached spruce wood, into which several flat and high round arched niches are set. In front of the altar, a cross, three merging hearts and an alpha and omega are carved into the floor. The word "Maria" and the date of the chapel's consecration are inscribed below the hearts.

=== Ceiling paintings ===
The wooden ceiling is decorated with panel paintings by Franz Weiss. The niches in the ceiling are framed in blue and gold and decorated with golden stars. Eight angels and the four evangelists are depicted between the niches. On the left side of the nave, there is an angel with flowers, and next to him, wearing a crown and surrounded by flowers, are the angels of interior prayer and of victory, with a wreath of flowers and a cross-staff. Opposite them, on the right-hand side of the nave, are the Archangel Raphael with the young Tobias, the Angel of Praise with a guitar and the Angel of Contemplation with a book. In the choir, on the left, there is an angel with the Eye of Providence and, on the right, the Angel of Eternal Adoration with a scroll. The crossing bears the monogram of Christ IHS. In the surrounding cornice there is a prayer by Pope John XXIII; the quotations in the window niches are from the four Gospels.

== Features ==
Two of the items in the chapel's inventory, the processional cross and the Holy Fountain, come from the old predecessor building. Franz Weiss transformed the processional cross into a Trinity cross, which now hangs on the wall to the left of the altar. Above the crucified Jesus are God the Father and the Holy Spirit as a dove.

=== Altar ===
The altar, designed by Franz Weiss with a reverse glass painting in acrylic colours on plexiglass, shows the main image of Mary, Untier of Knots. The name and the depiction go back to a painting in Saint Peter's Abbey in Augsburg. The ribbon symbolises humanity's connection to God, broken by original sin, like a knot that Mary unties. Weiss also chose the motif to express his gratitude for the guidance in his life that he attributed to his devotion to Mary. The painting in Tregist was created under the impression of the Chernobyl nuclear disaster in April 1986. Mary's left foot features the nuclear power plant and the knotted dark ribbon reads "Chernobyl". At Mary's right foot are the Voitsberg Parish Church and the Voitsberg Saint Michael's Church. The white ribbon, no longer knotted, falls from Mary's hands towards the two churches. Above the main image of the retable, the Holy Trinity is depicted as the so-called Mercy Seat. In the panel to the left of the main image are Francis of Assisi with his stigmata and Joseph of Nazareth as a carpenter with the baby Jesus. On the right are Barbara with her sword, tower and chalice, and Veronica with her handkerchief. Below the main image, in the predella of the altar, there are two panels that form a single unit. On the left is Archangel Michael with the flaming sword, and on the right are Adam and Eve, expelled from Paradise (Genesis 3:7). The Lamb of God is depicted on the mensa of the altar.

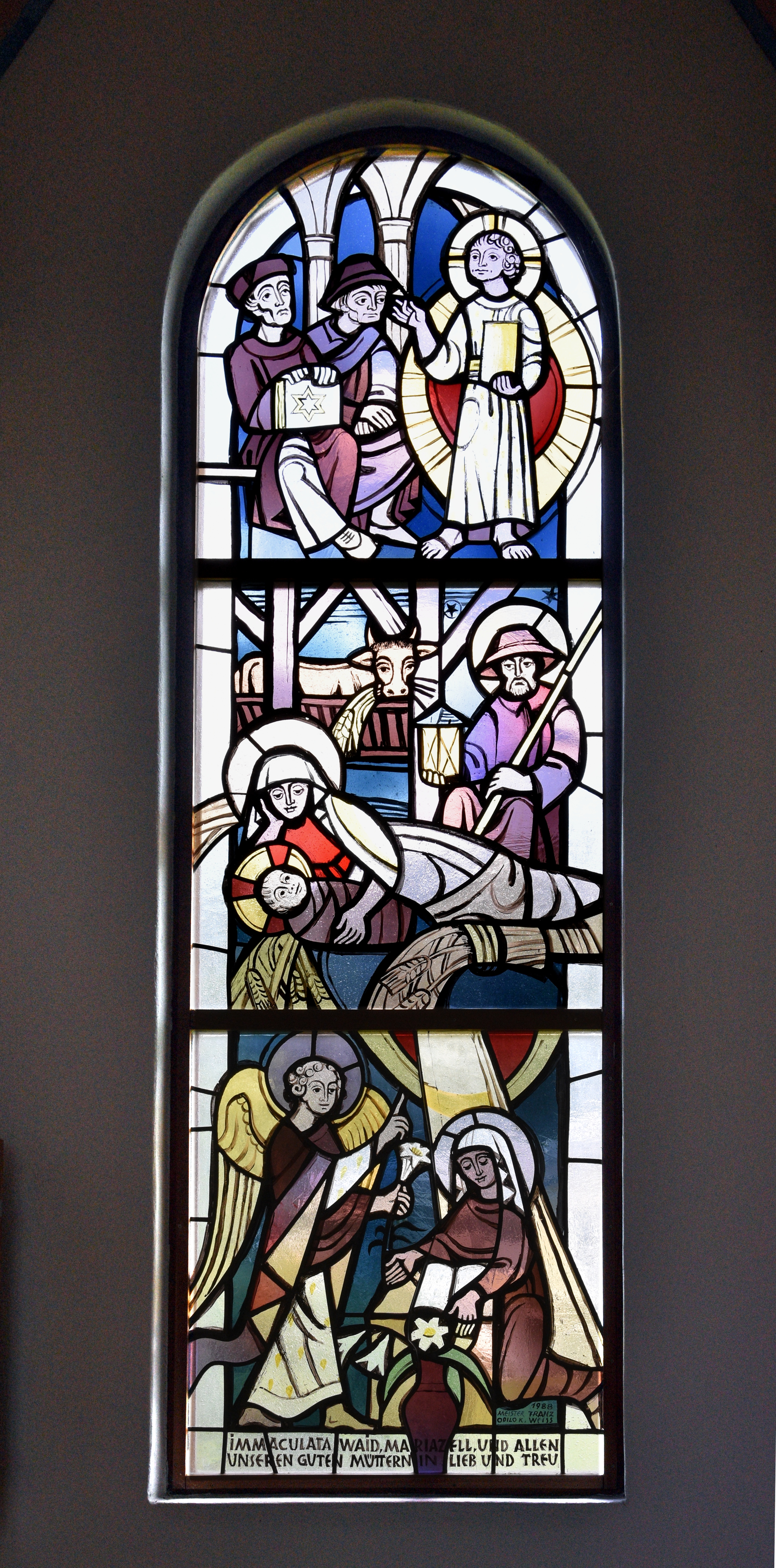
Christmas window:
Jesus in the temple
Birth of Jesus
Annunciation

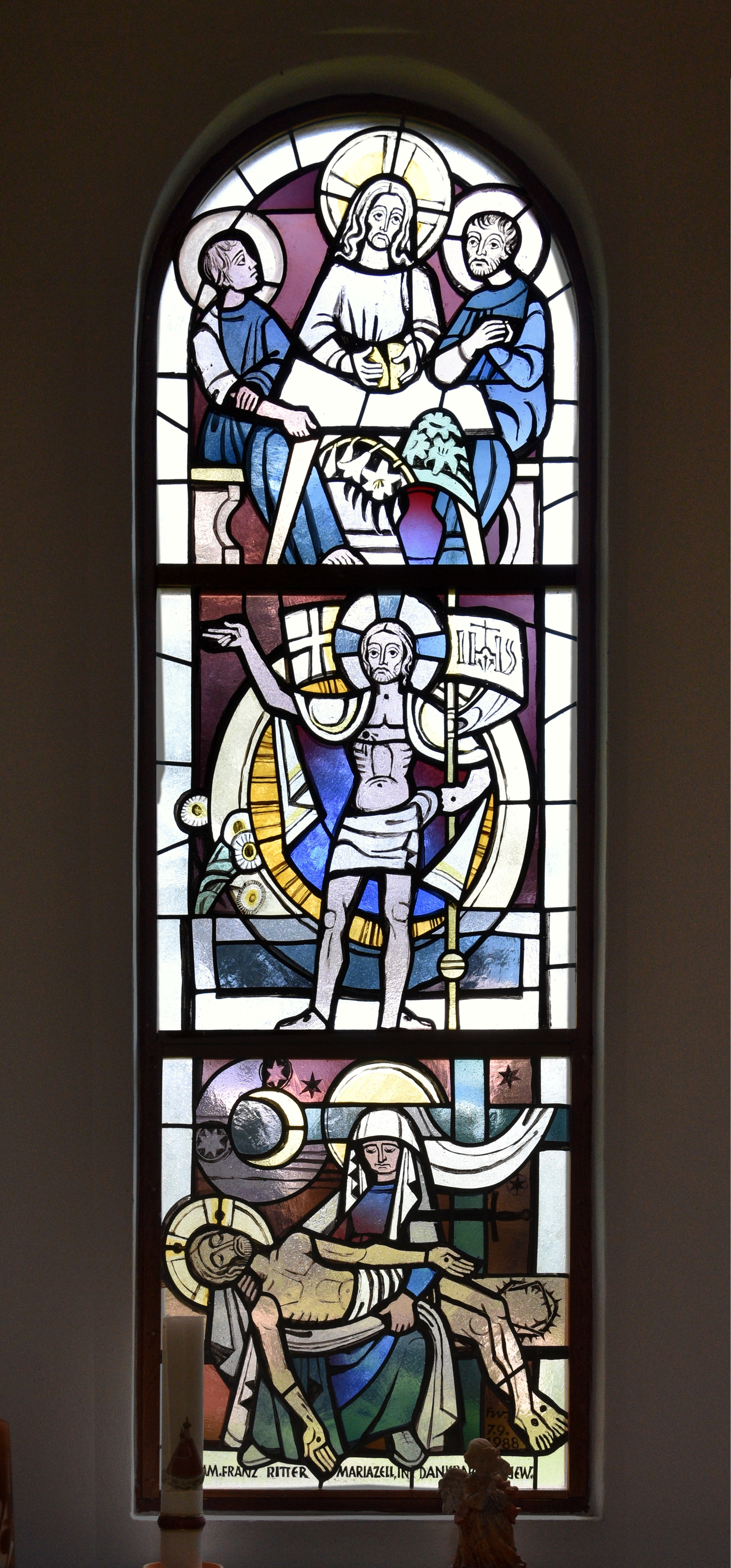
Easter window:
Emmaus
Resurrected
Pietà

Since the colour of the altarpieces began to peel, they were restored by art historian Christina Pucher from 2010 to 2013.

=== Coloured glass windows ===
The two coloured glass windows were made by Master Odilo Kurka in his Schlierbach workshop according to designs by Franz Weiss. The window in the north transept, known as the Christmas window, shows the announcement by the archangel Gabriel to Mary that she will give birth to a son (Luke 1:26–33) at the bottom, the birth of Jesus above and the twelve-year-old Jesus with the scribes in the temple at the top (Luke 2:41). The images of the so-called Easter window in the south transept begin with the Pietà, the mother Mary with her dead son, in the centre the risen Jesus with the banner of victory and above Jesus with the two disciples whom he met on the road to Emmaus after his resurrection and who now recognise him as he breaks bread, just as he did at the Last Supper (Luke 24:13–35).

== Bells ==
Two bells of different sizes hang in the open ridge turret. Both were financed by donations from the public and consecrated on 12 April 1987.

Number	Name	Year of casting	Bell ornamentation
1		1987	Cross emblem and inscription "LORD PROVIDE US THE FAITH"
2	Family peace bell	1987	Emblem of the Mother of Mercy of Mariazell and inscription "GIVE US PEACE MERCIFULLY"

== Church and customs ==
Although the village chapel is located in the municipality of Bärnbach, it belongs to the parish of Voitsberg. The chapel has been under the jurisdiction of this parish since its consecration.

Every year, on the Sunday around the chapel's anniversary, on 15 October, a Holy Mass is celebrated. The chapel is also a place for religious customs. For example, on Holy Saturday it serves as a station for the blessing of Easter food, known locally as the consecration of the flesh. May devotions and harvest celebrations are also held here. At Christmas, the Peace Light is placed here for collection.

Ceiling paintings
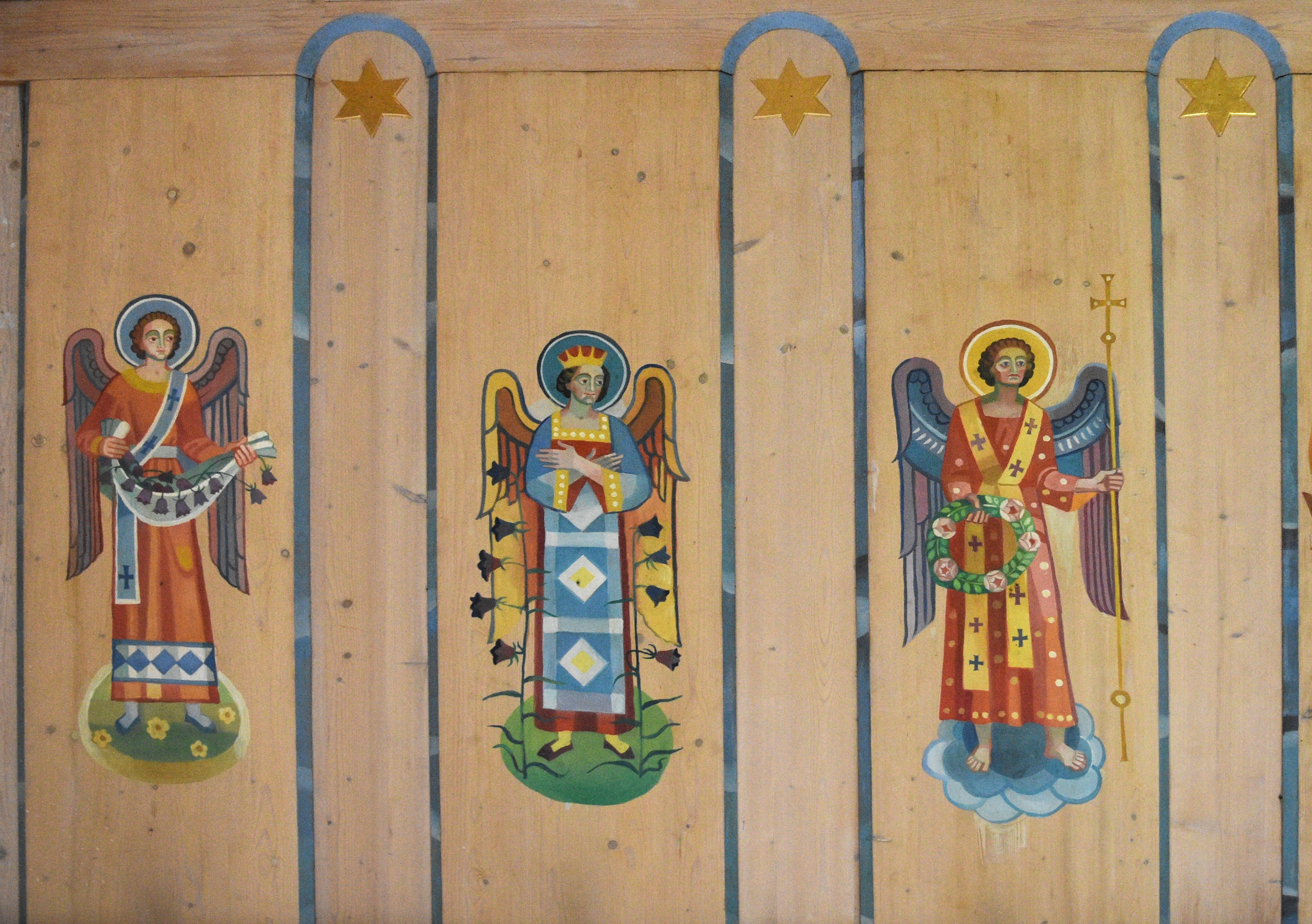
Flower angel, angel of inner prayer and angel of victory

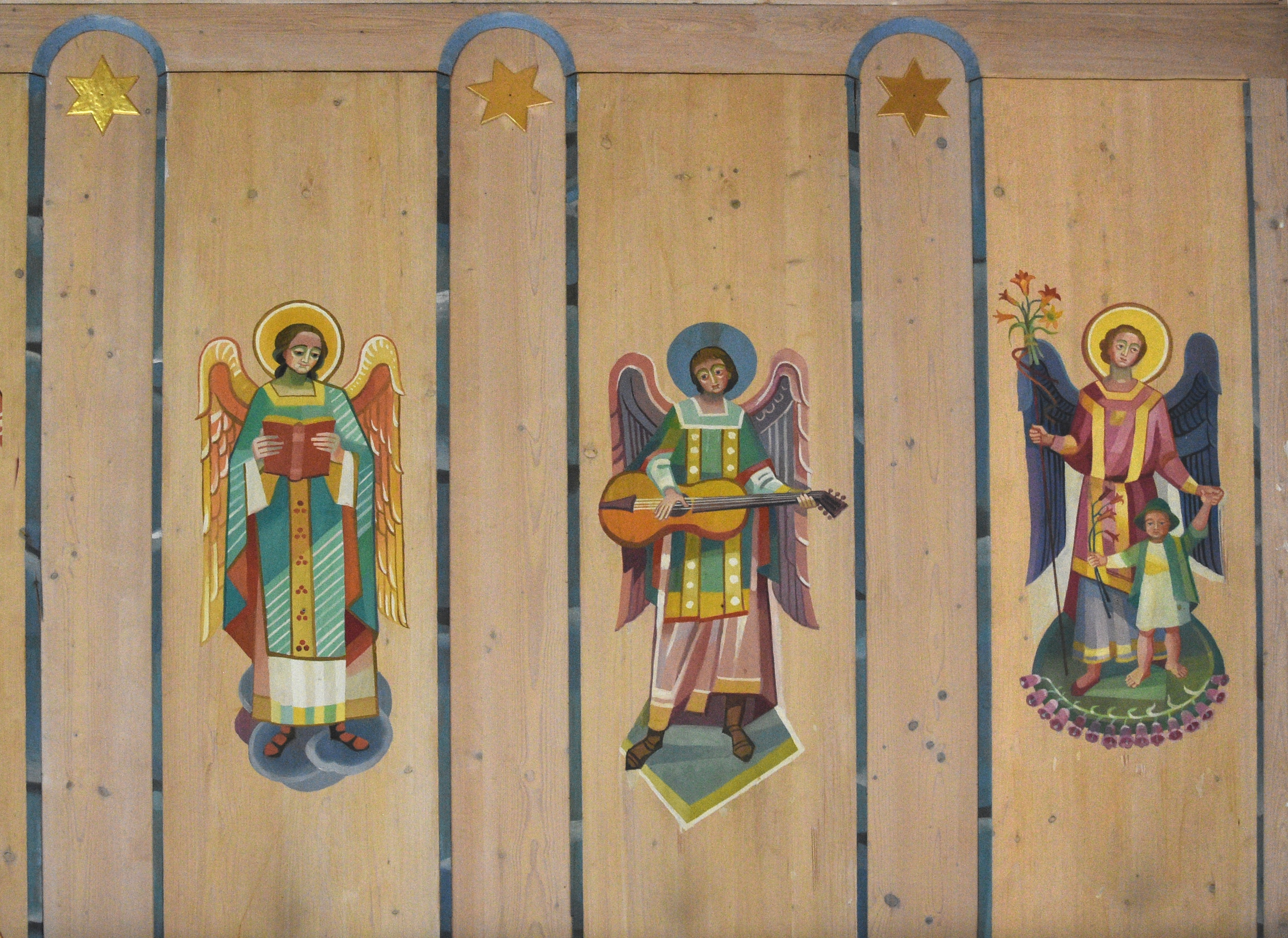
Angel of contemplation, angel of praise and archangel Raphael

== Nativity scenes at the chapel ==
On the occasion of the 750th anniversary of the town of Voitsberg, Franz Weiss created a nativity scene in 1995 and 1996. It consists of six panels which are erected by the chapel every year from the Feast of the Conception (8 December) to Candlemas (2 February). The panels hang in six cottages built by Anton Walter. The scenes on the panels are painted in acrylic. Each scene is surrounded by a frame containing the corresponding biblical verse.

The motifs of the scenes in the Nativity play on regional references. The first panel shows the Annunciation of the Lord (Luke 1:28) by the Archangel Gabriel to Mary, who is kneeling before a lectern. In the background are Saint Michael's Church in Voitsberg, Greißenegg Castle, Voitsberg Parish Church and Voitsberg Steam Power Station. The next scene shows the Annunciation to the shepherds in the field by an angel. This scene also has a regional reference, as the shepherds' sheep are grazing in front of the ruins of Obervoitsberg Castle. The third scene shows the birth of Christ in an open stable. Joseph wears a green jacket and an Alpine hat. In the Adoration of the Magi (Matthew 2:11) on the next panel, Joseph wears a simple Styrian costume. The fifth panel shows the Presentation of the Lord (Luke 2:22) in the Temple of Jerusalem. The temple is depicted as a portico, similar to the crypt in Gurk Cathedral. The flight to Egypt (Matthew 2:14) is the final scene. The Holy Family passes the parish church of Bärnbach, the parish church of Piber and the castle of Alt-Kainach.

Nativity scenes
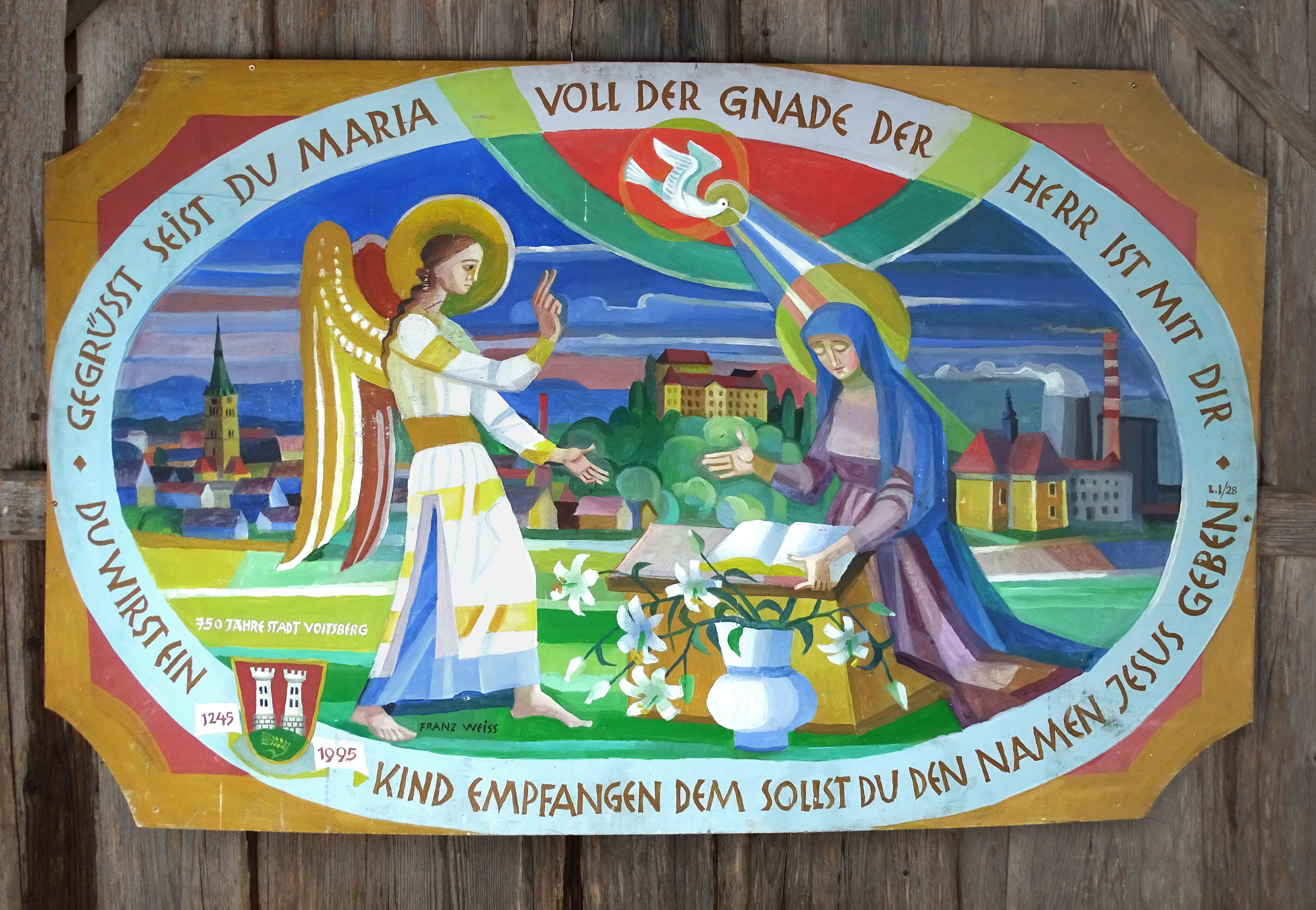
Annunciation by the Angel

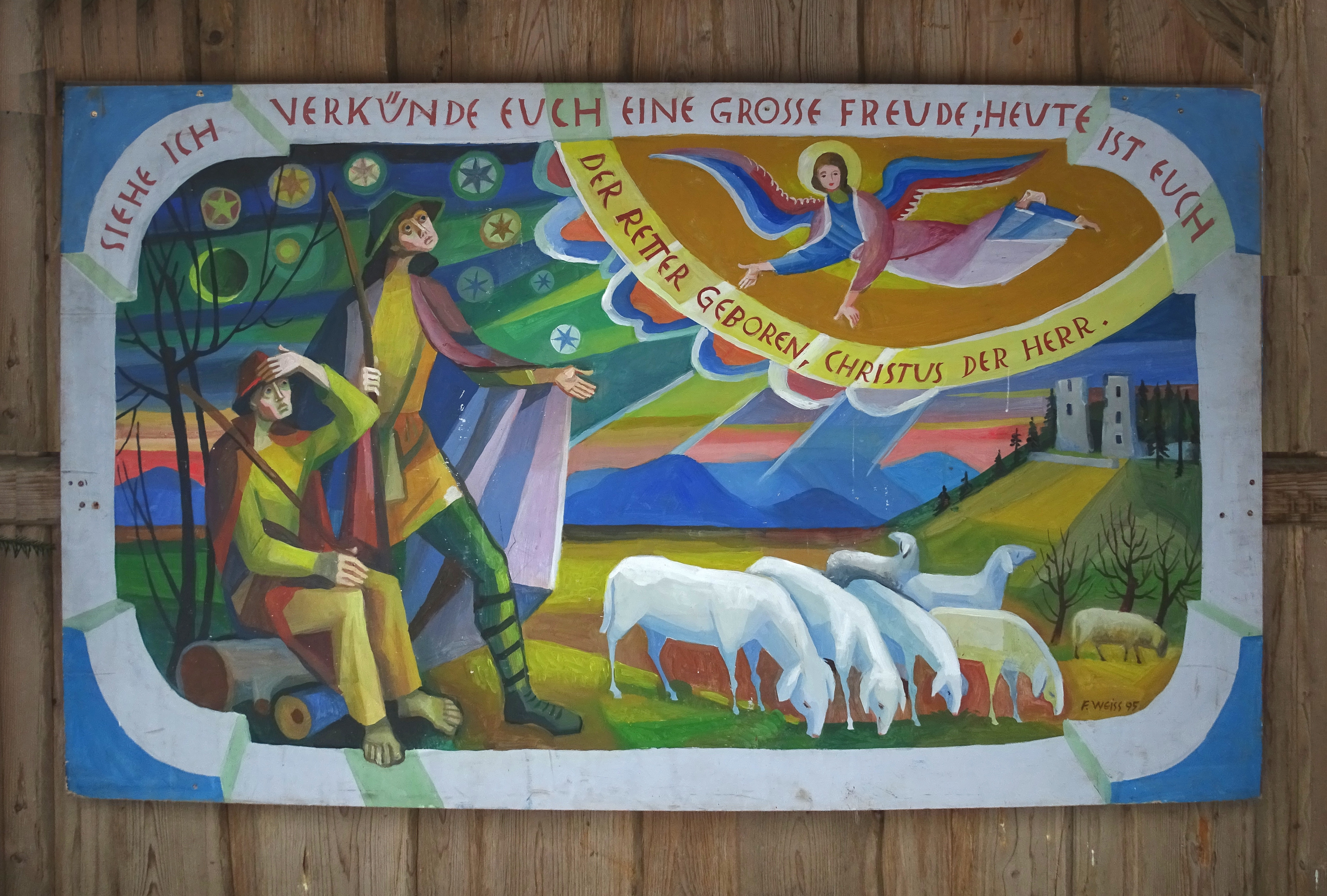
Shepherds in the field

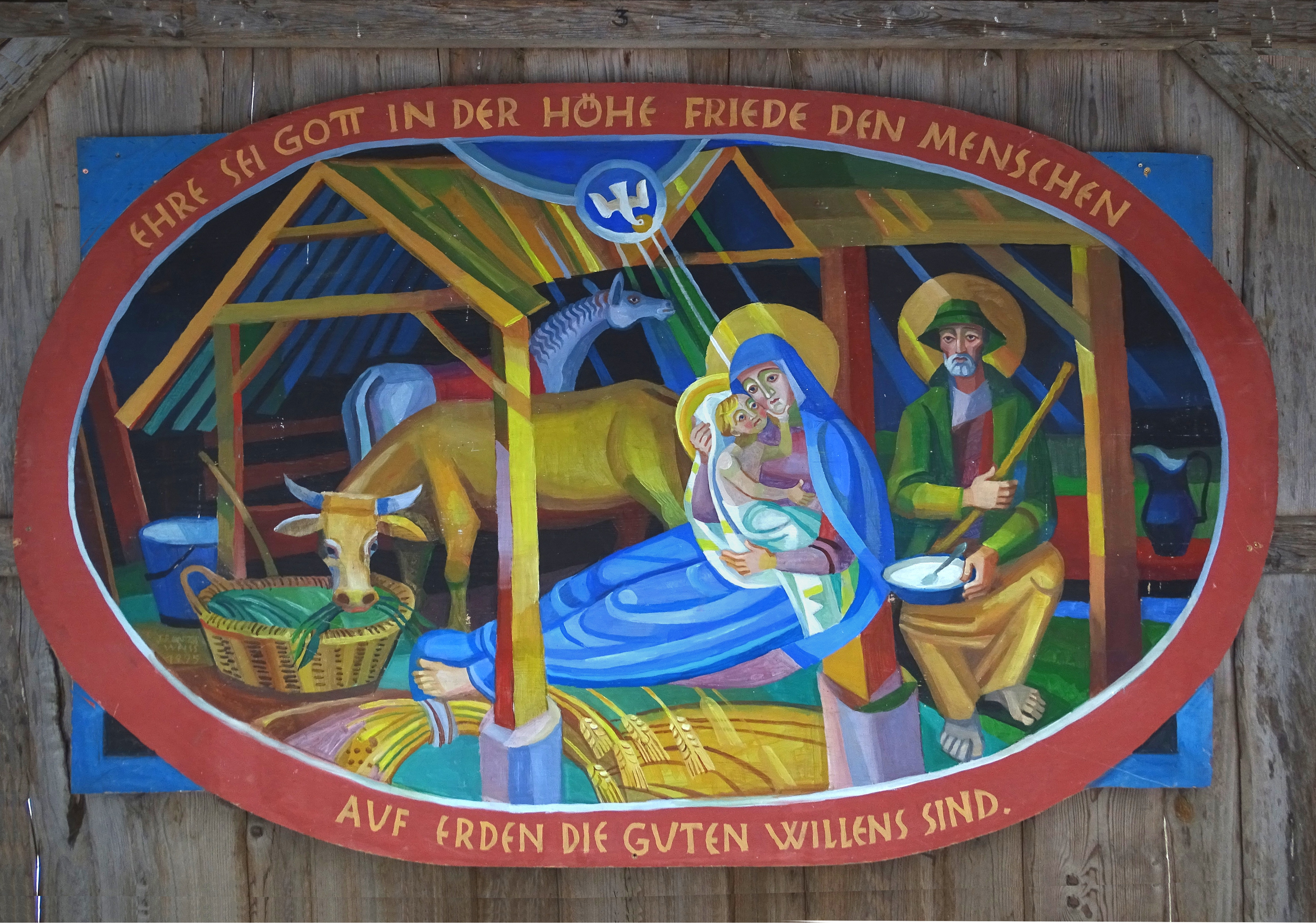
Birth of Christ

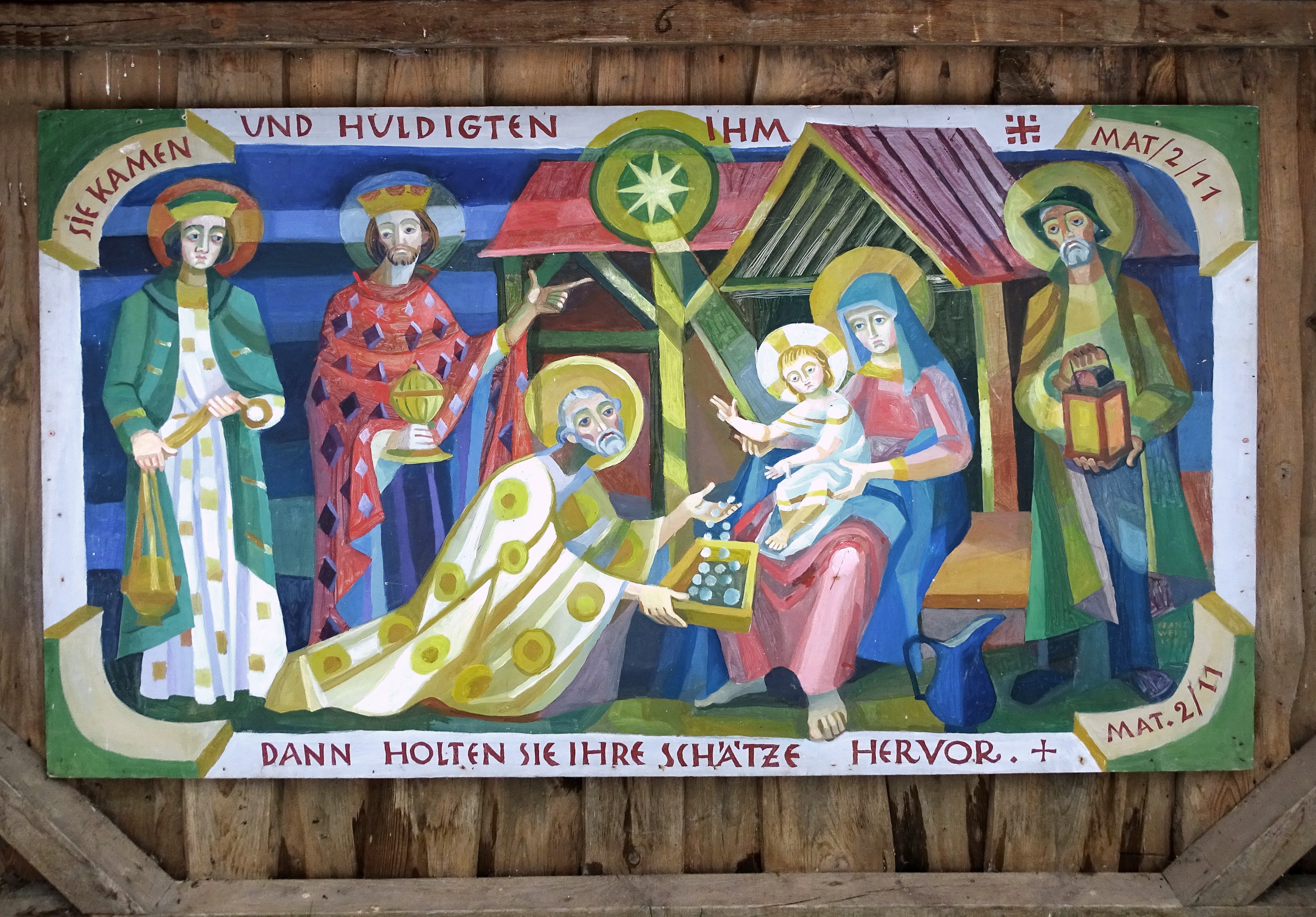
Adoration of the Magi

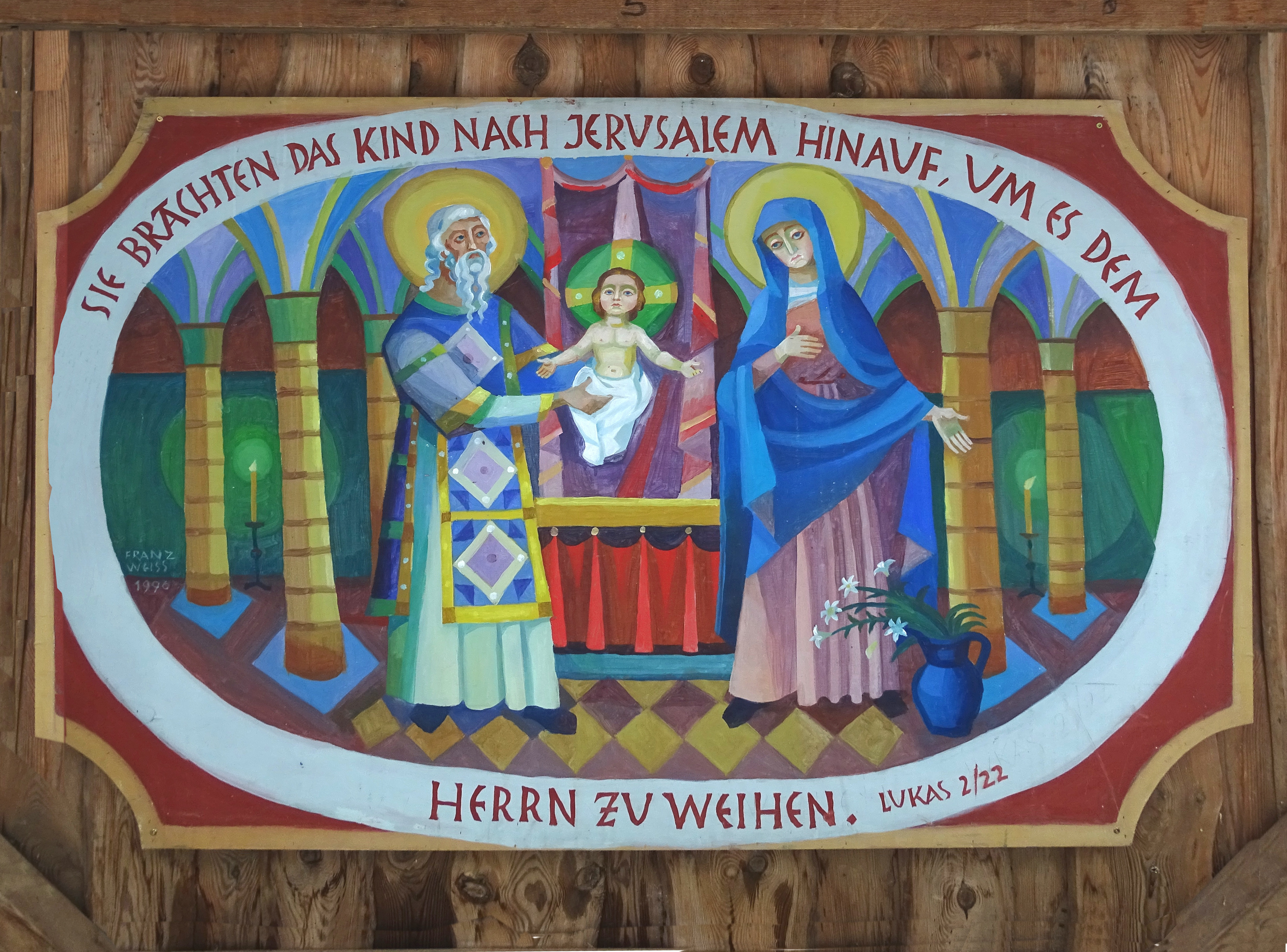
Presentation of Jesus in the temple

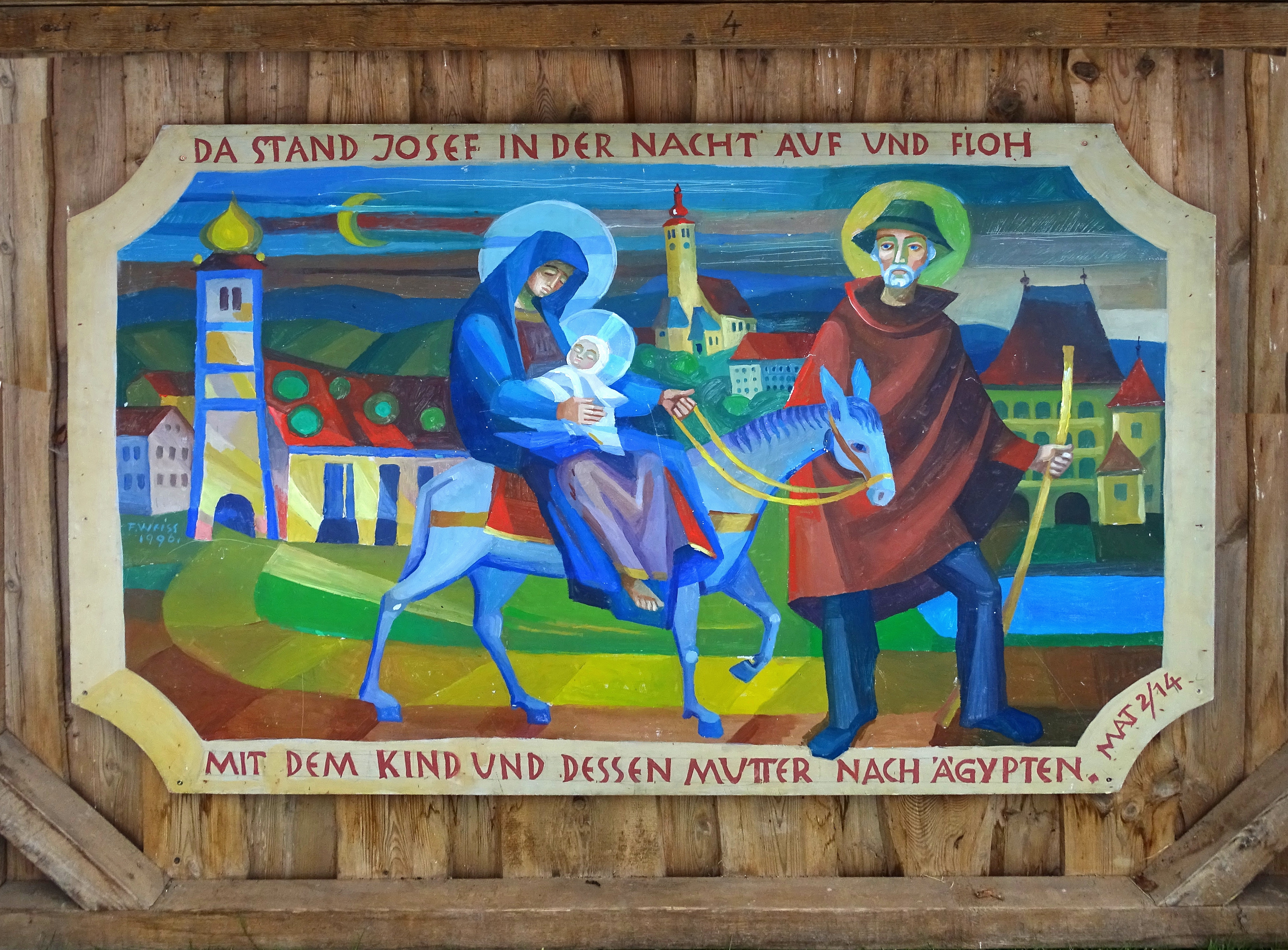
Flight into Egypt
