= Burg Obervoitsberg =

Castle ruin in Austria

Coordinates: 47.048°N 15.146°E

- Styria, Austria
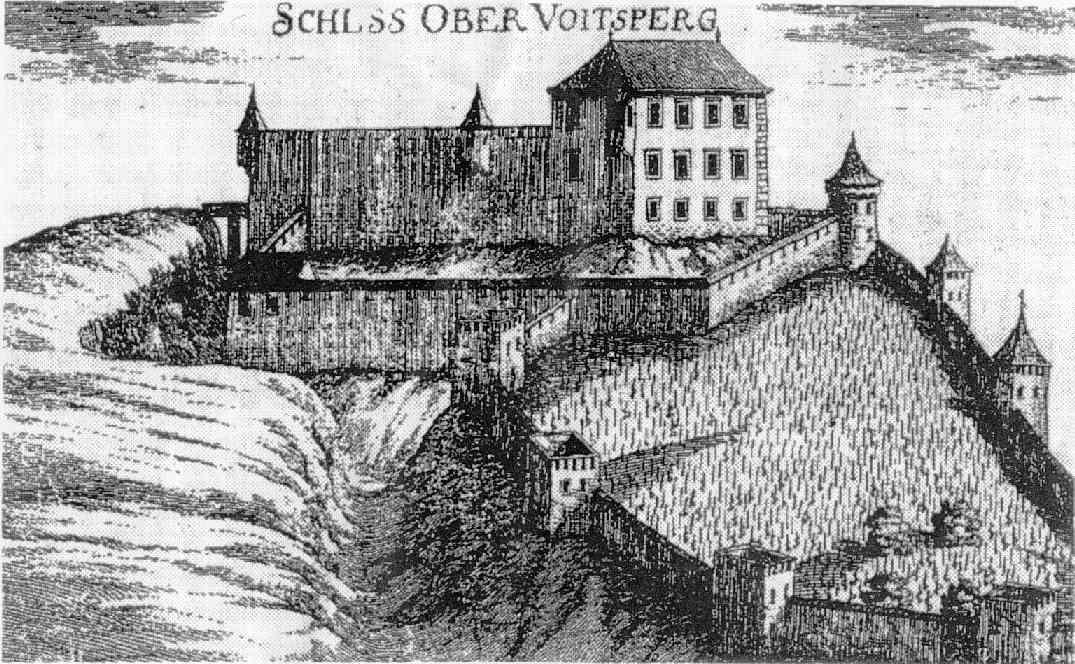

Site information
- Type: Hilltop castle

Site history
- Built: 1164
- Built by: Ottokar IV, Duke of Styria

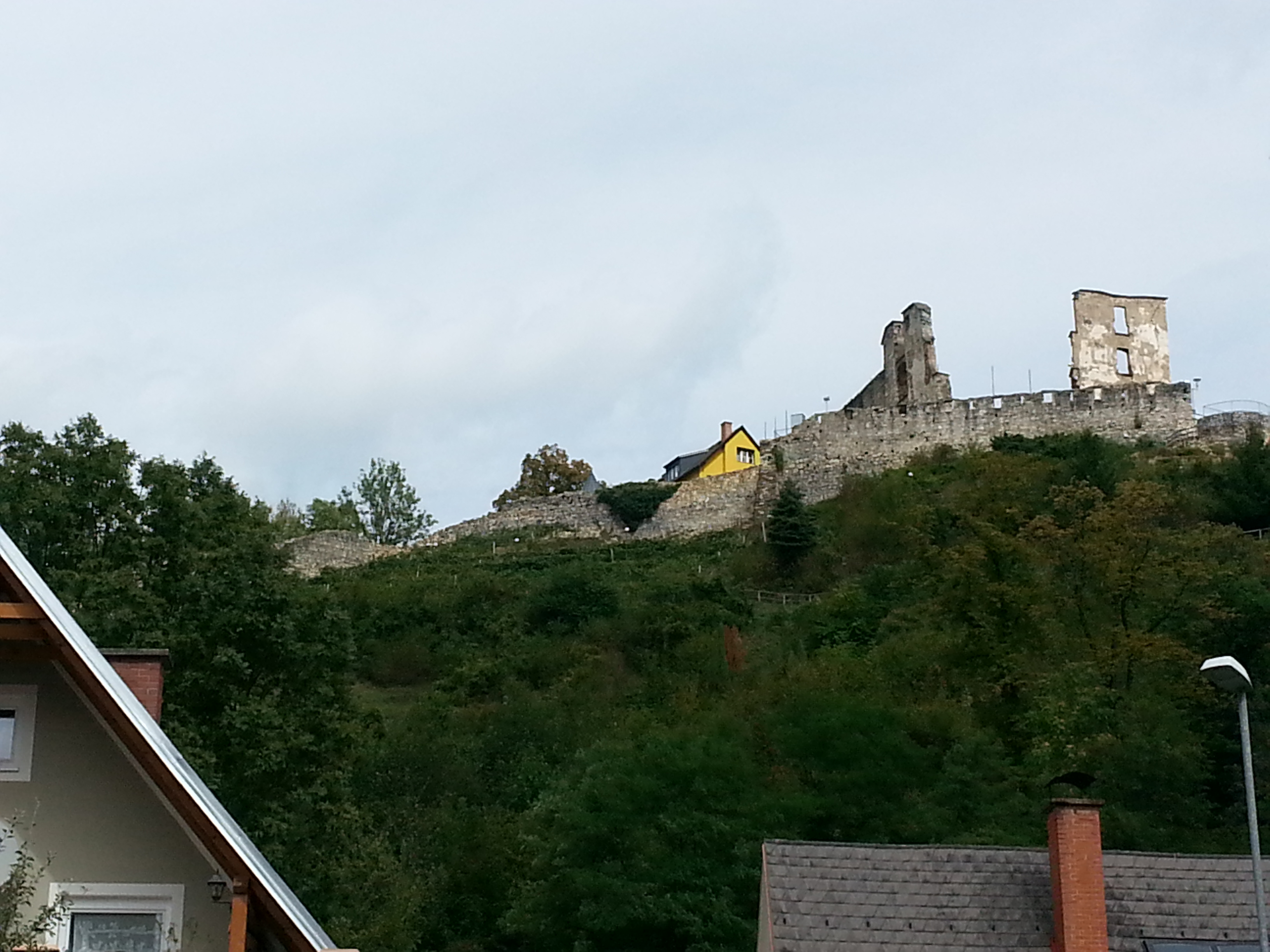
Burgruine Obervoitsberg

Burg Obervoitsberg is a castle in Voitsberg, Styria, Austria.

The ruins can be reached from the city center via a walking trail that runs along the former eastern city wall.

== See also ==
- List of castles in Austria
