= Graz International Bilingual School =

Graz International Bilingual School (GIBS)

Location
- Georgiegasse 85a, 8020, Graz; Graz, Styria 8020; Austria; 47°04′31″N 15°23′43″E

Information
- Former names: Bundesgymnasium Marschallgasse
- School type: University Preparatory Charter International Bilingual School
- Religious affiliation: Nonsectarian with optional religious courses
- Established: 1991
- Administrator: Heinz Knasar, Florian Lassnig
- Principal: Edda Berger-Cian
- Faculty: 60
- Grades: 5-12
- Enrollment: 500+
- Classes: 24
- Average class size: ~25
- Student to teacher ratio: ~9:1
- Campus: Eggenberg
- Colours: Red & Royal Blue
- Website: www.gibs.at

The Graz International Bilingual School (GIBS) is an Austrian bilingual (English/German) university preparatory semi-independent charter school in Graz, Austria. It is a grammar school. The school mainly focuses on languages, offering German, English, Russian, Latin, French and Spanish. Students graduate with the Austrian Matura, the IB Diploma or with both, assuming that they meet the criteria necessary.

In grade 5, or the students' first year, students are required to take both German and English. In grade 8, the students must choose between French and Spanish. They must choose between Spanish, French, Latin or Russian in grade 10. The same language cannot be chosen twice (e.g. Spanish in both grade 8 and 10). Most students graduate from GIBS with a total of 4 languages.

== School profile ==
GIBS is a bilingual (German-English) university preparatory charter school. At present the school comprises more than 500 students and 60 teaching staff. The rest of the team is made up of language assistants, trainee teachers and other administrative staff.

The language of instruction is English in the form of "flexible monolingualism". The first three months of Year 1 take the form of an intensive phase of language acquisition after which the students have reached a level of language competence which enables them to participate in lessons conducted in the target language. Following the intensive phase, linguistic back-up for other subjects is provided when required in the English class. In Year 7 History can optionally be taught in French. During the first five school years in particular, different subjects collaborate on broad projects that supplement language instruction. Between Year 6 and Year 8, the upper-level course system ensures the interconnection and deepening of learning material, and also allows the students to dive deeper into their interests that they wish to pursue in their later professional life. Students from non-German speaking countries are taught German as a foreign language. The school encourages foreign students to learn German through programs such as Deutsch als Fremdsprache (DAF, German as a second language). Their evaluation is in accordance to §18/12 of the School Instruction Guidelines which allows students to select either German or English as their first language of instruction and be thereby assessed accordingly.

The school has a reputation for academic excellence and a strong participation in national awards and organizations. Upon graduation, the majority of students enroll in a 4-year degree program. GIBS graduates have attended Harvard College, Imperial College London, Cornell University, King's College London, London School of Economics, Oxford University, Maastricht University, ETH Zürich and the University of St. Gallen, among others.

The level of education is similar to the normal equivalent of the Austrian school system, but allows room for further study in the individual's field of interest through the upper school course system and the optional International Baccalaureate Diploma Program. Language proficiency in at least one foreign language is a graduation requirement, and three foreign languages (English, French, Spanish, Russian, Latin, or German as a Foreign Language) must be taken for 8 (English or German), 6 (French or Spanish) or 4 (Latin or Russian) years respectively.

== Campus ==
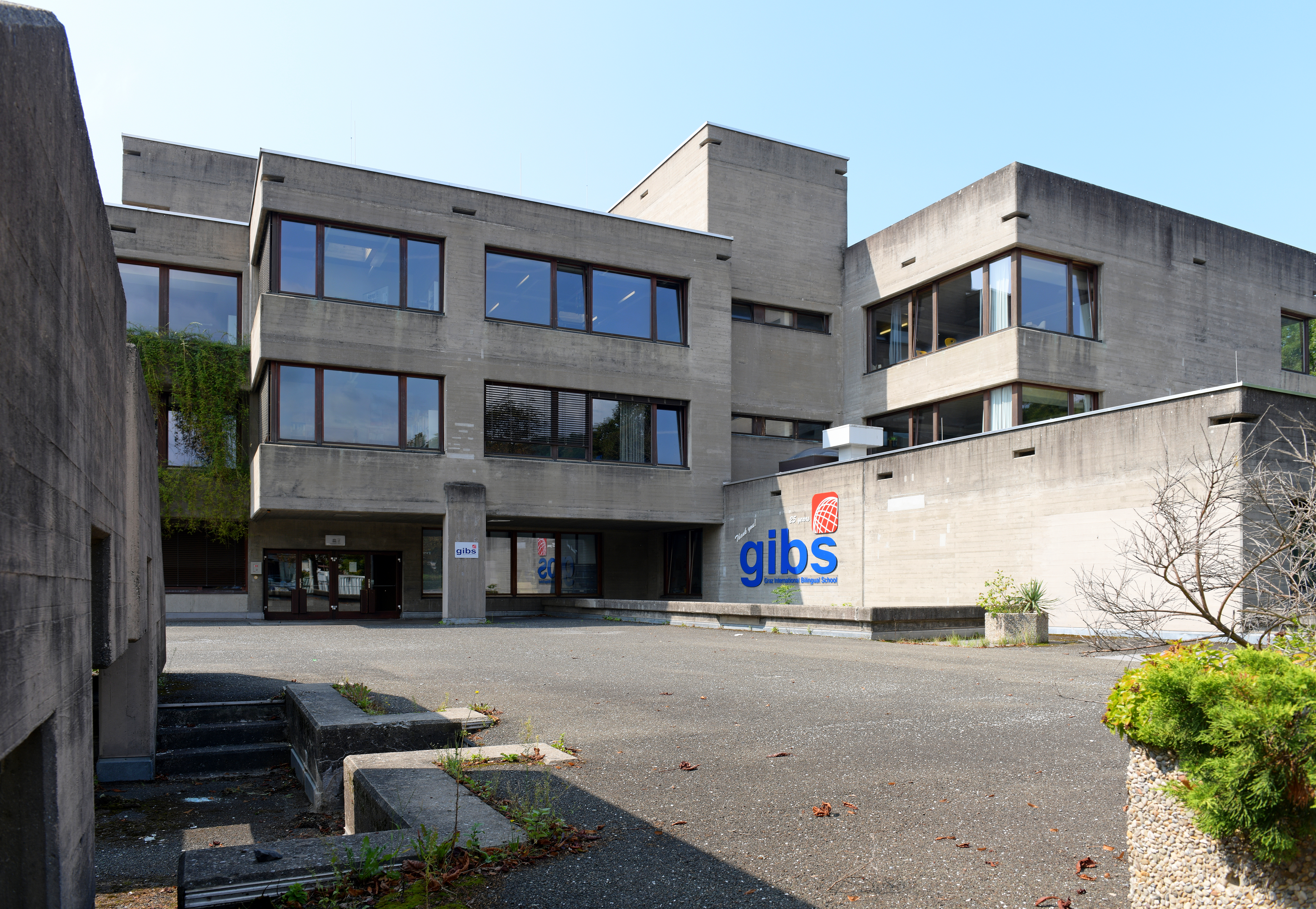
View of the campus

The school campus is located in the North Western part of Graz in Eggenberg, neighbouring the historic palace Schloss Eggenberg and the private school of the Grazer Schulschwestern. The main building to which the school relocated in 2010 was built in 1964 after the designs of Günther Domenig and Eilfried Huth. In 1967 the building was granted the Österreichischer Bauherrenpreis by the Central Association of Architects in Austria. This building houses, among others, the biology lab, three computer science labs, the library, the gym and changing rooms, music and art rooms, practise rooms, the administration and conference rooms, and most classrooms. Furthermore, the Northern Wing offers after-school facilities and the cafeteria for those participating in ACE, additionally to the main office and storage rooms. Study corners can be found throughout the school. The underground parking garage is directly accessible from the main building.

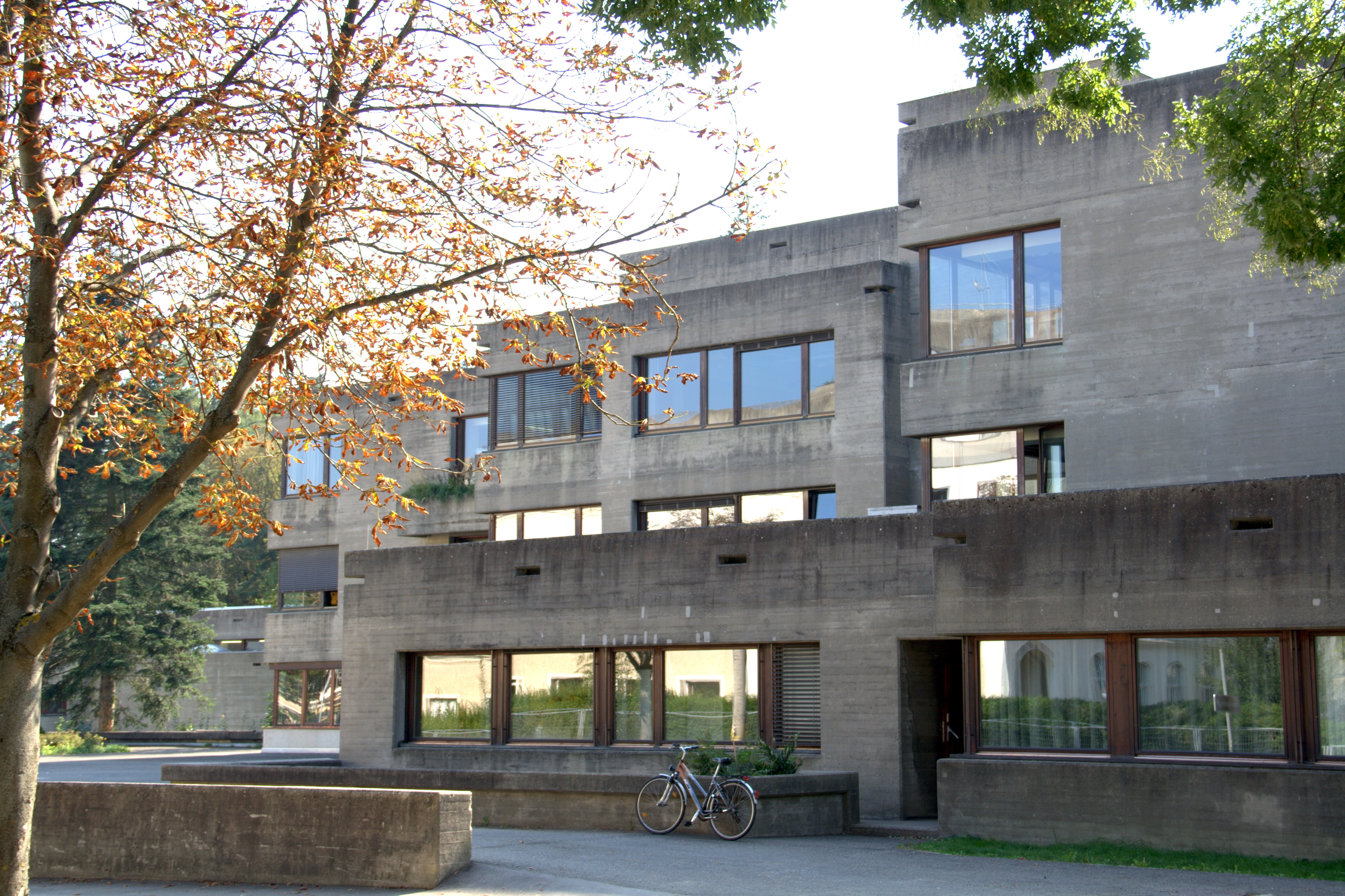
View from the back, standing on Georgiegasse

The new wing, built in 2010, is home to the classrooms of the graduating class, the chemistry and physics labs and the visual arts room.

== Sport facilities ==
The school building houses a large in-door gym in which the students can partake in various forms of physical activity. Additionally to the school gym, the neighboring ASKÖ sport center and Auster Bad provide gyms, volleyball courts, tennis courts, basketball courts, football and baseball fields, running tracks and indoor/outdoor swimming pools, which are used regularly by the students for school and extracurricular activities.

Once a year, the students may participate in the Antenne-Schulskitag, a skiing trip organized by the radio network Antenne Steiermark. Apart from this, lower grades also go to a multiple day long ski-trip excursion in a nearby ski resort.

== Admissions ==
GIBS is, in theory, a public state school but there are entrance limitations. These are largely a result of the number of applicants that apply because of the very prestigious reputation of the school. In the past few years, GIBS has been getting nearly four times as many applications from new students than it can accept.

In order to be accepted to GIBS a student's elementary school report card must consist mainly of "Sehr Gut" or "A" grades (90% or over in all classes), and the student must complete an entrance test and interview together with other applying students. Students with a bilingual background will be given higher priority, and have to complete an individual interview.

== Academic systems ==
=== Course system ===
==== Introduction ====
The school offers a Course System for Years 6–8. While upholding the principle of an all-round education fundamental to the Austrian school system, the course system allows students more freedom to pursue their particular interests and in-depth study. Students can select courses which are useful for their proposed academic and professional careers. Gibs - Graz International Bilingual School - School Profile

In order to qualify for the final exam (Reifeprüfung), students need to gather a minimum amount of credits. The minimum amount of credits required for qualification is 68. The 68 credits must include a certain amount of credits in the following categories:

- 16 language credits (German, English, French, Spanish, Latin)
- 12 science credits (Biology, Chemistry, Physics, Mathematics)
- 12 humanities and geography credits (History, Geography, Psychology and Philosophy)

The school offers various courses, for each weekly attended period the student is rewarded with 2 credits.

==== Subject pools ====
The students can choose courses from the following subject pools:

===== Pool 1 - Languages =====
- English
- German
- French
- Spanish
- Latin
- Russian

===== Pool 2 - Sciences =====
- Biology
- Chemistry
- Physics
- Mathematics

===== Pool 3 - Humanities =====
- History, Politics and Social Studies
- Geography and Economics
- Psychology
- Philosophy

===== Pool 4 - Other =====
- Religious Education (separated into catholic and Protestant)
- Music
- Arts
- Computing
- Descriptive Geometry
- Physical Education

=== International Baccalaureate ===
==== Introduction ====
In 2017, GIBS became an IB Diploma Program (IBDP) school. The IBDP is an international academic program aimed at students aged 15–19. The introduction of the IBDP at the school made it possible for students to attain two different certificates: the Austrian Matura (Standardisierte Reifeprüfung) and the IB diploma.

Primarily, the IB was introduced to allow foreign students that would not otherwise be able to graduate from GIBS (due to not being qualified for the Standardisierte Reifeprüfung) to successfully graduate.

==== Subjects ====
GIBS currently offers the following courses from which students can choose one from each group (alternatively, group 6 may be dropped and a subject from another group may be chosen instead):

===== Group 1: Language A =====
- German A Language and Literature (HL&SL)
- English A Language and Literature (HL&SL)

===== Group 2: Language B =====
- German B (SL)
- English B (HL)
- German Ab. Initio
- French B (HL)
- Spanish B (HL)

===== Group 3: Individuals and Societies =====
- Psychology (HL&SL)
- Economics (HL&SL)
- History (HL&SL)

===== Group 4: Experimental Sciences =====
- Physics (SL)
- Biology (HL&SL)
- Chemistry (HL&SL)

===== Group 5: Mathematics =====
- Mathematics Analysis and Approaches (SL)

===== Group 6: The arts and Electives =====
- Visual arts (HL&SL
  - alternatively another subject from groups 1, 2, 3 or 4 may be chosen by the candidate.

HL: higher level; SL: standard level

===== Other Core Requirements =====
Students are also required by the IB to take and complete the following core requirements to pass:

- Theory of knowledge (TOK)
- Creativity, Activity, Service (CAS)
- Extended Essay (EE)
- Various Internal Assessments across various subjects (IAs)

==== Passing Requirements ====
Per subject, a student can achieve a maximum of 7 points. To receive the diploma, a student needs to achieve a minimum of 24 points (45 are possible) and meet the core requirements outlined above.

A student completing the IBDP must take 3 higher level subjects and 3 standard level subjects.

== Student, parent and teacher Involvement ==
The school encourages strong student and parent involvement, whether this be concerning outings or schoolwork. Alongside the class representatives (two per class, e.g. 4 or 6 per grade), which are elected for a yearly term and deal with issues directly in the student body, the SGA (Schulgemeinschaftsausschuss) is the main decision-making body of the school. It is composed of the principal or administrator as a chairperson (depending on availability and does not have a vote), three parent representatives, three staff representatives, and the three student-body presidents. All are elected at the beginning of the year by the respective groups. A majority vote of two votes per party is needed for any decision to be passed. Furthermore, the Parent-Teacher-Association is involved in many issues concerning the school from school funding to course decisions and social events.

On a social level, the PTA and the student-body organize frequent social events during the year. The Graduation Ball that is organized by the graduating class is held in high regard throughout the city, often having more than 3,000 visitors. Other events include the annual Jazzbrunch, the Talent Show, the Graduation Awards Ceremony, the Halloween and Carnival Parties, the Christmas Performance and frequent Drama Club performances.

== Extracurricular qualifications ==
DELE - Diplomas de Español como Lengua Extranjera
DELF - Diplôme d`études de langue français
EBCL - European Business Competence Licence
ECDL - European Computer Driving Licence
IELTS – International English Language Testing System

== Awards ==
Pädagogischer Panther 2000
Europäisches Siegel für innovativen Sprachunterricht 2000
AK Schulpreis 2003/2004 für Kurssystem
Euroscola Strasbourg 2004, 2007, 2009, 2010, 2020
European Youth Parliament 2004, 2008, 2009, 2010, 2011
School Award 2004 "Auf den Spuren des steirischen Panthers" von Roland Berger, 2009 Eurolingua, 3xGold, 3xSilber, 2xBronze, 2010 Eurolingua 2011

Schulhomepage Award 2007
UNESCO ASPnet School since 2007
SPIN Seal of Excellence 2006
Ranked best School in Austria in the Oesterreich Schulwahl 2006

== Other ==
ACE- After School Care & Education
DaF/DaZ- German as a Foreign Language (Beginners, Intermediate and Advanced)
Choir
English Drama
European Youth Parliament
Prix des lycéens autrichiens
Eurolingua
