= Eilfried Huth =

Austrian architect (born 1930)

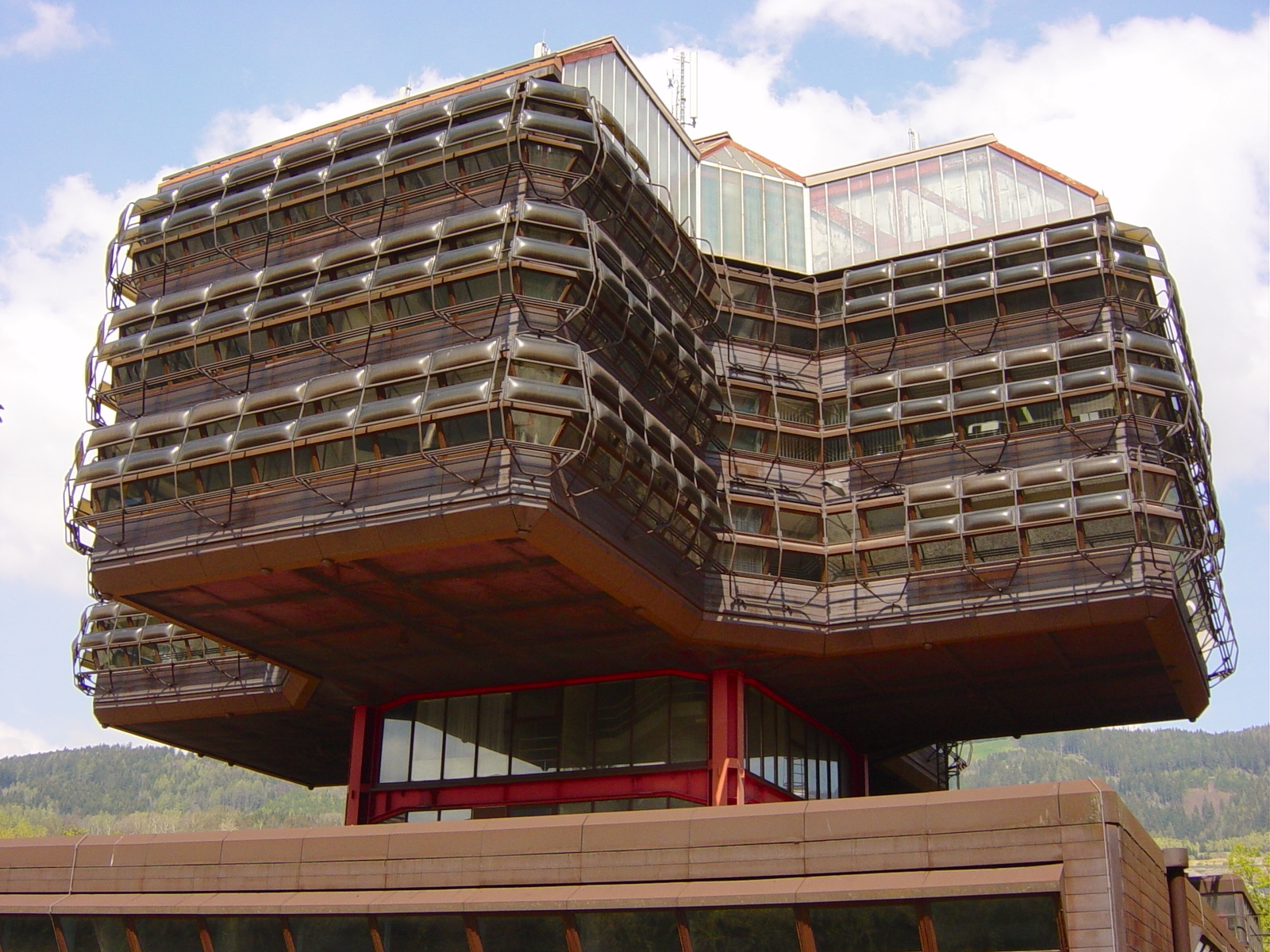
Research and Computing Center (FRZ) of the VÖEST Alpine Montangesellschaft in Leoben (1968–1973)

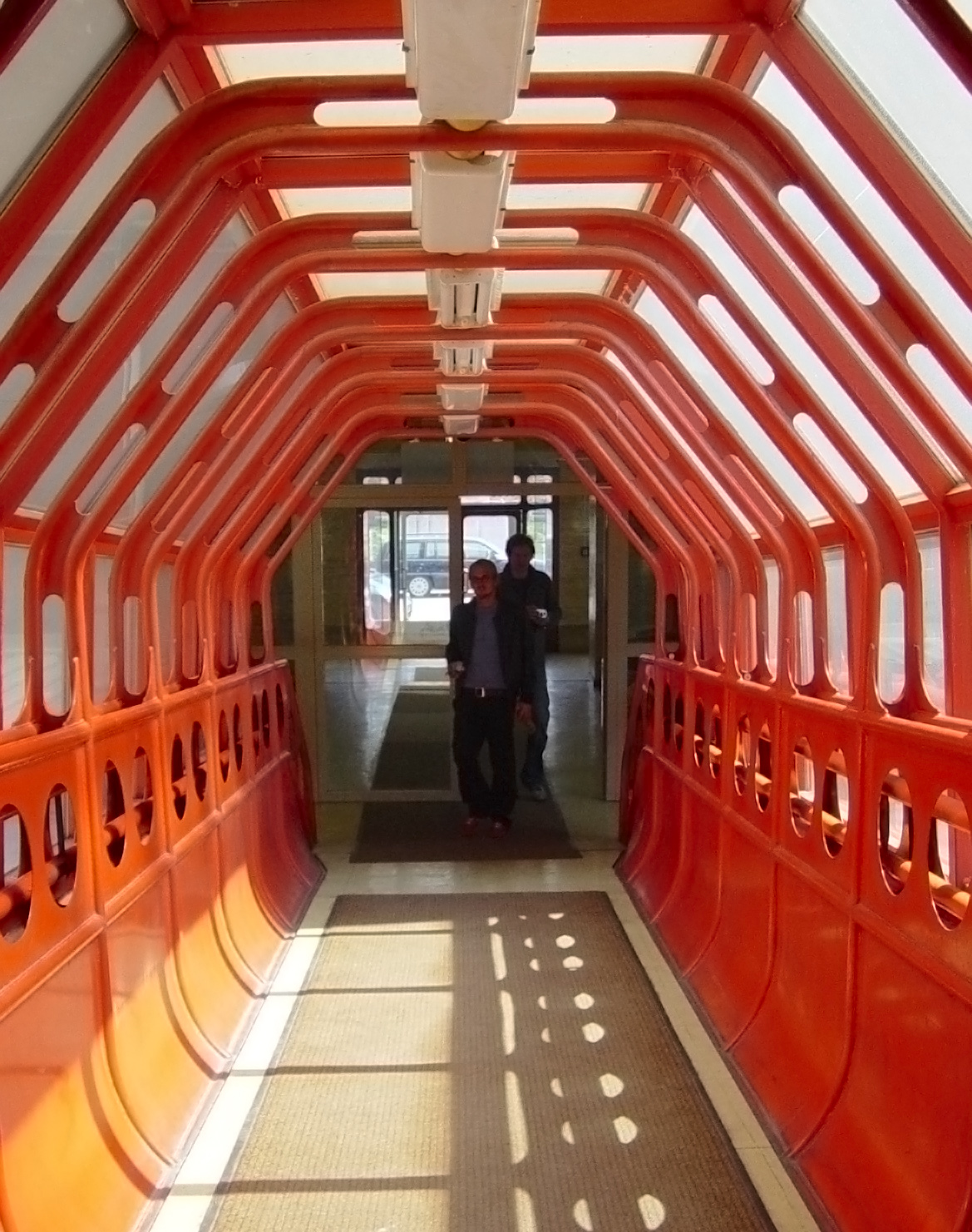
Interior corridor of the Research and Computing Center (FRZ)

Eilfried Huth (born 1 December 1930) is an Austrian architect who lives and works in Graz. Huth is best known for participatory housing projects, in which future residents of the housing estates are included in the planning process.

== Life and education ==
Huth was born in Pangalengan, Indonesia. For three years, Huth attended the National Political Institutes of Education, which was housed in the monastery of Sankt Paul im Lavanttal. He studied at Graz University of Technology from 1950 to 1956. After graduating from the university, he worked for the architect Emmerich Donau until 1962. From 1962 to 1975, Huth and Günther Domenig worked together as a team, with offices in Graz and Munich. From 1971 to 1972, Huth was visiting professor at University of Kassel. From 1985 to 2005, he was Professor at the Berlin University of the Arts.

== Architectural career ==
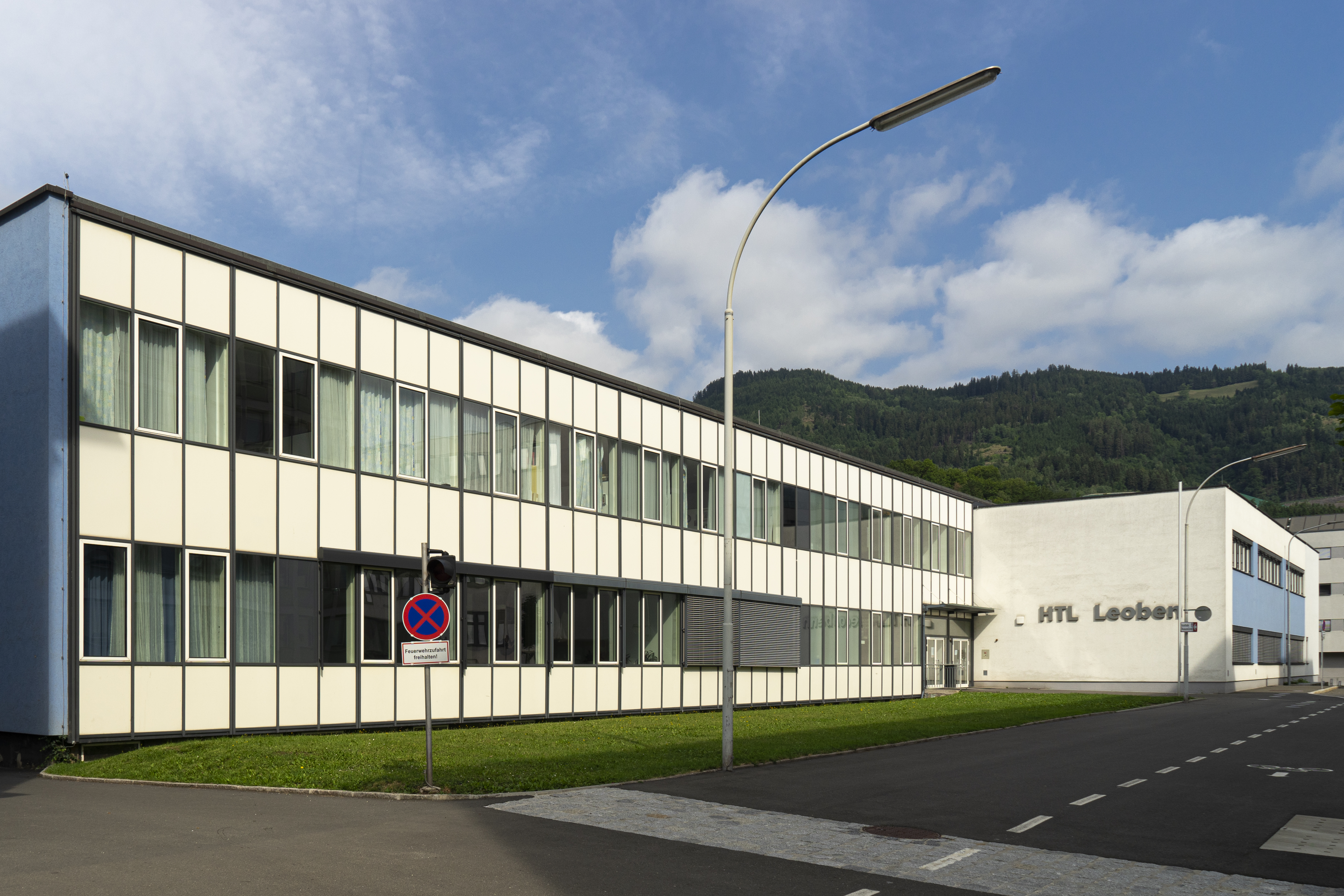
School in Leoben (1957–1960), Huth designed as an employee of architect Emmerich Donau

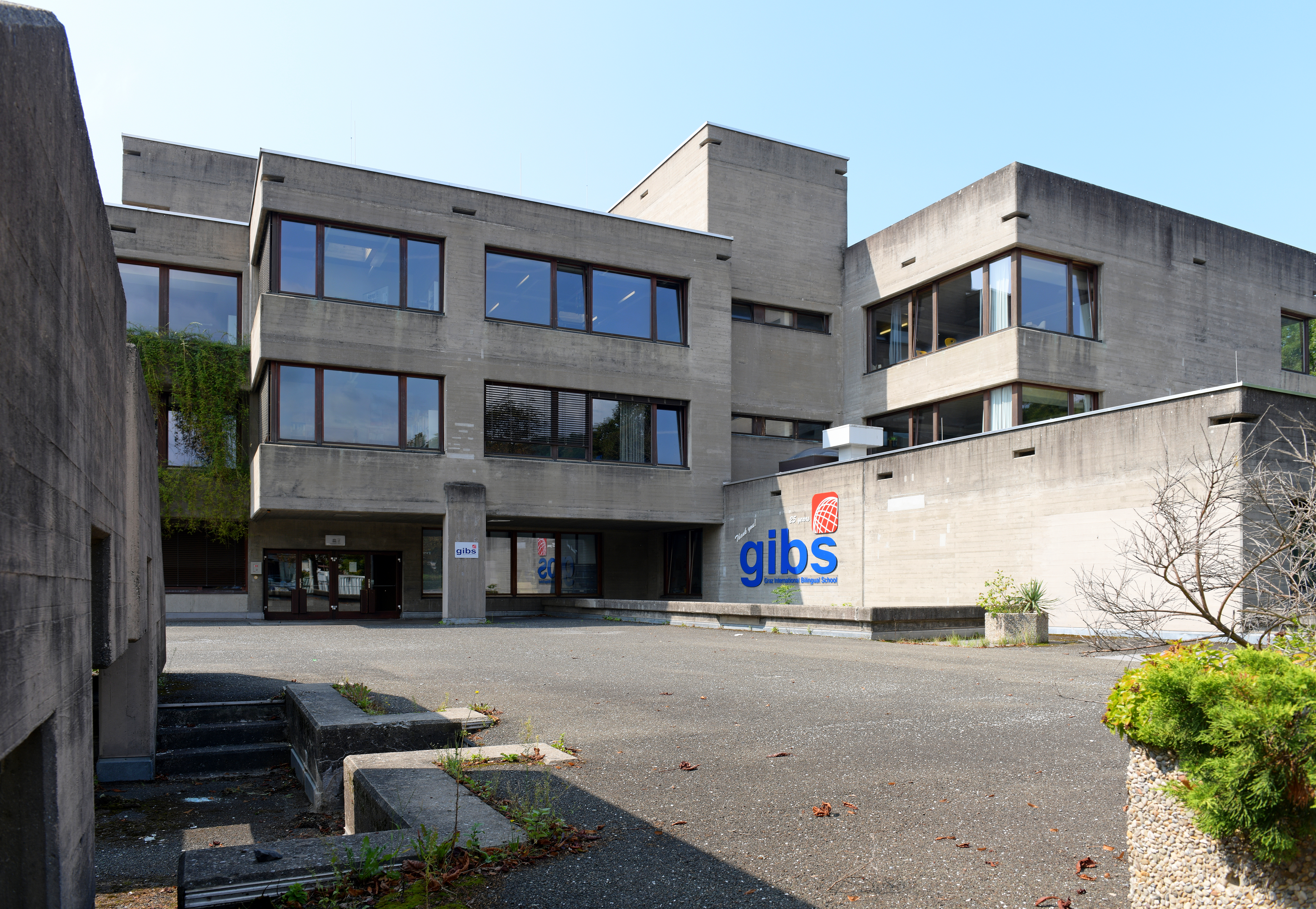
Pedagogical Academy Graz (1964–1967), designed with Günther Domenig

The first buildings by Huth are typical functionalism of the late 1950s. The respective clients for the school building in Leoben (1956–1958) and the high-rise office building in Zeltweg (1957–1960) came from the mining sector. Until 1968, Huth continued planning further buildings in Leoben and Zeltweg, specializing in steel construction. After a phase of modernist functionalism, Huth turned to structuralism and brutalism. Together with Günther Domenig, he designed buildings with exposed concrete which are among the outstanding examples of brutalism in Austria. Both the Pedagogical Academy Graz and the Oberwart Parish Church were commissioned by the Catholic Church. The Research and Computing Center (FRZ) of the VÖEST Alpine Montangesellschaft in Leoben is considered structuralist architecture. Huth designed the outer shell of the building with weathering steel, a façade material that was new at the time. A much-noticed design from this phase is the visionary and unbuildable Stadt Ragnitz project, in which Huth and Domenig designed a theoretical megastructure similar to projects conceptualized by the Metabolists or Archigram.

At the beginning of the 1970s, Huth and Domenig increasingly designed pop-art-architecture. Their temporary buildings for the 1972 Summer Olympics in Munich were colorful and had rounded corners and playful geometries typical of pop art. Their design for a multi-purpose hall at the Institute of the Sisters of St. Francis in Graz-Eggenberg is reminiscent of a tortoise shell and thus characterized as organic architecture. The style of Huth and Domenig combines aspects of all of the aforementioned architectural trends: structuralism, brutalism, metabolism, pop art, and organic architecture. Today, this type of architecture is also known as the Graz School.

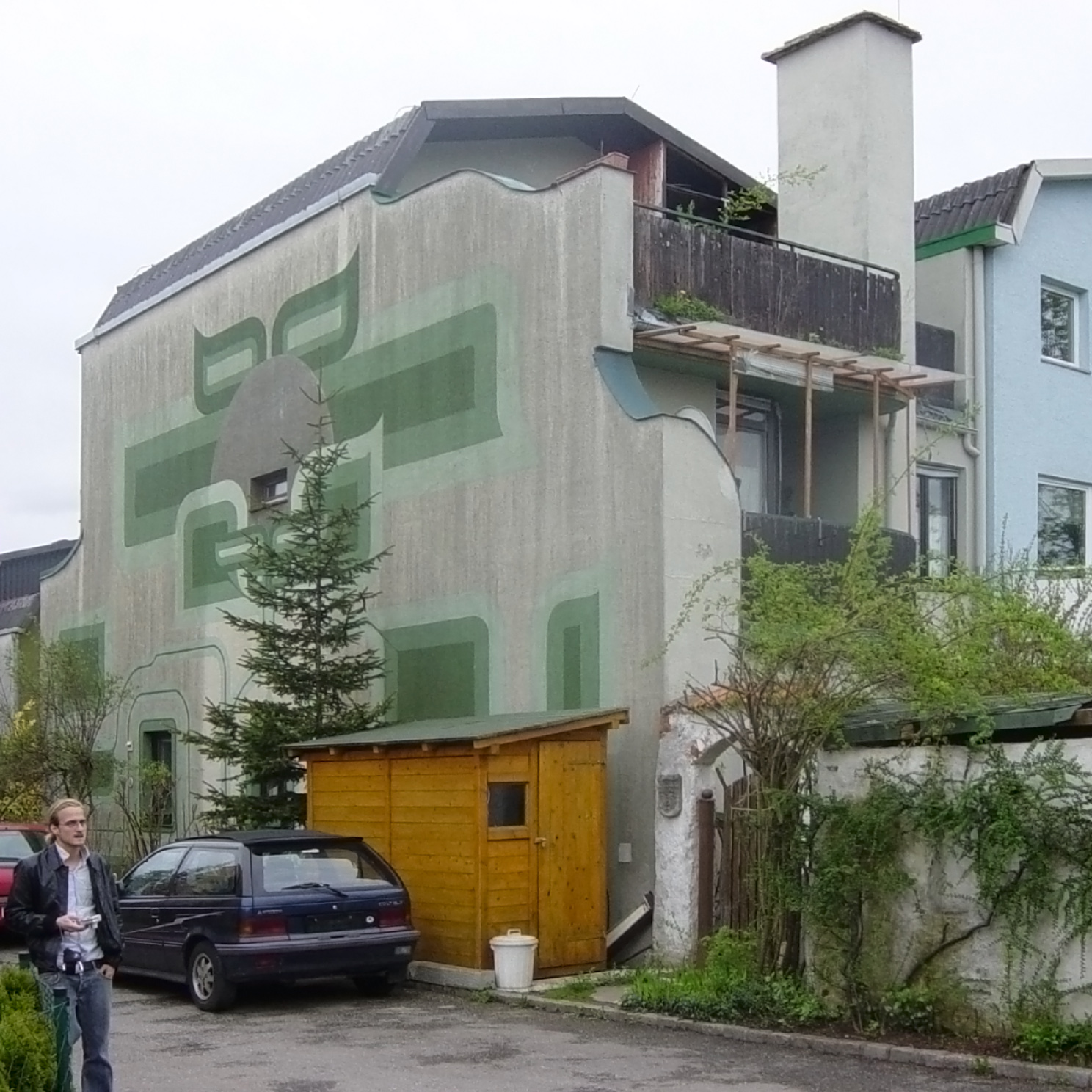
Gerlitz-Gründe housing estate in Graz-Puntigam (1976–1984)

Huth's work after 1972 is primarily characterized by participatory planning processes. Huth specialized in the planning of housing estates, in which the future residents were included in the respective planning processes. Examples of these designs include the Gerlitz-Gründe housing estate in Graz-Puntigam, and the Kloepfer estate in Bärnbach. Some of the housing estates were "self-build projects", where residents participated in both the planning and the construction. The style of the housing estates planned by Huth stands in stark contrast to his projects with Domenig. Unlike before, Huth's later projects were based on the aesthetic ideas and preferences of the users. These designs were restrained and downright conservative, instead of aesthetic avant-garde. For example, the houses in the Gerlitz-Gründe housing estate in Graz-Puntigam have cozy mansard roofs.

In the non-participative planned projects of the 1970s and 1980s, Huth continued to design in the style of the Graz School. The ventilation and control buildings of the Plabutsch tunnel in Raach are aesthetically closely related to the multi-purpose hall at the Institute of the Sisters of St. Francis.

== Prizes ==
- Grand Prix International d'Urbanisme et d'Architecture Cannes (1969), together with Günther Domenig
- European Steel Construction Prize (1975)

== Main works ==
=== In cooperation with Günther Domenig ===
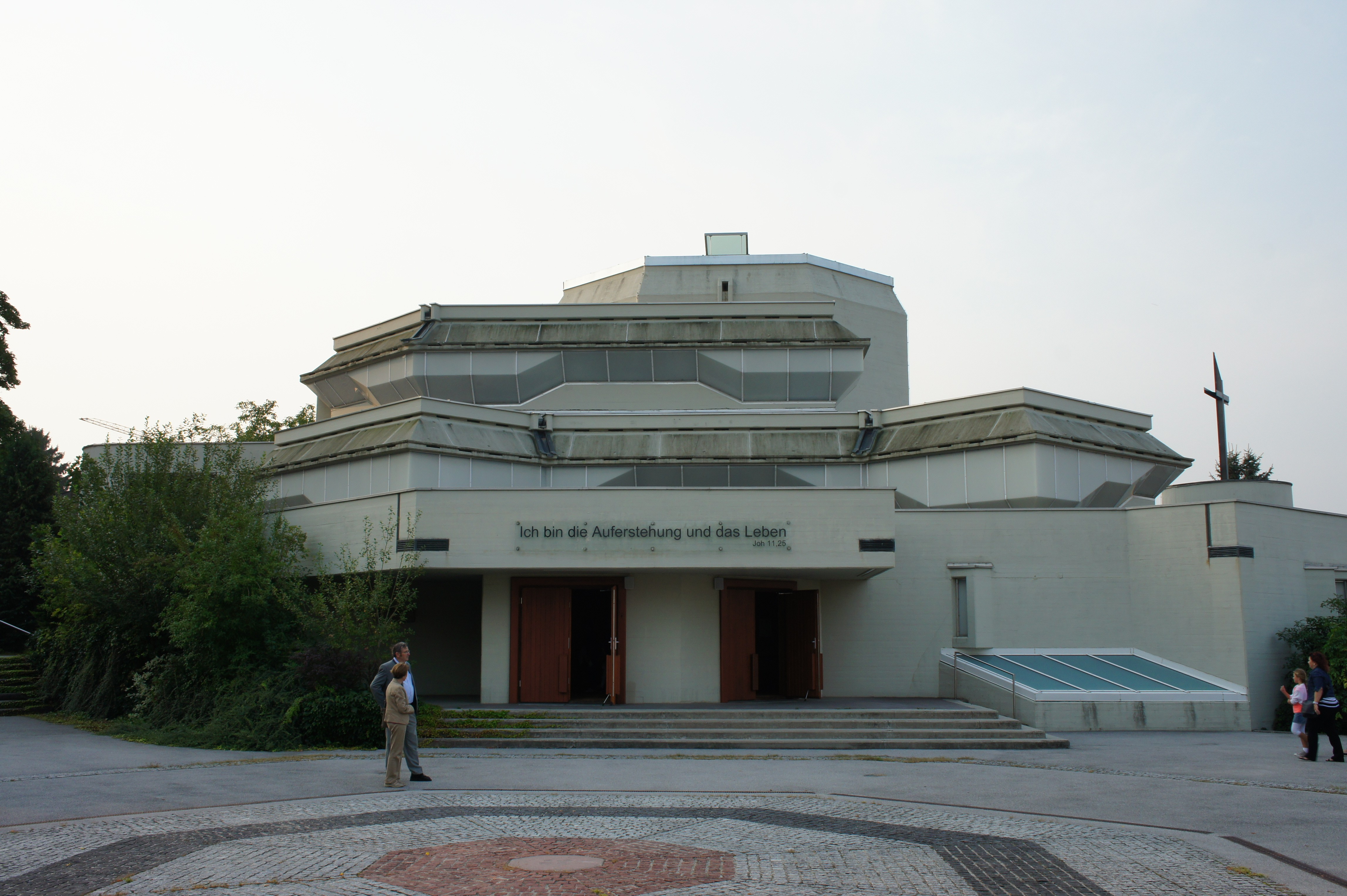
Oberwart Parish Church (1966–1969), designed with Günter Domenig

- 1963–1968: Pedagogic Academy, Graz
- 1965–1969: Parish centre, Oberwart
- 1967: Temporary pavilion for the Trigon 67 art exhibition, Graz
- 1970–1972: Temporary pavilion for the Olympic swimming pool, Munich
- 1970–1973: Temporary restaurant for the 1972 Summer Olympics, Munich
- 1973–1977: Institute of the Sisters of St. Francis, a multi-purpose school in Graz-Eggenberg

=== As an independent architect ===
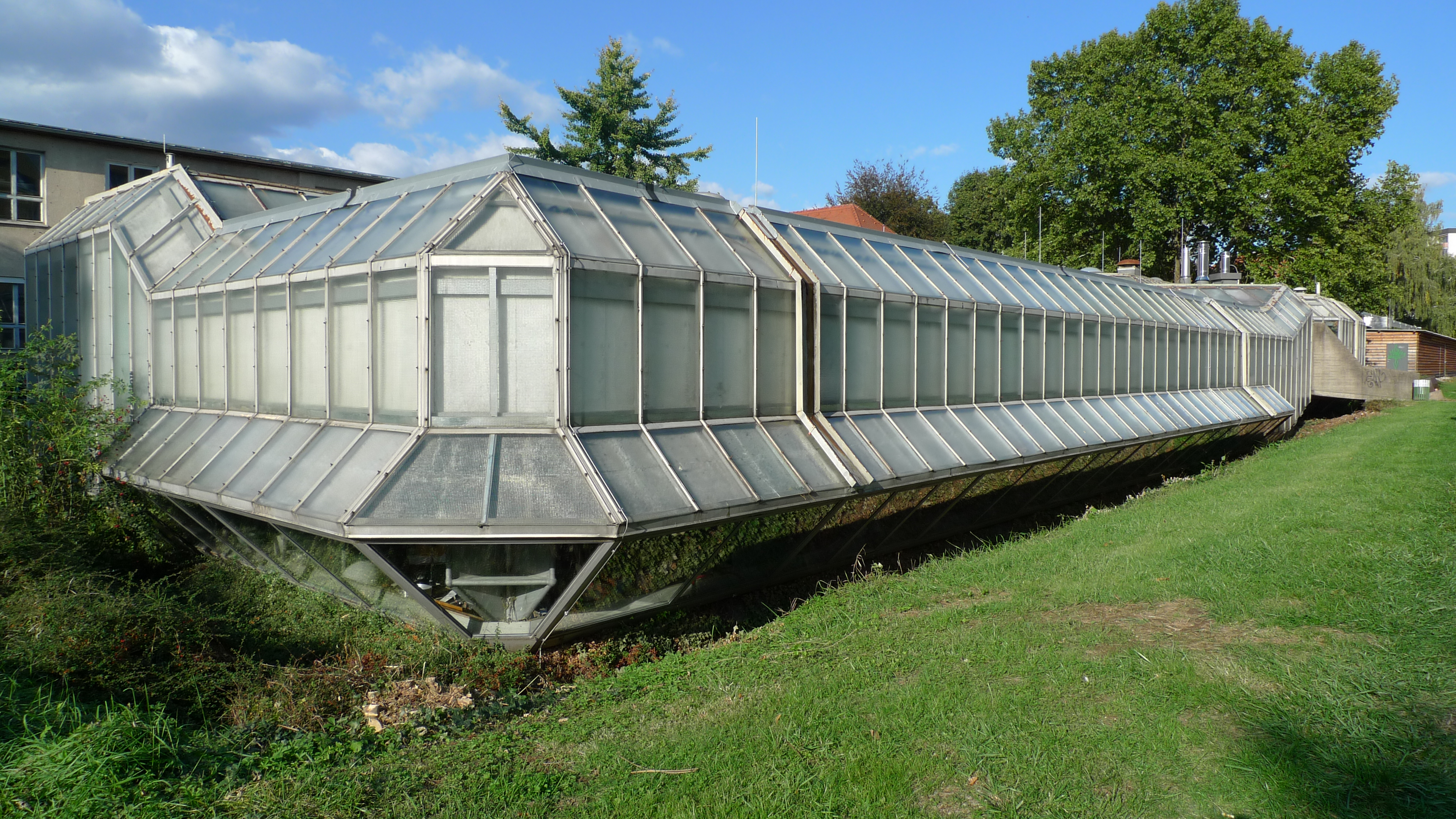
Youth center of the Styrian Chamber of Commerce in Graz (1971–1973)

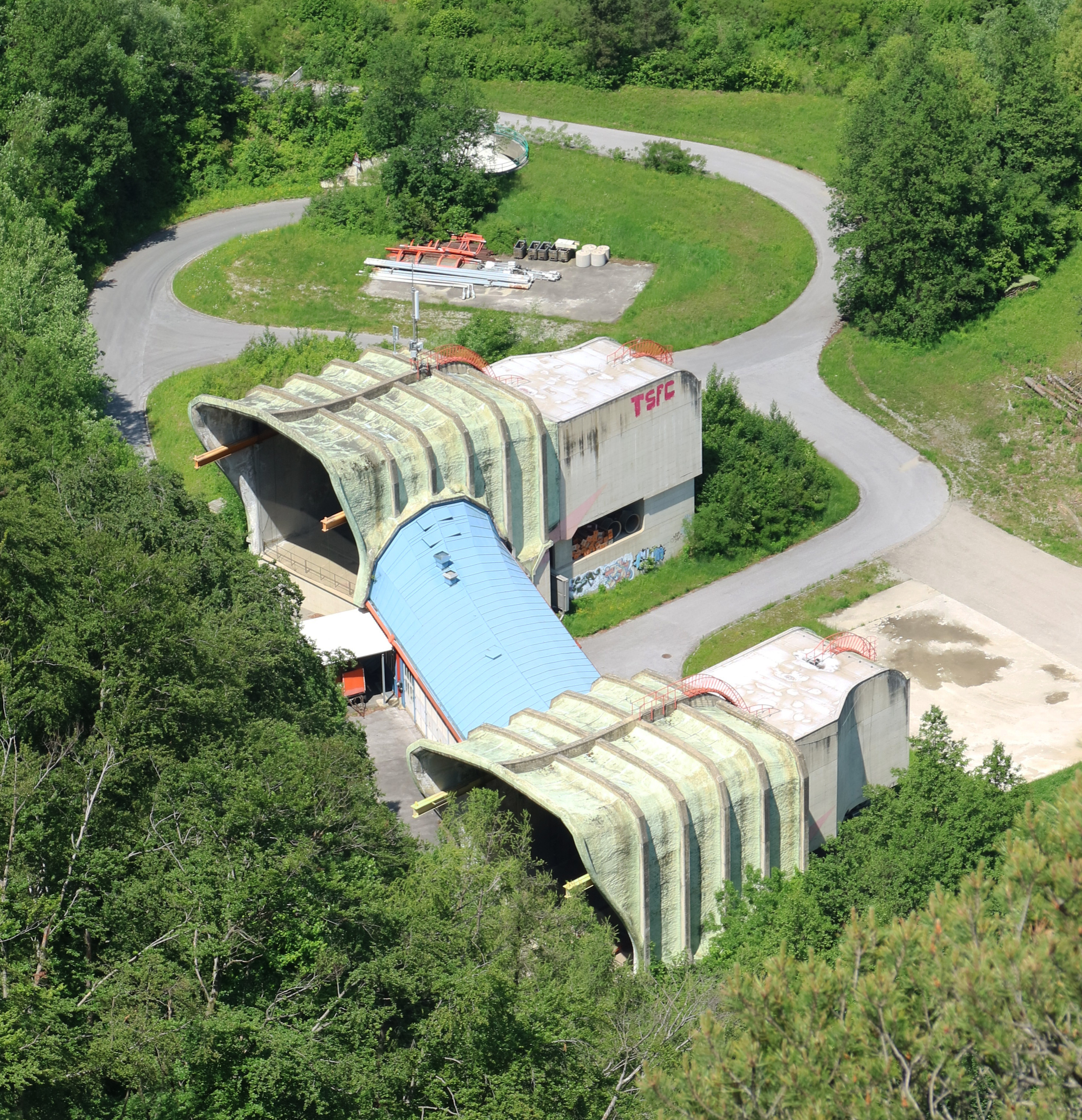
Ventilation buildings and control station at the Plabutsch tunnel in Raach (1982–1987)

- 1967–1968: ÖAAB holiday resort, Ratten
- 1968–1973: Research and Computing Center (FRZ) of the VÖEST Alpine Montangesellschaft, Leoben
- 1971–1973: Youth center of the Styrian Chamber of Commerce, Graz
- 1972–1992: Eschensiedlung housing estate, Deutschlandsberg (scientific research project and participation project)
- 1976–1984: Gerlitz-Gründe housing estate, Graz-Puntigam (participation project)
- 1977–1982: Housing estate BIG I, Karl-Hubmann-Strasse, Deutschlandsberg (participation project)
- 1977–1981: Housing estate, Kaindorf an der Sulm (participation project)
- 1979–1983: Kloepfer estate, Bärnbach, (participation project)
- 1979–1983: Terraced housing, Graz-Thal, (participation project)
- 1980–1983: Housing estate, Rosental an der Kainach (participation project)
- 1981–1988: Housing development, Bärnbach (participation project)
- 1982–1985: Graz-Algersdorf housing estate, Graz (participation project)
- 1982–1985: Residential complex in Voitsberg (participation project)
- 1982–1987: Plabutsch tunnel ventilation buildings and control station, Raach
- 1982–1992: Modernization of the Peter-Tunner-Building, Leoben
- 1986–1992: Ragnitz III residential complex in Graz-Ragnitz (participation project)

== Literature ==
- Blundell Jones, Peter (1998). Dialogues in Time: new Graz architecture. Haus der Architektur Graz. ISBN 3-901174-36-2
- Zach, Juliane (Ed.): Eilfried Huth, Architekt – Varietät als Prinzip. Gebr. Mann, Berlin 1996. ISBN 978-3-7861-1709-4
