= T-Mobile Arena (disambiguation) =

T-Mobile Arena is an arena in Paradise, Nevada, United States, home arena of the Las Vegas Aces and the Las Vegas Golden Knights.

T-Mobile Arena may also refer to:

- Arena Brno, sports and performance venue in Brno, Czech Republic, known officially as T-Mobile Arena
- Sportovní hala Fortuna, sports and performance venue in Prague, Czech Republic, known as T-Mobile Arena between 2002 and 2008

== See also ==
- G-Mobile Arena
- T-Mobile Center
- T-Mobile Park
- T-Center
