= Forced Laborer Memorial Transit =

Coordinates: 49°26′54″N 11°03′56″E

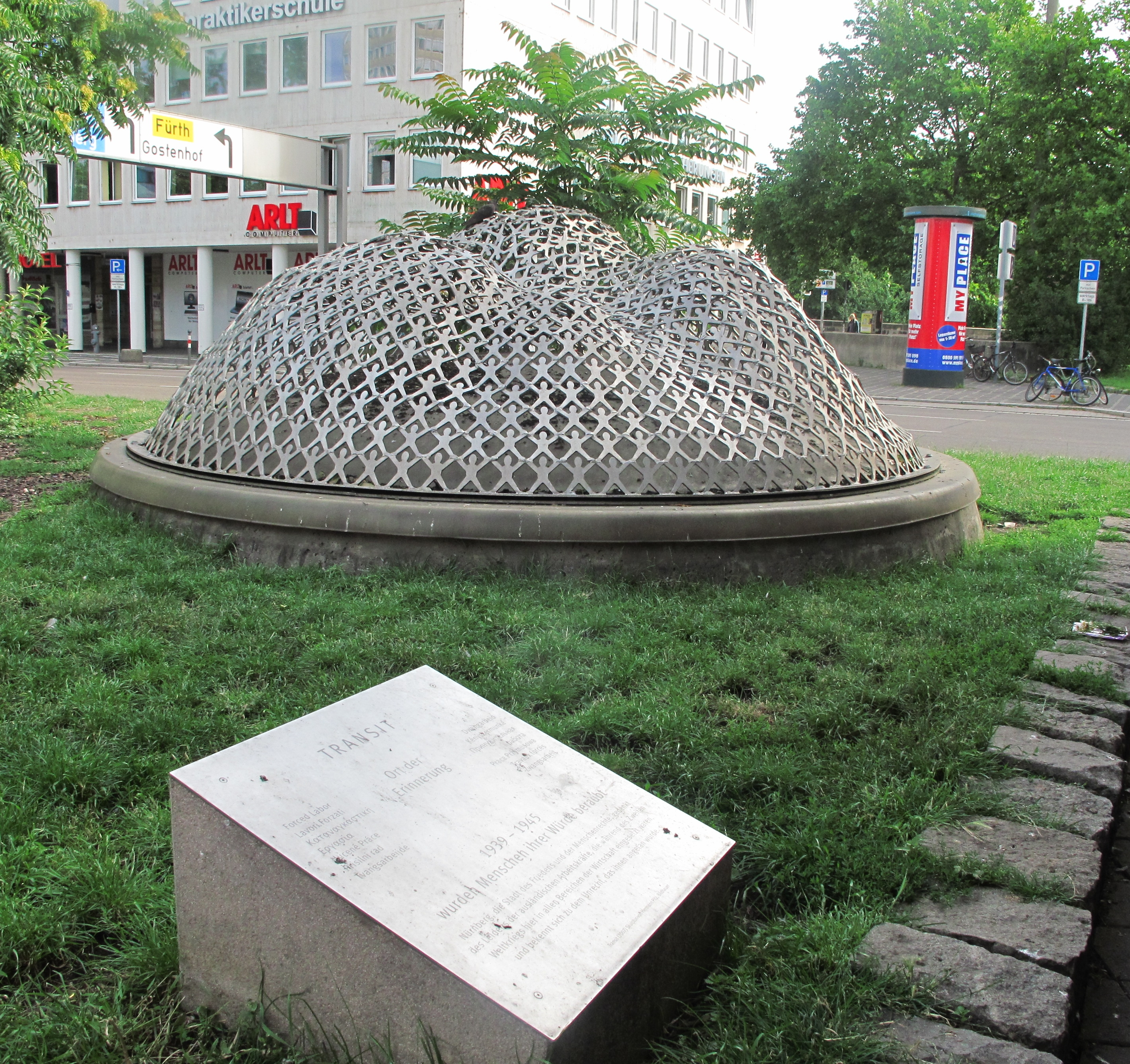
Forced Laborer Memorial "Transit", exterior view

The Forced Laborer Memorial "Transit" is a Nuremberg monument. It is located at the Plärrer, a main traffic junction of the Nuremberg city centre, just outside the city wall. The aim is to keep the memory of the fate of the Nuremberg forced laborers during the Nazi era alive.

== History of the city ==
=== Process of realization ===
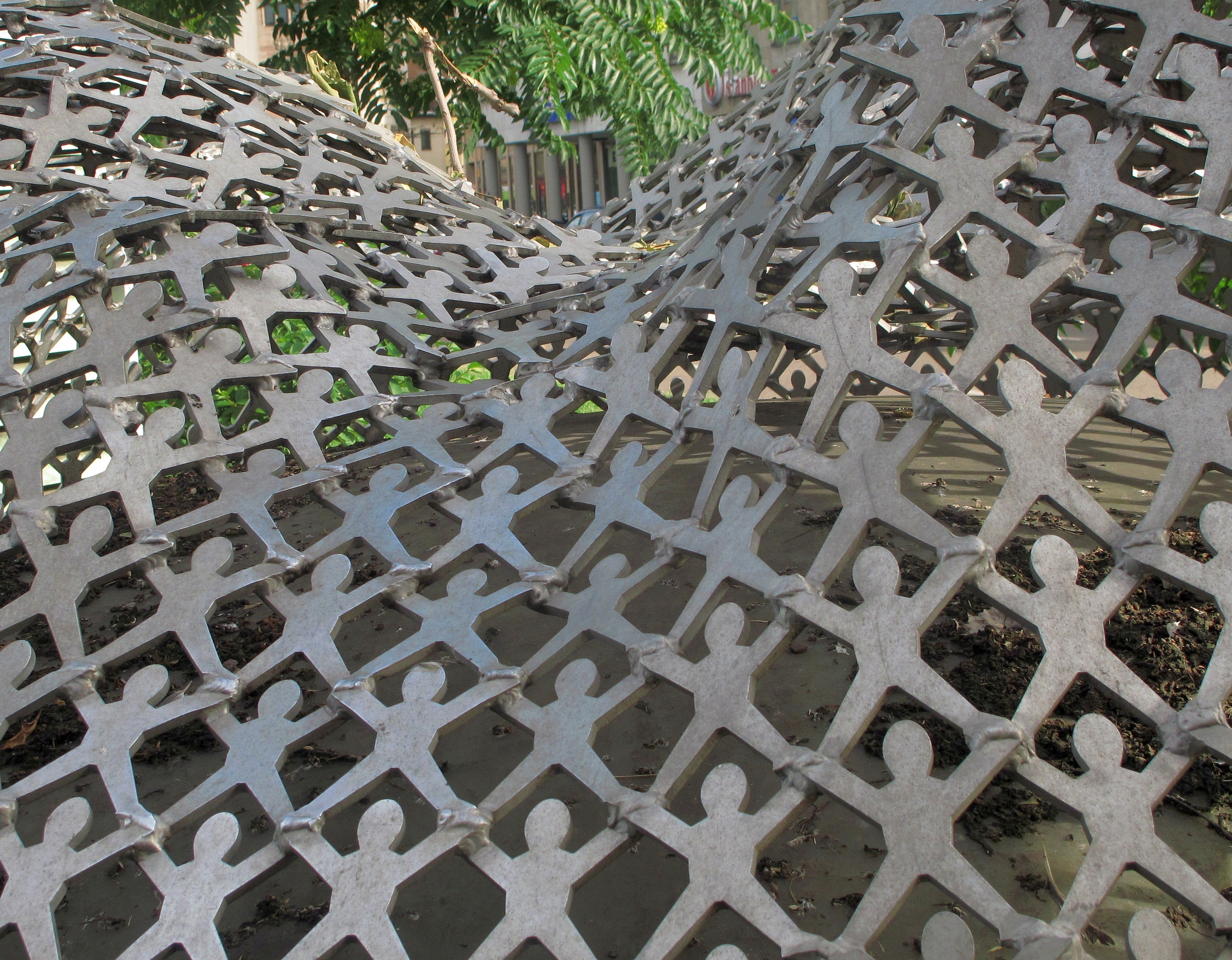
Forced Labor Memorial Detailed View

The realisation of the memorial took 20 years from the passing of the resolution to the inauguration. In 1987 the Nuremberg City Council decided to erect a memorial for Nuremberg forced labourers. The scientific analysis of the history of the deployment of forced laborers in Nuremberg was initiated by the Federal Foundation "Remembrance, Responsibility, Future", which was entrusted with the payment of compensation to victims of National Socialist injustice. The opening event was a contemporary witness discussion that took place in 2002 in the Nuremberg City Archives. Contemporary witness Rob Zweermann complained here that there was no memorial site for the forced laborers deployed in Nuremberg in the Nuremberg city area. His suggestion to set a sign of remembrance was supported by Professor Wolfgang Benz, a renowned historian. The 1987 decision was subsequently given a new Impetus.

The city archives and especially contemporary witness Zweermann, accompanied the further process. Extensive research on the history revealed that between 1939 and 1945 about 100,000 forced laborers from more than 40 countries had been employed at about 150 Nuremberg companies. The focus of employment was on the armaments industry, but there were also deployments in the retail trade and the city administration, for example in the removal of rubble after bombing raids. In order to obtain suitable designs for the forced labor memorial, the Cultural Committee of the City of Nuremberg decided on October 8, 2004 to hold a limited artistic competition and invite eight artists to participate. In the following year 2005, the City of Nuremberg initiated the competition, which the Munich sculptor Hermann Pitz won with his design "Transit" among five submitted works. The jury consisted of twelve members, including cultural and building advisors from the city of Nuremberg, city councillors from all parties, renowned regional and national artists and historians, and Rob Zweerman, a contemporary witness from the Netherlands. The meeting was chaired by Peter Kampehl, Nuremberg artist and chairman of the advisory board for fine arts. The concept of the Transit object was functionally convincing on the one hand because of the successful combination of the street and underground levels of the Plärrer, and on the other because the character of the memorial was also architecturally enriching. The inauguration of the monument took place on 15 October 2007 in the subway distribution floor at Plärrer.

=== Inauguration ===
At the invitation of the City of Nuremberg, former forced labourers from numerous countries, such as the Netherlands, Poland and Ukraine, took part in the inauguration ceremony. Professor Wladyslaw Bartoszewski (born 1922 in Warsaw), who had himself been a prisoner in the Auschwitz concentration camp from 1940 to 1941, delivered the commemorative speech. He was awarded the honorary title of Just Among the Nations and the Peace Prize of the German Book Trade. In his speech, he described the erection of the memorial together with the former forced laborers as an important step towards reconciliation. Robert Zweermann from Rotterdam, himself a former forced laborer in Nuremberg, spoke on behalf of all the forced laborers and played a decisive role in the realization process of the memorial. For him, the memorial "Transit" is a visible sign that "gives shape to the essence of our common existence at that time". The Lord Mayor of Nuremberg, Dr. Ulrich Maly, emphasized three functions of the memorial in his speech. It serves to commemorate the affected people who were deprived of their dignity here in Nuremberg, together with the Documentation Centre, the Memorium of the Nuremberg Trials and the terrain information system "Former Reich Party Rally Grounds" it is part of the city's culture of remembrance and, through its informative, documenting and confrontational character, contributes to assuming political responsibility for the German guilt.

== The memorial in detail ==
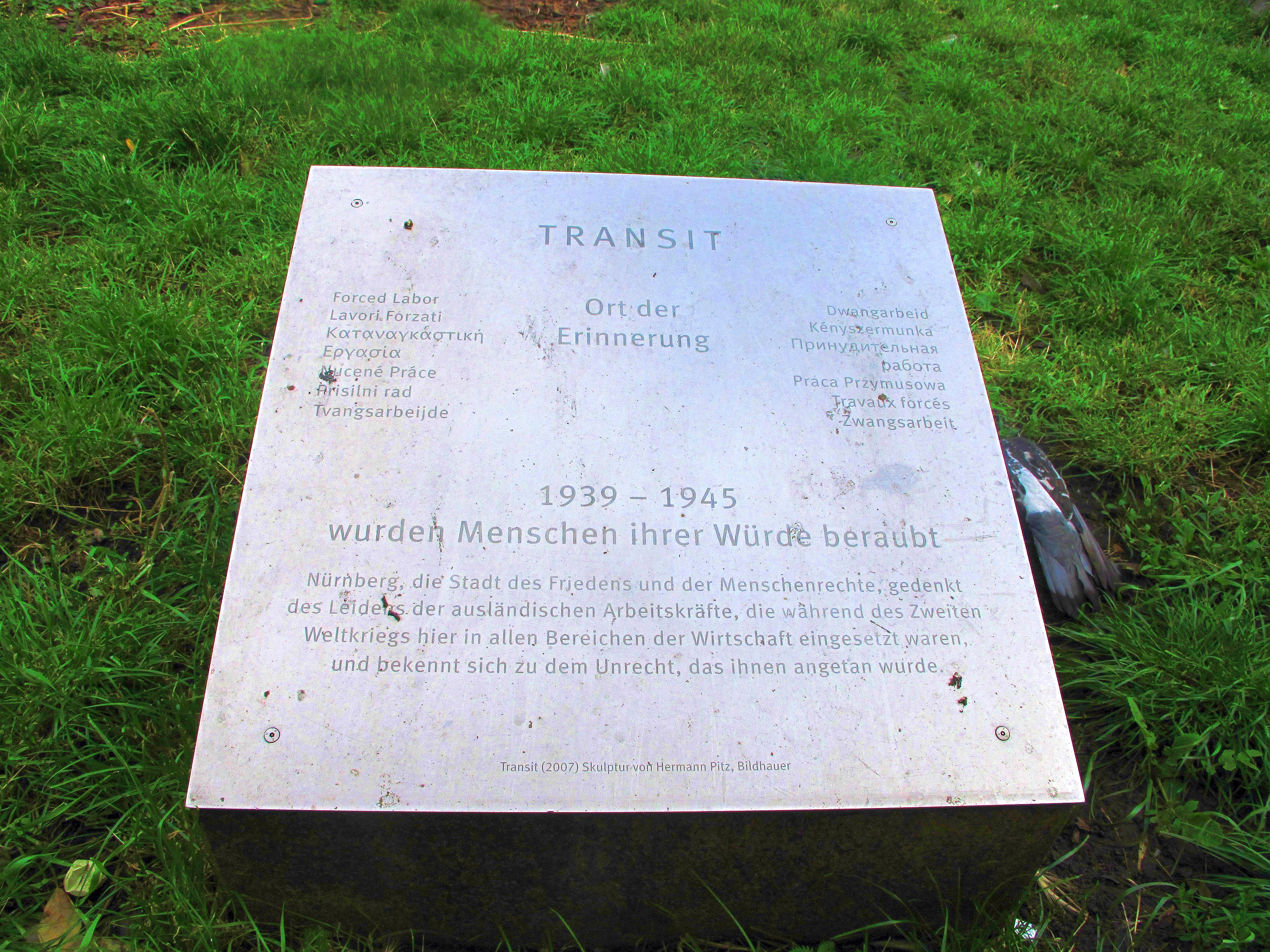
Explanation panel

The memorial is a six-meter-high funnel-shaped sculpture, composed of 3,000 aluminum figures symbolically grabbing each other's hands and connected by their feet. This funnel is placed on the light dome of the subway station at the Plärrer, making it visible both at street level as a dome and underground in its continuation as a cone in the mezzanine floor foyer and pedestrian underpass.

Three explanatory text panels contain the word forced labour in twelve languages, followed by a statement by the City of Nuremberg.

"From 1939 to 1945 people were deprived of their dignity. Nuremberg, the city of peace and human rights, commemorates the suffering of the foreign workers who were employed here in all areas of the economy during the Second World War and confesses the injustice done to them."

— Text of explanation panel

The City of Nuremberg invested a total of €50,000 in the realisation of the Memorial.

== Location ==
The memorial is located at the Nürnberger Plärrer, a main traffic junction in Nuremberg. On the one hand, the location is reminiscent of the former Plärrer automat - a generously designed waiting hall with an inn and public telephone - which was a popular meeting place for forced laborers and was of great importance as an inconspicuous information and goods exchange. On the other hand, the central location is intended to keep the history of the forced laborers deployed in Nuremberg in the memory of the city, its citizens and guests.

== Criticism ==
In an interview with Herrmann Pitz, Rob Zweermann, spokesman for the former forced laborers in Nuremberg, criticized the length of the process leading to the realization of the memorial. Lack of understanding and repeated delays on the part of the city administration demanded a lot of patience and perseverance from the supporters. This problem has also been taken up by the Nuremberg press. The budget of €50,000 provided by the City of Nuremberg was described by Zweermann as poor. He put it in relation to the number of forced laborers accommodated in Nuremberg and calculated an amount of 0.50 Euro per person.
