= SDS (company) =

Software Daten Service
- Type: Limited liability company (Gesellschaft mit beschränkter Haftung)
- Industry: Software
- Founded: 1974
- Headquarters: Vienna, Austria
- Products: Banking software
- Website: www.sds.at/en

GEOS (Global Entity Online System) is an integrated online system for the management and processing of securities, with a strong focus on Straight Through Processing (STP). The main components of GEOS (management of financial instruments, position keeping and order management) cover the entire value chain of securities transactions – ranging from securities orders to clearing and settlement to Corporate actions processing (e.g. for dividend payments).

GEOS has been developed by Software Daten Service (SDS) – a 100% subsidiary of T-Systems International. Headquarters of SDS are in Vienna in the T-Center.

Customers include HSBC Trinkaus, Raiffeisen Österreich, Bank Austria (a member of UniCredit), UniCredit Țiriac Bank in Romania and Banque et Caisse d'Épargne de l'État in Luxembourg. GEOS covers around 80% of the Austrian securities processing market.

GEOS originated from the software EOS, which was developed by the Austrian Schöllerbank in the 1980s and offered to other Austrian banks by Software Daten Service. The development of GEOS started in 1993 and the system was put in operation by a bank for the first time in 1998.
