= Ratten =

- Municipality
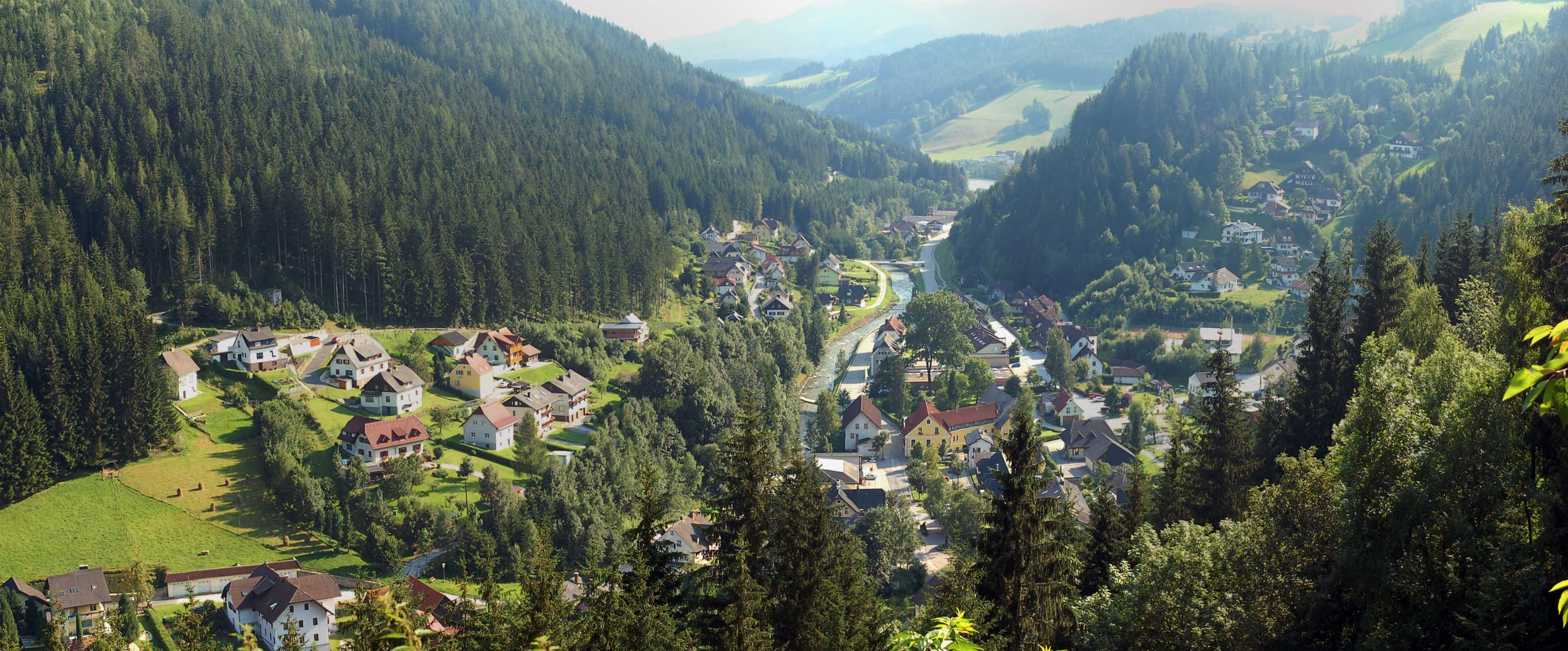
- View of Ratten

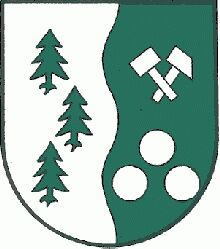
- Coat of arms

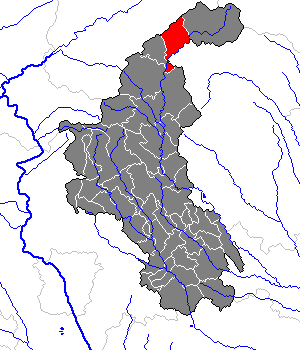
- Location within Weiz district

- Location within Austria
- Coordinates: 47°29′00″N 15°43′00″E
- Country: Austria
- State: Styria
- District: Weiz

Government
  - Mayor: Thomas Heim (SPÖ)

Area
  - Total: 28.71 km^{2} (11.08 sq mi)
- Elevation: 765 m (2,510 ft)

Population (2018-01-01)
  - Total: 1,122
  - Density: 39.08/km^{2} (101.2/sq mi)
- Time zone: UTC+1 (CET)
  - Summer (DST): UTC+2 (CEST)
- Postal code: 8673
- Area code: 03173
- Vehicle registration: WZ
- Website: www.ratten-steiermark.at

Ratten is a municipality in the district of Weiz in the Austrian state of Styria.

== Geography ==
Ratten lies about 25 km (16 mi) north of Weiz in the upper Feistritz valley.
