= Documentation Center Nazi Party Rally Grounds =

Museum in Nuremberg, Germany

- Dokumentationszentrum Reichsparteitagsgelände
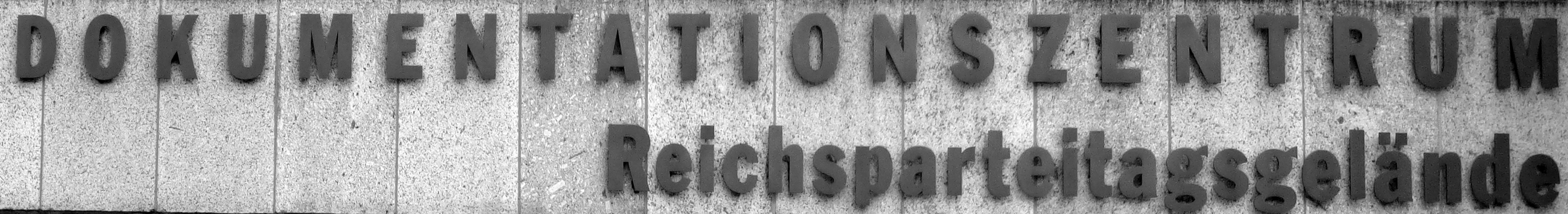
- Name on the Congress Hall

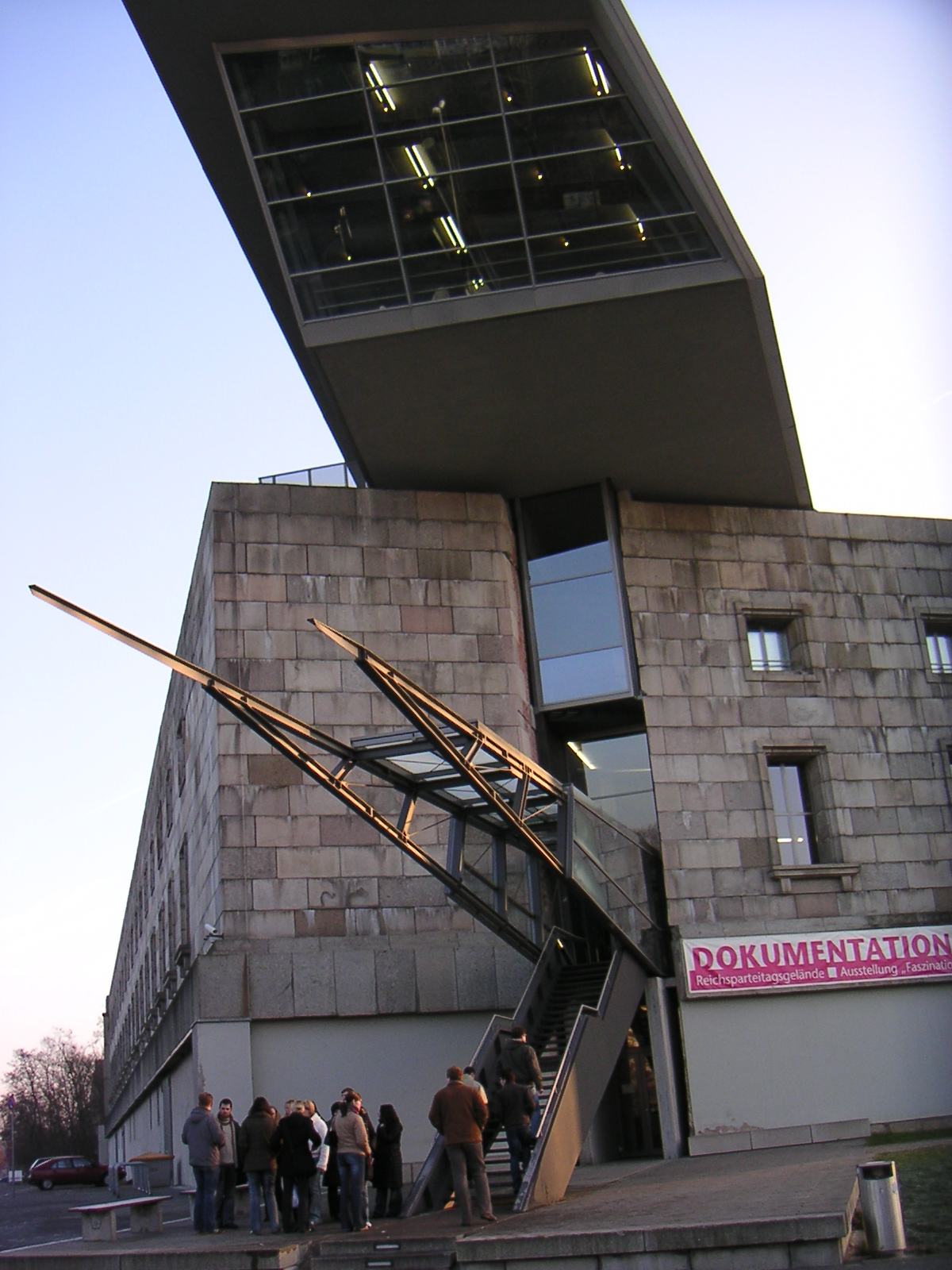
- Entrance to the Documentation Center
- Established: 4 November 2001
- Location: Nuremberg
- Coordinates: 49°26′02″N 11°06′46″E
- Type: Historical
- Visitors: 311,588 (2019)
- Director: Prof. Dr. Imanuel Baumann
- Architect: Günther Domenig
- Owner: Nuremberg City
- Website: https://museums.nuernberg.de/documentation-center/

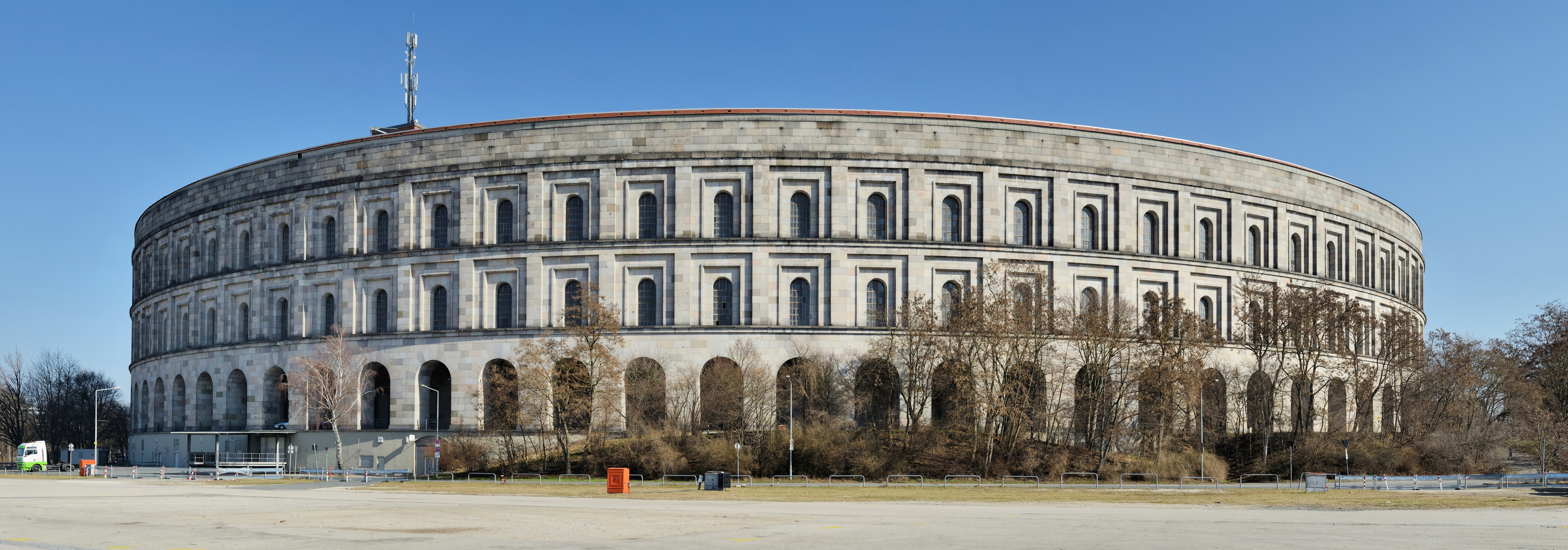
The Congress Hall

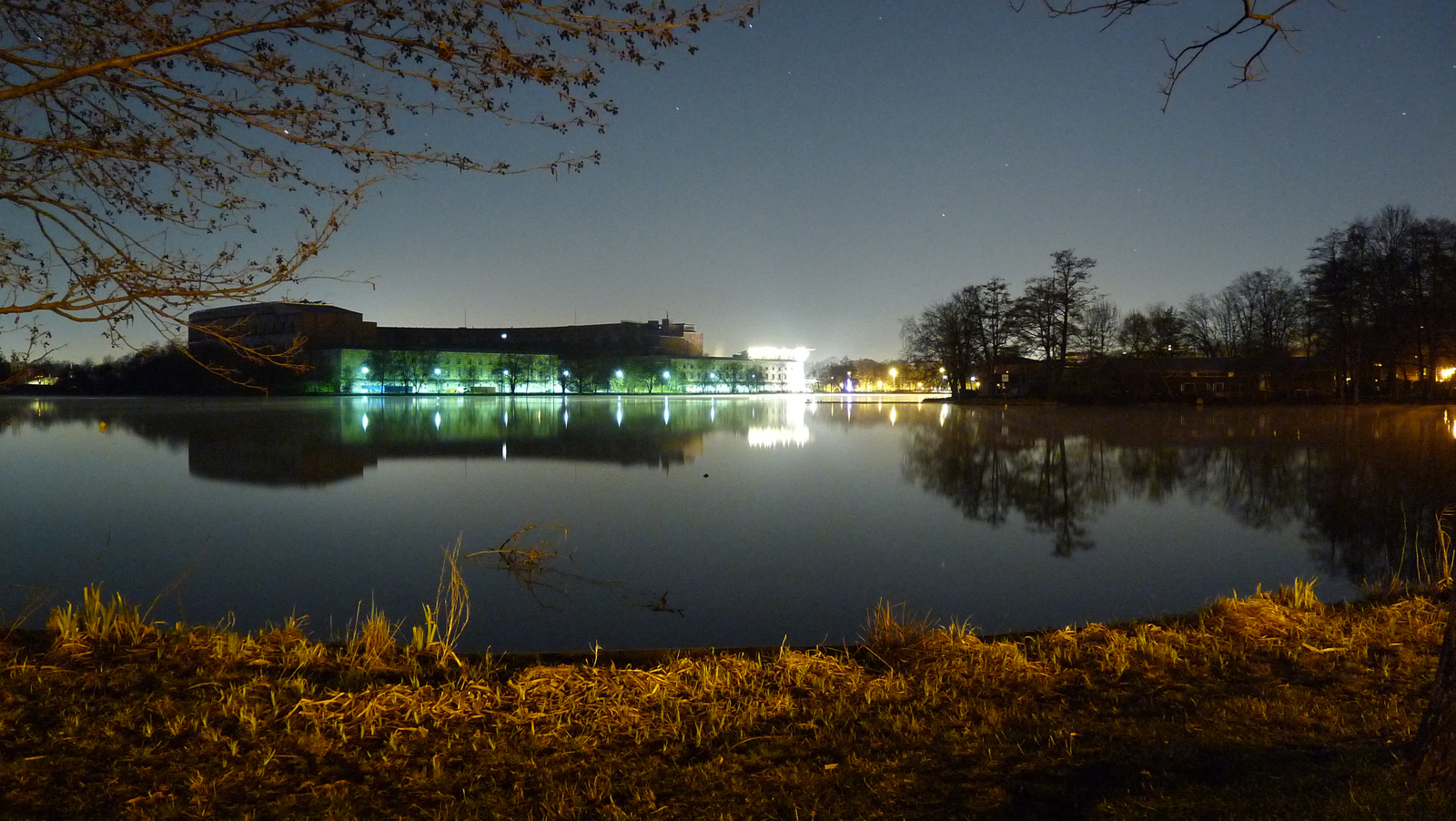
Documentation Center seen from the lake

The Documentation Center Nazi Party Rallying Grounds (German: Dokumentationszentrum Reichsparteitagsgelände) is a museum in Nuremberg. It is in the north wing of the unfinished remains of the Congress Hall of the former Nazi party rallies. From 2001 to 2020, it housed the "Fascination and Terror" exhibition concerning the causes, connections, and consequences of Nazi Germany. The center is currently under renovation and houses an interim exhibition. Attached to the museum is an education forum.

== Architecture ==
In 1994 the city council of Nuremberg decided to establish the Documentation Center. Austrian architect Günther Domenig designed the museum, winning the 1998 international competition with his proposal to spear through the northern head of the building with a diagonal glass and steel passageway. Inherent in the gesture of this project is a pun on the name and a refutation of the chief Nazi architect Albert Speer (the last name translates to "spear") who had directed a masterplan for this site including a Zeppelin Field, a stadium to hold 400,000, a March Field for military exercises, a Congress Hall for 50,000, and a 55-metre (180 ft) wide Great Road. This is where Speer had created the "cathedral of light" and where the Nazis drew nearly a million people in rallies between 1933 and 1938. These were captured on film by Leni Riefenstahl in Triumph of the Will. Domenig, the son of a Nazi judge, confronted his own personal history in addition to the history and Nazi architecture of the project's site. On 4 November 2001 the project was unveiled by Johannes Rau, then President of Germany.

== Exhibition ==
The former permanent exhibition "Fascination and Terror" (Faszination und Gewalt) studied the causes, coherence, and consequences of National Socialism. It described the Nazi Party Rallies and explained the fascination they exercised upon participants and visitors. At the same time, the exhibition endeavored to explain what led to the National Socialists' criminal exercise of power and to reveal how the various causal factors were interrelated. A further goal was a frank presentation of the violent consequences that ensued for the population. The events that are inseparably linked with Nuremberg ("city of the party rally" — Stadt der Reichsparteitage) and the National Socialist period were also explained: the activities of Julius Streicher, editor of the anti-Semitic rabble-rousing weekly Der Stürmer (The Storm Trooper), the history of the Nuremberg Rally, the proclamation of the so-called Nuremberg Laws in 1935, the buildings of the Nazi party rally grounds and the trouble with Nazi architecture after 1945, and the criminal Nuremberg Trials against the chief executives of the National Socialist agenda in 1945–1946 and twelve succeeding trials. The exhibition concluded with an examination of the problem that has been with Germany since 1945: how Germans should deal with the legacy in stone left at the Party Rally Grounds by the National Socialists.

The exhibition was structured in chronological order. The individual exhibition rooms varied in size and structure. They ranged from corridors of just a few square meters in size to large halls. The exhibition area offered a total of 1,300 square meters of floor space.

The exhibition was presented in narrative form. Use was made of classical exhibition methods as well as of modern forms of presentation. Five films newly created for the Documentation Center were essential elements on the route through the exhibition. Easy-to-use electronic display stations on various topics offered a wealth of informative pictorial material. Eyewitness interviews which were especially filmed were aimed at making history much more amenable, particularly for the younger generation. A wearable "Audioguide" led visitors through the exhibition in English, French, Italian, Spanish, Russian, and Polish.

The exhibition "Fascination and Terror" was closed at the end of 2020 and the City of Nuremberg started expanding the Documentation Center Nazi Party Rally Grounds. From May 2021, a specially designed Interim Exhibition, "Nuremberg – Site of the Nazi Party Rallies. The Staging, the Experience, the Violence," in the large Exhibition Hall of the Documentation Center, presents a concise history of the Nazi Party Rallies and the Grounds. The opening of a new permanent exhibition was planned for 2025. This new exhibition will occupy a larger space and offer expanded content as well as a Media and Research Center.

== Education forum ==
The attached education forum was in the glazed cube on the roof of the congress hall. A union of seven Nuremberg educational institutions under the management of the museen der stadt nürnberg makes possible an extensive and target group oriented program. The offer extended from 45 minute exhibition tours to several day seminars aimed at school classes for both youth and adult groups. The content included such topics as "the power of images", "youth between adaptation and resistance", and "the system of concentration camps."

The partners of the education center are:

- Geschichte Für Alle e.V. – Institut für Regionalgeschichte
- Jugendakademie im Caritas-Pirckheimer-Haus
- Jugendzentrum für kulturelle und politische Bildung der Stadt Nürnberg
- Jugendring/Kreisjugendring Nürnberg-Stadt
- Kunst -und Kulturpädagogisches Zentrum der Museen in Nürnberg
- Menschenrechtsbüro der Stadt Nürnberg
- Nürnberger Menschenrechtszentrum e.V.

== Awards ==
In 2001, the Innovation-prize of the Nuremberg region was awarded to the partners of the Documentation Center in the education forum.

In 2002, the British Guild of Travel Writers awarded the Documentation Center with an award for Best New Overseas Tourism Project.

In 2004, Günther Domenig was honored by the 9th International Architecture Exhibition of the Venice Biennale in their section "Transformations." The citation remarked on the opposition of the geometry between the project by Domenig versus the existing structure, and the resulting creation of a profound memorial.

== Information system ==
Since May 2006, the exhibition in the Documentation Center had been supplemented by an information system with 23 stele in the grounds, that made possible an individual tour of the former Nazi Party Rallying Grounds.

== Literature ==
- Desel, Jutta; Sonnenberger, Franz; Symposium (2000). Die Zukunft der Vergangenheit : wie soll die Geschichte des Nationalsozialismus in Museen und Gedenkstätten im 21. Jahrhundert vermittelt werden?; Internationales Symposium am 13. und 14. November 1999 im Deutsch-Amerikanischen Institut/Amerika Haus in Nürnberg = The future of the past (in German). Nürnberg: Museen der Stadt Nürnberg. ISBN 3-9807488-0-4. OCLC 248203316.
- "Katalog "Faszination und Gewalt"". Dokumentationszentrums Reichsparteitagsgelände (in German).
- Christmeier, Martina; Wager, Melanie; Haberland, Fiona; Jenkins, John; Museen der Stadt Nürnberg; Michael Imhof Verlag; Dokumentationszentrum Reichsparteitagsgelände Nürnberg (2021). Nuremberg, site of the Nazi Party rallies : staging, experience and violence : exhibition catalogue of the Documentation Center Nazi Party Rally Grounds. Nürnberg. ISBN 978-3-7319-1146-3. OCLC 1264031794.

== Video ==
- "Ruins of the Reich R.J. Adams DVD (Then & Now documentary exploration of the NSDAP party grounds)
