= T-Center =

Office building in Landstraße, Vienna, Austria

Coordinates: 48°11′12″N 16°24′13″E

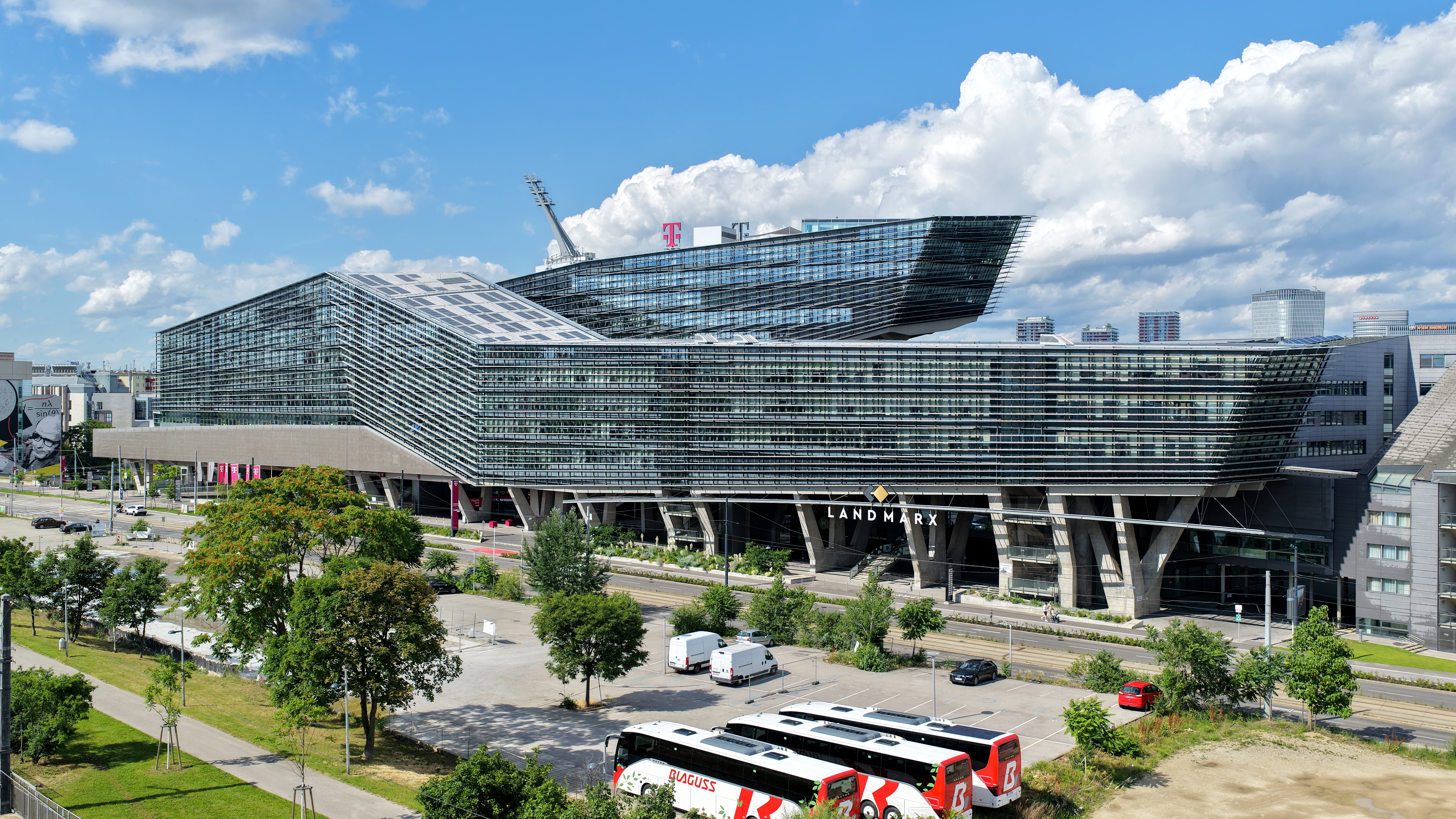
South view of the building “T-Center“.

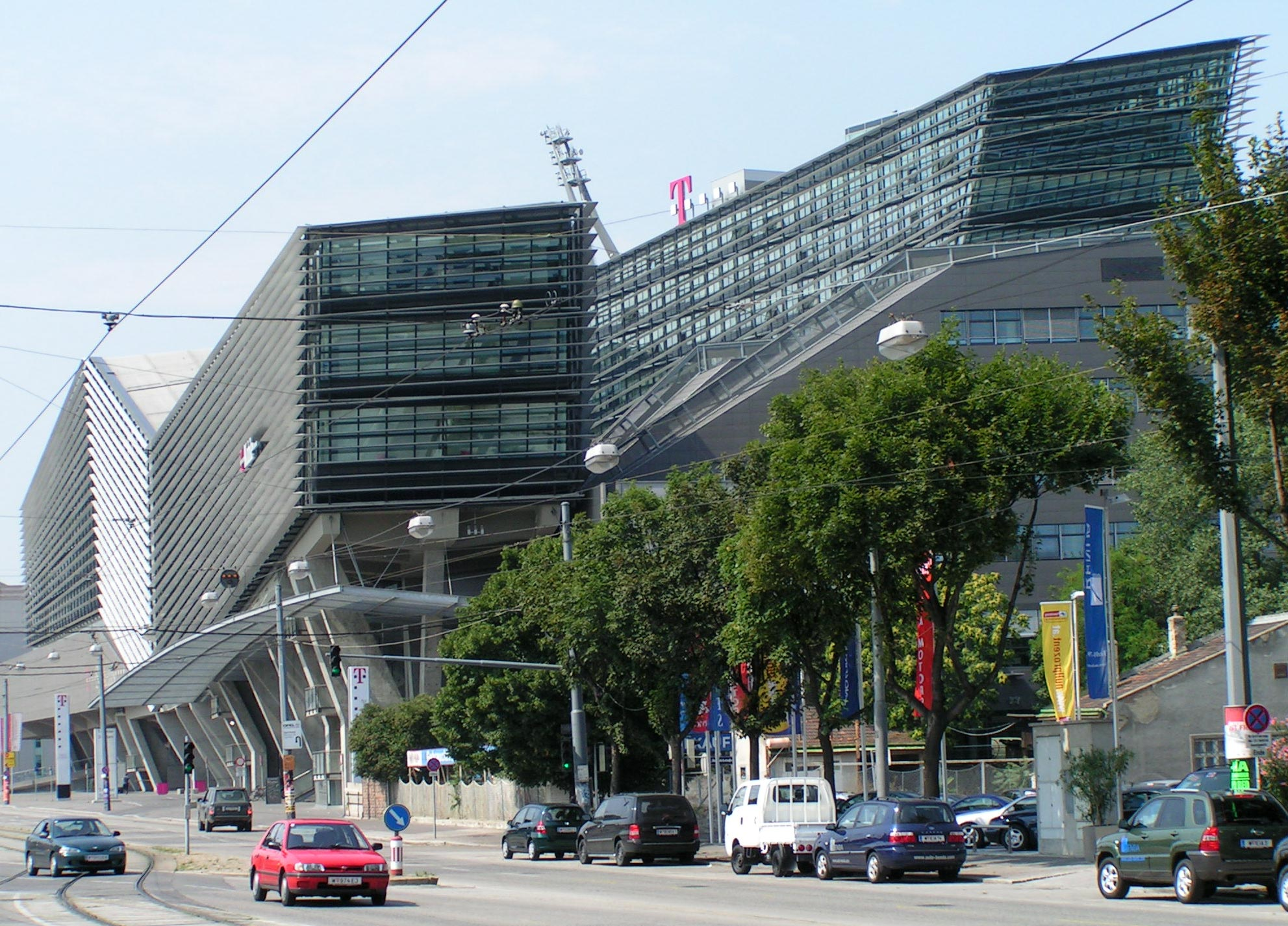
Southeast close up view of the T-Center from Rennweg.

The T-Center is an office building in the Sankt Marx section of Landstraße, the 3rd district of Vienna. It was built between the years 2002 and 2004 following the designs of Austrian architect Günther Domenig.

== History ==
The beginning of construction of the T-Center in 2002 commenced a new development concerning town planning and construction in the area of the former cattle market and slaughterhouse in the Viennese quarter of Sankt Marx. Built after the plans of architect Günther Domenig and his team of Hermann Eisenköck, and Herfried Peyker, in an efficient time of only 27 months, the first offices were opened in 2004. The tenants of the office spaces are the Deutsche-Telekom subsidiaries T-Mobile, T-Systems and Software Daten Service. In addition, the ground floor is occupied by publicly accessible restaurants.

== Criticism and awards ==
Due to the unconventional form and the use of unfinished concrete surfaces the T-Center rapidly gathered attention beyond the city boundaries, however the public discussed the building quite controversially. Furthermore, the employees of the companies accommodated there criticized the structural peculiarities, expressing their preferences and opinions as to the design in relation to the building's practical usefulness.

Günther Domenig and the design team received the following awards for the T-Center:

- 2004: Otto Wagner Städtebaupreis
- 2006: Österreichischer Staatspreis for Architecture
- 2006: The Chicago Athenaeum International Architecture Award for the best new global design

== Data ==
The T-Center has an effective area of 119,000 m^{2} of office space for around 3,000 employees, with a gross area of 134,000 m^{2}. With a length of 255 meters, the building's height reaches 60 meters.
