= Raach am Hochgebirge =

- Municipality
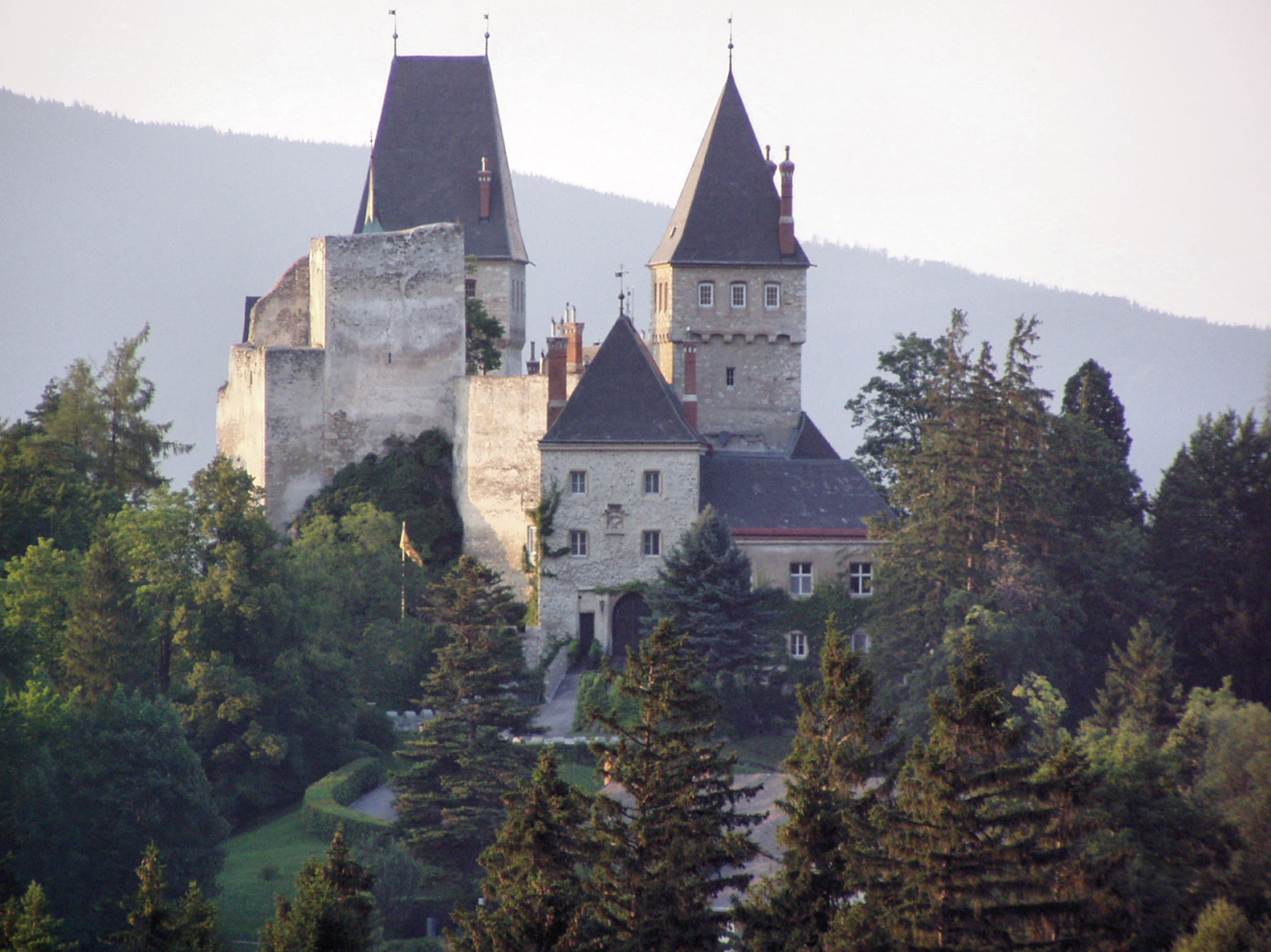
- Wartenstein castle

- Coat of arms

- Location within Austria
- Coordinates: 47°38′N 15°56′E
- Country: Austria
- State: Lower Austria
- District: Neunkirchen

Government
  - Mayor: Thomas Stranz (ÖVP)

Area
  - Total: 13.24 km^{2} (5.11 sq mi)
- Elevation: 813 m (2,667 ft)

Population (2018-01-01)
  - Total: 281
  - Density: 21.2/km^{2} (55.0/sq mi)
- Time zone: UTC+1 (CET)
  - Summer (DST): UTC+2 (CEST)
- Postal code: 2640
- Area code: 02662
- Website: www.raach.at

Raach am Hochgebirge is a town in the district of Neunkirchen in the Austrian state of Lower Austria.

== Population ==
Historical population
Year	Pop.	±%
1869	467	—
1880	480	+2.8%
1890	426	−11.3%
1900	483	+13.4%
1910	506	+4.8%
1923	477	−5.7%
1934	481	+0.8%
1939	481	+0.0%
1951	457	−5.0%
1961	444	−2.8%
1971	361	−18.7%
1981	325	−10.0%
1991	323	−0.6%
2001	304	−5.9%
2011	277	−8.9%
