= Günther Domenig =

Austrian architect (1934–2012)

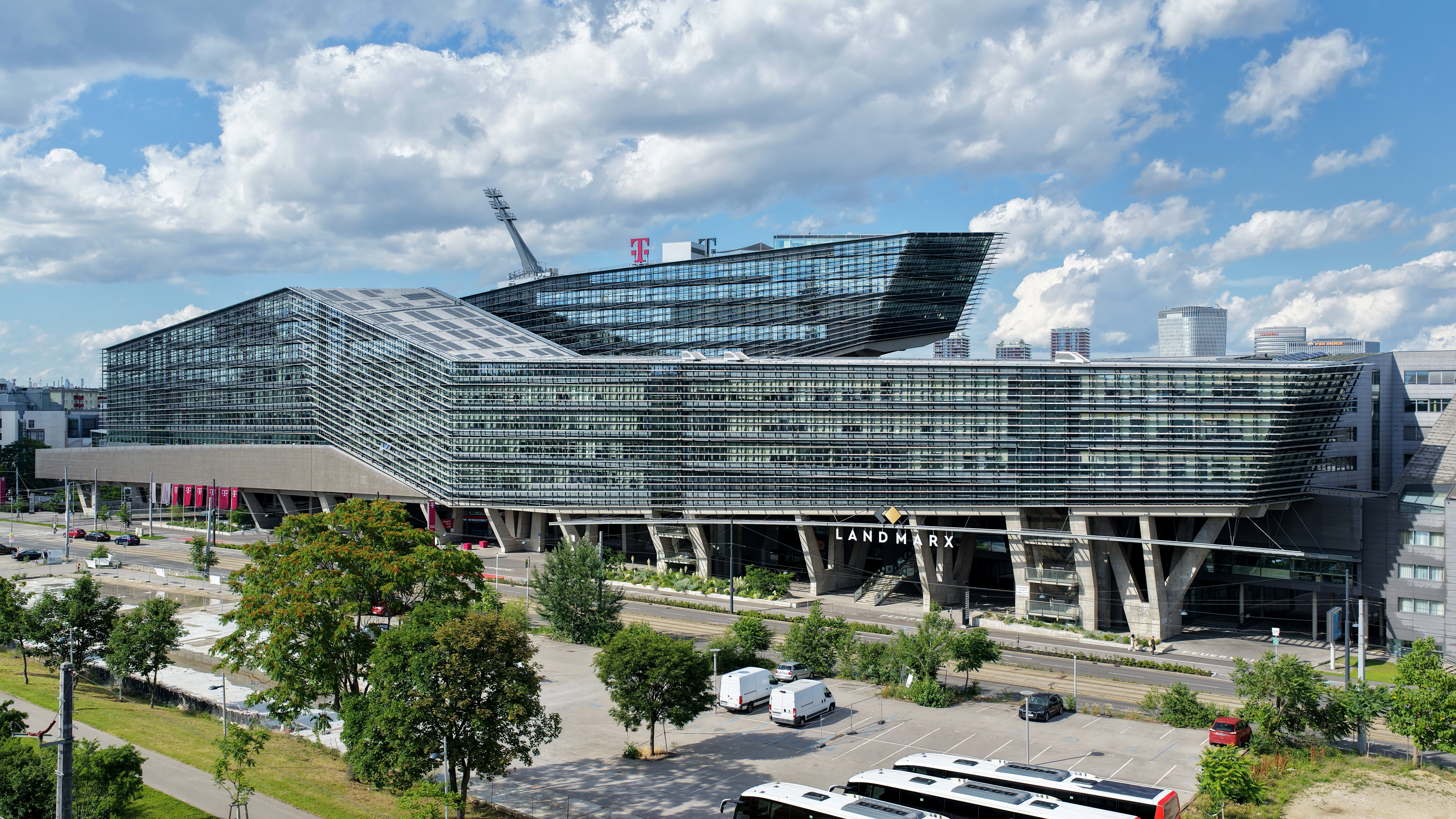
T-Center Wien (built in 2004)

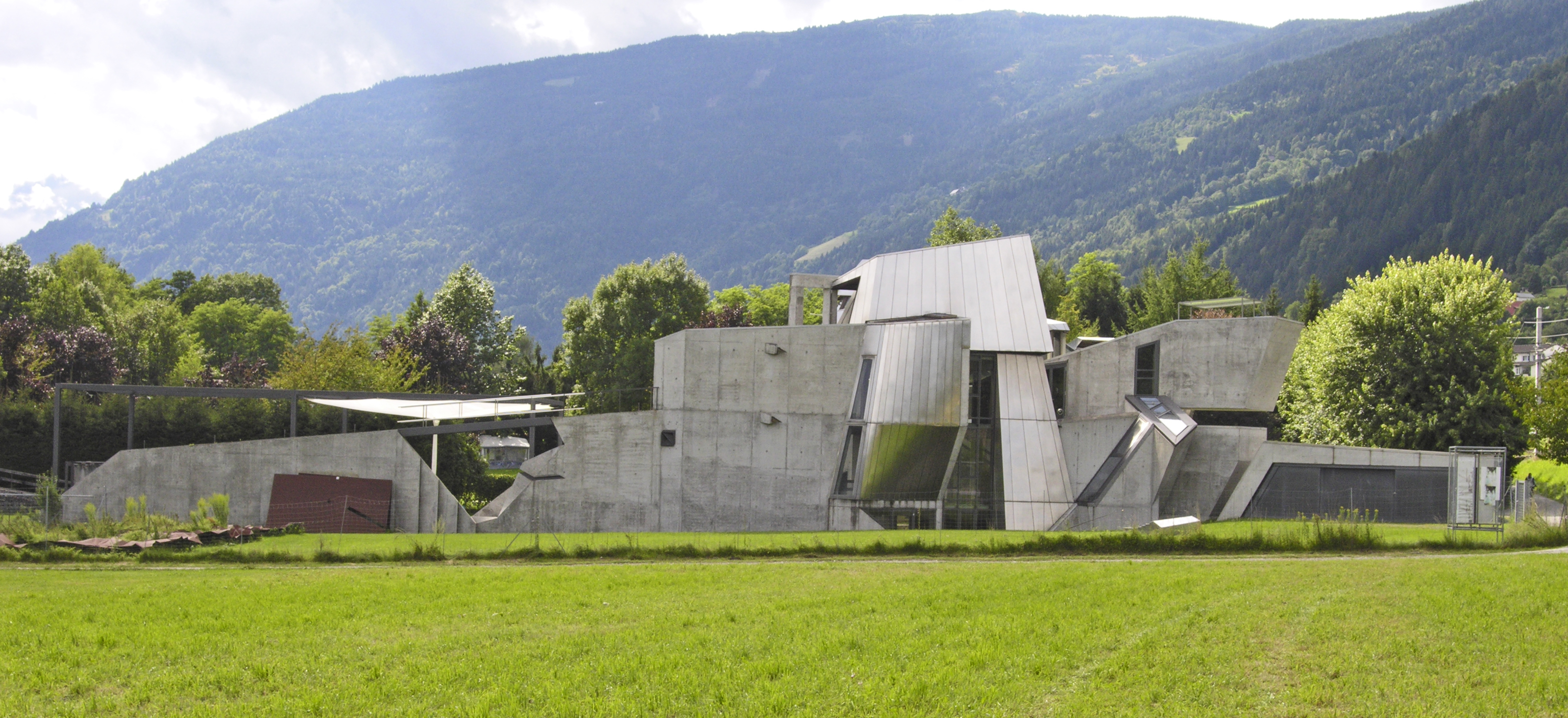
'Steinhaus' at Lake Ossiach

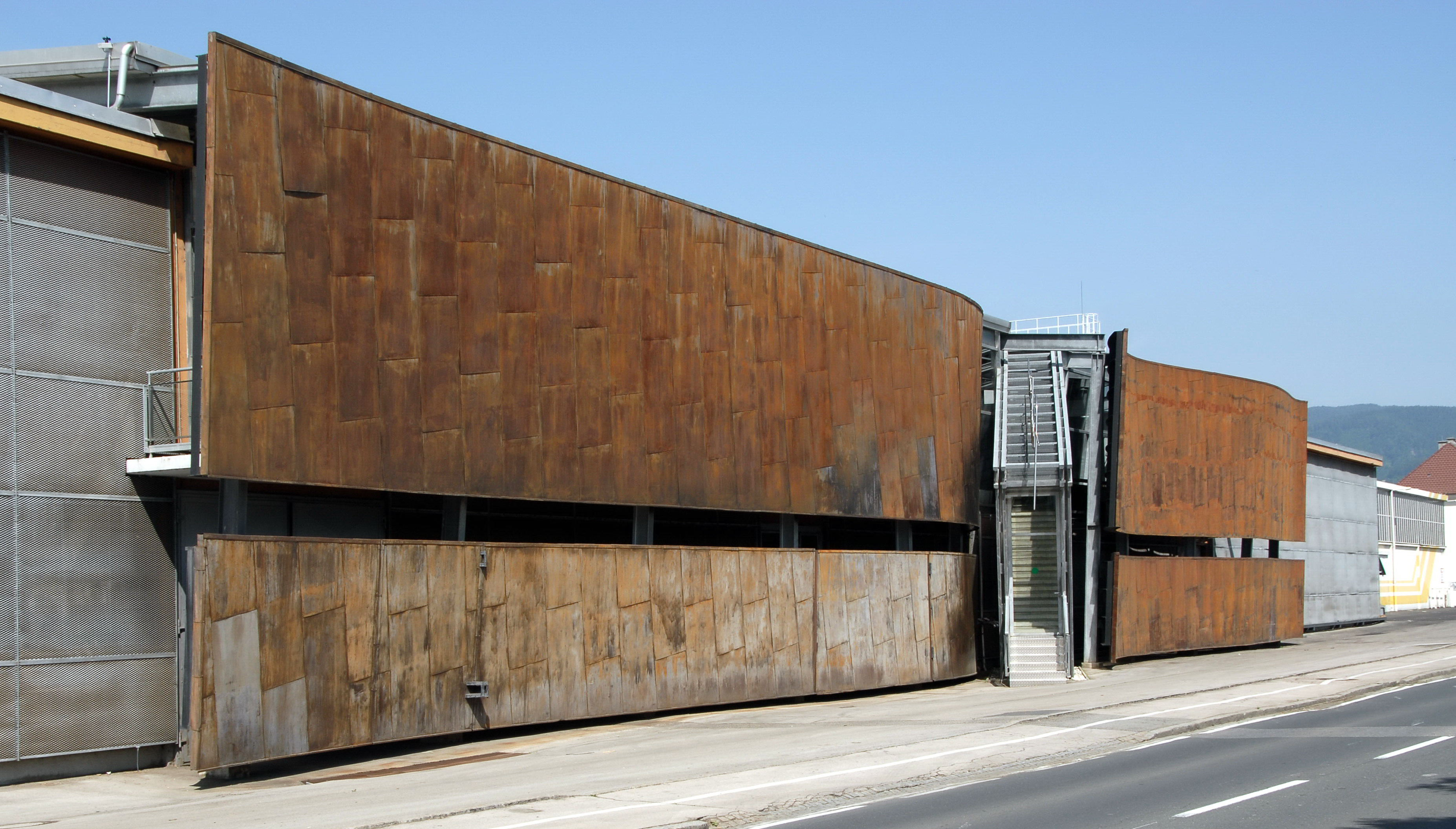
1993FunderMax Werk II (built in 1987)

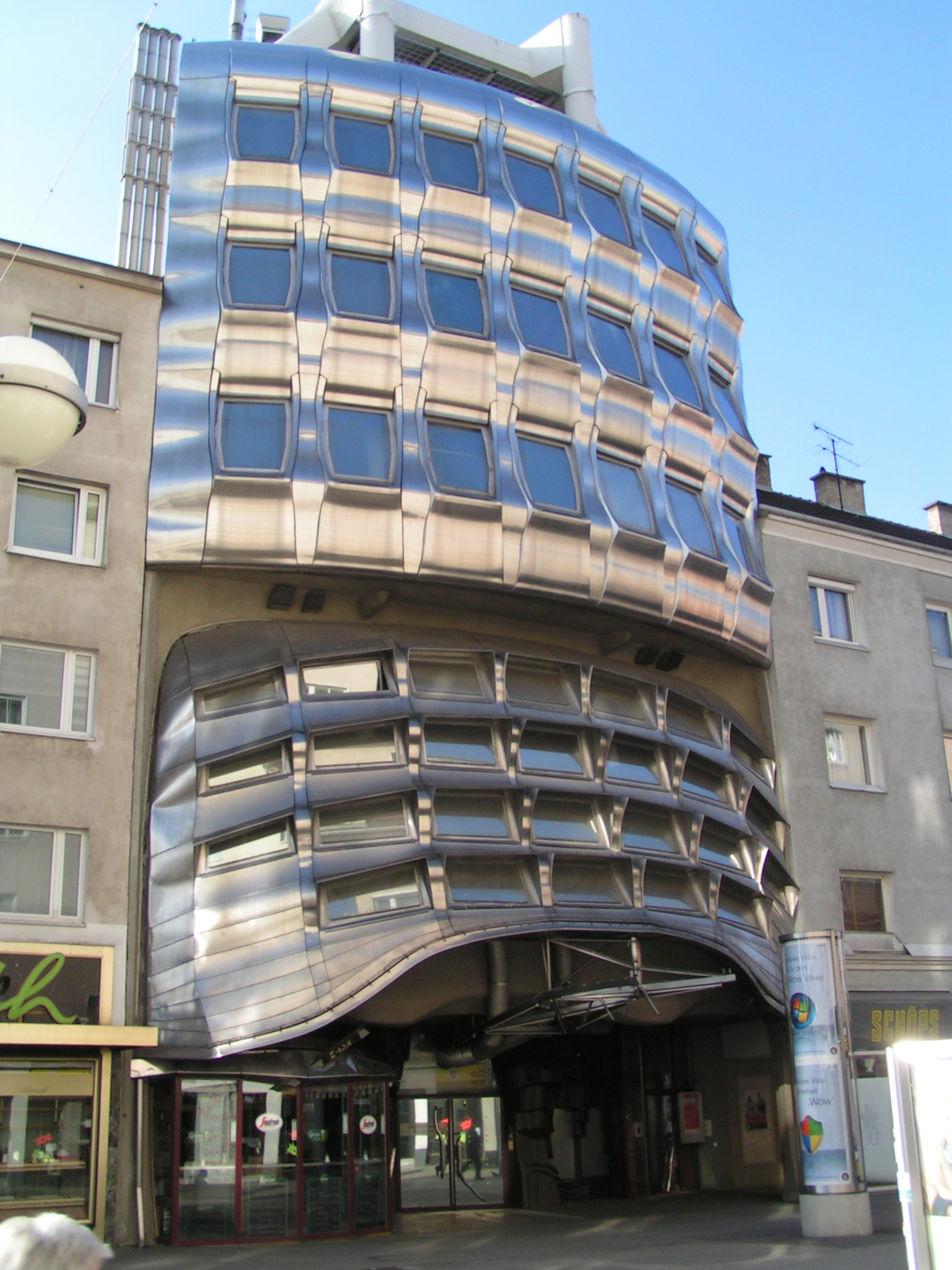
Zentralsparkasse building on Favoritenstrasse

Günther Domenig (6 July 1934 – 15 June 2012) was an Austrian architect.

Domenig was born in Klagenfurt, and studied architecture at the Graz University of Technology (1953–1959). After working as an architectural assistant, he set up in practice with Eilfried Huth (1963–1973), producing buildings in a brutalist vein. They designed buildings with exposed concrete that are among the outstanding examples of brutalism in Austria. Both the Pedagogical Academy Graz and the Oberwart Parish Church were commissioned by the Catholic Church.

Another much-noticed design from this phase is the visionary and unbuildable Stadt Ragnitz project. Here, Huth and Domenig designed a megastructure that is similar to the projects of the so-called Metabolists and Archigram's projects. At the beginning of the 1970s, Huth and Domenig increasingly designed pop-art-architecture. Their temporary buildings for the 1972 Summer Olympics in Munich were colorful and had the rounded corners and playful geometries typical of pop art. The multi-purpose hall of the Institute of the Sisters of St. Francis in Graz is reminiscent of a tortoise shell and thus is organic architecture.

Domenig's first internationally acclaimed completed work was the Z-bank in Vienna, which signalled a much more expressionistic, counter-modernist aesthetic. He is also known for his own concrete home, the Steinhaus at Lake Ossiach, on which he worked for more than 30 years. Since 2003, Günther Domenig has worked primarily with Gerhard Wallner. They founded the company Domenig & Wallner ZT GmbH.

In addition to his practice, Domenig became a professor at the Graz University of Technology in 1980. He died at the age of 77 in Graz.

== Main works ==
=== Together with Eilfried Huth ===
- 1963–68: Pedagogic Academy, Graz
- 1965–69: Parish centre, Oberwart
- 1967: Temporary pavilion for the Trigon 67 art exhibition, Graz
- 1970–72: Temporary pavilion for olympic swimming pool, Munich
- 1970–73: Temporary restaurant for the 1972 Summer Olympics, Munich
- 1973–77: Multi-purpose school hall, Graz

=== As independent architect ===
- 1974–79: Zentralsparkasse bank, Vienna
- 1980–2008: Single family home Steinhaus, Steindorf
- 1983–84: Faculty buildings Lessingstraße, Steyrergasse, Technical University Graz
- 1987: Funder Factory (Funder Werk II), St. Veit
- 1990s: Zentralsparkasse building, modernization and new facade, Vienna
- 1992–93: Mursteg bridge, Graz
- 1993–94: Center am Kai office block, Graz
- 1993–95: GIG, Office building and manufacturing halls, Völkermarkt, Carinthia
- 1993–96: RESOWI-Zentrum (university building), Karl Franzens Universität, Graz
- 1994–96: Elementary school Simonsgasse, Rosenbergstrasse, Wien-Essling
- 1998–2000: Academy of the Arts, Münster
- 1998–2001: Documentation Center Nazi Party Rally Grounds, Nuremberg
- 1999–2000: Hotel Augarten Schönaugasse, Graz
- 2002–04: T-Center (headquarters building), Vienna (with Hermann Eisenköck, Herfried Peyker)

== Decorations and awards ==
- 1967: Austrian builders award for Catholic Educational Academy in Graz (with Eilfried Huth)
- 1969: Grand Prix International d'Architecture et d'Urbanisme Cannes (with Eilfried Huth)
- 1975: Prix Europeen de la Construction Metallique
- 1981: Austrian builders prize for the Z-branch Favoriten in Vienna
- 1989: Austrian builders prize for the power plant in Frombork Unzmarkt
- 1995: Austrian builders award for the National Exhibition Carinthia: Grubenhunt und Ofensau
- 1995: Golden Medal of Honour of Vienna
- 1996: Award of Carinthia
- 1997: Austrian builders award for RESOWI centre in Graz
- 1998: Austrian builders award for the refurbishment of the City Theatre in Klagenfurt
- 2004: Grand Austrian State Prize for Architecture
- 2004: Austrian Cross of Honour for Science and Art, 1st class
- 2006: Austrian State Prize for Architecture and Austrian builders prize for the T-Center St. Marx
