= Geistthal =

- Former municipality
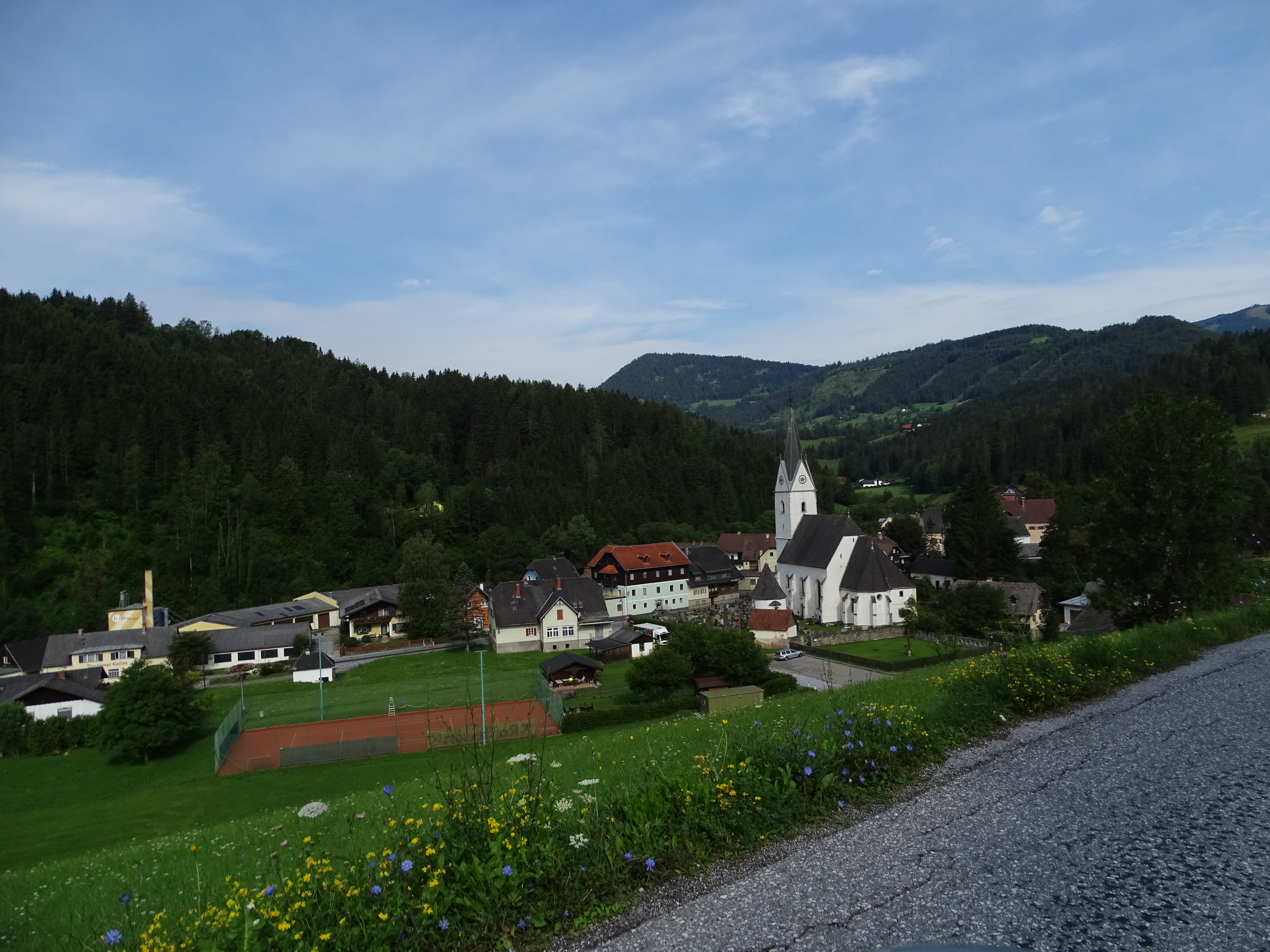

- Coat of arms

- Location within Austria
- Coordinates: 47°10′12″N 15°09′52″E
- Country: Austria
- State: Styria
- District: Voitsberg

Area
  - Total: 36.35 km^{2} (14.03 sq mi)
- Elevation: 582 m (1,909 ft)

Population (1 January 2016)
  - Total: 807
  - Density: 22.2/km^{2} (57.5/sq mi)
- Time zone: UTC+1 (CET)
  - Summer (DST): UTC+2 (CEST)
- Postal code: 8153
- Area code: 03149
- Vehicle registration: VO
- Website: www.geistthal. steiermark.at

Geistthal is a former municipality in the district of Voitsberg in the Austrian state of Styria. Since the 2015 Styria municipal structural reform, it is part of the municipality Geistthal-Södingberg.

== Geography ==
Geistthal lies about 40 km west of Graz at the foot of the Glein Alp.
