= Geistthal-Södingberg =

- Municipality
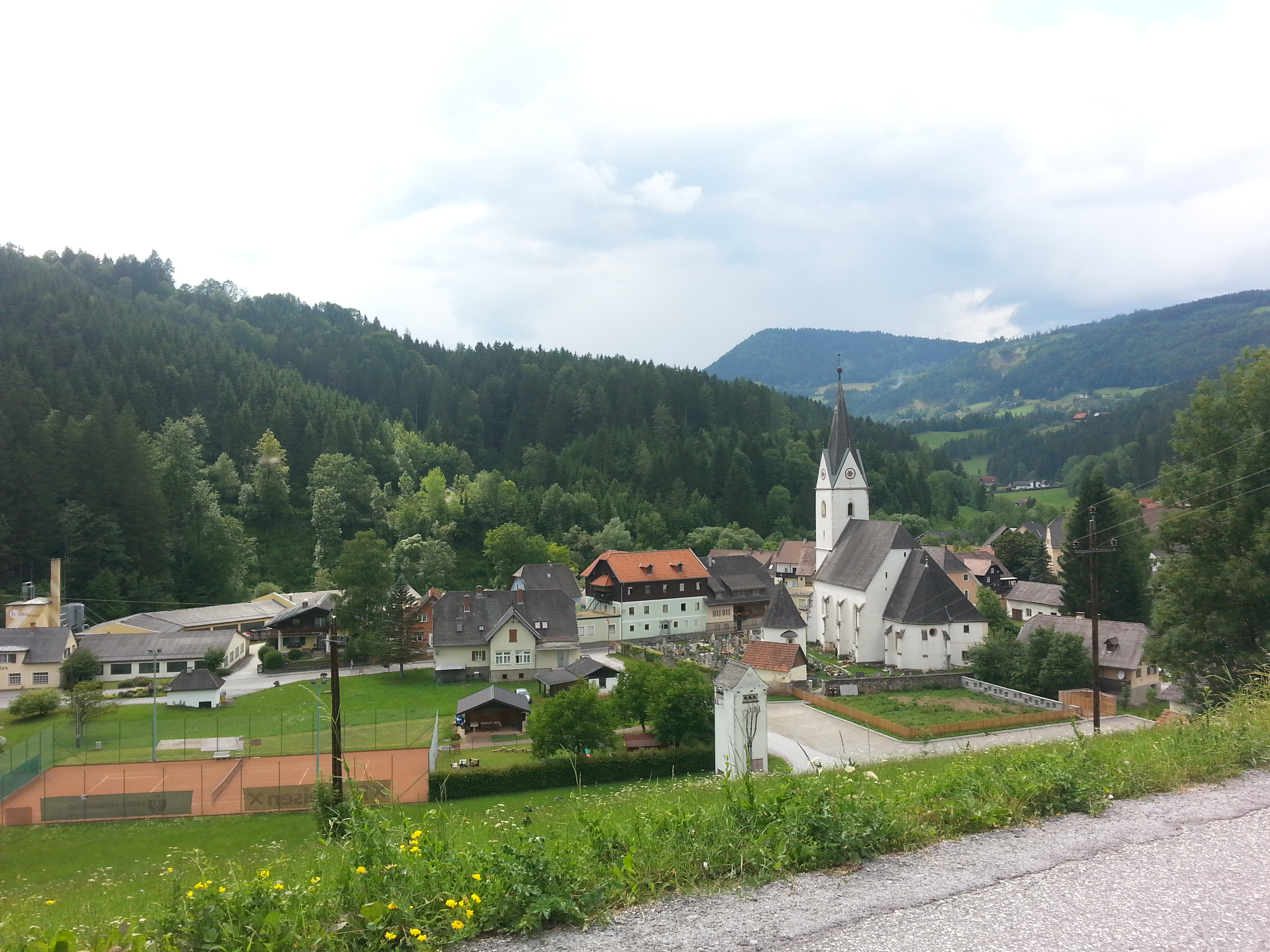
- View of Geistthal

- Location within Austria
- Coordinates: 47°06′30″N 15°10′18″E
- Country: Austria
- State: Styria
- District: Voitsberg

Government
  - Mayor: Klaudia Stroißnig (ÖVP)

Area
  - Total: 52.45 km^{2} (20.25 sq mi)

Population (2018-01-01)
  - Total: 1,532
  - Density: 29.21/km^{2} (75.65/sq mi)
- Time zone: UTC+1 (CET)
  - Summer (DST): UTC+2 (CEST)
- Postal code: 8152, 8153
- Area code: 03142, 03149
- Vehicle registration: VO

Geistthal-Södingberg is, since the beginning of 2015, a municipality within Voitsberg, Styria. The municipality of Geistthal-Södingberg was created as part of the Steiermärkische Gemeindestrukturreform (Styrian Area Structure Reform) in Styria, which combined Geistthal and Södingberg.

== Geography ==
=== Communities ===
The municipal area includes the following five localities (population from January 2015 in parentheses):

- Eggartsberg (297)
- Geistthal (262)
- Kleinalpe (109)
- Södingberg (816)
- Sonnleiten (133)

The district has an area of 52.59 km² and comprises the four Cadastral communities of Eggartsberg, Geistthal, Kleinalpe Södingberg and Sonnleiten.

== Historical landmarks ==
The area of Södingberg in Landesaufnahmen in the period between 1789 and 1910

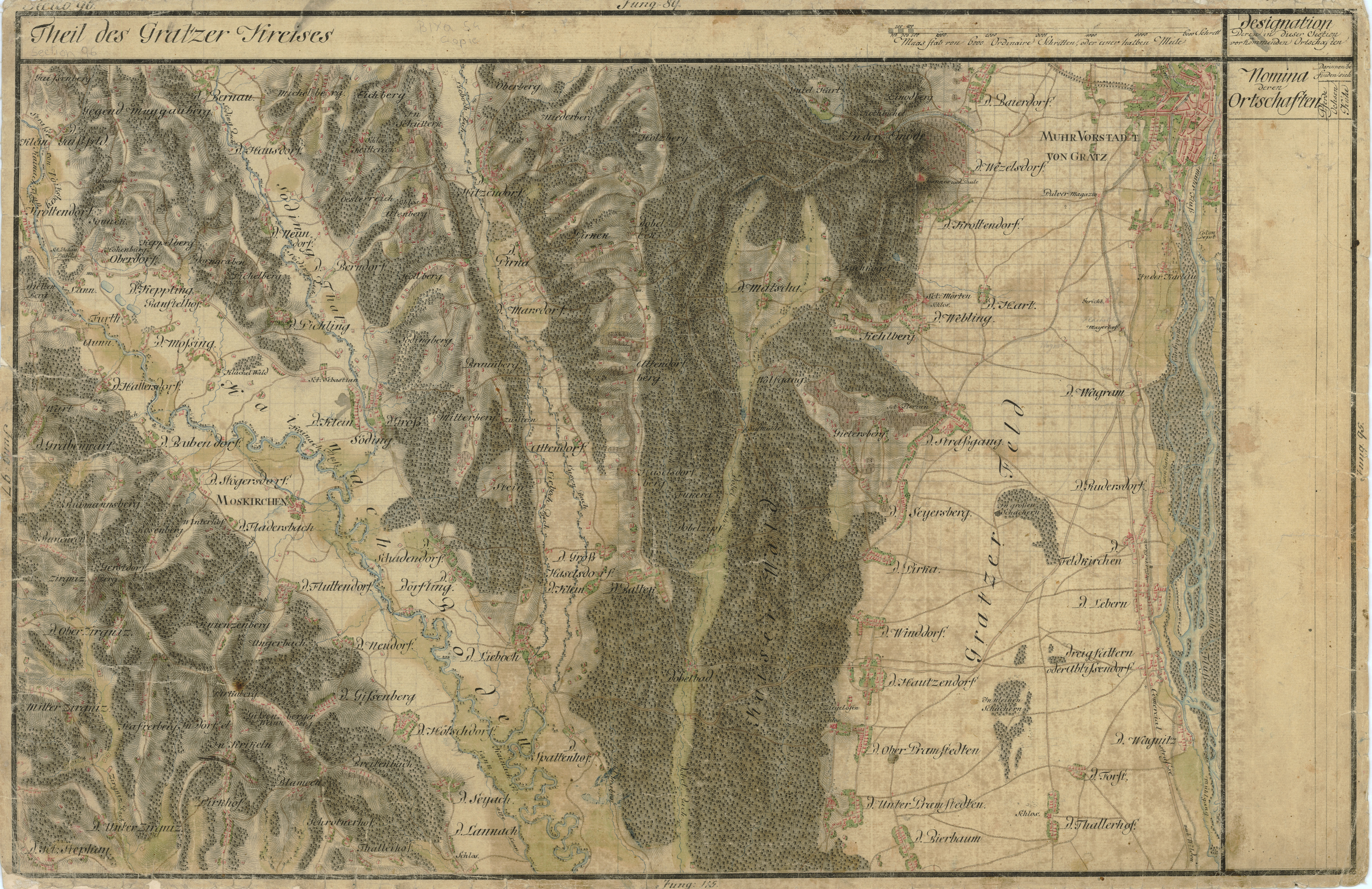
Södingberg in the Josephinian Land Survey 1790

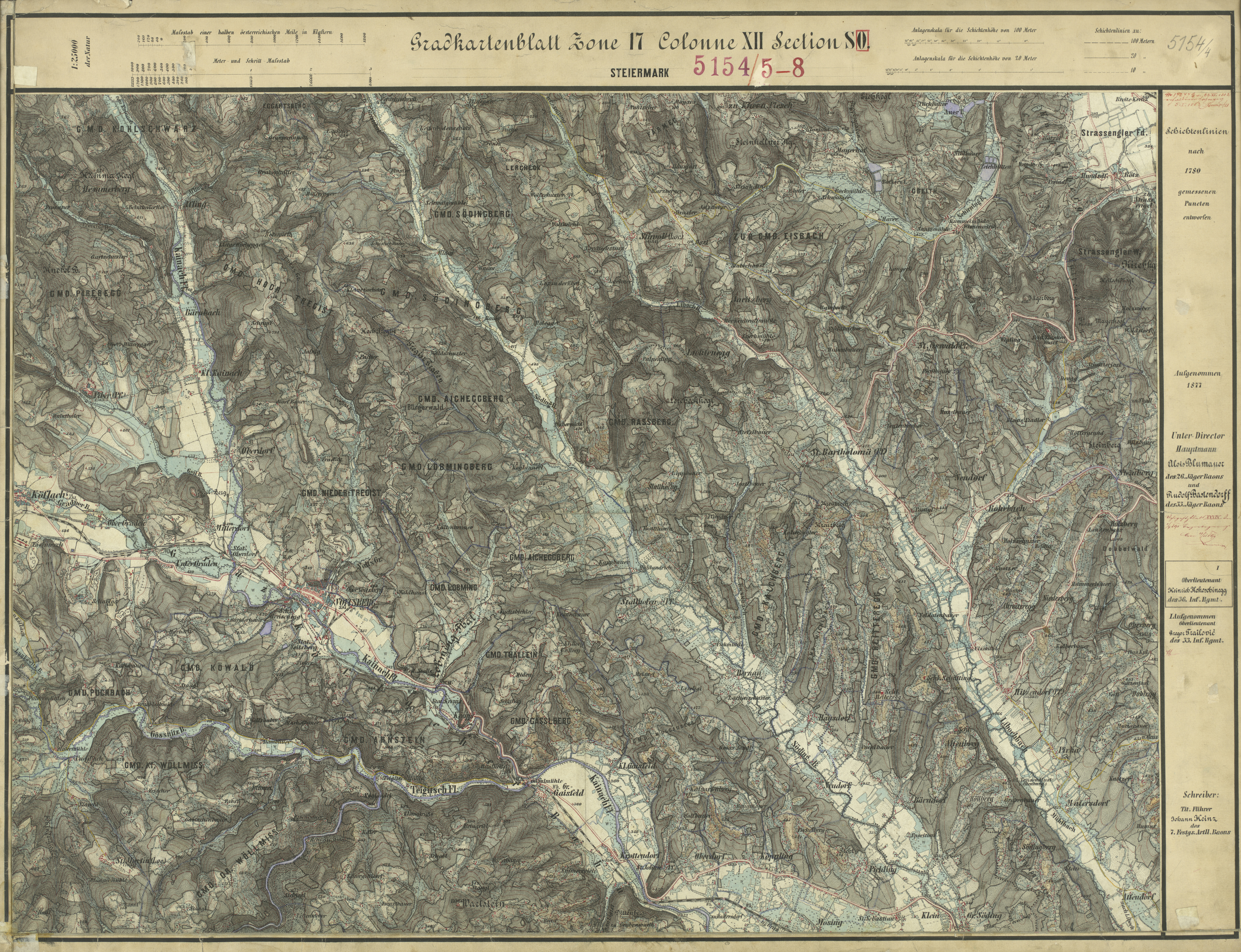
Södingberg am Nordrand des Kainachtals, Aufnahmeblatt der Landesaufnahme um 1878

== Literature ==
- Ernst Lasnik: Södingberg. Porträt einer Landschaft. Södingberg 2009
