= Södingberg =

- Former municipality
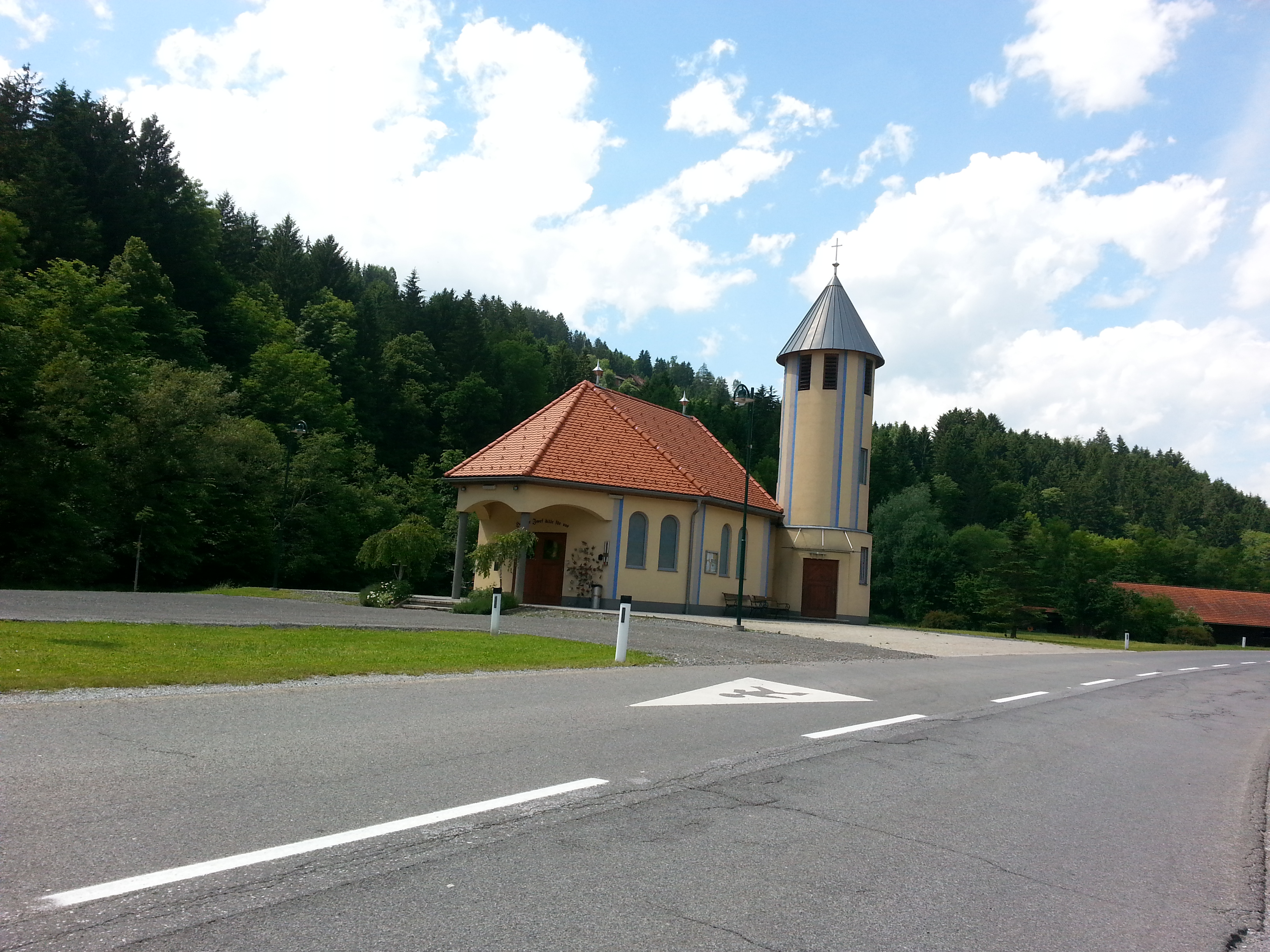
- Chapel in Södingberg

- Coat of arms

- Location within Austria
- Coordinates: 47°06′30″N 15°10′18″E
- Country: Austria
- State: Styria
- District: Voitsberg

Area
  - Total: 16.06 km^{2} (6.20 sq mi)

Population (1 January 2016)
  - Total: 823
  - Density: 51.2/km^{2} (133/sq mi)
- Time zone: UTC+1 (CET)
  - Summer (DST): UTC+2 (CEST)
- Postal code: 8152
- Area code: 03142
- Vehicle registration: VO
- Website: www.soedingberg. steiermark.at

Södingberg is a former municipality in the district of Voitsberg in the Austrian state of Styria. Since the 2015 Styria municipal structural reform, it is part of the municipality Geistthal-Södingberg.

== Geography ==
Södingberg lies west of Graz.
