= Wernersdorf =

- Former municipality
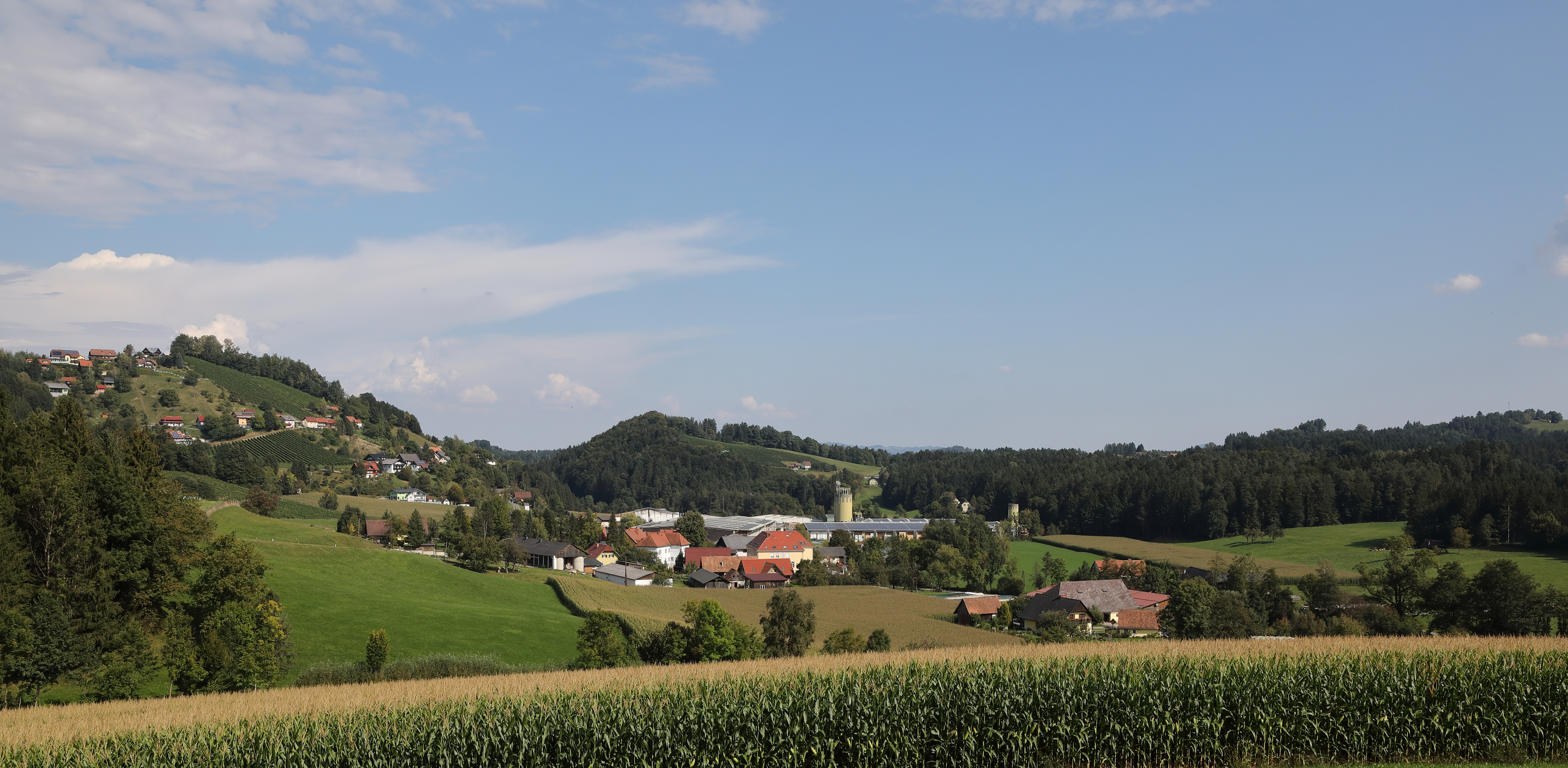
- Wernersdorf

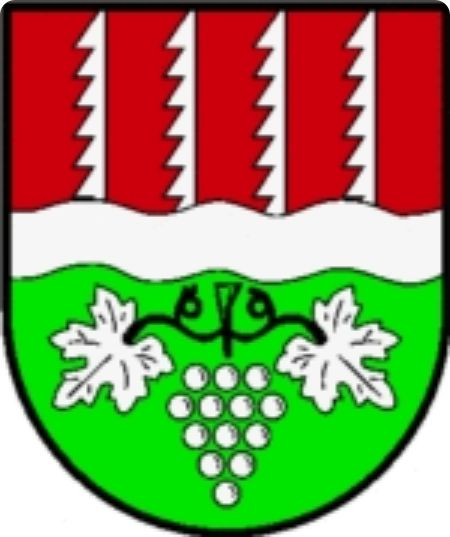
- Coat of arms

- Location within Austria
- Coordinates: 46°42′57″N 15°12′24″E
- Country: Austria
- State: Styria
- District: Deutschlandsberg

Area
  - Total: 9.97 km^{2} (3.85 sq mi)
- Elevation: 382–864 m (1,253–2,835 ft)

Population (1 January 2016)
  - Total: 634
  - Density: 63.6/km^{2} (165/sq mi)
- Time zone: UTC+1 (CET)
  - Summer (DST): UTC+2 (CEST)
- Postal code: 8551
- Area code: 03466
- Vehicle registration: DL
- Website: www.wernersdorf. steiermark.at

Wernersdorf is a former municipality in the district of Deutschlandsberg in the Austrian state of Styria. Since the 2015 Styria municipal structural reform, it is part of the municipality Wies.

== Population ==
Historical population
| Year | Pop. | ±% |
|---|---|---|
| 1869 | 774 | — |
| 1880 | 737 | −4.8% |
| 1890 | 755 | +2.4% |
| 1900 | 691 | −8.5% |
| 1910 | 698 | +1.0% |
| 1923 | 747 | +7.0% |
| 1934 | 796 | +6.6% |
| 1939 | 720 | −9.5% |
| 1951 | 826 | +14.7% |
| 1961 | 856 | +3.6% |
| 1971 | 820 | −4.2% |
| 1981 | 820 | +0.0% |
| 1991 | 711 | −13.3% |
| 2001 | 673 | −5.3% |
| 2011 | 654 | −2.8% |
