= Limberg bei Wies =

- Former municipality
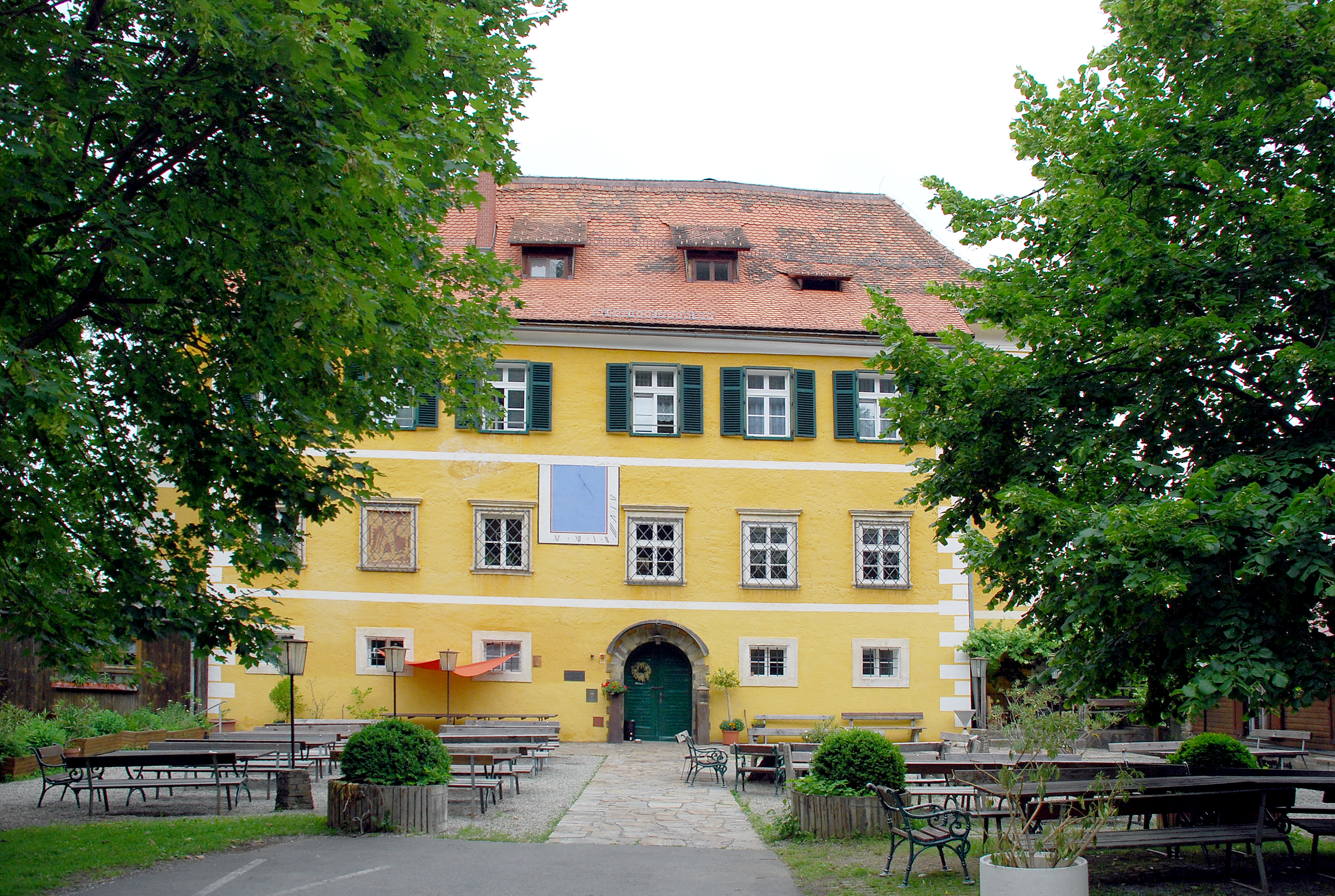
- Limberg Castle

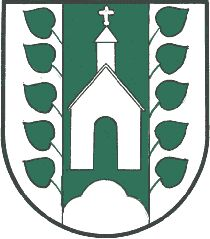
- Coat of arms

- Location within Austria
- Coordinates: 46°44′00″N 15°14′00″E
- Country: Austria
- State: Styria
- District: Deutschlandsberg

Area
  - Total: 7.67 km^{2} (2.96 sq mi)
- Elevation: 460 m (1,510 ft)

Population (1 January 2016)
  - Total: 950
  - Density: 120/km^{2} (320/sq mi)
- Time zone: UTC+1 (CET)
  - Summer (DST): UTC+2 (CEST)
- Postal code: 8541, 8542, 8551
- Area code: 3465
- Vehicle registration: DL
- Website: www.limberg-wies.com

Limberg bei Wies is a former municipality in the district of Deutschlandsberg in the Austrian state of Styria. Since the 2015 Styria municipal structural reform, it is part of the municipality Wies.

== Population ==
Historical population
Year	Pop.	±%
1869	794	—
1880	1,170	+47.4%
1890	1,321	+12.9%
1900	1,387	+5.0%
1910	1,298	−6.4%
1923	1,547	+19.2%
1934	1,340	−13.4%
1939	1,171	−12.6%
1951	1,397	+19.3%
1961	1,199	−14.2%
1971	1,041	−13.2%
1981	926	−11.0%
1991	944	+1.9%
2001	946	+0.2%
2011	929	−1.8%
