= Sulmeck-Greith =

- Former municipality
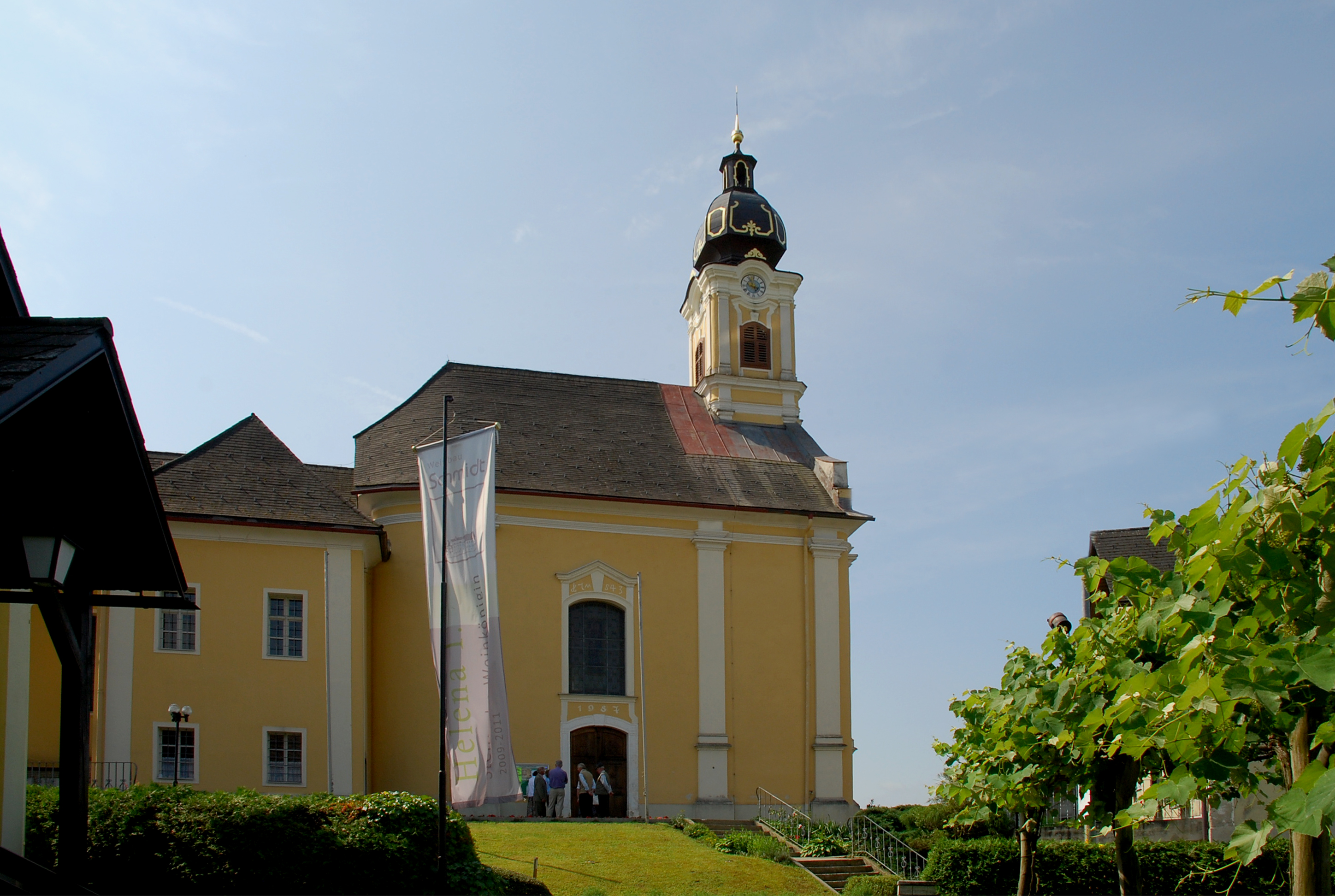
- Parish church in Greith

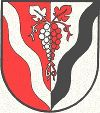
- Coat of arms

- Location within Austria
- Coordinates: 46°44′00″N 15°19′00″E
- Country: Austria
- State: Styria
- District: Deutschlandsberg

Area
  - Total: 18.62 km^{2} (7.19 sq mi)
- Elevation: 320 m (1,050 ft)

Population (1 January 2016)
  - Total: 1,318
  - Density: 70.78/km^{2} (183.3/sq mi)
- Time zone: UTC+1 (CET)
  - Summer (DST): UTC+2 (CEST)
- Postal code: 8443, 8543, 8544
- Area code: 3465
- Vehicle registration: DL
- Website: www.sulmeck-greith.at

Sulmeck-Greith is a former municipality in the district of Deutschlandsberg in the Austrian state of Styria. Since the 2015 Styria municipal structural reform, it is part of the municipality Sankt Martin im Sulmtal.

== Population ==
Historical population
Year	Pop.	±%
1869	1,432	—
1880	1,491	+4.1%
1890	1,497	+0.4%
1900	1,490	−0.5%
1910	1,396	−6.3%
1923	1,590	+13.9%
1934	1,537	−3.3%
1939	1,396	−9.2%
1951	1,491	+6.8%
1961	1,510	+1.3%
1971	1,510	+0.0%
1981	1,510	+0.0%
1991	1,545	+2.3%
2001	1,507	−2.5%
2011	1,367	−9.3%
