= Greisdorf =

- Former municipality
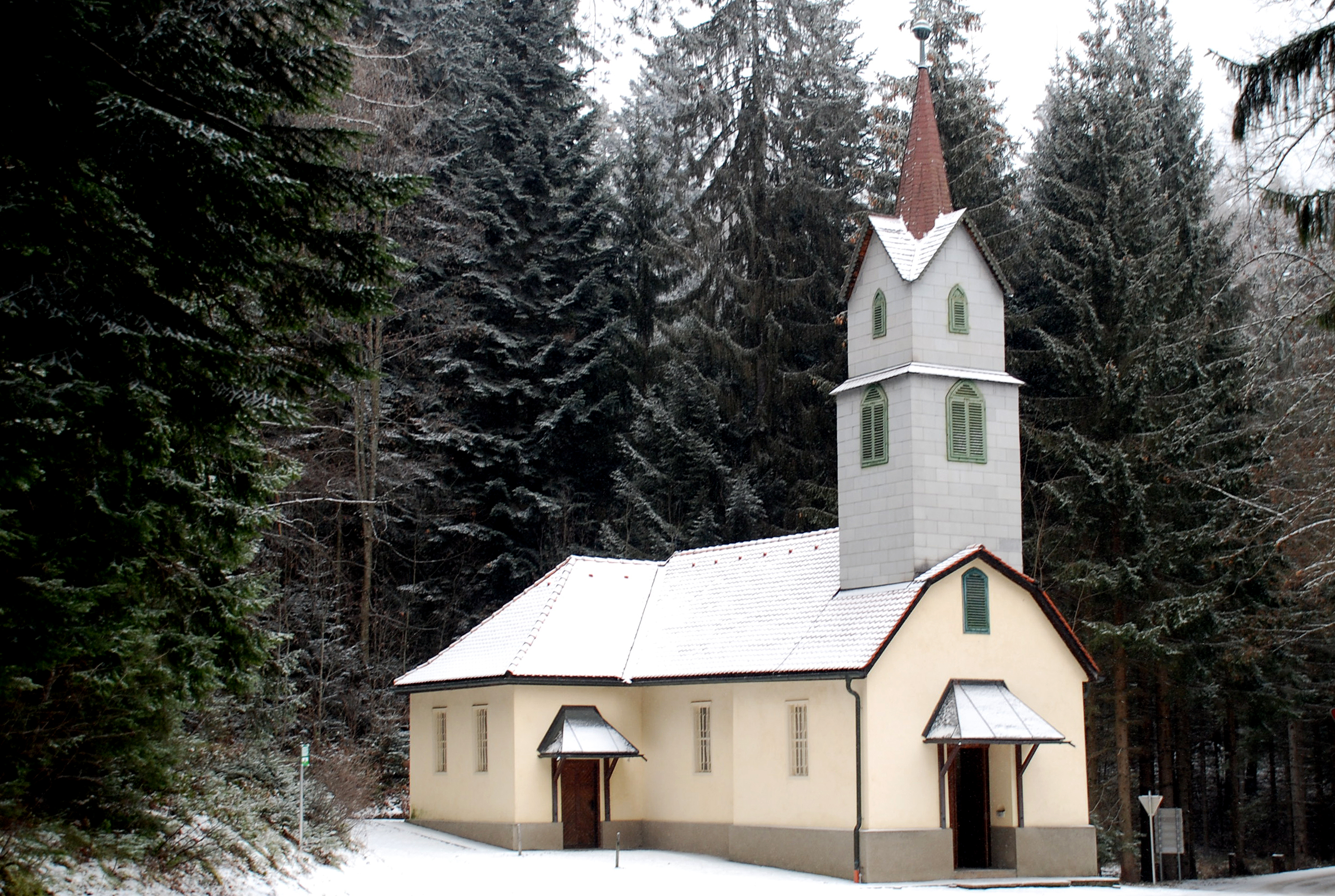
- Greisdorf chapel

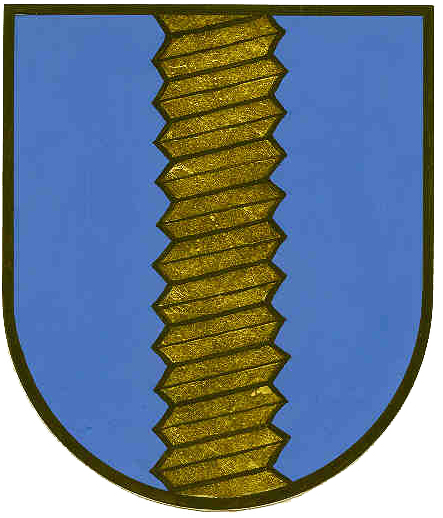
- Coat of arms

- Location within Austria
- Coordinates: 46°55′28″N 15°13′31″E
- Country: Austria
- State: Styria
- District: Deutschlandsberg

Area
  - Total: 26.32 km^{2} (10.16 sq mi)
- Elevation: 580 m (1,900 ft)

Population (1 January 2016)
  - Total: 966
  - Density: 36.7/km^{2} (95.1/sq mi)
- Time zone: UTC+1 (CET)
  - Summer (DST): UTC+2 (CEST)
- Postal code: 8511
- Area code: 3463
- Vehicle registration: DL
- Website: www.greisdorf.at

Greisdorf is a former municipality in the district of Deutschlandsberg in the Austrian state of Styria. Since the 2015 Styria municipal structural reform, it is part of the municipality Sankt Stefan ob Stainz.

== Population ==
Historical population
Year	Pop.	±%
1869	1,310	—
1880	1,249	−4.7%
1890	1,300	+4.1%
1900	1,252	−3.7%
1910	1,204	−3.8%
1923	1,151	−4.4%
1934	1,280	+11.2%
1939	1,110	−13.3%
1951	1,122	+1.1%
1961	1,068	−4.8%
1971	1,115	+4.4%
1981	1,086	−2.6%
1991	1,012	−6.8%
2001	1,055	+4.2%
2011	1,027	−2.7%
