= Gundersdorf =

- Former municipality
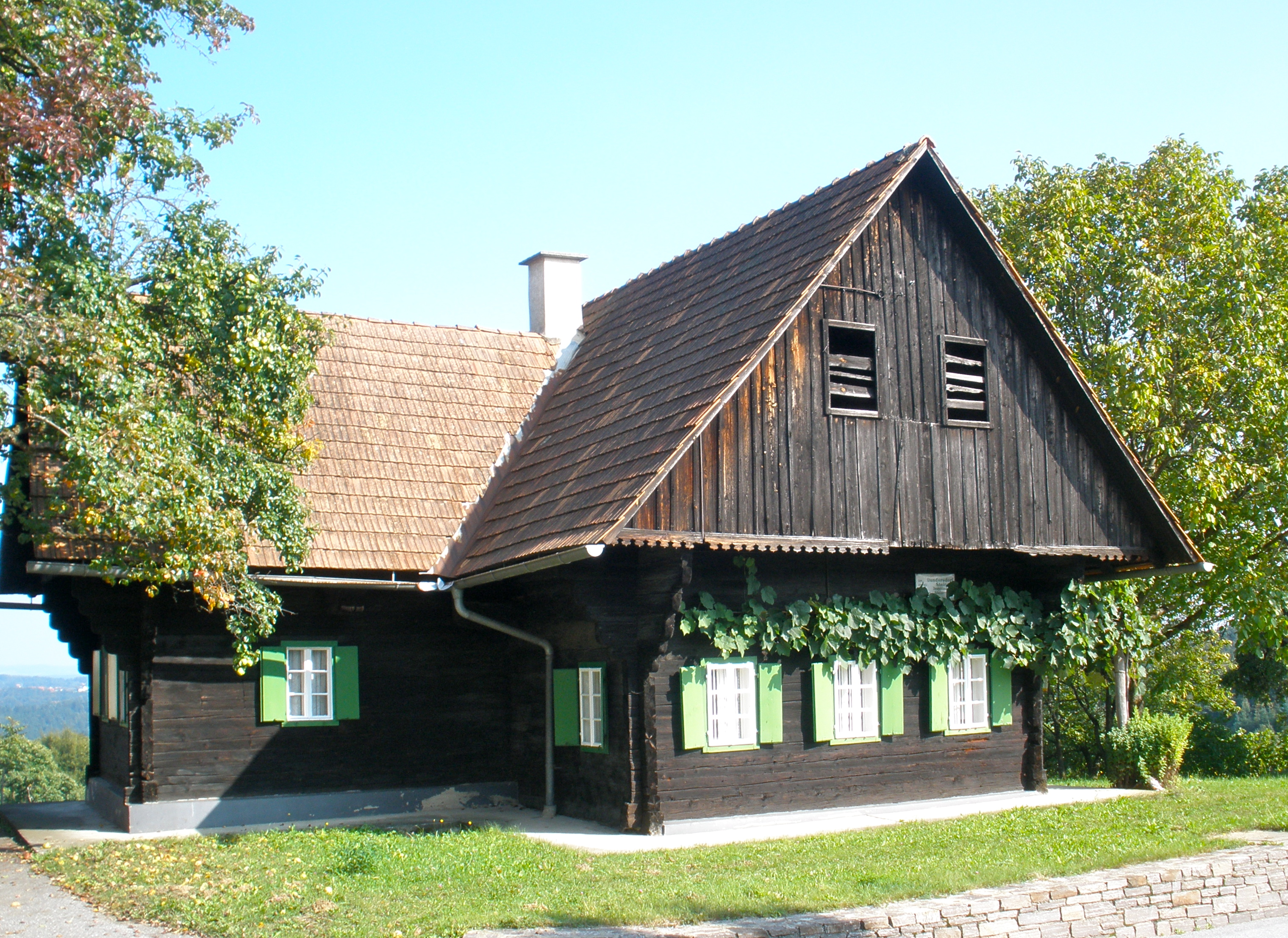
- A house in the Schilcher-Weinstraße in Gundersdorf

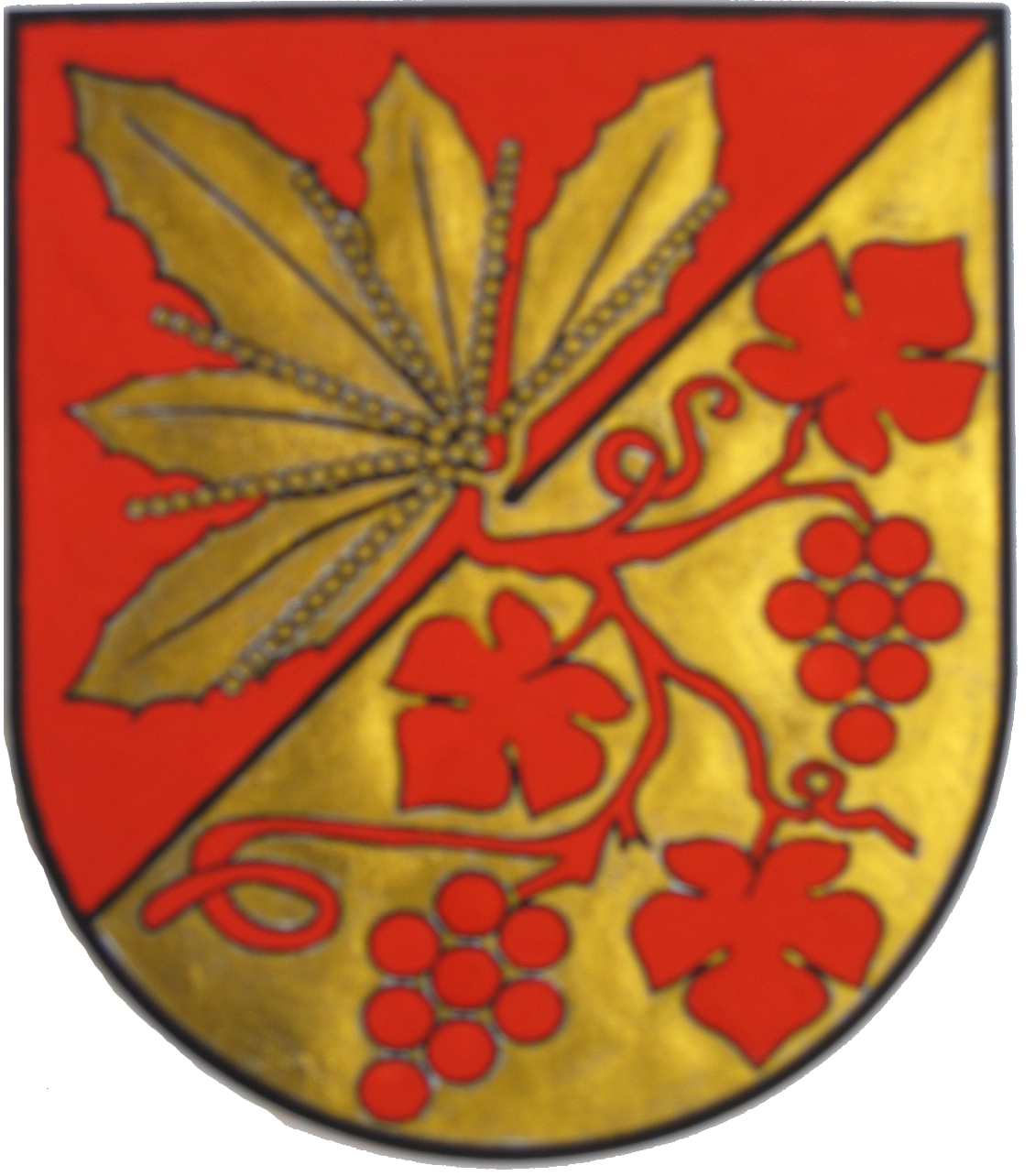
- Coat of arms

- Location within Austria
- Coordinates: 46°56′52″N 15°14′02″E
- Country: Austria
- State: Styria
- District: Deutschlandsberg

Area
  - Total: 5.69 km^{2} (2.20 sq mi)
- Elevation: 492 m (1,614 ft)

Population (1 January 2016)
  - Total: 406
  - Density: 71.4/km^{2} (185/sq mi)
- Time zone: UTC+1 (CET)
  - Summer (DST): UTC+2 (CEST)
- Postal code: 8511
- Area code: 3463
- Vehicle registration: DL
- Website: www.gundersdorf.at

Gundersdorf is a former municipality in the district of Deutschlandsberg in the Austrian state of Styria. Since the 2015 Styria municipal structural reform, it is part of the municipality Sankt Stefan ob Stainz.

== Population ==
Historical population
Year	Pop.	±%
1869	446	—
1880	445	−0.2%
1890	442	−0.7%
1900	434	−1.8%
1910	459	+5.8%
1923	426	−7.2%
1934	483	+13.4%
1939	482	−0.2%
1951	447	−7.3%
1961	430	−3.8%
1971	444	+3.3%
1981	406	−8.6%
1991	404	−0.5%
2001	387	−4.2%
2011	416	+7.5%
