= Wielfresen =

- Former municipality
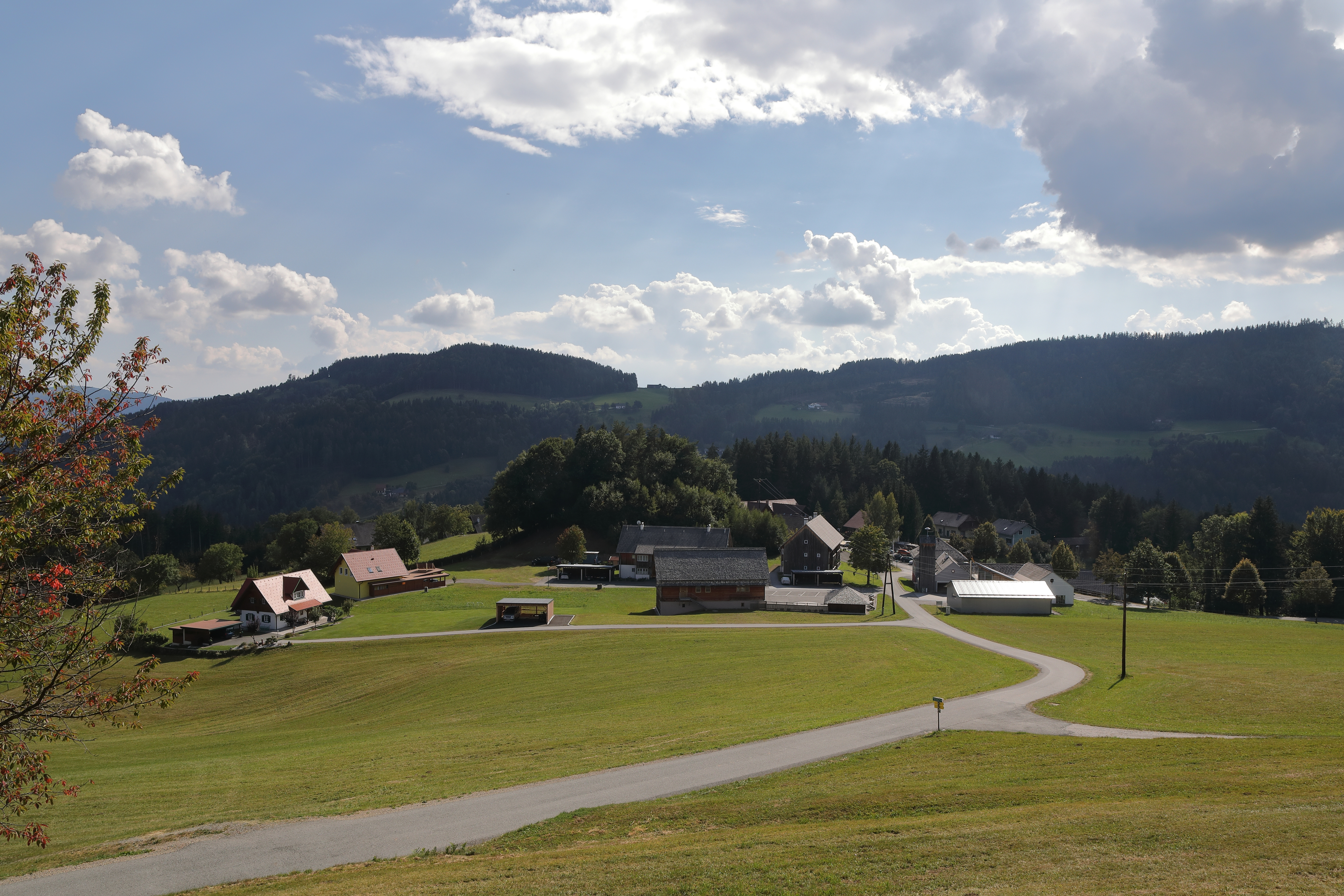
- Wielfresen

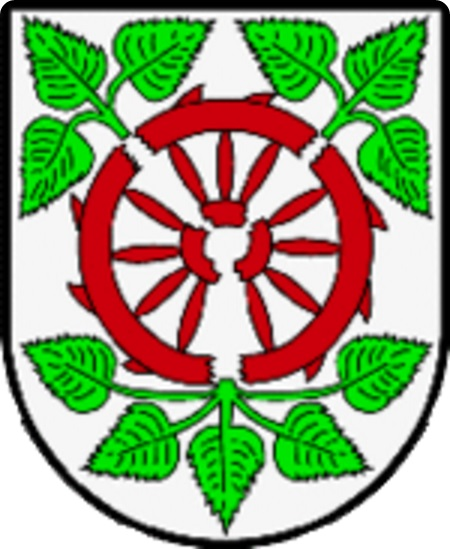
- Coat of arms

- Location within Austria
- Coordinates: 46°43′32″N 15°10′25″E
- Country: Austria
- State: Styria
- District: Deutschlandsberg

Area
  - Total: 43.84 km^{2} (16.93 sq mi)
- Elevation: 620 m (2,030 ft)

Population (1 January 2016)
  - Total: 577
  - Density: 13.2/km^{2} (34.1/sq mi)
- Time zone: UTC+1 (CET)
  - Summer (DST): UTC+2 (CEST)
- Postal code: 8541
- Area code: 03468
- Vehicle registration: DL
- Website: www.wielfresen. steiermark.at

Wielfresen is a former municipality in the district of Deutschlandsberg in the Austrian state of Styria. Since the 2015 Styria municipal structural reform, it is part of the municipality Wies.

== Population ==
Historical population
Year	Pop.	±%
1869	1,104	—
1880	1,101	−0.3%
1890	1,059	−3.8%
1900	1,023	−3.4%
1910	963	−5.9%
1923	964	+0.1%
1934	1,008	+4.6%
1939	995	−1.3%
1951	983	−1.2%
1961	960	−2.3%
1971	923	−3.9%
1981	852	−7.7%
1991	791	−7.2%
2001	698	−11.8%
2011	594	−14.9%
