= Sankt Josef =

- Municipality
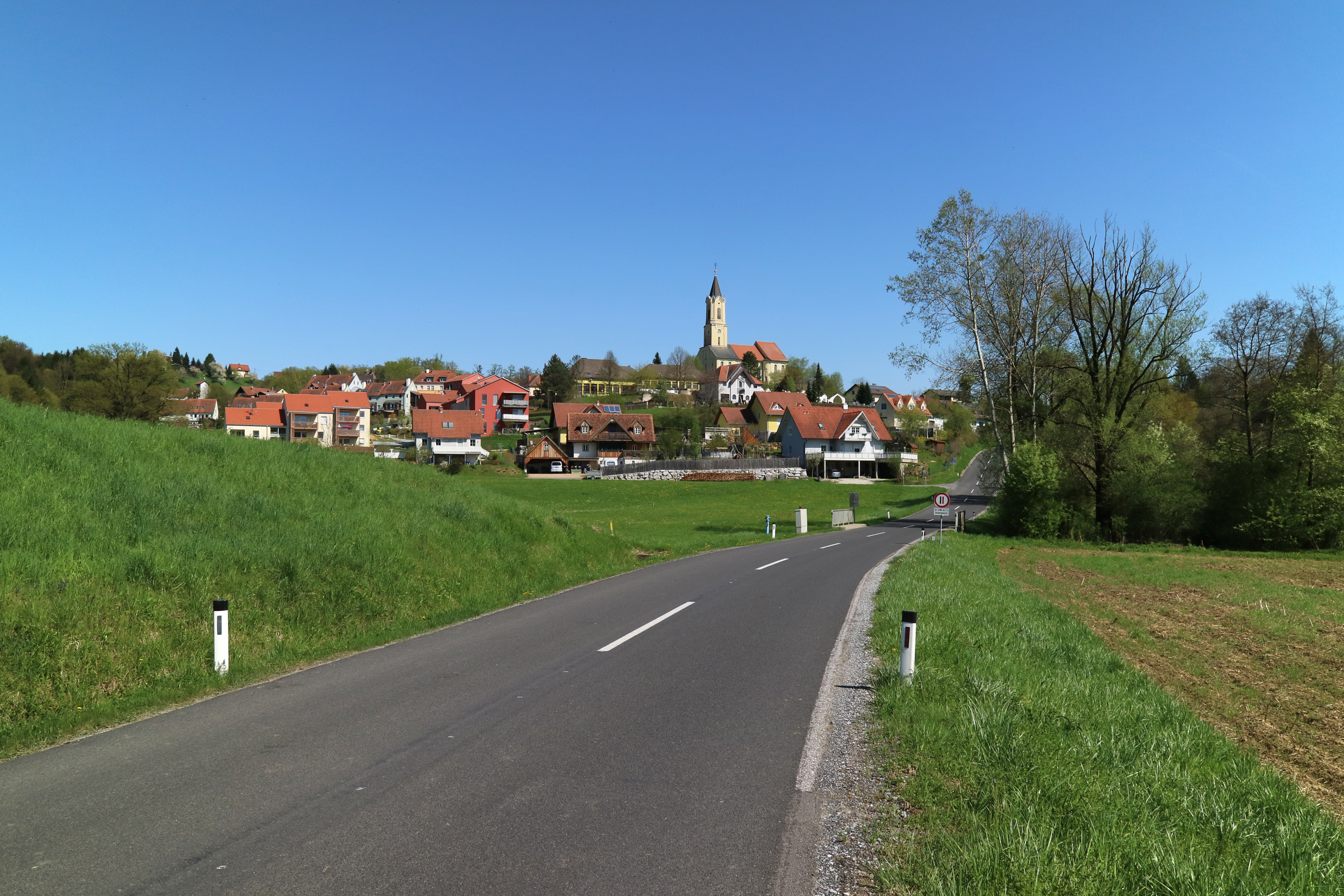
- Sankt Josef seen from the west

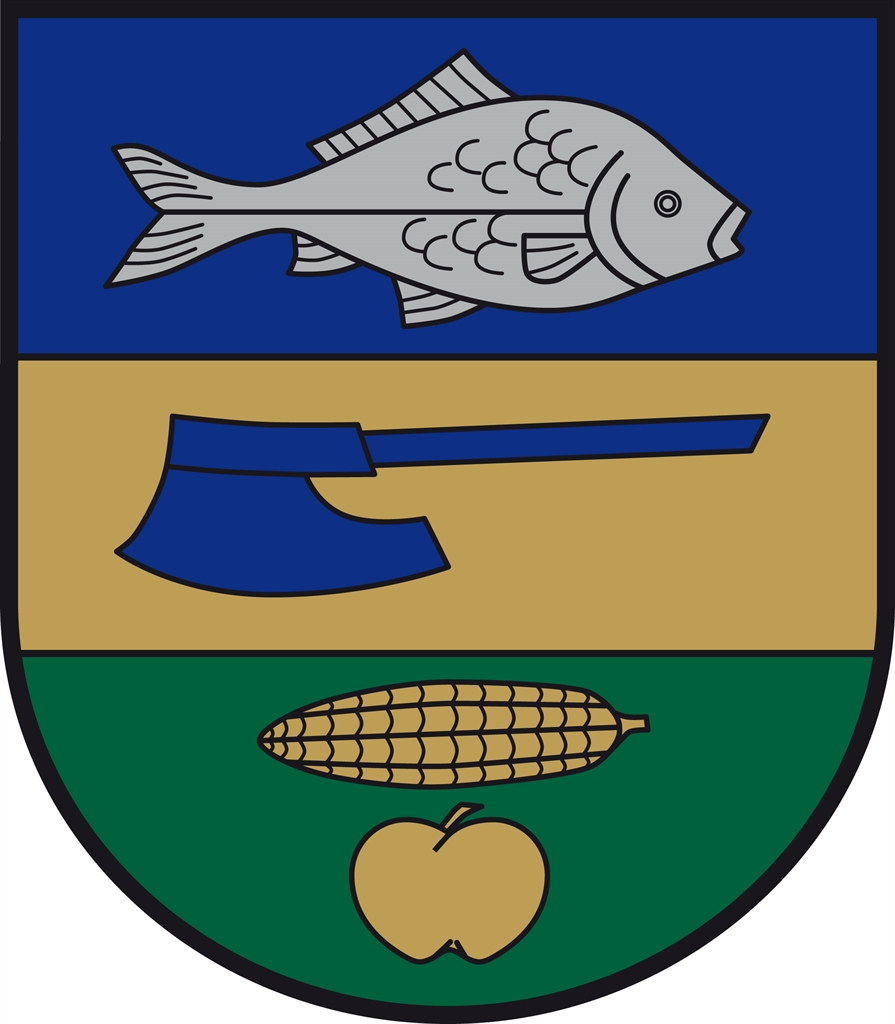
- Coat of arms

- Location within Austria
- Coordinates: 46°54′37″N 15°20′13″E
- Country: Austria
- State: Styria
- District: Deutschlandsberg

Government
  - Mayor: Franz Lindschinger (ÖVP)

Area
  - Total: 13.3 km^{2} (5.1 sq mi)
- Elevation: 423 m (1,388 ft)

Population (2018-01-01)
  - Total: 1,601
  - Density: 120/km^{2} (312/sq mi)
- Time zone: UTC+1 (CET)
  - Summer (DST): UTC+2 (CEST)
- Postal code: 8503
- Area code: 03136
- Vehicle registration: DL
- Website: www.st-josef. steiermark.at/

Sankt Josef (Austrian German for Saint Joseph) is a municipality in the district of Deutschlandsberg in Styria, southeast Austria.

== Population ==
Historical population
Year	Pop.	±%
1869	1,215	—
1880	1,313	+8.1%
1890	1,317	+0.3%
1900	1,268	−3.7%
1910	1,226	−3.3%
1923	1,295	+5.6%
1934	1,263	−2.5%
1939	1,141	−9.7%
1951	1,189	+4.2%
1961	1,062	−10.7%
1971	1,136	+7.0%
1981	1,161	+2.2%
1991	1,176	+1.3%
2001	1,337	+13.7%
2011	1,353	+1.2%
