= Aibl =

- Former municipality
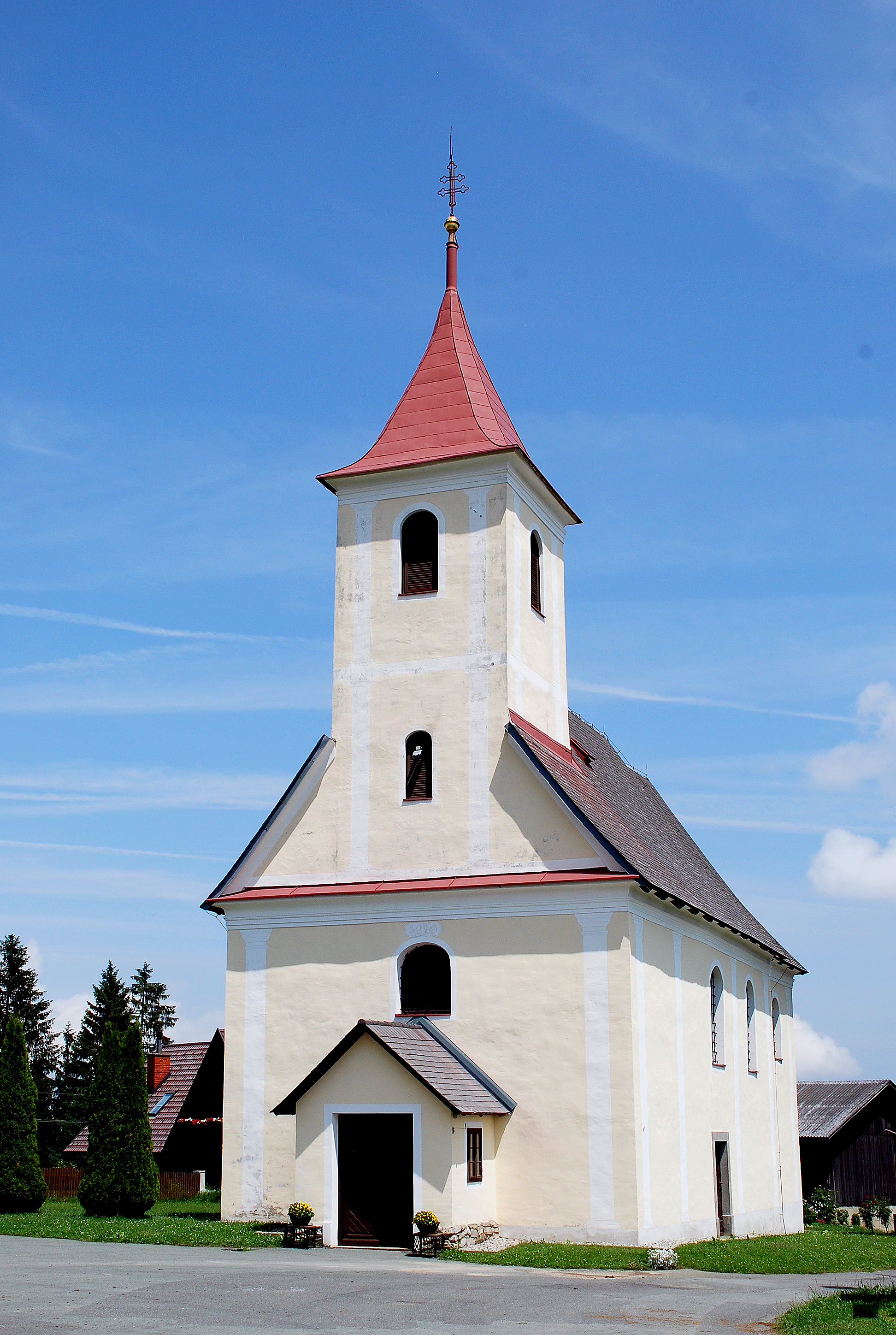
- St. Lorenzen church in Aibl

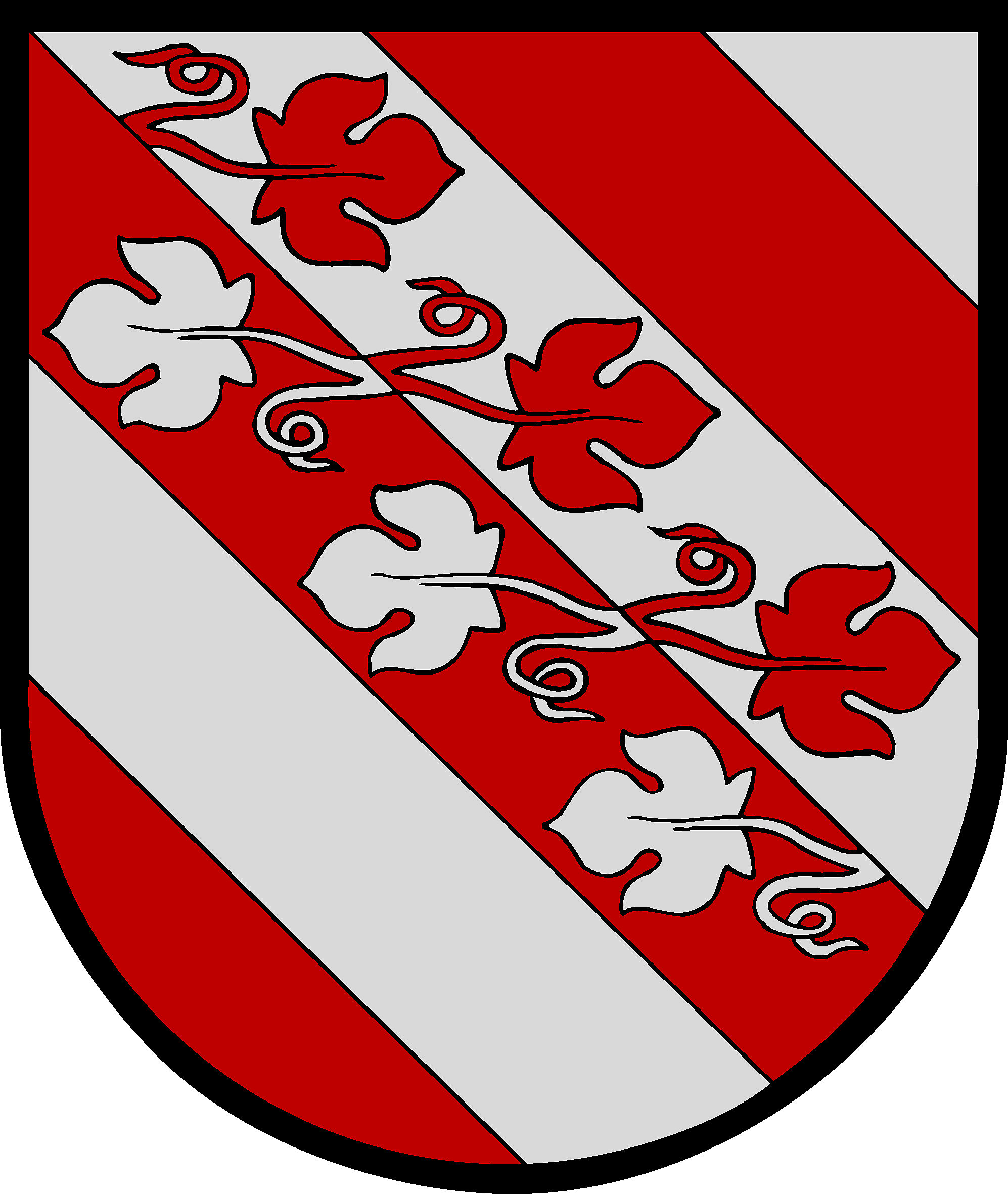
- Coat of arms

- Location within Austria
- Coordinates: 46°41′00″N 15°13′00″E
- Country: Austria
- State: Styria
- District: Deutschlandsberg

Area
  - Total: 40.7 km^{2} (15.7 sq mi)
- Elevation: 470 m (1,540 ft)

Population (2014-01-01)
  - Total: 1,386
  - Density: 34.1/km^{2} (88.2/sq mi)
- Time zone: UTC+1 (CET)
  - Summer (DST): UTC+2 (CEST)
- Postal code: 8552
- Area code: 0 34 66
- Vehicle registration: DL
- Website: www.aibl.gv.at

Aibl was a municipality in Austria which merged in January 2015 into Eibiswald in the Deutschlandsberg District in the Austrian state of Styria.

== Population ==
Historical population
Year	Pop.	±%
1869	2,093	—
1880	2,333	+11.5%
1890	2,618	+12.2%
1900	2,418	−7.6%
1910	2,251	−6.9%
1923	2,119	−5.9%
1934	2,169	+2.4%
1939	1,996	−8.0%
1951	2,190	+9.7%
1961	2,070	−5.5%
1971	1,817	−12.2%
1981	1,636	−10.0%
1991	1,635	−0.1%
2001	1,521	−7.0%
2011	1,433	−5.8%
2014	1,386	−3.3%
