= Deutschlandsberg District =

Deutschlandsberg District Bezirk Deutschlandsberg
- District
- Coordinates: 46.823°N 15.250°E
- Country: Austria
- State: Styria
- Number of municipalities: 15
- Administrative seat: Deutschlandsberg

Government
  - District Governor: Doris Bund

Area
  - Total: 863.5 km^{2} (333.4 sq mi)

Population (2001)
  - Total: 61,498
  - Density: 71.22/km^{2} (184.5/sq mi)
- Time zone: UTC+01:00 (CET)
  - Summer (DST): UTC+02:00 (CEST)
- Vehicle registration: DL
- NUTS code: AT225

Bezirk Deutschlandsberg (German: [dɔʏtʃˈlantsbɛʁk]) is a district of the state of Styria in Austria. Since the 2015 Styria municipal structural reform, it consists of the following municipalities:

- Deutschlandsberg
- Eibiswald
- Frauental an der Laßnitz
- Groß Sankt Florian
- Lannach
- Pölfing-Brunn
- Preding
- Sankt Josef
- Sankt Martin im Sulmtal
- Sankt Peter im Sulmtal
- Sankt Stefan ob Stainz
- Schwanberg
- Stainz
- Wettmannstätten
- Wies

== Municipalities before 2015 ==
Towns (Städte) are indicated in boldface; market towns (Marktgemeinden) in italics; suburbs, hamlets and other subdivisions of a municipality are indicated in small characters.

- Aibl
  - Aichberg, Hadernigg, Rothwein, Sankt Bartlmä, Sankt Lorenzen, Staritsch
- Bad Gams
  - Bergegg, Feldbaum, Sallegg, Furth, Gersdorf, Greim, Hohenfeld, Mitteregg, Müllegg, Niedergams, Vochera am Weinberg
- Deutschlandsberg
- Eibiswald
- Frauental an der Laßnitz
  - Freidorf an der Laßnitz, Freidorfer Gleinz, Laßnitz, Schamberg, Zeierling
- Freiland bei Deutschlandsberg
- Garanas
  - Oberfresen
- Georgsberg
  - Ettendorf bei Stainz, Pichling bei Stainz, Rossegg
- Greisdorf
  - Sommereben, Steinreib, Wald in der Weststeiermark
- Gressenberg
- Groß Sankt Florian
  - Grünau an der Laßnitz, Gussendorf, Kraubath in der Weststeiermark, Krottendorf an der Laßnitz, Lebing, Petzelsdorf in der Weststeiermark, Tanzelsdorf, Vochera an der Laßnitz
- Großradl
  - Bachholz, Feisternitz, Kleinradl, Kornriegl, Oberlatein, Pongratzen, Stammeregg, Sterglegg, Wuggitz
- Gundersdorf
  - Grubberg
- Hollenegg
  - Aichegg, Hohlbach, Kresbach, Neuberg, Rettenbach, Trag, Kruckenberg
- Kloster
  - Rettenbach, Klosterwinkel
- Lannach
  - Blumegg, Breitenbach in der Weststeiermark, Heuholz, Hötschdorf, Sajach, Teipl
- Limberg bei Wies
  - Limberg, Mitterlimberg
- Marhof
  - Angenofen, Rainbach, Sierling, Teufenbach, Trog, Wald in der Weststeiermark
- Osterwitz
- Pitschgau
  - Bischofegg, Haselbach, Hörmsdorf
- Pölfing-Brunn
  - Brunn, Jagernigg, Pölfing
- Preding
  - Klein-Preding, Tobis, Tobisberg, Wieselsdorf
- Rassach
  - Graschuh, Herbersdorf, Lasselsdorf
- Sankt Josef
  - Oisnitz, Tobisegg
- Sankt Martin im Sulmtal
  - Aigen, Bergla, Dörfla, Greith, Gutenacker, Oberhart, Otternitz, Reitererberg, Sulb
- Sankt Oswald ob Eibiswald
  - Krumbach, Mitterstraßen, Rothwein
- Sankt Peter im Sulmtal
  - Freidorf, Kerschbaum, Korbin, Moos, Poppenforst, Wieden
- Sankt Stefan ob Stainz
  - Lemsitz, Lichtenhof, Pirkhof, Zirknitz
- Schwanberg
  - Mainsdorf
- Soboth
  - Laaken
- Stainz
  - Gamsgebirg, Kothvogel, Neurath
- Stainztal
  - Grafendorf bei Stainz, Graggerer, Mettersdorf, Neudorf bei Stainz, Wetzelsdorfberg, Wetzelsdorf in der Weststeiermark
- Stallhof
- Sulmeck-Greith
  - Dietmannsdorf im Sulmtal, Gasselsdorf, Graschach, Kopreinigg, Pitschgauegg, Tombach
- Trahütten
  - Kruckenberg, Rostock
- Unterbergla
  - Grub bei Groß Sankt Florian, Hasreith, Michlgleinz, Mönichgleinz, Nassau, Sulzhof
- Wernersdorf
  - Buchenberg, Kogl, Pörbach
- Wettmannstätten
  - Lassenberg, Schönaich, Weniggleinz, Wohlsdorf, Zehndorf
- Wielfresen
  - Unterfresen, Wiel
- Wies
  - Altenmarkt, Aug, Buchegg, Etzendorf, Gaißeregg, Gieselegg, Lamberg, Vordersdorf
