= Georgsberg =

- Former municipality
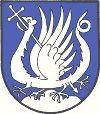
- Coat of arms

- Location within Austria
- Coordinates: 46°54′19″N 15°16′43″E
- Country: Austria
- State: Styria
- District: Deutschlandsberg

Area
  - Total: 13.44 km^{2} (5.19 sq mi)
- Elevation: 384 m (1,260 ft)

Population (1 January 2016)
  - Total: 1,528
  - Density: 113.7/km^{2} (294.5/sq mi)
- Time zone: UTC+1 (CET)
  - Summer (DST): UTC+2 (CEST)
- Postal code: 8510
- Area code: 3463
- Vehicle registration: DL
- Website: www.georgsberg. steiermark.at

Georgsberg is a former municipality in the district of Deutschlandsberg in the Austrian state of Styria. Since the 2015 Styria municipal structural reform, it is part of the municipality Stainz.

== Population ==
Historical population
Year	Pop.	±%
1869	932	—
1880	961	+3.1%
1890	1,047	+8.9%
1900	985	−5.9%
1910	967	−1.8%
1923	971	+0.4%
1934	949	−2.3%
1939	888	−6.4%
1951	924	+4.1%
1961	1,002	+8.4%
1971	1,138	+13.6%
1981	1,235	+8.5%
1991	1,373	+11.2%
2001	1,422	+3.6%
2011	1,474	+3.7%
