= Sankt Peter im Sulmtal =

- Municipality
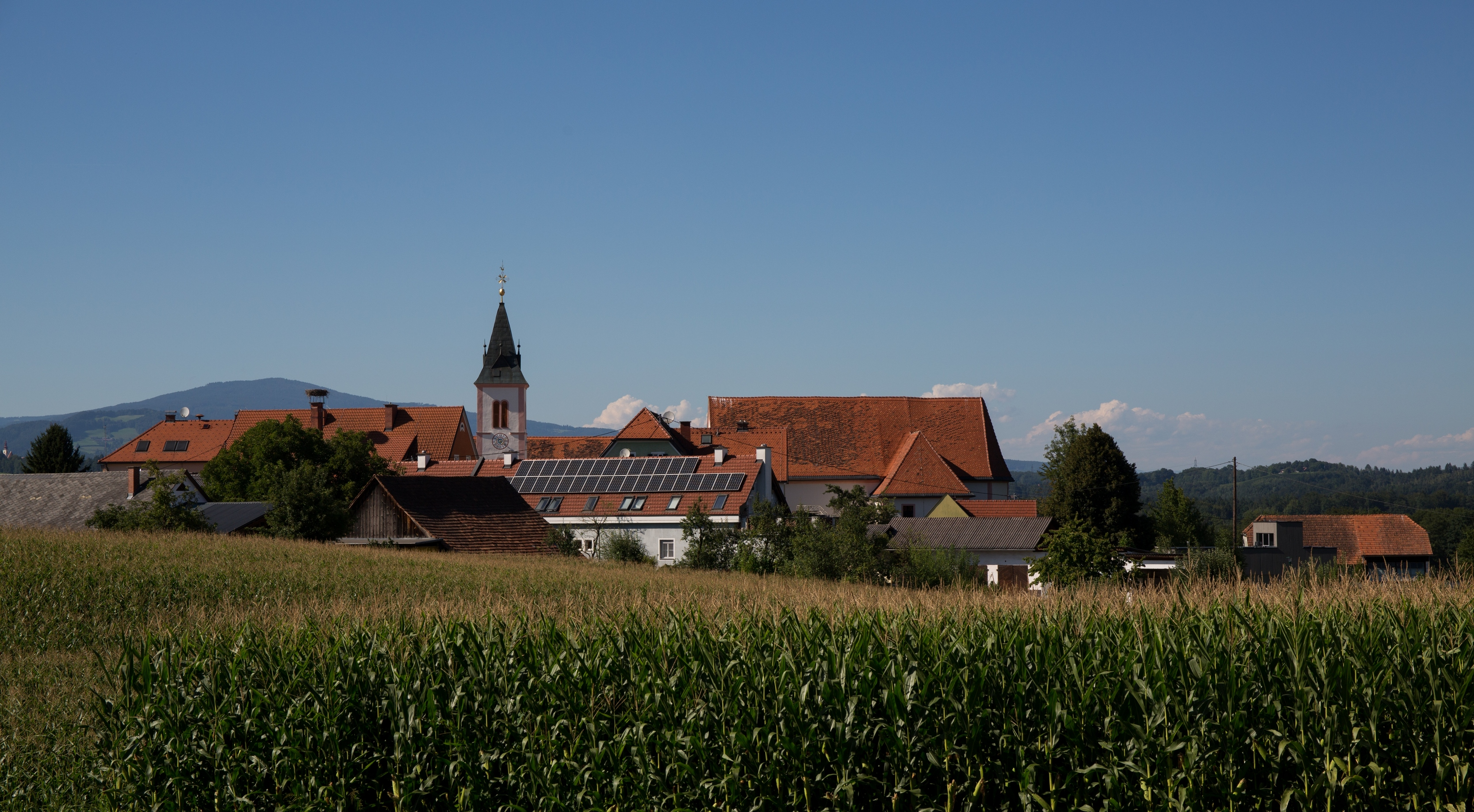
- View of Sankt Peter im Sulmtal

- Coat of arms

- Location within Austria
- Coordinates: 46°45′00″N 15°15′00″E
- Country: Austria
- State: Styria
- District: Deutschlandsberg

Government
  - Mayor: Alois Painsi (ÖVP)

Area
  - Total: 10.95 km^{2} (4.23 sq mi)
- Elevation: 377 m (1,237 ft)

Population (2018-01-01)
  - Total: 1,268
  - Density: 115.8/km^{2} (299.9/sq mi)
- Time zone: UTC+1 (CET)
  - Summer (DST): UTC+2 (CEST)
- Postal code: 8542
- Area code: 03467
- Vehicle registration: DL
- Website: www.europadorf.at

Sankt Peter im Sulmtal is a municipality in the district of Deutschlandsberg in the Austrian state of Styria.

== Population ==
Historical population
Year	Pop.	±%
1869	864	—
1880	914	+5.8%
1890	952	+4.2%
1900	914	−4.0%
1910	938	+2.6%
1923	949	+1.2%
1934	961	+1.3%
1939	879	−8.5%
1951	1,013	+15.2%
1961	1,045	+3.2%
1971	1,099	+5.2%
1981	1,295	+17.8%
1991	1,256	−3.0%
2001	1,267	+0.9%
2011	1,329	+4.9%
