= Marhof =

- Former municipality
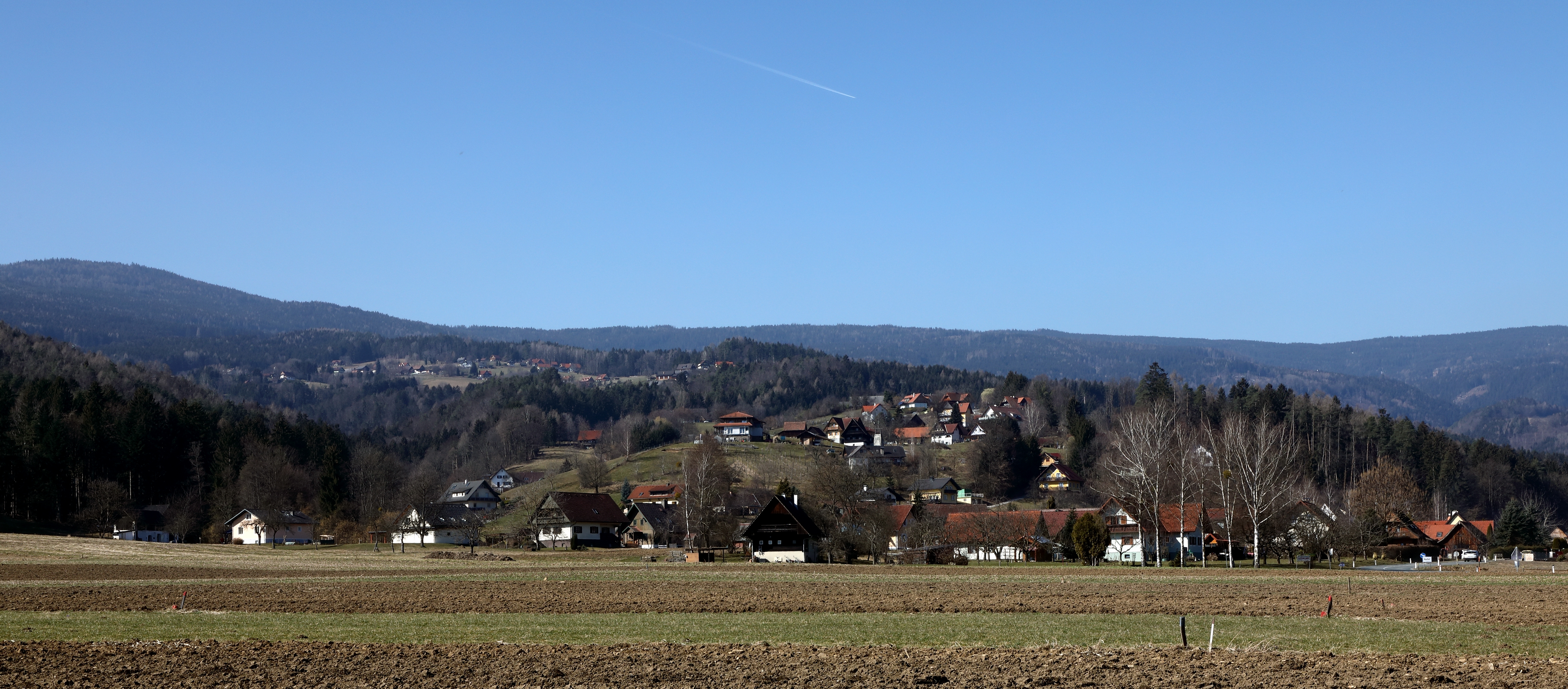
- Marhof

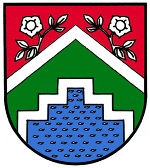
- Coat of arms

- Location within Austria
- Coordinates: 46°54′00″N 15°13′00″E
- Country: Austria
- State: Styria
- District: Deutschlandsberg

Area
  - Total: 30.80 km^{2} (11.89 sq mi)
- Elevation: 460 m (1,510 ft)

Population (1 January 2016)
  - Total: 1,047
  - Density: 33.99/km^{2} (88.04/sq mi)
- Time zone: UTC+1 (CET)
  - Summer (DST): UTC+2 (CEST)
- Postal code: 8510
- Area code: +43 3463
- Vehicle registration: DL

Marhof is a former municipality in the district of Deutschlandsberg in the Austrian state of Styria. Since the 2015 Styria municipal structural reform, it is part of the municipality Stainz.

== Population ==
Historical population
Year	Pop.	±%
1869	1,141	—
1880	1,164	+2.0%
1890	1,273	+9.4%
1900	1,143	−10.2%
1910	1,164	+1.8%
1923	1,077	−7.5%
1934	1,200	+11.4%
1939	1,193	−0.6%
1951	1,186	−0.6%
1961	1,092	−7.9%
1971	1,164	+6.6%
1981	1,119	−3.9%
1991	1,074	−4.0%
2001	1,063	−1.0%
2011	1,013	−4.7%
