= Sankt Oswald ob Eibiswald =

- Former municipality
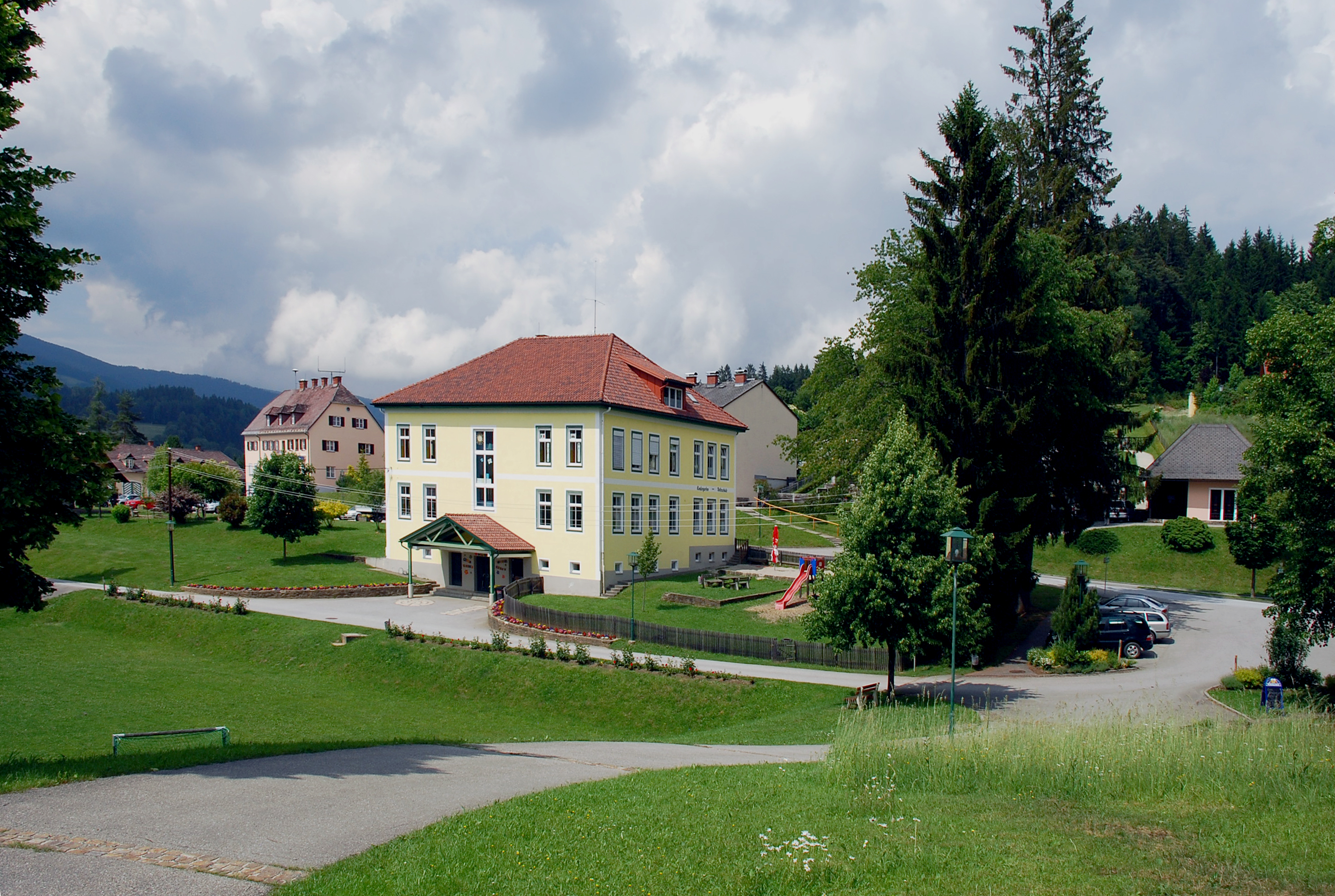
- View of Sankt Oswald ob Eibiswald

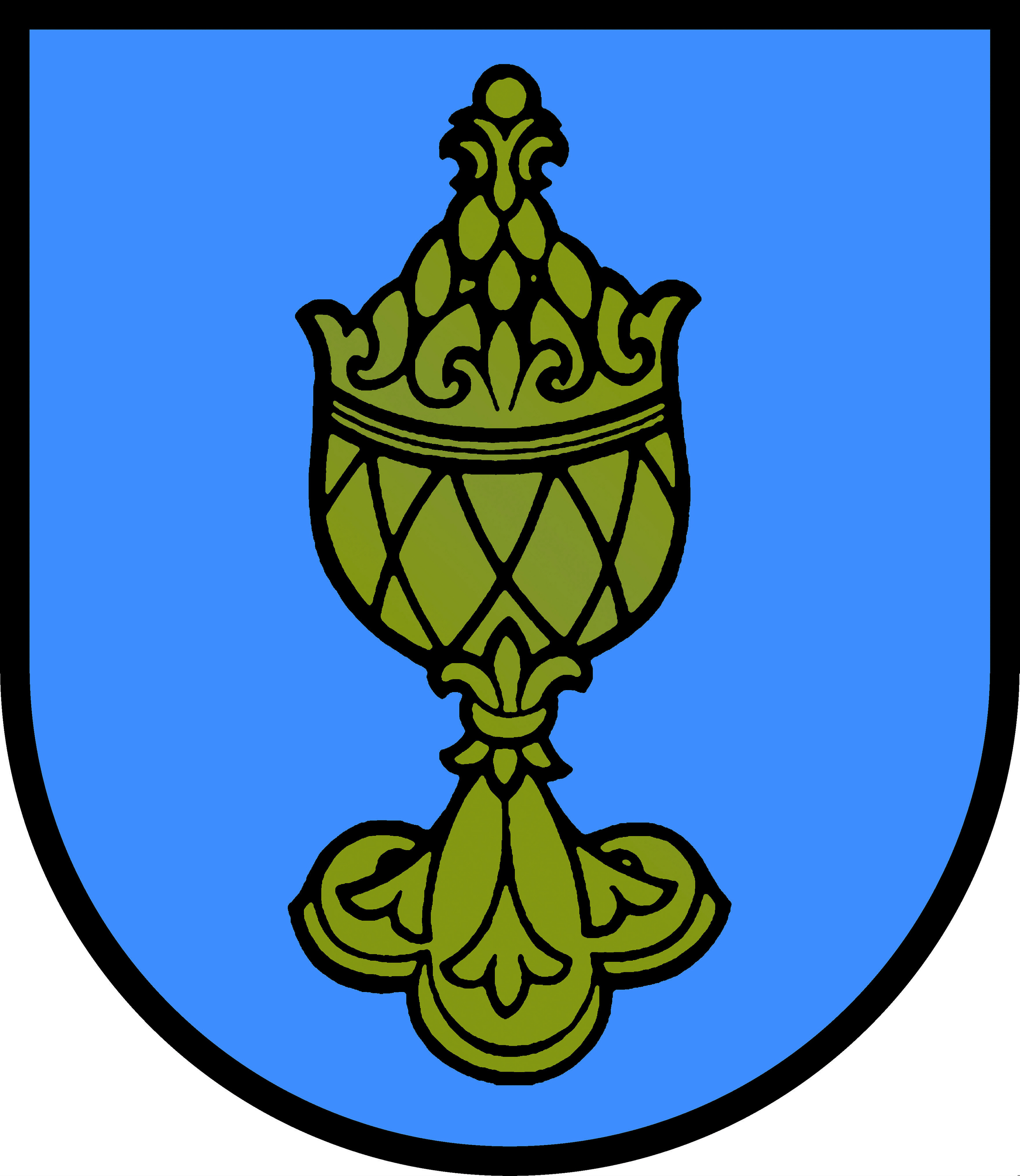
- Coat of arms

- Location within Austria
- Coordinates: 46°42′30″N 15°08′48″E
- Country: Austria
- State: Styria
- District: Deutschlandsberg

Area
  - Total: 22.43 km^{2} (8.66 sq mi)
- Elevation: 747 m (2,451 ft)

Population (2014-01-01)
  - Total: 562
  - Density: 25.1/km^{2} (64.9/sq mi)
- Time zone: UTC+1 (CET)
  - Summer (DST): UTC+2 (CEST)
- Postal code: 8553
- Area code: 03468
- Vehicle registration: DL
- Website: www.oswald-o-e.at

Sankt Oswald ob Eibiswald was a municipality in Austria which merged in January 2015 into Eibiswald in the Deutschlandsberg District in the Austrian state of Styria.

== Population ==
Historical population
Year	Pop.	±%
1869	723	—
1880	755	+4.4%
1890	712	−5.7%
1900	731	+2.7%
1910	806	+10.3%
1923	779	−3.3%
1934	774	−0.6%
1939	820	+5.9%
1951	896	+9.3%
1961	814	−9.2%
1971	823	+1.1%
1981	747	−9.2%
1991	701	−6.2%
2001	641	−8.6%
2011	580	−9.5%
2014	562	−3.1%
