= Preding =

- Municipality
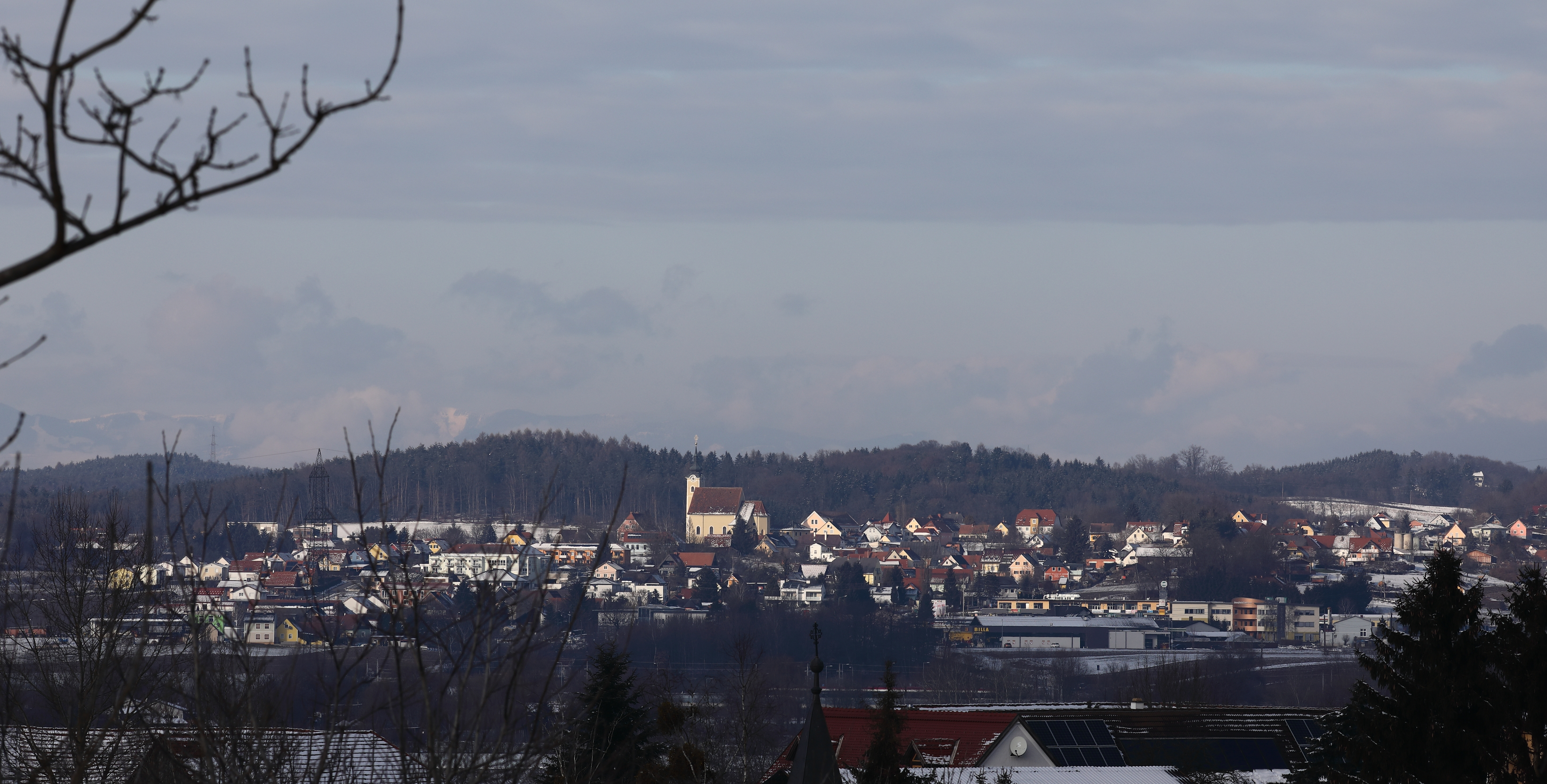
- Panoramic view of Preding

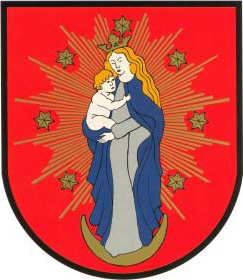
- Coat of arms

- Location within Austria
- Coordinates: 46°51′00″N 15°23′00″E
- Country: Austria
- State: Styria
- District: Deutschlandsberg

Government
  - Mayor: Adolf Meixner (SPÖ)

Area
  - Total: 18.19 km^{2} (7.02 sq mi)
- Elevation: 335 m (1,099 ft)

Population (2018-01-01)
  - Total: 1,767
  - Density: 97.14/km^{2} (251.6/sq mi)
- Time zone: UTC+1 (CET)
  - Summer (DST): UTC+2 (CEST)
- Postal code: 8504
- Area code: +43 3185
- Vehicle registration: DL
- Website: www.gemeinde-preding.at

Preding (German: [ˈpʁeːdiŋ]) is a municipality in the district of Deutschlandsberg in the Austrian state of Styria.

== Population ==
Historical population
Year	Pop.	±%
1869	1,384	—
1880	1,563	+12.9%
1890	1,574	+0.7%
1900	1,515	−3.7%
1910	1,477	−2.5%
1923	1,505	+1.9%
1934	1,454	−3.4%
1939	1,364	−6.2%
1951	1,477	+8.3%
1961	1,392	−5.8%
1971	1,577	+13.3%
1981	1,504	−4.6%
1991	1,573	+4.6%
2001	1,642	+4.4%
2011	1,723	+4.9%
