= Trahütten =

- Former municipality
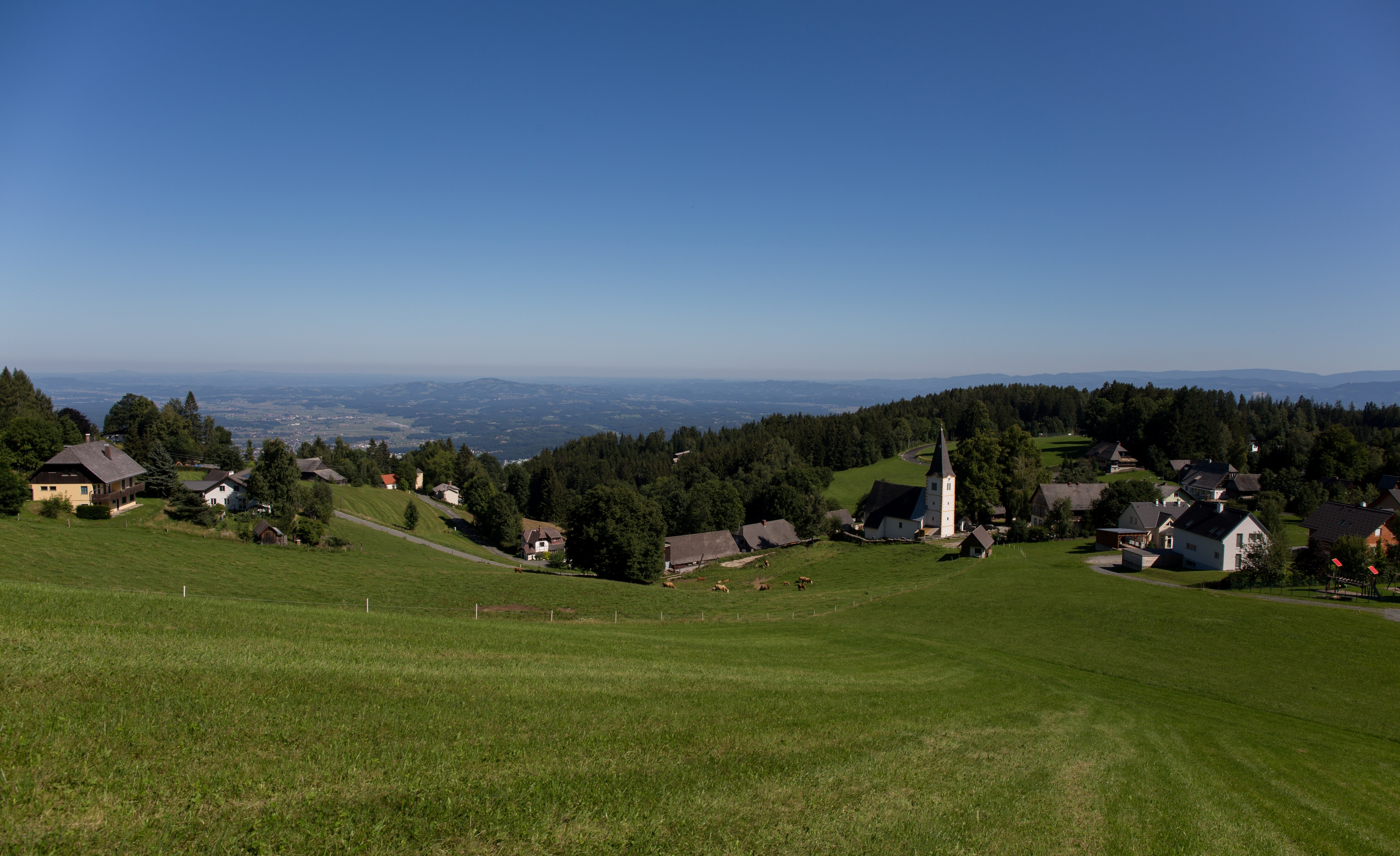
- Trahütten

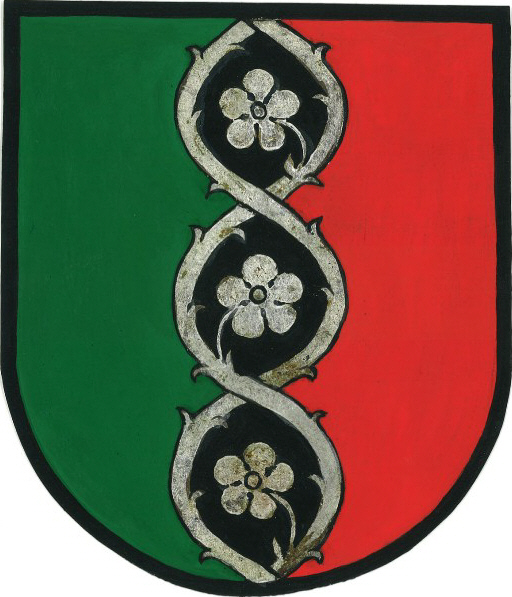
- Coat of arms

- Location within Austria
- Coordinates: 46°49′23″N 15°09′08″E
- Country: Austria
- State: Styria
- District: Deutschlandsberg

Area
  - Total: 28.23 km^{2} (10.90 sq mi)
- Elevation: 994 m (3,261 ft)

Population (1 January 2016)
  - Total: 396
  - Density: 14.0/km^{2} (36.3/sq mi)
- Time zone: UTC+1 (CET)
  - Summer (DST): UTC+2 (CEST)
- Postal code: 8530
- Area code: 03461
- Vehicle registration: DL
- Website: www.trahuetten.at

Trahütten is a former municipality in the district of Deutschlandsberg in Austrian state of Styria. Since the 2015 Styria municipal structural reform, it is part of the municipality Deutschlandsberg.

== Population ==
Historical population
Year	Pop.	±%
1869	666	—
1880	637	−4.4%
1890	609	−4.4%
1900	559	−8.2%
1910	531	−5.0%
1923	613	+15.4%
1934	604	−1.5%
1939	577	−4.5%
1951	559	−3.1%
1961	482	−13.8%
1971	439	−8.9%
1981	402	−8.4%
1991	391	−2.7%
2001	412	+5.4%
2011	402	−2.4%
