= Freiland bei Deutschlandsberg =

- Former municipality
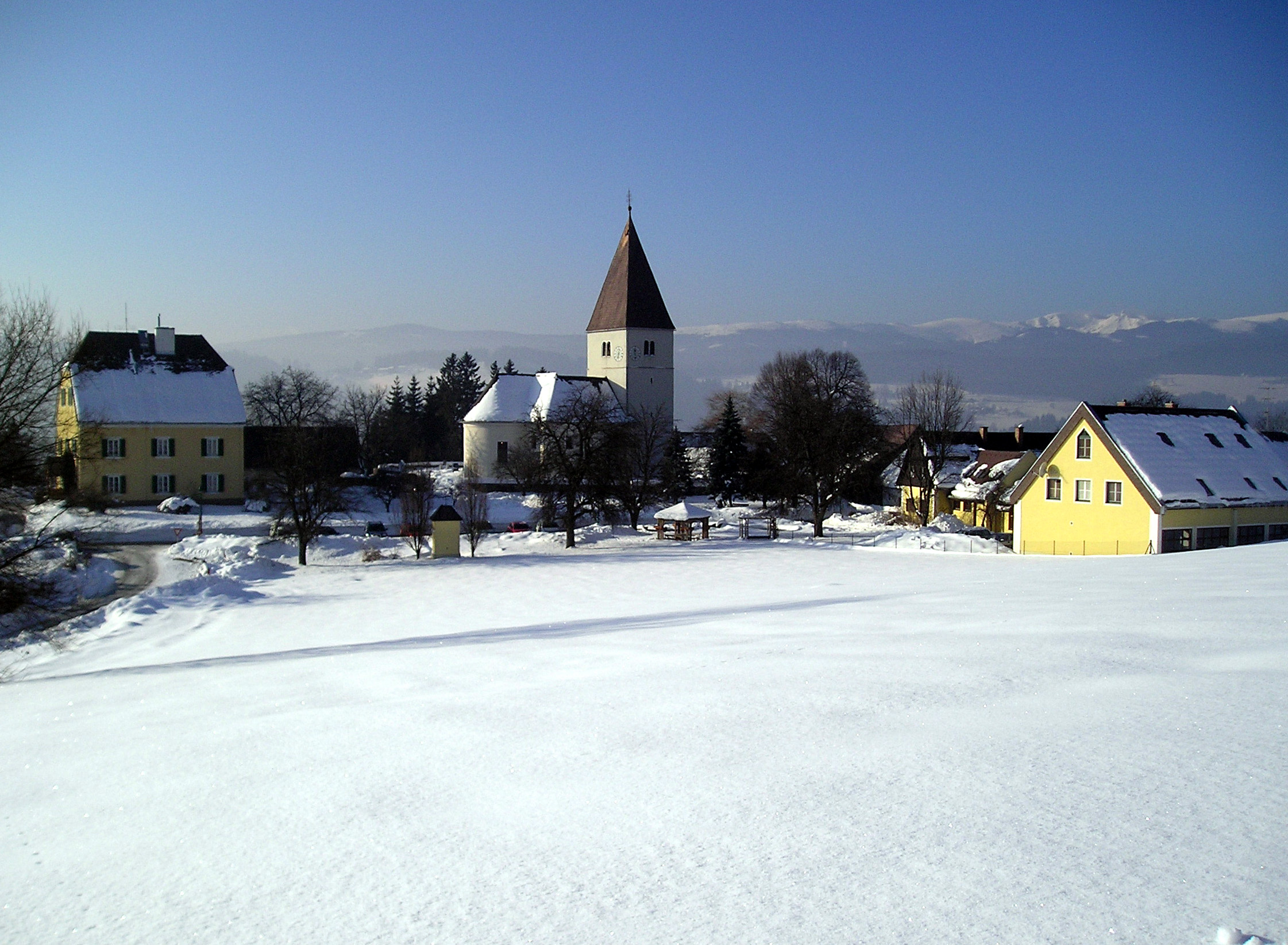
- Village centre

- Coat of arms

- Location within Austria
- Coordinates: 46°50′52″N 15°08′28″E
- Country: Austria
- State: Styria
- District: Deutschlandsberg

Area
  - Total: 10.27 km^{2} (3.97 sq mi)
- Elevation: 847 m (2,779 ft)

Population (1 January 2016)
  - Total: 153
  - Density: 14.9/km^{2} (38.6/sq mi)
- Time zone: UTC+1 (CET)
  - Summer (DST): UTC+2 (CEST)
- Postal code: 8530
- Area code: 03462, 03469
- Vehicle registration: DL
- Website: www.freiland-deutschlandsberg. steiermark.at

Freiland bei Deutschlandsberg is a former municipality in the district of Deutschlandsberg in the Austrian state of Styria. Since the 2015 Styria municipal structural reform, it is part of the municipality Deutschlandsberg.

== Population ==
Historical population
Year	Pop.	±%
1770	323	—
1782	304	−5.9%
1812	182	−40.1%
1846	211	+15.9%
1869	260	+23.2%
1880	263	+1.2%
1890	267	+1.5%
1900	308	+15.4%
1910	294	−4.5%
1923	324	+10.2%
1934	314	−3.1%
1939	262	−16.6%
1951	276	+5.3%
1961	250	−9.4%
1971	168	−32.8%
1981	155	−7.7%
1991	162	+4.5%
2001	128	−21.0%
2011	148	+15.6%
