= Rassach =

- Former municipality
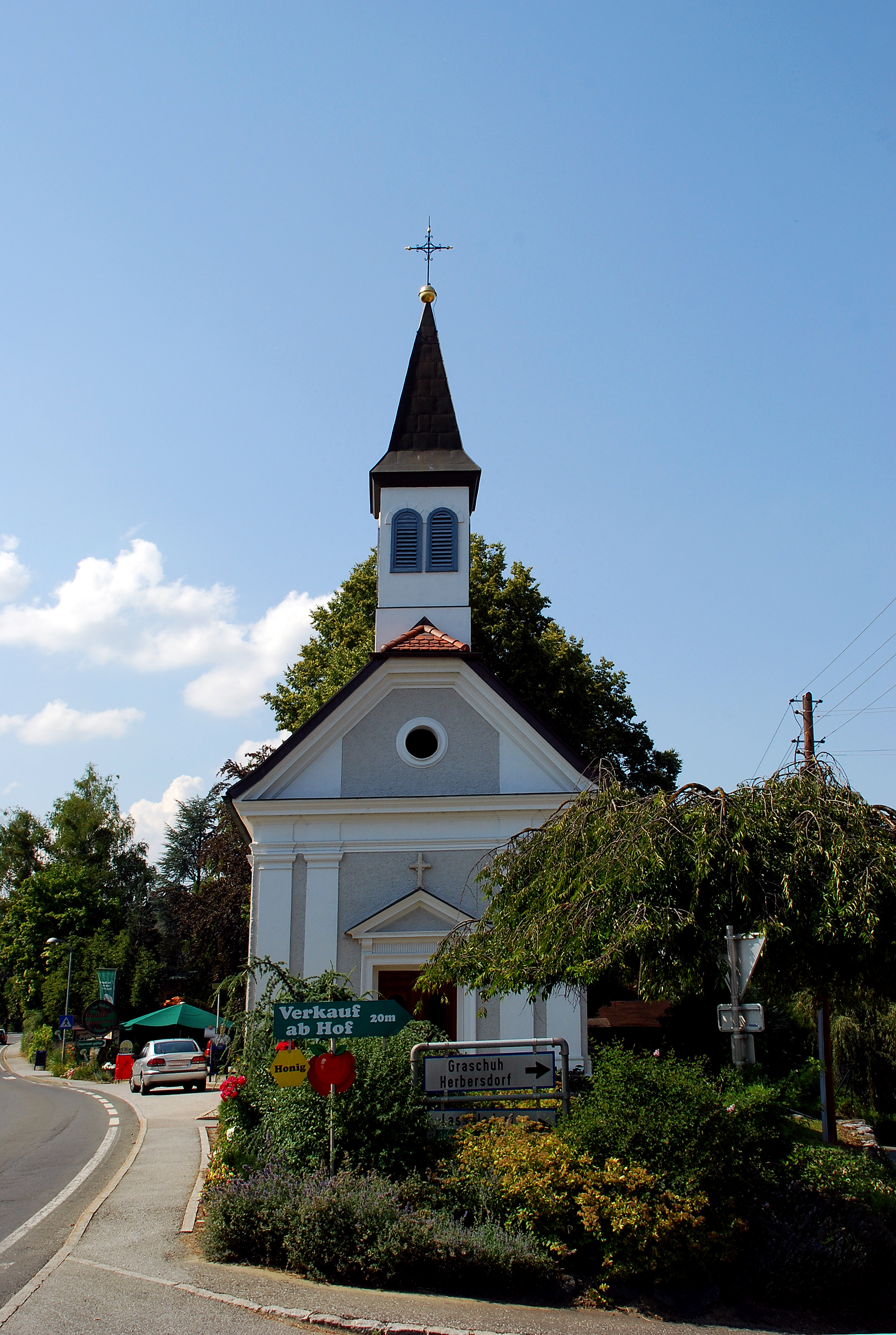
- Chapel in Rassach

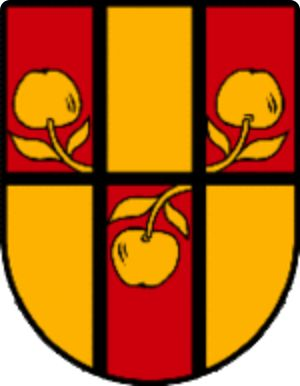
- Coat of arms

- Location within Austria
- Coordinates: 46°51′37″N 15°16′12″E
- Country: Austria
- State: Styria
- District: Deutschlandsberg

Area
  - Total: 18.14 km^{2} (7.00 sq mi)
- Elevation: 392 m (1,286 ft)

Population (1 January 2016)
  - Total: 1,413
  - Density: 77.89/km^{2} (201.7/sq mi)
- Time zone: UTC+1 (CET)
  - Summer (DST): UTC+2 (CEST)
- Postal code: 8510, 8522, 8524
- Area code: 03464
- Vehicle registration: DL
- Website: www.rassach.at

Rassach is a former municipality in the district of Deutschlandsberg in the Austrian state of Styria. Since the 2015 Styria municipal structural reform, it is part of the municipality Stainz.

== Population ==
Historical population
| Year | Pop. | ±% |
|---|---|---|
| 1869 | 1,193 | — |
| 1880 | 1,255 | +5.2% |
| 1890 | 1,328 | +5.8% |
| 1900 | 1,269 | −4.4% |
| 1910 | 1,254 | −1.2% |
| 1923 | 1,221 | −2.6% |
| 1934 | 1,189 | −2.6% |
| 1939 | 1,109 | −6.7% |
| 1951 | 1,203 | +8.5% |
| 1961 | 1,197 | −0.5% |
| 1971 | 1,238 | +3.4% |
| 1981 | 1,273 | +2.8% |
| 1991 | 1,286 | +1.0% |
| 2001 | 1,388 | +7.9% |
| 2011 | 1,436 | +3.5% |
