= Pölfing-Brunn =

- Municipality
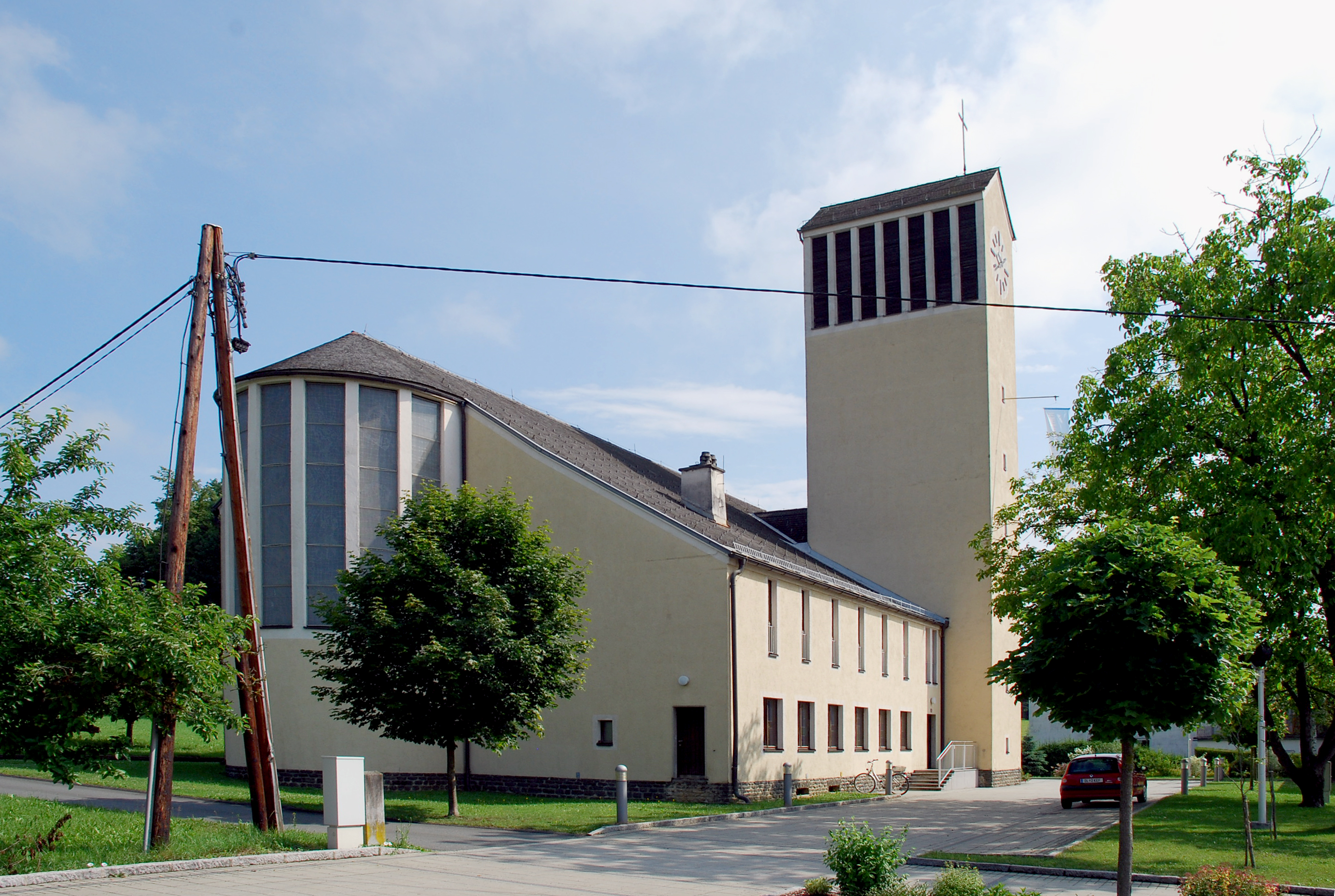
- Pölfing-Brunn parish church

- Coat of arms

- Location within Austria
- Coordinates: 46°43′00″N 15°16′00″E
- Country: Austria
- State: Styria
- District: Deutschlandsberg

Government
  - Mayor: Horst Pölzl (SPÖ)

Area
  - Total: 6.16 km^{2} (2.38 sq mi)
- Elevation: 337 m (1,106 ft)

Population (2018-01-01)
  - Total: 1,619
  - Density: 263/km^{2} (681/sq mi)
- Time zone: UTC+1 (CET)
  - Summer (DST): UTC+2 (CEST)
- Postal code: 8544
- Area code: 03465
- Vehicle registration: DL
- Website: www.poelfing-brunn.gv.at

Pölfing-Brunn is a municipality in the district of Deutschlandsberg in the Austrian state of Styria.

== Population ==
Historical population
Year	Pop.	±%
1869	674	—
1880	1,779	+163.9%
1890	2,044	+14.9%
1900	1,241	−39.3%
1910	1,487	+19.8%
1923	1,998	+34.4%
1934	1,943	−2.8%
1939	1,759	−9.5%
1951	2,037	+15.8%
1961	2,103	+3.2%
1971	2,115	+0.6%
1981	2,017	−4.6%
1991	1,902	−5.7%
2001	1,785	−6.2%
2011	1,651	−7.5%
