= Wettmannstätten =

- Municipality
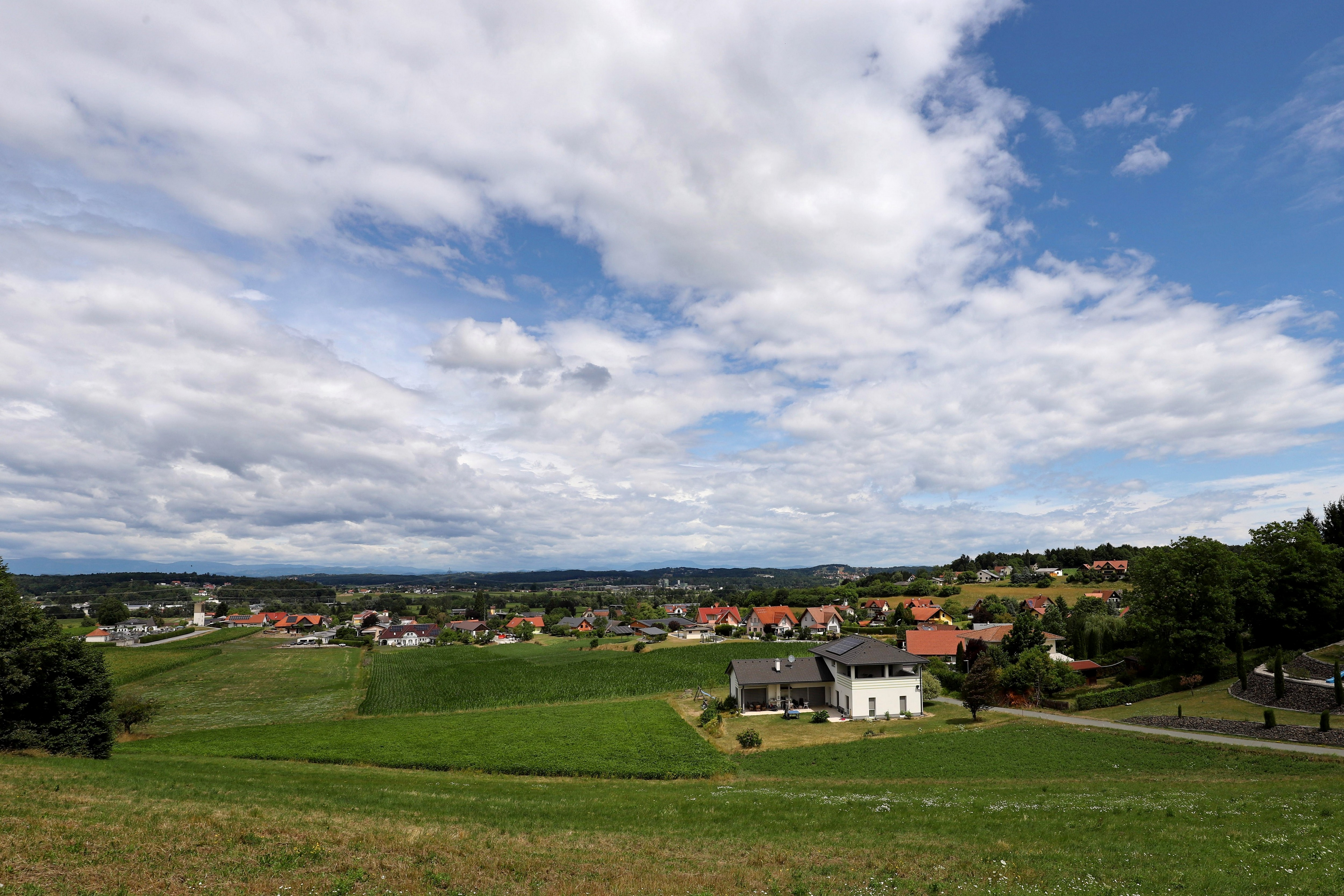
- Wettmannstätten

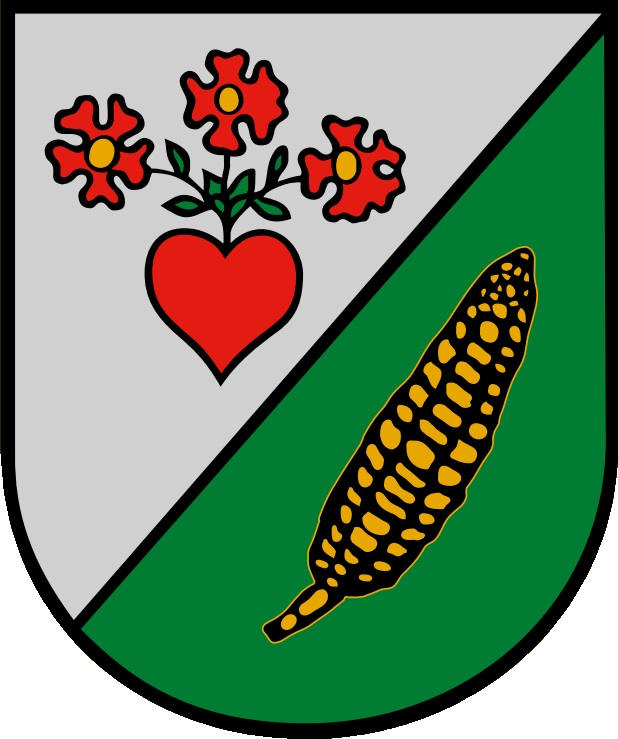
- Coat of arms

- Location within Austria
- Coordinates: 46°49′48″N 15°23′03″E
- Country: Austria
- State: Styria
- District: Deutschlandsberg

Government
  - Mayor: Peter Neger (ÖVP)

Area
  - Total: 17.97 km^{2} (6.94 sq mi)
- Elevation: 320 m (1,050 ft)

Population (2018-01-01)
  - Total: 1,600
  - Density: 89/km^{2} (230/sq mi)
- Time zone: UTC+1 (CET)
  - Summer (DST): UTC+2 (CEST)
- Postal code: 8521
- Area code: 03185
- Vehicle registration: DL
- Website: www.wettmannstaetten. steiermark.at

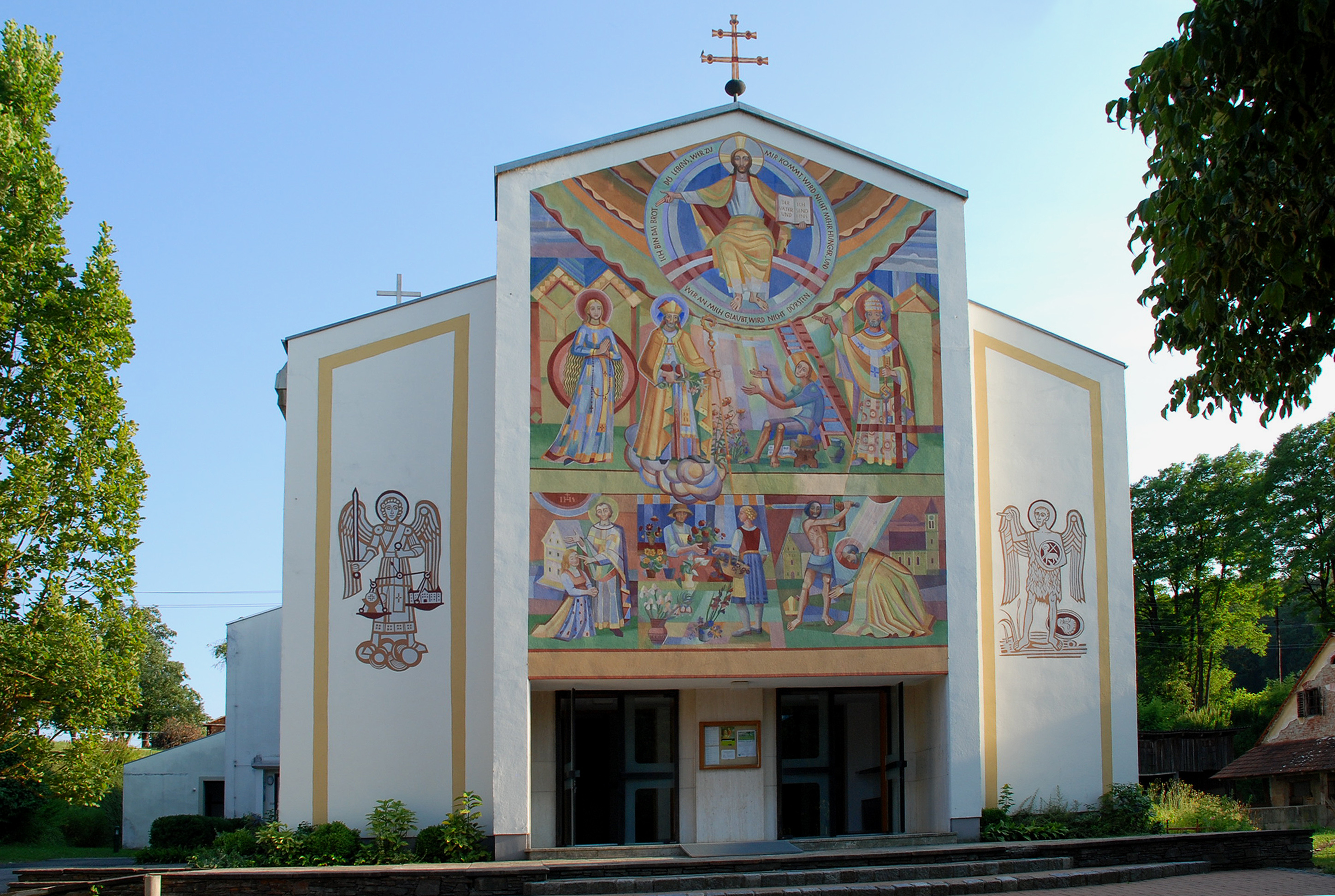
Wettmannstätten parish church

Wettmannstätten is a municipality in the district of Deutschlandsberg in the Austrian state of Styria.

== Population ==
Historical population
Year	Pop.	±%
1869	1,221	—
1880	1,204	−1.4%
1890	1,183	−1.7%
1900	1,121	−5.2%
1910	1,183	+5.5%
1923	1,204	+1.8%
1934	1,223	+1.6%
1939	1,359	+11.1%
1951	1,247	−8.2%
1961	1,237	−0.8%
1971	1,325	+7.1%
1981	1,392	+5.1%
1991	1,428	+2.6%
2001	1,454	+1.8%
2011	1,521	+4.6%
