= Kloster, Styria =

Kloster
- Former municipality
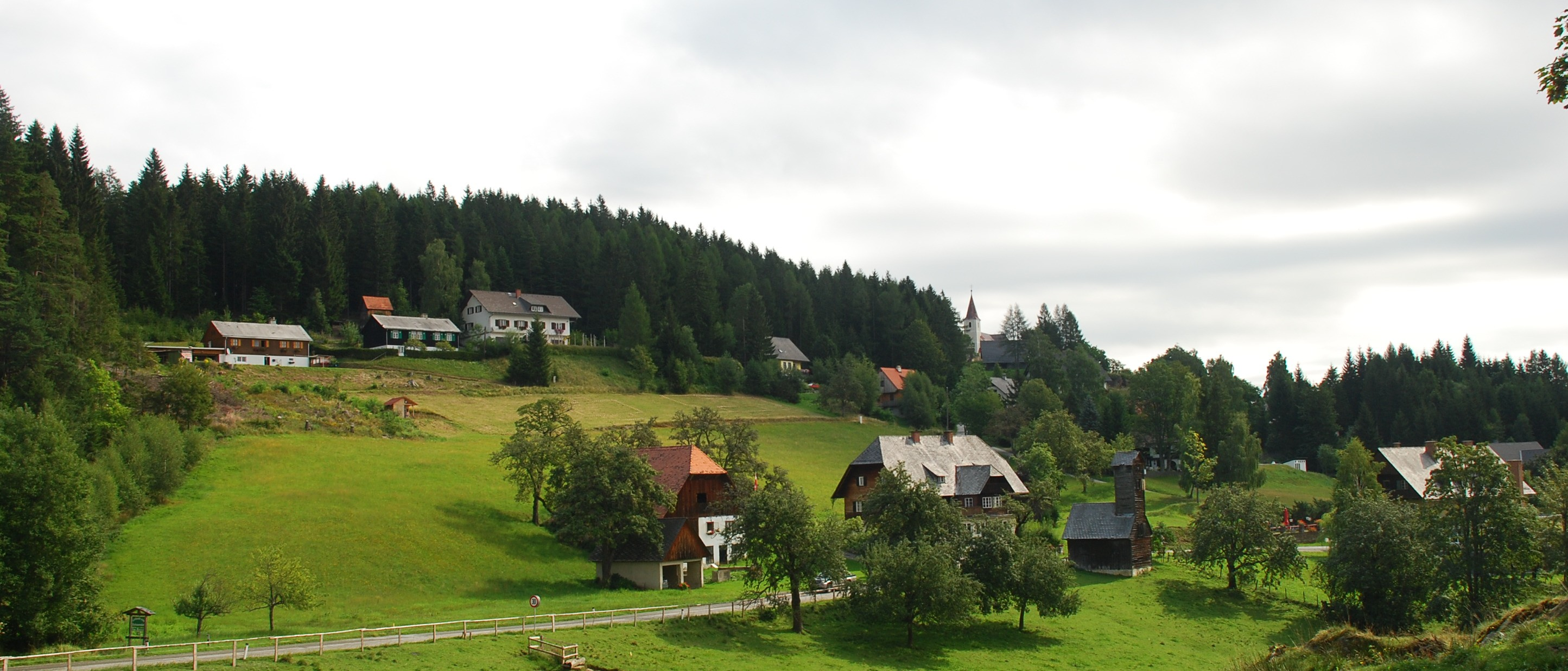

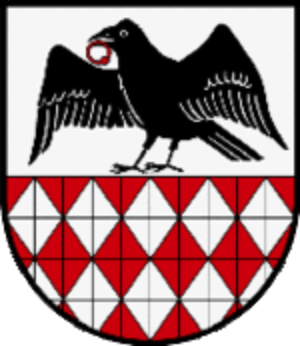
- Coat of arms

- Location within Austria
- Coordinates: 46°53′21.00″N 15°06′01.90″E
- Country: Austria
- State: Styria
- District: Deutschlandsberg

Area
  - Total: 22.1 km^{2} (8.5 sq mi)
- Elevation: 1,050 m (3,440 ft)

Population (1 January 2016)
  - Total: 194
  - Density: 8.78/km^{2} (22.7/sq mi)
- Time zone: UTC+1 (CET)
  - Summer (DST): UTC+2 (CEST)
- Postal code: 8530
- Area code: +43 3469
- Vehicle registration: DL
- Website: www.kloster. steiermark.at

Kloster is a former municipality in the district of Deutschlandsberg in the Austrian state of Styria. Since the 2015 Styria municipal structural reform, it is part of the municipality Deutschlandsberg.

== Population ==
Historical population
Year	Pop.	±%
1848	284	—
1850	277	−2.5%
1869	274	−1.1%
1880	282	+2.9%
1890	273	−3.2%
1900	340	+24.5%
1910	324	−4.7%
1923	304	−6.2%
1934	310	+2.0%
1939	553	+78.4%
1951	307	−44.5%
1961	299	−2.6%
1971	300	+0.3%
1981	266	−11.3%
1991	244	−8.3%
2001	233	−4.5%
2011	202	−13.3%
