= Unterbergla =

- Former municipality
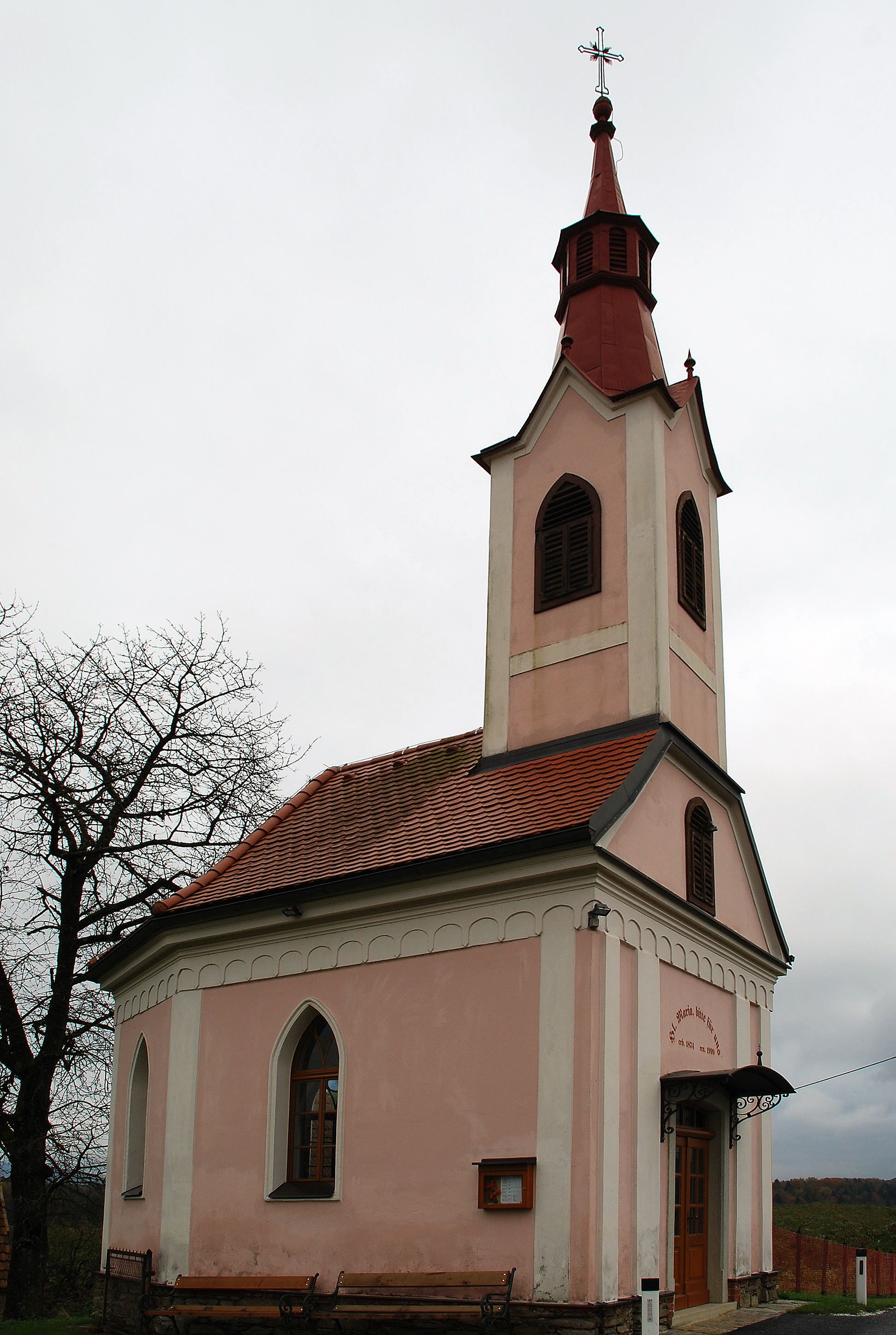
- Chapel in Sulzhof, Unterbergla

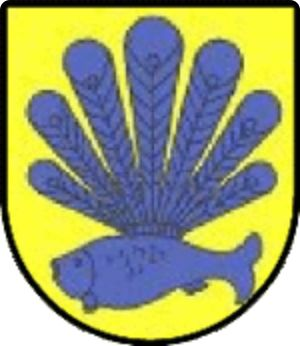
- Coat of arms

- Location within Austria
- Coordinates: 46°48′36″N 15°18′52″E
- Country: Austria
- State: Styria
- District: Deutschlandsberg

Area
  - Total: 22.97 km^{2} (8.87 sq mi)
- Elevation: 382 m (1,253 ft)

Population (1 January 2016)
  - Total: 1,338
  - Density: 58.25/km^{2} (150.9/sq mi)
- Time zone: UTC+1 (CET)
  - Summer (DST): UTC+2 (CEST)
- Postal code: 8522
- Area code: 03464
- Vehicle registration: DL
- Website: www.unterbergla. steiermark.at

Unterbergla is a former municipality in the district of Deutschlandsberg in the Austrian state of Styria. Since the 2015 Styria municipal structural reform, it is part of the municipality Groß Sankt Florian.

== Population ==
Historical population
Year	Pop.	±%
1869	1,425	—
1880	1,406	−1.3%
1890	1,363	−3.1%
1900	1,379	+1.2%
1910	1,400	+1.5%
1923	1,371	−2.1%
1934	1,415	+3.2%
1939	1,314	−7.1%
1951	1,406	+7.0%
1961	1,318	−6.3%
1971	1,397	+6.0%
1981	1,413	+1.1%
1991	1,425	+0.8%
2001	1,424	−0.1%
2011	1,392	−2.2%
