= Pitschgau =

- Former municipality
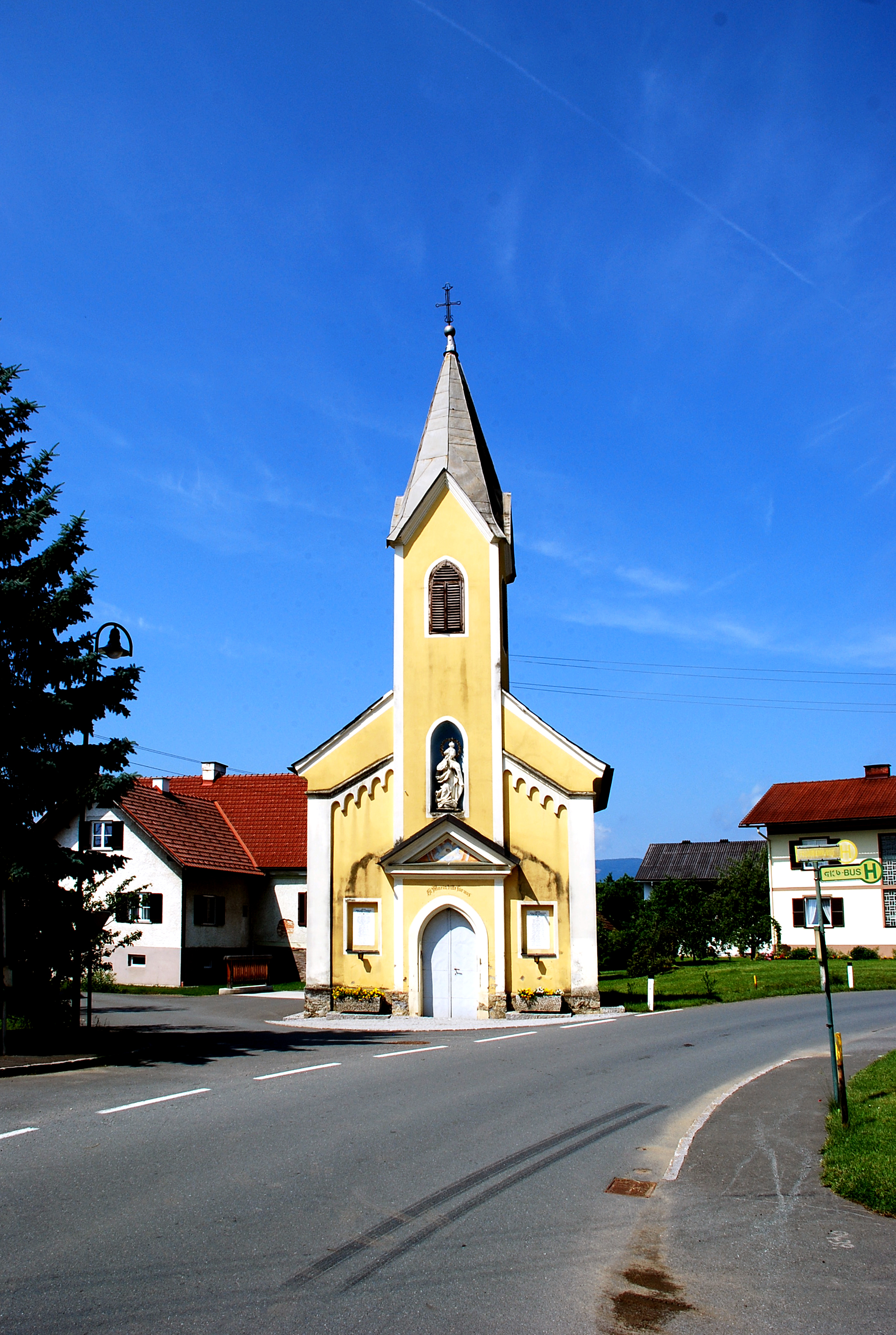
- Chapel in Pitschgau-Hörmsdorf

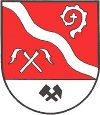
- Coat of arms

- Location within Austria
- Coordinates: 46°42′00″N 15°16′00″E
- Country: Austria
- State: Styria
- District: Deutschlandsberg

Area
  - Total: 12.19 km^{2} (4.71 sq mi)
- Elevation: 355 m (1,165 ft)

Population (2014-01-01)
  - Total: 1,586
  - Density: 130.1/km^{2} (337.0/sq mi)
- Time zone: UTC+1 (CET)
  - Summer (DST): UTC+2 (CEST)
- Postal code: 8552
- Area code: 3466
- Vehicle registration: DL
- Website: www.pitschgau.gv.at

Pitschgau was a municipality in Austria which merged in January 2015 into Eibiswald in the Deutschlandsberg District in the Austrian state of Styria.

== Population ==
Historical population
Year	Pop.	±%
1869	1,009	—
1880	1,211	+20.0%
1890	1,332	+10.0%
1900	1,334	+0.2%
1910	1,572	+17.8%
1923	1,406	−10.6%
1934	1,285	−8.6%
1939	1,231	−4.2%
1951	1,490	+21.0%
1961	1,590	+6.7%
1971	1,687	+6.1%
1981	1,649	−2.3%
1991	1,589	−3.6%
2001	1,631	+2.6%
2011	1,578	−3.2%
2014	1,586	+0.5%
