= Stainztal =

- Former municipality
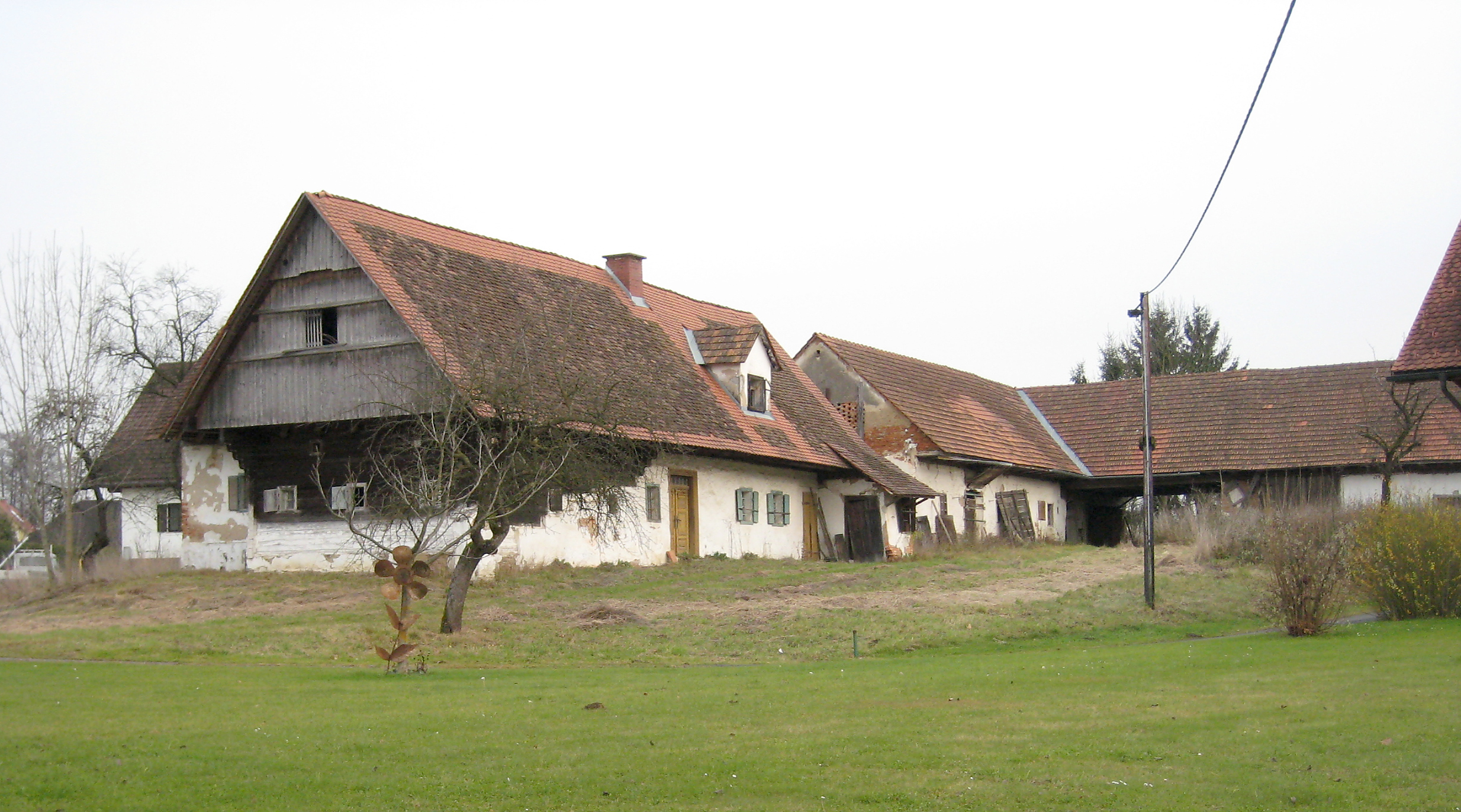
- Old farm in Stainztal

- Coat of arms

- Location within Austria
- Coordinates: 46°51′58″N 15°20′13″E
- Country: Austria
- State: Styria
- District: Deutschlandsberg

Area
  - Total: 19.82 km^{2} (7.65 sq mi)
- Elevation: 304 m (997 ft)

Population (1 January 2016)
  - Total: 1,444
  - Density: 72.86/km^{2} (188.7/sq mi)
- Time zone: UTC+1 (CET)
  - Summer (DST): UTC+2 (CEST)
- Postal code: 8503,8504,8510,8522
- Area code: 03185, 03463, 03464, 03136
- Vehicle registration: DL
- Website: www.stainztal.at

Stainztal is a former municipality in the district of Deutschlandsberg in the Austrian state of Styria. Since the 2015 Styria municipal structural reform, it is part of the municipality Stainz.

== Population ==
Historical population
Year	Pop.	±%
1869	1,444	—
1880	1,530	+6.0%
1890	1,594	+4.2%
1900	1,494	−6.3%
1910	1,483	−0.7%
1923	1,499	+1.1%
1934	1,476	−1.5%
1939	1,347	−8.7%
1951	1,369	+1.6%
1961	1,328	−3.0%
1971	1,277	−3.8%
1981	1,363	+6.7%
1991	1,440	+5.6%
2001	1,433	−0.5%
2011	1,463	+2.1%
