= Stallhof =

- Former municipality
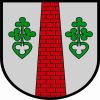
- Coat of arms

- Location within Austria
- Coordinates: 46°53′25″N 15°16′25″E
- Country: Austria
- State: Styria
- District: Deutschlandsberg

Area
  - Total: 1.06 km^{2} (0.41 sq mi)
- Elevation: 300 m (980 ft)

Population (1 January 2016)
  - Total: 535
  - Density: 505/km^{2} (1,310/sq mi)
- Time zone: UTC+1 (CET)
  - Summer (DST): UTC+2 (CEST)
- Postal code: 8510
- Area code: 03463
- Vehicle registration: DL
- Website: www.stallhof. steiermark.at

Stallhof is a former municipality in the district of Deutschlandsberg in the Austrian state of Styria. Since the 2015 Styria municipal structural reform, it is part of the municipality Stainz.

== Population ==
Historical population
Year	Pop.	±%
1869	99	—
1880	149	+50.5%
1890	455	+205.4%
1900	580	+27.5%
1910	545	−6.0%
1923	574	+5.3%
1934	456	−20.6%
1939	421	−7.7%
1951	524	+24.5%
1961	427	−18.5%
1971	515	+20.6%
1981	554	+7.6%
1991	496	−10.5%
2001	512	+3.2%
2011	531	+3.7%
