= Sankt Martin im Sulmtal =

- Municipality
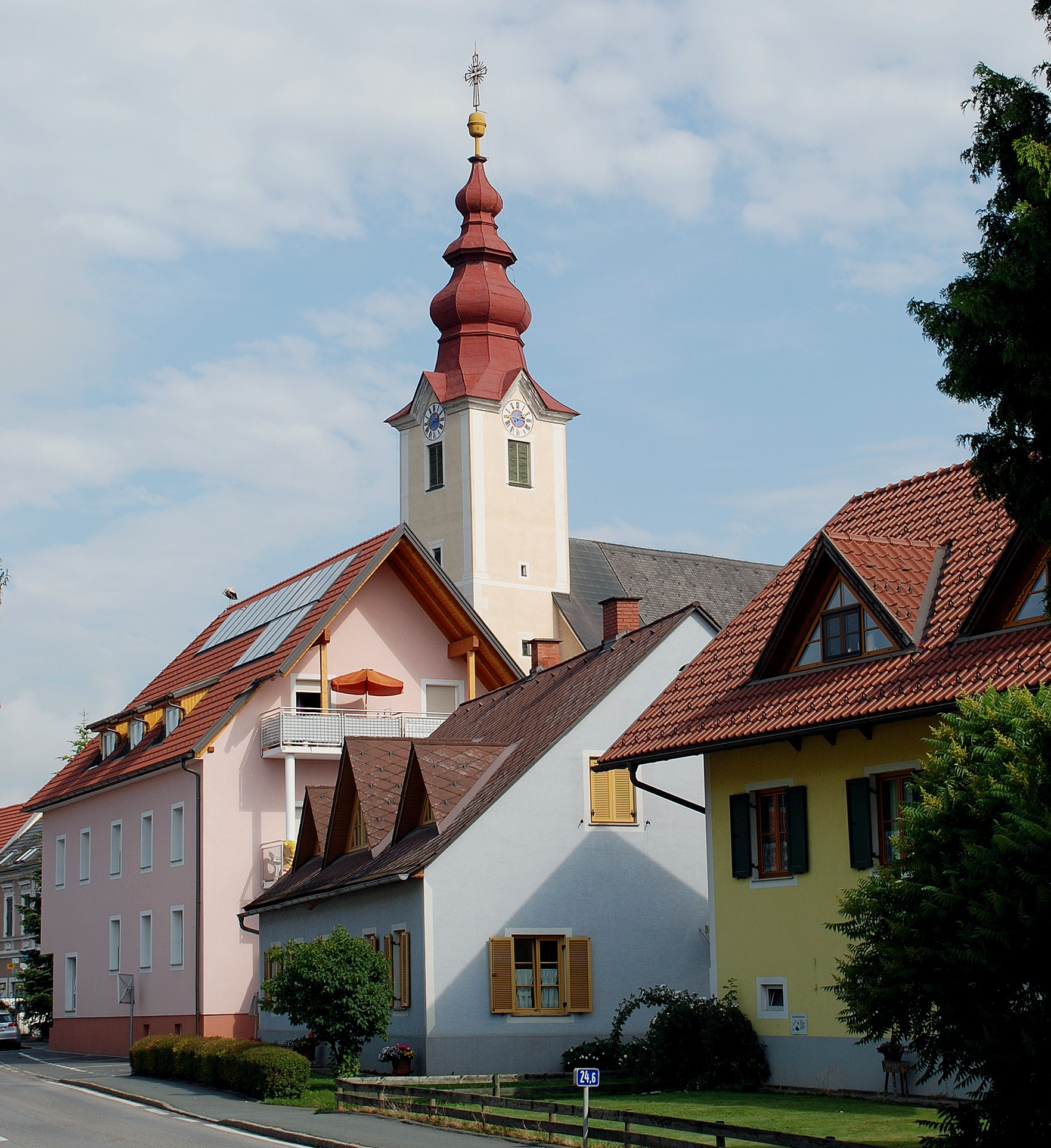
- View with parish church

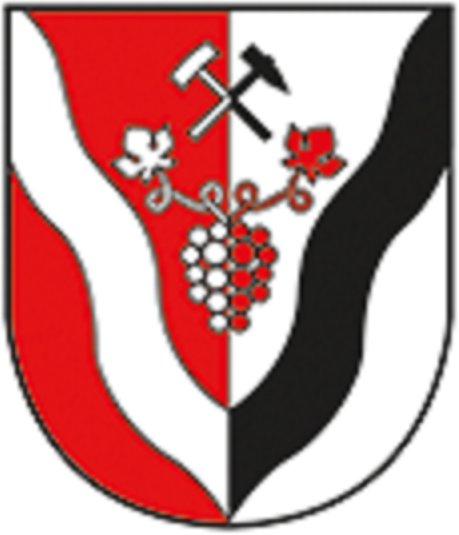
- Coat of arms

- Location within Austria
- Coordinates: 46°45′00″N 15°18′00″E
- Country: Austria
- State: Styria
- District: Deutschlandsberg

Government
  - Mayor: Franz Silly (ÖVP)

Area
  - Total: 39.16 km^{2} (15.12 sq mi)
- Elevation: 333 m (1,093 ft)

Population (2018-01-01)
  - Total: 3,059
  - Density: 78.12/km^{2} (202.3/sq mi)
- Time zone: UTC+1 (CET)
  - Summer (DST): UTC+2 (CEST)
- Postal code: 8543, 8443, 8522, 8542, 8544, 8551
- Area code: +43 3465, 3457
- Vehicle registration: DL
- Website: www.st-martin-i-s.at

Sankt Martin im Sulmtal is a municipality in the district of Deutschlandsberg in the Austrian state of Styria.

== Population ==
Historical population
Year	Pop.	±%
1869	2,969	—
1880	3,056	+2.9%
1890	3,116	+2.0%
1900	3,016	−3.2%
1910	2,903	−3.7%
1923	3,175	+9.4%
1934	3,209	+1.1%
1939	2,958	−7.8%
1951	3,404	+15.1%
1961	3,267	−4.0%
1971	3,331	+2.0%
1981	3,303	−0.8%
1991	3,492	+5.7%
2001	3,488	−0.1%
2011	3,155	−9.5%
2015	3,049	−3.4%
