= Sankt Stefan ob Stainz =

- Municipality
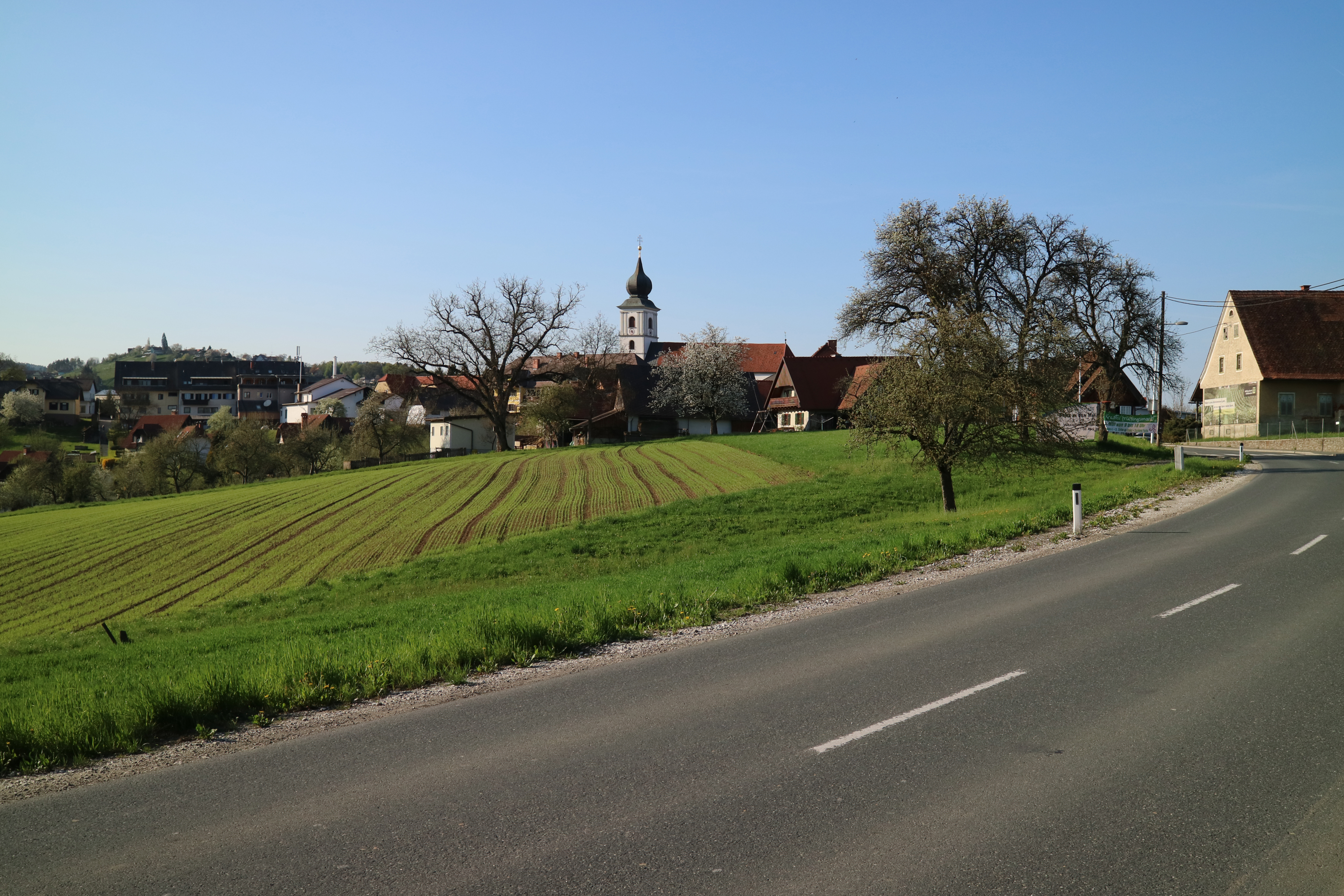
- View from south

- Coat of arms

- Location within Austria
- Coordinates: 46°55′43″N 15°15′32″E
- Country: Austria
- State: Styria
- District: Deutschlandsberg

Government
  - Mayor: Stephan Oswald (ÖVP)

Area
  - Total: 49.21 km^{2} (19.00 sq mi)
- Elevation: 404 m (1,325 ft)

Population (2018-01-01)
  - Total: 3,571
  - Density: 72.57/km^{2} (187.9/sq mi)
- Time zone: UTC+1 (CET)
  - Summer (DST): UTC+2 (CEST)
- Postal code: 8511
- Area code: +43 3463
- Vehicle registration: DL
- Website: st-stefan-stainz.gv.at

Sankt Stefan ob Stainz is a municipality in the district of Deutschlandsberg in the Austrian state of Styria.

== Population ==
Historical population
Year	Pop.	±%
1869	3,321	—
1880	3,292	−0.9%
1890	3,368	+2.3%
1900	3,249	−3.5%
1910	3,378	+4.0%
1923	3,221	−4.6%
1934	3,554	+10.3%
1939	3,205	−9.8%
1951	3,378	+5.4%
1961	3,389	+0.3%
1971	3,486	+2.9%
1981	3,460	−0.7%
1991	3,508	+1.4%
2001	3,640	+3.8%
2011	3,625	−0.4%
2021	3,569	−1.5%
