= Wies, Austria =

Wies
- Municipality
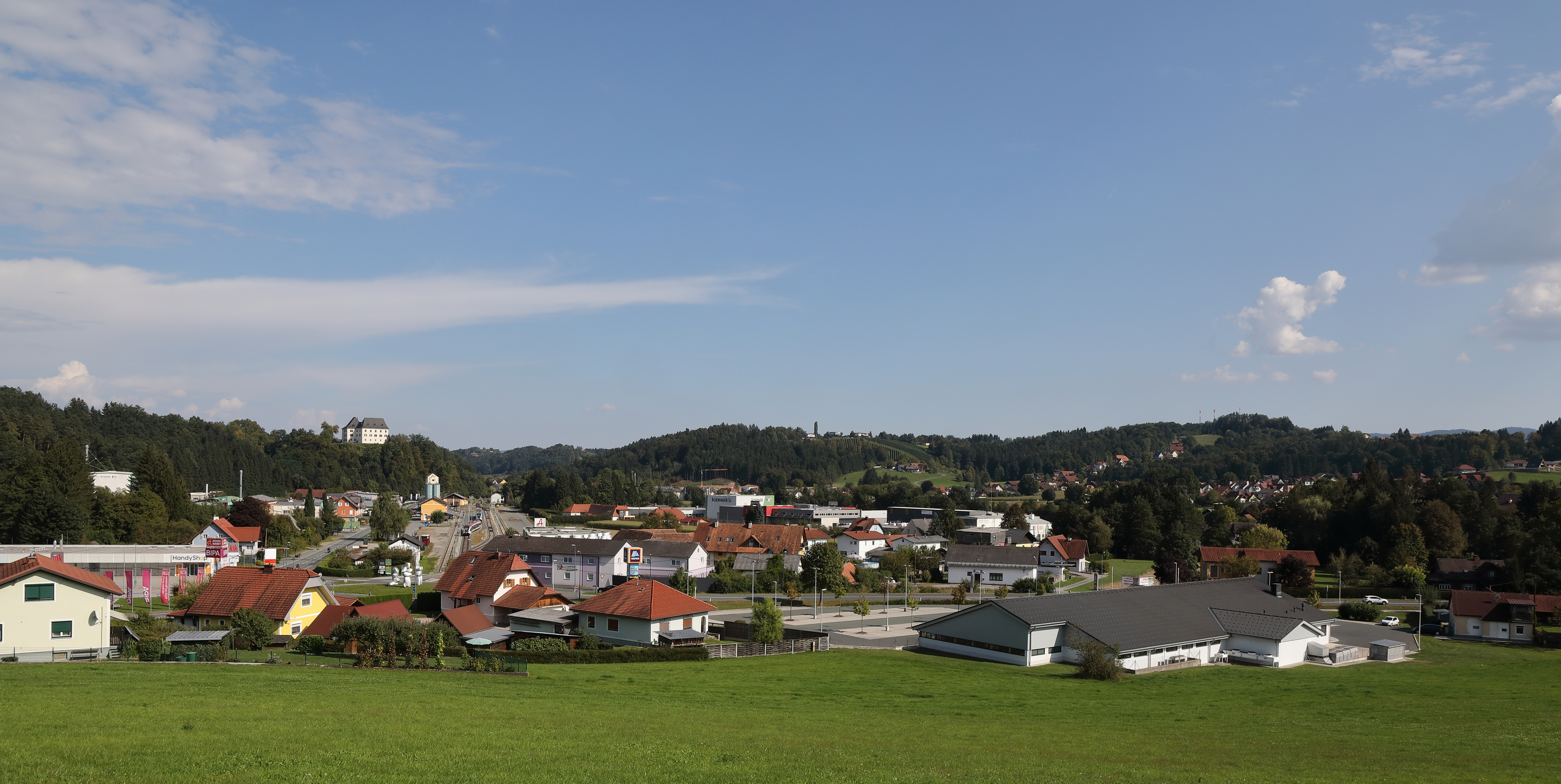
- View of Wies

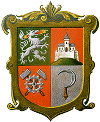
- Coat of arms

- Location within Austria
- Coordinates: 46°43′13″N 15°16′19″E
- Country: Austria
- State: Styria
- District: Deutschlandsberg

Government
  - Mayor: Josef Waltl (LAW)

Area
  - Total: 76.44 km^{2} (29.51 sq mi)
- Elevation: 341 m (1,119 ft)

Population (2018-01-01)
  - Total: 4,438
  - Density: 58.06/km^{2} (150.4/sq mi)
- Time zone: UTC+1 (CET)
  - Summer (DST): UTC+2 (CEST)
- Postal code: 8551
- Area code: 0 34 65
- Vehicle registration: DL
- Website: www.wies.at

Wies (German pronunciation: [viːs]) is a town in the district of Deutschlandsberg in the Austrian state of Styria.

== Population ==
Historical population
Year	Pop.	±%
1869	1,751	—
1880	2,063	+17.8%
1890	2,285	+10.8%
1900	2,286	+0.0%
1910	2,221	−2.8%
1923	2,272	+2.3%
1934	2,204	−3.0%
1939	2,083	−5.5%
1951	2,329	+11.8%
1961	2,268	−2.6%
1971	2,372	+4.6%
1981	2,434	+2.6%
1991	2,580	+6.0%
2001	2,484	−3.7%
2011	2,303	−7.3%
