= Styria municipal structural reform =

Local government reform in Austria

Map of Styrian municipalities after the 2015 reform. Thick lines are district borders.

The Styria municipal structural reform (German: Steiermärkische Gemeindestrukturreform) was a local government reform in the Austrian state of Styria, which was made effective January 1, 2015. The reform nearly halved the number of Styrian municipalities from 542 to 287. The reform was intended to reduce costs and ease election of new town officials. The terms of the reform is formalized in the Styrian Municipality Structural Reform Act. (StGsrG). The law was adopted on December 17, 2013 by the Landtag of Styria, and promulgated on April 2, 2014.

== Background ==
As a result of the reform, the number of municipalities in Styria was reduced from 542 to 287 municipalities, a decrease of 255. Though the main parts of the reform didn't come into effect until 1 January 2015, several changes happened before then: On 1 January 2013, the former Gemeinden (municipalities) of Buch-Geiseldorf and Sankt Magdalena am Lemberg were merged as the new municipality Buch-St. Magdalena. Likewise, the former municipalities of Gai and Hafning bei Trofaiach were incorporated into the municipality Trofaiach. Both were done before the actual reform, reducing the number of municipalities in Styria to 539.

In total, 385 of the old municipalities were affected in some way (by inclusion of other municipalities or parts of municipalities, territorial changes or resolution), and 157 municipalities (about 55% of the new municipalities) remained unchanged.

Leading up to the reform, there were plans to expand the City of Graz by incorporating several neighboring municipalities into it, but these plans were not carried out.

After the reform, 251 old community names remained (though some of these names were now held by expanded municipalities). The names of Kirchbach in der Steiermark and Neumarkt in der Steiermark merely added the definite article "der". Many new municipal names were either shortenings of old names, or combinations of old names. One new municipality, Sankt Barbara im Mürztal, was named for the patron saint of miners, as it was a merger of three old municipalities that were roughly equal in population and importance.

== New names of municipalities ==
As of October 2016, the reform has created 36 new town names, which are not just the largest of the former towns in each merger. The new names of municipalities include:

- Aflenz
- Buch-St. Magdalena
- Dobl-Zwaring
- Ehrenhausen an der Weinstraße
- Feistritztal
- Fernitz-Mellach
- Geistthal-Södingberg
- Gratwein-Straßengel
- Gutenberg-Stenzengreith
- Hirschegg-Pack
- Irdning-Donnersbachtal
- Kirchbach-Zerlach
- Krakau
- Leutschach an der Weinstraße
- Lobmingtal
- Michaelerberg-Pruggern
- Mitterberg-Sankt Martin
- Oberwölz
- Pischelsdorf am Kulm
- Pöls-Oberkurzheim
- Pölstal
- Premstätten
- Raaba-Grambach
- Sankt Barbara im Mürztal
- Sankt Magdalena am Lemberg
- Sankt Marein-Feistritz
- Sankt Veit in der Südsteiermark
- Schwarzautal
- Seiersberg-Pirka
- Söding-Sankt Johann
- Sölk
- Stadl-Predlitz
- Stainach-Pürgg
- Teufenbach-Katsch
- Tragöß-Sankt Katharein
- Waldbach-Mönichwald

== Detailed list of the new municipalities ==
From the formerly 539 independent communities (as of December 2014), these 287 new municipalities were formed on 1 January 2015 (157 unchanged municipalities are highlighted as dark gray, while 251 community names that continue to exist exactly, are in bold) [52]

The five municipalities Kohlberg, Limbach bei Neudau, Oberstorcha, Schlag bei Thalberg and Stocking are listed in the left column in each case twice, because their territory has been divided in two municipalities. In the second column, the former entire population is shown, but only the relevant part was added into the new sum.

Gnas was reconstituted from most parts (9 municipalities + 1 local part), and furthermore only Feldbach and Neumarkt in der Steiermark, from 7 parts each.

Old municipality names	Population before reform (1 Jan 2014)	New municipality names	Population after reform (1 Jan 2014)	District after reform
Aflenz Kurort	1,001	Aflenz	2,445	Bruck-Mürzzuschlag
Aflenz Land	1,444	Aflenz	2,445	Bruck-Mürzzuschlag
**Breitenau am Hochlantsch**	1,761	Breitenau am Hochlantsch	1,761	Bruck-Mürzzuschlag
**Bruck an der Mur**	12,541	Bruck an der Mur	15,730	Bruck-Mürzzuschlag
Oberaich	3,189	Bruck an der Mur	15,730	Bruck-Mürzzuschlag
**Kapfenberg**	21,503	Kapfenberg	23,235	Bruck-Mürzzuschlag
Parschlug	1,732	Kapfenberg	23,235	Bruck-Mürzzuschlag
Allerheiligen im Mürztal	1,953	Kindberg	8,243	Bruck-Mürzzuschlag
**Kindberg**	5,331	Kindberg	8,243	Bruck-Mürzzuschlag
Mürzhofen	959	Kindberg	8,243	Bruck-Mürzzuschlag
**Krieglach**	5,198	Krieglach	5,198	Bruck-Mürzzuschlag
**Langenwang**	3,926	Langenwang	3,926	Bruck-Mürzzuschlag
Gußwerk	1,227	Mariazell	3,997	Bruck-Mürzzuschlag
Halltal	321	Mariazell	3,997	Bruck-Mürzzuschlag
**Mariazell**	1,434	Mariazell	3,997	Bruck-Mürzzuschlag
Sankt Sebastian	1,015	Mariazell	3,997	Bruck-Mürzzuschlag
Ganz	346	Mürzzuschlag	8,814	Bruck-Mürzzuschlag
**Mürzzuschlag**	8,468	Mürzzuschlag	8,814	Bruck-Mürzzuschlag
Altenberg an der Rax	324	Neuberg an der Mürz	2,805	Bruck-Mürzzuschlag
Kapellen	643	Neuberg an der Mürz	2,805	Bruck-Mürzzuschlag
Mürzsteg	594	Neuberg an der Mürz	2,805	Bruck-Mürzzuschlag
**Neuberg an der Mürz**	1,244	Neuberg an der Mürz	2,805	Bruck-Mürzzuschlag
**Pernegg an der Mur**	2,345	Pernegg an der Mur	2,345	Bruck-Mürzzuschlag
Mitterdorf im Mürztal	2,378	Sankt Barbara im Mürztal	6,834	Bruck-Mürzzuschlag
Veitsch	2,417	Sankt Barbara im Mürztal	6,834	Bruck-Mürzzuschlag
Wartberg im Mürztal	2,039	Sankt Barbara im Mürztal	6,834	Bruck-Mürzzuschlag
**Sankt Lorenzen im Mürztal**	3,521	Sankt Lorenzen im Mürztal	3,521	Bruck-Mürzzuschlag
Frauenberg	147	Sankt Marein im Mürztal	2,704	Bruck-Mürzzuschlag
**Sankt Marein im Mürztal**	2,557	Sankt Marein im Mürztal	2,704	Bruck-Mürzzuschlag
**Spital am Semmering**	1,577	Spital am Semmering	1,577	Bruck-Mürzzuschlag
**Stanz im Mürztal**	1,857	Stanz im Mürztal	1,857	Bruck-Mürzzuschlag
Etmißl	479	Thörl	2,362	Bruck-Mürzzuschlag
Sankt Ilgen	275	Thörl	2,362	Bruck-Mürzzuschlag
**Thörl**	1,608	Thörl	2,362	Bruck-Mürzzuschlag
Sankt Katharein an der Laming	971	Tragöß-Sankt Katharein	1,952	Bruck-Mürzzuschlag
Tragöß	981	Tragöß-Sankt Katharein	1,952	Bruck-Mürzzuschlag
**Turnau**	1,549	Turnau	1,549	Bruck-Mürzzuschlag
Bad Gams	2,306	Deutschlandsberg	11,382	Deutschlandsberg
**Deutschlandsberg**	8,186	Deutschlandsberg	11,382	Deutschlandsberg
Freiland bei Deutschlandsberg	153	Deutschlandsberg	11,382	Deutschlandsberg
Kloster	194	Deutschlandsberg	11,382	Deutschlandsberg
Osterwitz	147	Deutschlandsberg	11,382	Deutschlandsberg
Trahütten	396	Deutschlandsberg	11,382	Deutschlandsberg
Aibl	1,386	Eibiswald	6,669	Deutschlandsberg
**Eibiswald**	1,437	Eibiswald	6,669	Deutschlandsberg
Großradl	1,397	Eibiswald	6,669	Deutschlandsberg
Pitschgau	1,568	Eibiswald	6,669	Deutschlandsberg
Sankt Oswald ob Eibiswald	562	Eibiswald	6,669	Deutschlandsberg
Soboth	319	Eibiswald	6,669	Deutschlandsberg
**Frauental an der Laßnitz**	2,888	Frauental an der Laßnitz	2,888	Deutschlandsberg
**Groß Sankt Florian**	2,891	Groß Sankt Florian	4,229	Deutschlandsberg
Unterbergla	1,338	Groß Sankt Florian	4,229	Deutschlandsberg
**Lannach**	3,337	Lannach	3,337	Deutschlandsberg
**Pölfing-Brunn**	1,635	Pölfing-Brunn	1,635	Deutschlandsberg
**Preding**	1,687	Preding	1,687	Deutschlandsberg
**Sankt Josef (Weststeiermark)**	1,438	Sankt Josef (Weststeiermark)	1,438	Deutschlandsberg
**Sankt Martin im Sulmtal**	1,781	Sankt Martin im Sulmtal	3,099	Deutschlandsberg
Sulmeck-Greith	1,318	Sankt Martin im Sulmtal	3,099	Deutschlandsberg
**Sankt Peter im Sulmtal**	1,336	Sankt Peter im Sulmtal	1,336	Deutschlandsberg
Greisdorf	966	Sankt Stefan ob Stainz	3,548	Deutschlandsberg
Gundersdorf	406	Sankt Stefan ob Stainz	3,548	Deutschlandsberg
**Sankt Stefan ob Stainz**	2,176	Sankt Stefan ob Stainz	3,548	Deutschlandsberg
Garanas	270	Schwanberg	4,665	Deutschlandsberg
Gressenberg	283	Schwanberg	4,665	Deutschlandsberg
Hollenegg	2,077	Schwanberg	4,665	Deutschlandsberg
**Schwanberg**	2,035	Schwanberg	4,665	Deutschlandsberg
Georgsberg	1,528	Stainz	8,554	Deutschlandsberg
Marhof	1,047	Stainz	8,554	Deutschlandsberg
Rassach	1,413	Stainz	8,554	Deutschlandsberg
**Stainz**	2,587	Stainz	8,554	Deutschlandsberg
Stainztal	1,444	Stainz	8,554	Deutschlandsberg
Stallhof	535	Stainz	8,554	Deutschlandsberg
**Wettmannstätten**	1,555	Wettmannstätten	1,555	Deutschlandsberg
Limberg bei Wies	950	Wies	4,444	Deutschlandsberg
Wernersdorf	634	Wies	4,444	Deutschlandsberg
Wielfresen	577	Wies	4,444	Deutschlandsberg
**Wies**	2,283	Wies	4,444	Deutschlandsberg
**Graz**	269,997	Graz	269,997	Graz
**Deutschfeistritz**	3,871	Deutschfeistritz	4,222	Graz-Umgebung
Großstübing	351	Deutschfeistritz	4,222	Graz-Umgebung
Dobl	1,805	Dobl-Zwaring	3,357	Graz-Umgebung
Zwaring-Pöls	1,552	Dobl-Zwaring	3,357	Graz-Umgebung
Brodingberg	1,277	Eggersdorf bei Graz	6,394	Graz-Umgebung
**Eggersdorf bei Graz**	2,139	Eggersdorf bei Graz	6,394	Graz-Umgebung
Hart-Purgstall	1,593	Eggersdorf bei Graz	6,394	Graz-Umgebung
Höf-Präbach	1,385	Eggersdorf bei Graz	6,394	Graz-Umgebung
**Feldkirchen bei Graz**	5,696	Feldkirchen bei Graz	5,696	Graz-Umgebung
Fernitz	3,300	Fernitz-Mellach	4,557	Graz-Umgebung
Mellach	1,257	Fernitz-Mellach	4,557	Graz-Umgebung
**Frohnleiten**	5,863	Frohnleiten	6,675	Graz-Umgebung
Röthelstein	210	Frohnleiten	6,675	Graz-Umgebung
Schrems bei Frohnleiten	602	Frohnleiten	6,675	Graz-Umgebung
**Gössendorf**	3,774	Gössendorf	3,774	Graz-Umgebung
**Gratkorn**	7,622	Gratkorn	7,622	Graz-Umgebung
Eisbach	2,955	Gratwein-Straßengel	12,811	Graz-Umgebung
Gratwein	3,664	Gratwein-Straßengel	12,811	Graz-Umgebung
Gschnaidt	341	Gratwein-Straßengel	12,811	Graz-Umgebung
Judendorf-Straßengel	5,851	Gratwein-Straßengel	12,811	Graz-Umgebung
**Hart bei Graz**	4,547	Hart bei Graz	4,547	Graz-Umgebung
**Haselsdorf-Tobelbad**	1,346	Haselsdorf-Tobelbad	1,346	Graz-Umgebung
**Hausmannstätten**	2,968	Hausmannstätten	2,968	Graz-Umgebung
Attendorf	1,831	Hitzendorf	6,895	Graz-Umgebung
**Hitzendorf**	3,643	Hitzendorf	6,895	Graz-Umgebung
Rohrbach-Steinberg	1,421	Hitzendorf	6,895	Graz-Umgebung
**Kainbach bei Graz**	2,699	Kainbach bei Graz	2,699	Graz-Umgebung
**Kalsdorf bei Graz**	6,120	Kalsdorf bei Graz	6,120	Graz-Umgebung
**Kumberg**	3,714	Kumberg	3,714	Graz-Umgebung
**Laßnitzhöhe**	2,620	Laßnitzhöhe	2,620	Graz-Umgebung
**Lieboch**	4,820	Lieboch	4,820	Graz-Umgebung
Edelsgrub	707	Nestelbach bei Graz	2,645	Graz-Umgebung
Langegg bei Graz	833	Nestelbach bei Graz	2,645	Graz-Umgebung
**Nestelbach bei Graz**	1,105	Nestelbach bei Graz	2,645	Graz-Umgebung
**Peggau**	2,144	Peggau	2,144	Graz-Umgebung
Grambach	1,758	Raaba-Grambach	4,026	Graz-Umgebung
Raaba	2,268	Raaba-Grambach	4,026	Graz-Umgebung
**Sankt Bartholomä**	1,400	Sankt Bartholomä	1,400	Graz-Umgebung
Krumegg	1,450	Sankt Marein bei Graz	3,627	Graz-Umgebung
Petersdorf II	877	Sankt Marein bei Graz	3,627	Graz-Umgebung
**Sankt Marein bei Graz**	1,300	Sankt Marein bei Graz	3,627	Graz-Umgebung
**Sankt Oswald bei Plankenwarth**	1,225	Sankt Oswald bei Plankenwarth	1,225	Graz-Umgebung
**Sankt Radegund bei Graz**	2,054	Sankt Radegund bei Graz	2,054	Graz-Umgebung
Pirka	3,286	Seiersberg-Pirka	10,637	Graz-Umgebung
Seiersberg	7,351	Seiersberg-Pirka	10,637	Graz-Umgebung
**Semriach**	3,292	Semriach	3,292	Graz-Umgebung
**Stattegg**	2,780	Stattegg	2,780	Graz-Umgebung
**Stiwoll**	719	Stiwoll	719	Graz-Umgebung
**Thal**	2,240	Thal	2,240	Graz-Umgebung
**Übelbach**	2,000	Übelbach	2,000	Graz-Umgebung
Unterpremstätten	3,964	Unterpremstätten-Zettling, seit 2016 Premstätten	5,534	Graz-Umgebung
Zettling	1,570	Unterpremstätten-Zettling, seit 2016 Premstätten	5,534	Graz-Umgebung
**Vasoldsberg**	4,328	Vasoldsberg	4,328	Graz-Umgebung
**Weinitzen**	2,596	Weinitzen	2,596	Graz-Umgebung
**Werndorf**	2,248	Werndorf	2,248	Graz-Umgebung
**Wundschuh**	1,539	Wundschuh	1,539	Graz-Umgebung
**Bad Blumau**	1,595	Bad Blumau	1,595	Hartberg-Fürstenfeld
**Bad Waltersdorf**	2,192	Bad Waltersdorf	3,704	Hartberg-Fürstenfeld
Limbach bei Neudau	351	Bad Waltersdorf	3,704	Hartberg-Fürstenfeld
Sebersdorf	1,407	Bad Waltersdorf	3,704	Hartberg-Fürstenfeld
**Burgau**	1,066	Burgau	1,066	Hartberg-Fürstenfeld
**Dechantskirchen**	1,627	Dechantskirchen	2,043	Hartberg-Fürstenfeld
Schlag bei Thalberg	911	Dechantskirchen	2,043	Hartberg-Fürstenfeld
**Ebersdorf**	1,229	Ebersdorf	1,229	Hartberg-Fürstenfeld
Blaindorf	668	Feistritztal	2,404	Hartberg-Fürstenfeld
Hirnsdorf	677	Feistritztal	2,404	Hartberg-Fürstenfeld
Kaibing	392	Feistritztal	2,404	Hartberg-Fürstenfeld
Sankt Johann bei Herberstein	380	Feistritztal	2,404	Hartberg-Fürstenfeld
Siegersdorf bei Herberstein	287	Feistritztal	2,404	Hartberg-Fürstenfeld
**Friedberg**	2,582	Friedberg	2,582	Hartberg-Fürstenfeld
Altenmarkt bei Fürstenfeld	1,134	Fürstenfeld	8,237	Hartberg-Fürstenfeld
**Fürstenfeld**	5,964	Fürstenfeld	8,237	Hartberg-Fürstenfeld
Übersbach	1,139	Fürstenfeld	8,237	Hartberg-Fürstenfeld
**Grafendorf bei Hartberg**	2,513	Grafendorf bei Hartberg	3,145	Hartberg-Fürstenfeld
Stambach	632	Grafendorf bei Hartberg	3,145	Hartberg-Fürstenfeld
**Greinbach**	1,783	Greinbach	1,783	Hartberg-Fürstenfeld
**Großsteinbach**	1,285	Großsteinbach	1,285	Hartberg-Fürstenfeld
**Großwilfersdorf**	1,401	Großwilfersdorf	2,017	Hartberg-Fürstenfeld
Hainersdorf	616	Großwilfersdorf	2,017	Hartberg-Fürstenfeld
**Hartberg**	6,449	Hartberg	6,449	Hartberg-Fürstenfeld
**Hartberg Umgebung**	2,226	Hartberg Umgebung	2,226	Hartberg-Fürstenfeld
Großhart	635	Hartl	2,133	Hartberg-Fürstenfeld
**Hartl**	808	Hartl	2,133	Hartberg-Fürstenfeld
Tiefenbach bei Kaindorf	690	Hartl	2,133	Hartberg-Fürstenfeld
**Ilz**	2,552	Ilz	3,693	Hartberg-Fürstenfeld
Nestelbach im Ilztal	1,141	Ilz	3,693	Hartberg-Fürstenfeld
Dienersdorf	690	Kaindorf	2,810	Hartberg-Fürstenfeld
Hofkirchen bei Hartberg	639	Kaindorf	2,810	Hartberg-Fürstenfeld
**Kaindorf**	1,481	Kaindorf	2,810	Hartberg-Fürstenfeld
**Lafnitz**	1,420	Lafnitz	1,420	Hartberg-Fürstenfeld
**Loipersdorf bei Fürstenfeld**	1,405	Loipersdorf bei Fürstenfeld	1,900	Hartberg-Fürstenfeld
Stein	495	Loipersdorf bei Fürstenfeld	1,900	Hartberg-Fürstenfeld
Limbach bei Neudau	351	Neudau	1,445	Hartberg-Fürstenfeld
**Neudau**	1,199	Neudau	1,445	Hartberg-Fürstenfeld
**Ottendorf an der Rittschein**	1,525	Ottendorf an der Rittschein	1,525	Hartberg-Fürstenfeld
**Pinggau**	3,126	Pinggau	3,126	Hartberg-Fürstenfeld
**Pöllau**	2,041	Pöllau	6,072	Hartberg-Fürstenfeld
Rabenwald	604	Pöllau	6,072	Hartberg-Fürstenfeld
Saifen-Boden	1,034	Pöllau	6,072	Hartberg-Fürstenfeld
Schönegg bei Pöllau	1,367	Pöllau	6,072	Hartberg-Fürstenfeld
Sonnhofen	1,026	Pöllau	6,072	Hartberg-Fürstenfeld
**Pöllauberg**	2,127	Pöllauberg	2,127	Hartberg-Fürstenfeld
**Rohr bei Hartberg**	1,103	Rohr bei Hartberg	1,482	Hartberg-Fürstenfeld
Wörth an der Lafnitz	379	Rohr bei Hartberg	1,482	Hartberg-Fürstenfeld
Eichberg	1,178	Rohrbach an der Lafnitz	2,719	Hartberg-Fürstenfeld
**Rohrbach an der Lafnitz**	1,046	Rohrbach an der Lafnitz	2,719	Hartberg-Fürstenfeld
Schlag bei Thalberg	911	Rohrbach an der Lafnitz	2,719	Hartberg-Fürstenfeld
**Sankt Jakob im Walde**	1,071	Sankt Jakob im Walde	1,071	Hartberg-Fürstenfeld
**Sankt Johann in der Haide**	2,043	Sankt Johann in der Haide	2,043	Hartberg-Fürstenfeld
**Sankt Lorenzen am Wechsel**	1,548	Sankt Lorenzen am Wechsel	1,548	Hartberg-Fürstenfeld
**Schäffern**	1,409	Schäffern	1,409	Hartberg-Fürstenfeld
**Söchau**	1,412	Söchau	1,412	Hartberg-Fürstenfeld
**Stubenberg**	2,278	Stubenberg	2,278	Hartberg-Fürstenfeld
Puchegg	551	Vorau	4,816	Hartberg-Fürstenfeld
Riegersberg	995	Vorau	4,816	Hartberg-Fürstenfeld
Schachen bei Vorau	1,174	Vorau	4,816	Hartberg-Fürstenfeld
**Vorau**	1,374	Vorau	4,816	Hartberg-Fürstenfeld
Vornholz	722	Vorau	4,816	Hartberg-Fürstenfeld
Mönichwald	864	Waldbach-Mönichwald	1,557	Hartberg-Fürstenfeld
Waldbach	693	Waldbach-Mönichwald	1,557	Hartberg-Fürstenfeld
**Wenigzell**	1,422	Wenigzell	1,422	Hartberg-Fürstenfeld
**Buch-St. Magdalena**	2,156	Buch-St. Magdalena	2,156	Hartberg-Fürstenfeld
**Allerheiligen bei Wildon**	1,425	Allerheiligen bei Wildon	1,425	Leibnitz
**Arnfels**	1,081	Arnfels	1,081	Leibnitz
Berghausen	632	Ehrenhausen an der Weinstraße	2,523	Leibnitz
Ehrenhausen	1,019	Ehrenhausen an der Weinstraße	2,523	Leibnitz
Ratsch an der Weinstraße	445	Ehrenhausen an der Weinstraße	2,523	Leibnitz
Retznei	427	Ehrenhausen an der Weinstraße	2,523	Leibnitz
**Empersdorf**	1,325	Empersdorf	1,325	Leibnitz
**Gabersdorf**	1,126	Gabersdorf	1,126	Leibnitz
**Gamlitz**	3,110	Gamlitz	3,236	Leibnitz
Sulztal an der Weinstraße	126	Gamlitz	3,236	Leibnitz
**Gleinstätten**	1,441	Gleinstätten	2,843	Leibnitz
Pistorf	1,402	Gleinstätten	2,843	Leibnitz
**Gralla**	2,188	Gralla	2,188	Leibnitz
**Großklein**	2,292	Großklein	2,292	Leibnitz
**Heiligenkreuz am Waasen**	1,924	Heiligenkreuz am Waasen	2,704	Leibnitz
Sankt Ulrich am Waasen	780	Heiligenkreuz am Waasen	2,704	Leibnitz
**Heimschuh**	1,999	Heimschuh	1,999	Leibnitz
**Hengsberg**	1,395	Hengsberg	1,395	Leibnitz
**Kitzeck im Sausal**	1,223	Kitzeck im Sausal	1,223	Leibnitz
**Lang**	1,231	Lang	1,231	Leibnitz
**Lebring-Sankt Margarethen**	2,028	Lebring-Sankt Margarethen	2,028	Leibnitz
Kaindorf an der Sulm	2,510	Leibnitz	11,314	Leibnitz
**Leibnitz**	7,853	Leibnitz	11,314	Leibnitz
Seggauberg	951	Leibnitz	11,314	Leibnitz
Eichberg-Trautenburg	773	Leutschach an der Weinstraße	3,811	Leibnitz
Glanz an der Weinstraße	1,395	Leutschach an der Weinstraße	3,811	Leibnitz
Leutschach	567	Leutschach an der Weinstraße	3,811	Leibnitz
Schloßberg	1,076	Leutschach an der Weinstraße	3,811	Leibnitz
**Oberhaag**	2,196	Oberhaag	2,196	Leibnitz
**Ragnitz**	1,481	Ragnitz	1,481	Leibnitz
**Sankt Andrä-Höch**	1,759	Sankt Andrä-Höch	1,759	Leibnitz
**Sankt Georgen an der Stiefing**	1,085	Sankt Georgen an der Stiefing	1,500	Leibnitz
Stocking	1,455	Sankt Georgen an der Stiefing	1,500	Leibnitz
**Sankt Johann im Saggautal**	2,037	Sankt Johann im Saggautal	2,037	Leibnitz
**Sankt Nikolai im Sausal**	2,206	Sankt Nikolai im Sausal	2,206	Leibnitz
Sankt Nikolai ob Draßling	1,097	Sankt Veit in der Südsteiermark	4,044	Leibnitz
Sankt Veit am Vogau	1,918	Sankt Veit in der Südsteiermark	4,044	Leibnitz
Weinburg am Saßbach	1,029	Sankt Veit in der Südsteiermark	4,044	Leibnitz
Breitenfeld am Tannenriegel	197	Schwarzautal	2,301	Leibnitz
Hainsdorf im Schwarzautal	289	Schwarzautal	2,301	Leibnitz
Mitterlabill	394	Schwarzautal	2,301	Leibnitz
Schwarzau im Schwarzautal	622	Schwarzautal	2,301	Leibnitz
Wolfsberg im Schwarzautal	799	Schwarzautal	2,301	Leibnitz
Obervogau	862	Straß-Spielfeld, seit 2016 Straß in Steiermark	4,742	Leibnitz
Spielfeld	968	Straß-Spielfeld, seit 2016 Straß in Steiermark	4,742	Leibnitz
Straß in Steiermark	1,797	Straß-Spielfeld, seit 2016 Straß in Steiermark	4,742	Leibnitz
Vogau	1,115	Straß-Spielfeld, seit 2016 Straß in Steiermark	4,742	Leibnitz
**Tillmitsch**	3,197	Tillmitsch	3,197	Leibnitz
**Wagna**	5,426	Wagna	5,426	Leibnitz
Stocking	1,455	Wildon	5,186	Leibnitz
Weitendorf	1,542	Wildon	5,186	Leibnitz
**Wildon**	2,604	Wildon	5,186	Leibnitz
**Eisenerz**	4,520	Eisenerz	4,520	Leoben
**Kalwang**	1,054	Kalwang	1,054	Leoben
**Kammern im Liesingtal**	1,645	Kammern im Liesingtal	1,645	Leoben
**Kraubath an der Mur**	1,277	Kraubath an der Mur	1,277	Leoben
**Leoben**	24,466	Leoben	24,466	Leoben
**Mautern in Steiermark**	1,814	Mautern in Steiermark	1,814	Leoben
**Niklasdorf**	2,560	Niklasdorf	2,560	Leoben
**Proleb**	1,537	Proleb	1,537	Leoben
**Radmer**	618	Radmer	618	Leoben
**Sankt Michael in Obersteiermark**	3,040	Sankt Michael in Obersteiermark	3,040	Leoben
**Sankt Peter-Freienstein**	2,419	Sankt Peter-Freienstein	2,419	Leoben
**Sankt Stefan ob Leoben**	1,933	Sankt Stefan ob Leoben	1,933	Leoben
**Traboch**	1,364	Traboch	1,364	Leoben
**Trofaiach**	11,190	Trofaiach	11,190	Leoben
**Vordernberg**	1,006	Vordernberg	1,006	Leoben
**Wald am Schoberpaß**	598	Wald am Schoberpaß	598	Leoben
**Admont**	2,508	Admont	4,988	Liezen
Hall	1,744	Admont	4,988	Liezen
Johnsbach	150	Admont	4,988	Liezen
Weng im Gesäuse	586	Admont	4,988	Liezen
**Aich**	920	Aich	1,205	Liezen
Gössenberg	285	Aich	1,205	Liezen
**Aigen im Ennstal**	2,557	Aigen im Ennstal	2,557	Liezen
**Altaussee**	1,825	Altaussee	1,825	Liezen
**Altenmarkt bei Sankt Gallen**	852	Altenmarkt bei Sankt Gallen	852	Liezen
**Ardning**	1,197	Ardning	1,197	Liezen
**Bad Aussee**	4,779	Bad Aussee	4,779	Liezen
**Bad Mitterndorf**	3,127	Bad Mitterndorf	4,875	Liezen
Pichl-Kainisch	743	Bad Mitterndorf	4,875	Liezen
Tauplitz	1,005	Bad Mitterndorf	4,875	Liezen
**Gaishorn am See**	997	Gaishorn am See	1,363	Liezen
Treglwang	366	Gaishorn am See	1,363	Liezen
**Gröbming**	2,803	Gröbming	2,803	Liezen
**Grundlsee**	1,219	Grundlsee	1,219	Liezen
**Haus**	2,402	Haus	2,402	Liezen
Donnersbach	1,085	Irdning-Donnersbachtal	4,148	Liezen
Donnersbachwald	314	Irdning-Donnersbachtal	4,148	Liezen
Irdning	2,749	Irdning-Donnersbachtal	4,148	Liezen
Gams bei Hieflau	561	Landl	2,943	Liezen
Hieflau	730	Landl	2,943	Liezen
**Landl**	1,258	Landl	2,943	Liezen
Palfau	394	Landl	2,943	Liezen
**Lassing**	1,667	Lassing	1,667	Liezen
**Liezen**	6,865	Liezen	7,982	Liezen
Weißenbach bei Liezen	1,117	Liezen	7,982	Liezen
Michaelerberg	551	Michaelerberg-Pruggern	1,174	Liezen
Pruggern	623	Michaelerberg-Pruggern	1,174	Liezen
Mitterberg	1,157	Mitterberg-Sankt Martin	1,931	Liezen
Sankt Martin am Grimming	774	Mitterberg-Sankt Martin	1,931	Liezen
Niederöblarn	598	Öblarn	2,045	Liezen
**Öblarn**	1,447	Öblarn	2,045	Liezen
**Ramsau am Dachstein**	2,766	Ramsau am Dachstein	2,766	Liezen
Oppenberg	242	Rottenmann	5,283	Liezen
**Rottenmann**	5,041	Rottenmann	5,283	Liezen
**Sankt Gallen**	1,396	Sankt Gallen	1,879	Liezen
Weißenbach an der Enns	483	Sankt Gallen	1,879	Liezen
Pichl-Preunegg	898	Schladming	6,676	Liezen
Rohrmoos-Untertal	1,376	Schladming	6,676	Liezen
**Schladming**	4,402	Schladming	6,676	Liezen
**Selzthal**	1,641	Selzthal	1,641	Liezen
Großsölk	489	Sölk	1,557	Liezen
Kleinsölk	583	Sölk	1,557	Liezen
Sankt Nikolai im Sölktal	485	Sölk	1,557	Liezen
Pürgg-Trautenfels	891	Stainach-Pürgg	2,848	Liezen
Stainach	1,957	Stainach-Pürgg	2,848	Liezen
**Trieben**	3,353	Trieben	3,353	Liezen
**Wildalpen**	500	Wildalpen	500	Liezen
**Wörschach**	1,165	Wörschach	1,165	Liezen
Krakaudorf	645	Krakau	1,495	Murau
Krakauhintermühlen	533	Krakau	1,495	Murau
Krakauschatten	317	Krakau	1,495	Murau
**Mühlen**	904	Mühlen	904	Murau
Laßnitz bei Murau	1,036	Murau	3,758	Murau
**Murau**	2,131	Murau	3,758	Murau
Stolzalpe	457	Murau	3,758	Murau
Triebendorf	134	Murau	3,758	Murau
Dürnstein in der Steiermark	278	Neumarkt in der Steiermark	5,072	Murau
Kulm am Zirbitz	308	Neumarkt in der Steiermark	5,072	Murau
Mariahof	1,352	Neumarkt in der Steiermark	5,072	Murau
Neumarkt in Steiermark	1,690	Neumarkt in der Steiermark	5,072	Murau
Perchau am Sattel	301	Neumarkt in der Steiermark	5,072	Murau
Sankt Marein bei Neumarkt	932	Neumarkt in der Steiermark	5,072	Murau
Zeutschach	211	Neumarkt in der Steiermark	5,072	Murau
**Niederwölz**	617	Niederwölz	617	Murau
Oberwölz Stadt	987	Oberwölz	3,049	Murau
Oberwölz Umgebung	777	Oberwölz	3,049	Murau
Schönberg-Lachtal	429	Oberwölz	3,049	Murau
Winklern bei Oberwölz	856	Oberwölz	3,049	Murau
**Ranten**	1,037	Ranten	1,184	Murau
Rinegg	147	Ranten	1,184	Murau
Sankt Georgen ob Murau	1,387	Sankt Georgen am Kreischberg	1,851	Murau
St. Ruprecht-Falkendorf	464	Sankt Georgen am Kreischberg	1,851	Murau
Sankt Blasen	552	Sankt Lambrecht	1,948	Murau
**Sankt Lambrecht**	1,396	Sankt Lambrecht	1,948	Murau
Sankt Lorenzen bei Scheifling	634	Scheifling	2,186	Murau
**Scheifling**	1,552	Scheifling	2,186	Murau
**Schöder**	981	Schöder	981	Murau
**St. Peter am Kammersberg**	2,063	St. Peter am Kammersberg	2,063	Murau
Predlitz-Turrach	822	Stadl-Predlitz	1,790	Murau
Stadl an der Mur	968	Stadl-Predlitz	1,790	Murau
Frojach-Katsch	1,155	Teufenbach-Katsch	1,842	Murau
Teufenbach	687	Teufenbach-Katsch	1,842	Murau
**Fohnsdorf**	7,813	Fohnsdorf	7,813	Murtal
**Gaal**	1,453	Gaal	1,453	Murtal
**Großlobming**	1,215	Großlobming, seit 2016 Lobmingtal	1,846	Murtal
Kleinlobming	631	Großlobming, seit 2016 Lobmingtal	1,846	Murtal
**Hohentauern**	434	Hohentauern	434	Murtal
**Judenburg**	9,191	Judenburg	10,141	Murtal
Oberweg	574	Judenburg	10,141	Murtal
Reifling	376	Judenburg	10,141	Murtal
Apfelberg	1,145	Knittelfeld	12,446	Murtal
**Knittelfeld**	11,301	Knittelfeld	12,446	Murtal
**Kobenz**	1,830	Kobenz	1,830	Murtal
Amering	1,080	Obdach	3,876	Murtal
**Obdach**	2,033	Obdach	3,876	Murtal
Sankt Anna am Lavantegg	388	Obdach	3,876	Murtal
Sankt Wolfgang-Kienberg	375	Obdach	3,876	Murtal
Oberkurzheim	694	Pöls-Oberkurzheim	3,061	Murtal
Pöls	2,367	Pöls-Oberkurzheim	3,061	Murtal
Bretstein	302	Pölstal	2,768	Murtal
Oberzeiring	834	Pölstal	2,768	Murtal
Sankt Johann am Tauern	476	Pölstal	2,768	Murtal
Sankt Oswald-Möderbrugg	1,156	Pölstal	2,768	Murtal
**Pusterwald**	485	Pusterwald	485	Murtal
**Sankt Georgen ob Judenburg**	875	Sankt Georgen ob Judenburg	875	Murtal
Feistritz bei Knittelfeld	789	Sankt Marein-Feistritz	2,034	Murtal
Sankt Marein bei Knittelfeld	1,245	Sankt Marein-Feistritz	2,034	Murtal
Rachau	613	Sankt Margarethen bei Knittelfeld	2,715	Murtal
Sankt Lorenzen bei Knittelfeld	804	Sankt Margarethen bei Knittelfeld	2,715	Murtal
**Sankt Margarethen bei Knittelfeld**	1,298	Sankt Margarethen bei Knittelfeld	2,715	Murtal
**Sankt Peter ob Judenburg**	1,072	Sankt Peter ob Judenburg	1,072	Murtal
**Seckau**	1,285	Seckau	1,285	Murtal
Flatschach	192	Spielberg	5,295	Murtal
**Spielberg**	5,103	Spielberg	5,295	Murtal
**Unzmarkt-Frauenburg**	1,393	Unzmarkt-Frauenburg	1,393	Murtal
Eppenstein	1,217	Weißkirchen in Steiermark	4,916	Murtal
Maria Buch-Feistritz	2,244	Weißkirchen in Steiermark	4,916	Murtal
Reisstraße	167	Weißkirchen in Steiermark	4,916	Murtal
**Weißkirchen in Steiermark**	1,288	Weißkirchen in Steiermark	4,916	Murtal
**Zeltweg**	7,303	Zeltweg	7,303	Murtal
**Bad Gleichenberg**	2,221	Bad Gleichenberg	5,278	Südoststeiermark
Bairisch Kölldorf	1,038	Bad Gleichenberg	5,278	Südoststeiermark
Merkendorf	1,143	Bad Gleichenberg	5,278	Südoststeiermark
Trautmannsdorf in Oststeiermark	876	Bad Gleichenberg	5,278	Südoststeiermark
**Bad Radkersburg**	1,317	Bad Radkersburg	3,064	Südoststeiermark
Radkersburg Umgebung	1,747	Bad Radkersburg	3,064	Südoststeiermark
**Deutsch Goritz**	1,239	Deutsch Goritz	1,848	Südoststeiermark
Ratschendorf	609	Deutsch Goritz	1,848	Südoststeiermark
**Edelsbach bei Feldbach**	1,338	Edelsbach bei Feldbach	1,338	Südoststeiermark
**Eichkögl**	1,241	Eichkögl	1,241	Südoststeiermark
**Fehring**	2,996	Fehring	7,338	Südoststeiermark
Hatzendorf	1,751	Fehring	7,338	Südoststeiermark
Hohenbrugg-Weinberg	973	Fehring	7,338	Südoststeiermark
Johnsdorf-Brunn	808	Fehring	7,338	Südoststeiermark
Pertlstein	810	Fehring	7,338	Südoststeiermark
Auersbach	867	Feldbach	12,989	Südoststeiermark
**Feldbach**	4,646	Feldbach	12,989	Südoststeiermark
Gniebing-Weißenbach	2,194	Feldbach	12,989	Südoststeiermark
Gossendorf	884	Feldbach	12,989	Südoststeiermark
Leitersdorf im Raabtal	677	Feldbach	12,989	Südoststeiermark
Mühldorf bei Feldbach	3,145	Feldbach	12,989	Südoststeiermark
Raabau	576	Feldbach	12,989	Südoststeiermark
Aug-Radisch	280	Gnas	6,016	Südoststeiermark
Baumgarten bei Gnas	541	Gnas	6,016	Südoststeiermark
**Gnas**	1,913	Gnas	6,016	Südoststeiermark
Grabersdorf	345	Gnas	6,016	Südoststeiermark
Kohlberg	506	Gnas	6,016	Südoststeiermark
Maierdorf	514	Gnas	6,016	Südoststeiermark
Poppendorf	689	Gnas	6,016	Südoststeiermark
Raning	795	Gnas	6,016	Südoststeiermark
Trössing	269	Gnas	6,016	Südoststeiermark
Unterauersbach	442	Gnas	6,016	Südoststeiermark
**Halbenrain**	1,752	Halbenrain	1,752	Südoststeiermark
**Jagerberg**	1,671	Jagerberg	1,671	Südoststeiermark
**Kapfenstein**	1,598	Kapfenstein	1,598	Südoststeiermark
Kirchbach in Steiermark	1,543	Kirchbach in der Steiermark, seit 2016 Kirchbach-Zerlach	3,233	Südoststeiermark
Zerlach	1,690	Kirchbach in der Steiermark, seit 2016 Kirchbach-Zerlach	3,233	Südoststeiermark
Fladnitz im Raabtal	755	Kirchberg an der Raab	4,389	Südoststeiermark
**Kirchberg an der Raab**	2,073	Kirchberg an der Raab	4,389	Südoststeiermark
Oberdorf am Hochegg	724	Kirchberg an der Raab	4,389	Südoststeiermark
Oberstorcha	620	Kirchberg an der Raab	4,389	Südoststeiermark
Studenzen	704	Kirchberg an der Raab	4,389	Südoststeiermark
**Klöch**	1,220	Klöch	1,220	Südoststeiermark
**Mettersdorf am Saßbach**	1,292	Mettersdorf am Saßbach	1,292	Südoststeiermark
Eichfeld	879	Mureck	3,582	Südoststeiermark
Gosdorf	1,152	Mureck	3,582	Südoststeiermark
**Mureck**	1,551	Mureck	3,582	Südoststeiermark
**Murfeld**	1,675	Murfeld	1,675	Südoststeiermark
Kohlberg	506	Paldau	3,208	Südoststeiermark
Oberstorcha	620	Paldau	3,208	Südoststeiermark
**Paldau**	2,102	Paldau	3,208	Südoststeiermark
Perlsdorf	341	Paldau	3,208	Südoststeiermark
Edelstauden	451	Pirching am Traubenberg	2,594	Südoststeiermark
Frannach	548	Pirching am Traubenberg	2,594	Südoststeiermark
**Pirching am Traubenberg**	1,595	Pirching am Traubenberg	2,594	Südoststeiermark
Breitenfeld an der Rittschein	788	Riegersburg	4,948	Südoststeiermark
Kornberg bei Riegersburg	1,143	Riegersburg	4,948	Südoststeiermark
Lödersdorf	711	Riegersburg	4,948	Südoststeiermark
**Riegersburg**	2,306	Riegersburg	4,948	Südoststeiermark
Frutten-Gießelsdorf	620	Sankt Anna am Aigen	2,366	Südoststeiermark
**Sankt Anna am Aigen**	1,746	Sankt Anna am Aigen	2,366	Südoststeiermark
Bierbaum am Auersbach	463	Sankt Peter am Ottersbach	3,043	Südoststeiermark
Dietersdorf am Gnasbach	373	Sankt Peter am Ottersbach	3,043	Südoststeiermark
**Sankt Peter am Ottersbach**	2,207	Sankt Peter am Ottersbach	3,043	Südoststeiermark
Glojach	242	Sankt Stefan im Rosental	4,016	Südoststeiermark
**Sankt Stefan im Rosental**	3,774	Sankt Stefan im Rosental	4,016	Südoststeiermark
Hof bei Straden	846	Straden	3,691	Südoststeiermark
Krusdorf	389	Straden	3,691	Südoststeiermark
Stainz bei Straden	946	Straden	3,691	Südoststeiermark
**Straden**	1,510	Straden	3,691	Südoststeiermark
**Tieschen**	1,306	Tieschen	1,306	Südoststeiermark
**Unterlamm**	1,225	Unterlamm	1,225	Südoststeiermark
**Bärnbach**	5,224	Bärnbach	5,591	Voitsberg
Piberegg	367	Bärnbach	5,591	Voitsberg
**Edelschrott**	1,583	Edelschrott	1,787	Voitsberg
Modriach	204	Edelschrott	1,787	Voitsberg
Geistthal	807	Geistthal-Södingberg	1,630	Voitsberg
Södingberg	823	Geistthal-Södingberg	1,630	Voitsberg
Hirschegg	653	Hirschegg-Pack	1,067	Voitsberg
Pack	414	Hirschegg-Pack	1,067	Voitsberg
Gallmannsegg	305	Kainach bei Voitsberg	1,671	Voitsberg
**Kainach bei Voitsberg**	664	Kainach bei Voitsberg	1,671	Voitsberg
Kohlschwarz	702	Kainach bei Voitsberg	1,671	Voitsberg
Graden	475	Köflach	10,042	Voitsberg
**Köflach**	9,567	Köflach	10,042	Voitsberg
**Krottendorf-Gaisfeld**	2,433	Krottendorf-Gaisfeld	2,433	Voitsberg
**Ligist**	3,207	Ligist	3,207	Voitsberg
Gößnitz	441	Maria Lankowitz	2,921	Voitsberg
**Maria Lankowitz**	2,197	Maria Lankowitz	2,921	Voitsberg
Salla	283	Maria Lankowitz	2,921	Voitsberg
**Mooskirchen**	2,106	Mooskirchen	2,106	Voitsberg
**Rosental an der Kainach**	1,687	Rosental an der Kainach	1,687	Voitsberg
**Sankt Martin am Wöllmißberg**	811	Sankt Martin am Wöllmißberg	811	Voitsberg
Sankt Johann-Köppling	1,795	Söding-Sankt Johann	3,981	Voitsberg
Söding	2,186	Söding-Sankt Johann	3,981	Voitsberg
**Stallhofen**	3,130	Stallhofen	3,130	Voitsberg
**Voitsberg**	9,535	Voitsberg	9,535	Voitsberg
**Albersdorf-Prebuch**	2,000	Albersdorf-Prebuch	2,000	Weiz
**Anger**	829	Anger	4,126	Weiz
Baierdorf bei Anger	1,632	Anger	4,126	Weiz
Feistritz bei Anger	1,069	Anger	4,126	Weiz
Naintsch	596	Anger	4,126	Weiz
**Birkfeld**	1,610	Birkfeld	5,139	Weiz
Gschaid bei Birkfeld	930	Birkfeld	5,139	Weiz
Haslau bei Birkfeld	440	Birkfeld	5,139	Weiz
Koglhof	1,094	Birkfeld	5,139	Weiz
Waisenegg	1,065	Birkfeld	5,139	Weiz
**Fischbach**	1,526	Fischbach	1,526	Weiz
**Fladnitz an der Teichalm**	1,170	Fladnitz an der Teichalm	1,836	Weiz
Tulwitz	508	Fladnitz an der Teichalm	1,836	Weiz
Tyrnau	158	Fladnitz an der Teichalm	1,836	Weiz
**Floing**	1,209	Floing	1,209	Weiz
**Gasen**	942	Gasen	942	Weiz
**Gersdorf an der Feistritz**	1,203	Gersdorf an der Feistritz	1,681	Weiz
Oberrettenbach	478	Gersdorf an der Feistritz	1,681	Weiz
**Gleisdorf**	5,869	Gleisdorf	10,067	Weiz
Labuch	809	Gleisdorf	10,067	Weiz
Laßnitzthal	1,070	Gleisdorf	10,067	Weiz
Nitscha	1,453	Gleisdorf	10,067	Weiz
Ungerdorf	866	Gleisdorf	10,067	Weiz
Gutenberg an der Raabklamm	1,234	Gutenberg-Stenzengreith	1,755	Weiz
Stenzengreith	521	Gutenberg-Stenzengreith	1,755	Weiz
**Hofstätten an der Raab**	2,117	Hofstätten an der Raab	2,117	Weiz
**Ilztal**	1,743	Ilztal	2,148	Weiz
Preßguts	405	Ilztal	2,148	Weiz
**Ludersdorf-Wilfersdorf**	2,176	Ludersdorf-Wilfersdorf	2,176	Weiz
**Markt Hartmannsdorf**	2,982	Markt Hartmannsdorf	2,982	Weiz
**Miesenbach bei Birkfeld**	742	Miesenbach bei Birkfeld	742	Weiz
**Mitterdorf an der Raab**	2,091	Mitterdorf an der Raab	2,091	Weiz
**Mortantsch**	2,032	Mortantsch	2,032	Weiz
**Naas**	1,390	Naas	1,390	Weiz
Arzberg	544	Passail	4,316	Weiz
Hohenau an der Raab	1,331	Passail	4,316	Weiz
Neudorf bei Passail	480	Passail	4,316	Weiz
**Passail**	1,961	Passail	4,316	Weiz
Kulm bei Weiz	486	Pischelsdorf am Kulm	3,667	Weiz
Pischelsdorf in der Steiermark	2,556	Pischelsdorf am Kulm	3,667	Weiz
Reichendorf	625	Pischelsdorf am Kulm	3,667	Weiz
**Puch bei Weiz**	2,085	Puch bei Weiz	2,085	Weiz
**Ratten**	1,179	Ratten	1,179	Weiz
**Rettenegg**	749	Rettenegg	749	Weiz
**Sankt Kathrein am Offenegg**	1,136	Sankt Kathrein am Offenegg	1,136	Weiz
Etzersdorf-Rollsdorf	1,108	Sankt Ruprecht an der Raab	4,927	Weiz
**Sankt Ruprecht an der Raab**	2,244	Sankt Ruprecht an der Raab	4,927	Weiz
Unterfladnitz	1,575	Sankt Ruprecht an der Raab	4,927	Weiz
**Sinabelkirchen**	4,081	Sinabelkirchen	4,081	Weiz
**St. Kathrein am Hauenstein**	676	St. Kathrein am Hauenstein	676	Weiz
**St. Margarethen an der Raab**	3,954	St. Margarethen an der Raab	3,954	Weiz
**Strallegg**	1,951	Strallegg	1,951	Weiz
**Thannhausen**	2,362	Thannhausen	2,362	Weiz
Krottendorf	2,383	Weiz	11,302	Weiz
**Weiz**	8,919	Weiz	11,302	Weiz

- The number of inhabitants of the newly formed municipalities equal to the combined populations of all member municipalities as of 1 January 2014. Since five formerly independent municipalities were divided into two different new towns, the listed populations of these newly formed municipalities are not yet definitively applicable. The new data, as of 1 January 2015, from Statistik Austria are stored at Template:Metadata population AT-6.

The new municipalities mostly took the name of only one of the old municipalities that they were created from. In 21 cases, two old names (or parts of old names) were put together with a hyphen, new names were created by rewording (Ehrenhausen an der Weinstraße, Leutschach an der Weinstraße, Pischelsdorf am Kulm, Sankt Georgen am Kreischberg, Sankt Veit in der Südsteiermark) or by simplifying (Aflenz, Krakau, Oberwölz, Schwarzautal, Sölk) from the core term of two. Kirchberg in der Steiermark and Neumarkt in der Steiermark's names were only changed by adding the article "der". For Feistritztal, Pölstal and St. Barbara in Mürztal entirely new names were chosen for the new municipality. For Hieflau and others, the district boundaries have been moved.
