= Edelstauden =

- Former municipality
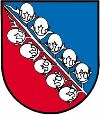
- Coat of arms

- Location within Austria
- Coordinates: 46°58′00″N 15°37′00″E
- Country: Austria
- State: Styria
- District: Südoststeiermark

Area
  - Total: 6.75 km^{2} (2.61 sq mi)
- Elevation: 367 m (1,204 ft)

Population (1 January 2016)
  - Total: 452
  - Density: 67.0/km^{2} (173/sq mi)
- Time zone: UTC+1 (CET)
  - Summer (DST): UTC+2 (CEST)
- Postal code: 8081
- Area code: +43 3134
- Vehicle registration: FB
- Website: www.edelstauden.gv.at

Edelstauden is a former municipality in the district of Südoststeiermark in the Austrian state of Styria. Since the 2015 Styria municipal structural reform, it is part of the municipality Pirching am Traubenberg.

== Population ==
Historical population
Year	Pop.	±%
1869	474	—
1880	504	+6.3%
1890	497	−1.4%
1900	468	−5.8%
1910	507	+8.3%
1923	465	−8.3%
1934	441	−5.2%
1939	432	−2.0%
1951	417	−3.5%
1961	402	−3.6%
1971	412	+2.5%
1981	410	−0.5%
1991	420	+2.4%
2001	414	−1.4%
2013	456	+10.1%
