= Krusdorf =

- Former municipality
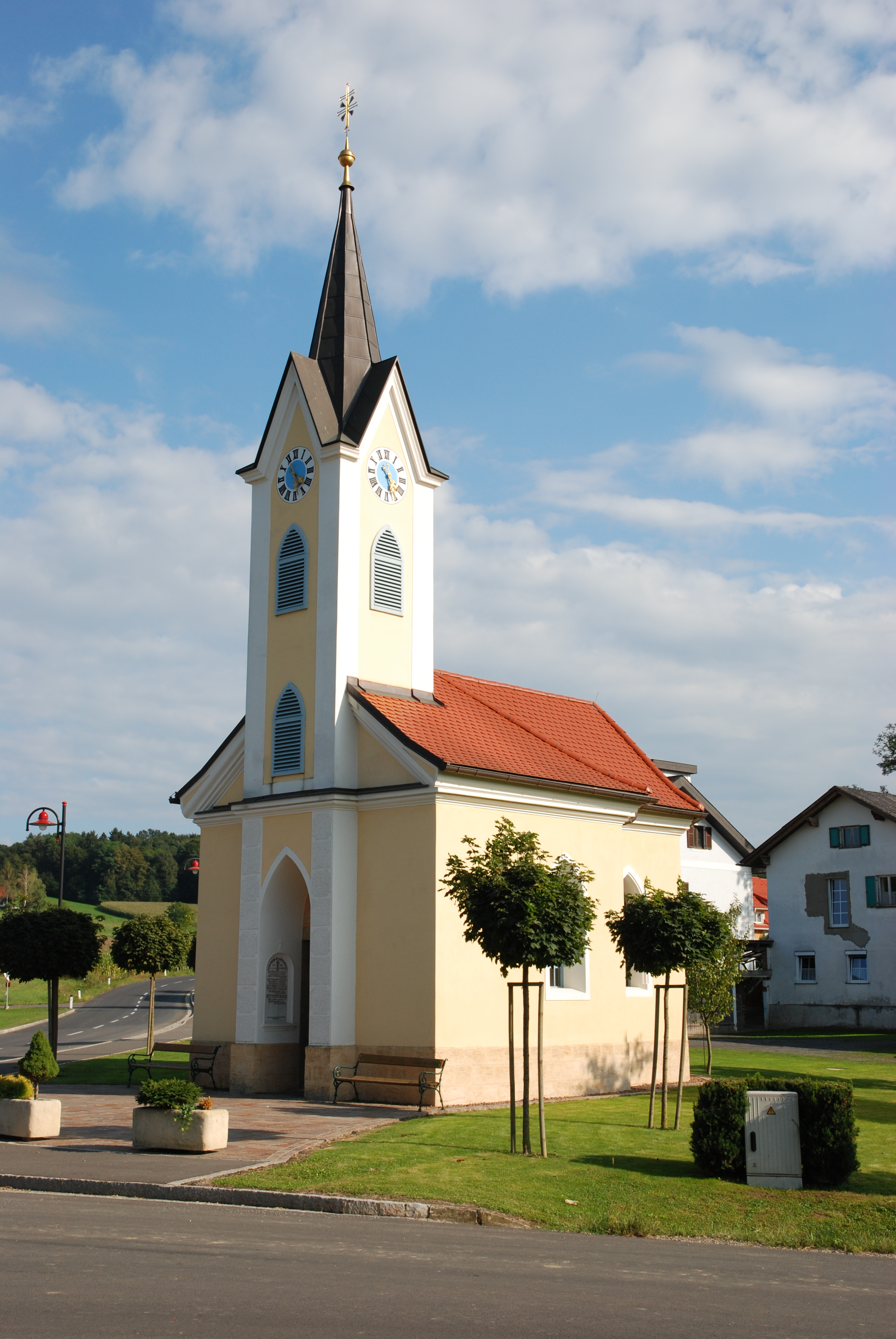
- Chapel in Krusdorf

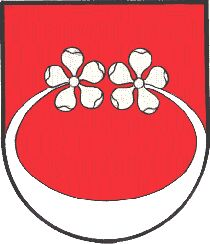
- Coat of arms

- Location within Austria
- Coordinates: 46°50′00″N 15°52′00″E
- Country: Austria
- State: Styria
- District: Südoststeiermark

Area
  - Total: 5.95 km^{2} (2.30 sq mi)
- Elevation: 270 m (890 ft)

Population (1 January 2016)
  - Total: 398
  - Density: 66.9/km^{2} (173/sq mi)
- Time zone: UTC+1 (CET)
  - Summer (DST): UTC+2 (CEST)
- Postal code: 8345
- Area code: +43 3473
- Vehicle registration: FB
- Website: www.krusdorf.steiermark.at

Krusdorf is a former municipality in the district of Südoststeiermark in the Austrian state of Styria. Since the 2015 Styria municipal structural reform, it is part of the municipality Straden.

== Population ==
Historical population
Year	Pop.	±%
1869	495	—
1880	507	+2.4%
1890	510	+0.6%
1900	490	−3.9%
1910	469	−4.3%
1923	471	+0.4%
1934	503	+6.8%
1939	446	−11.3%
1951	475	+6.5%
1961	406	−14.5%
1971	446	+9.9%
1981	445	−0.2%
1991	430	−3.4%
2001	394	−8.4%
2013	394	+0.0%
