= Lödersdorf =

- Former municipality
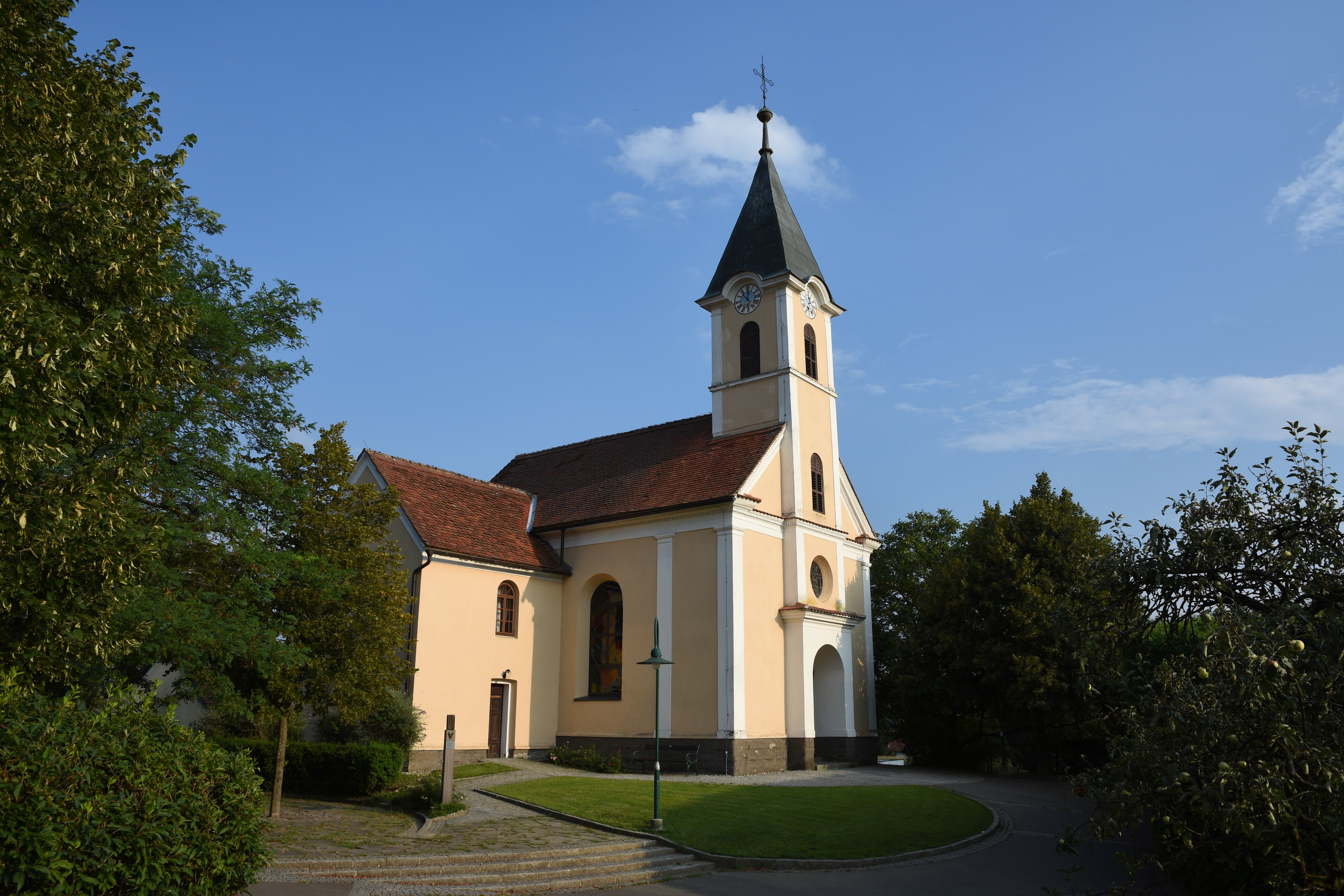
- Catholic church in Lödersdorf

- Location within Austria
- Coordinates: 46°57′00″N 15°57′00″E
- Country: Austria
- State: Styria
- District: Südoststeiermark

Area
  - Total: 9.81 km^{2} (3.79 sq mi)
- Elevation: 280 m (920 ft)

Population (1 January 2016)
  - Total: 705
  - Density: 71.9/km^{2} (186/sq mi)
- Time zone: UTC+1 (CET)
  - Summer (DST): UTC+2 (CEST)
- Postal code: 8334
- Area code: +43 3152
- Vehicle registration: FB
- Website: www.loedersdorf. steiermark.at

Lödersdorf is a former municipality in the district of Südoststeiermark in the Austrian state of Styria. Since the 2015 Styria municipal structural reform, it is part of the municipality Riegersburg.

== Population ==
Historical population
Year	Pop.	±%
1869	723	—
1880	742	+2.6%
1890	796	+7.3%
1900	813	+2.1%
1910	831	+2.2%
1923	818	−1.6%
1934	810	−1.0%
1939	762	−5.9%
1951	740	−2.9%
1961	677	−8.5%
1971	695	+2.7%
1981	654	−5.9%
1991	640	−2.1%
2001	678	+5.9%
2013	718	+5.9%
