= Aug-Radisch =

- Former municipality
- Location within Austria
- Coordinates: 46°51′00″N 15°47′00″E
- Country: Austria
- State: Styria
- District: Südoststeiermark

Area
  - Total: 4.48 km^{2} (1.73 sq mi)
- Elevation: 300 m (980 ft)

Population (1 January 2016)
  - Total: 289
  - Density: 64.5/km^{2} (167/sq mi)
- Time zone: UTC+1 (CET)
  - Summer (DST): UTC+2 (CEST)
- Postal code: 8342
- Area code: +43 3151
- Vehicle registration: FB
- Website: www.aug-radisch.steiermark.at

Aug-Radisch is a former municipality in the district of Südoststeiermark in Austrian state of Styria. Since the 2015 Styria municipal structural reform, it is part of the municipality Gnas.

== Population ==
Historical population
Year	Pop.	±%
1869	402	—
1880	394	−2.0%
1890	395	+0.3%
1900	365	−7.6%
1910	299	−18.1%
1923	330	+10.4%
1934	305	−7.6%
1939	306	+0.3%
1951	302	−1.3%
1961	270	−10.6%
1971	305	+13.0%
1981	312	+2.3%
1991	311	−0.3%
2001	308	−1.0%
2012	289	−6.2%
