= Riegersberg =

- Former municipality
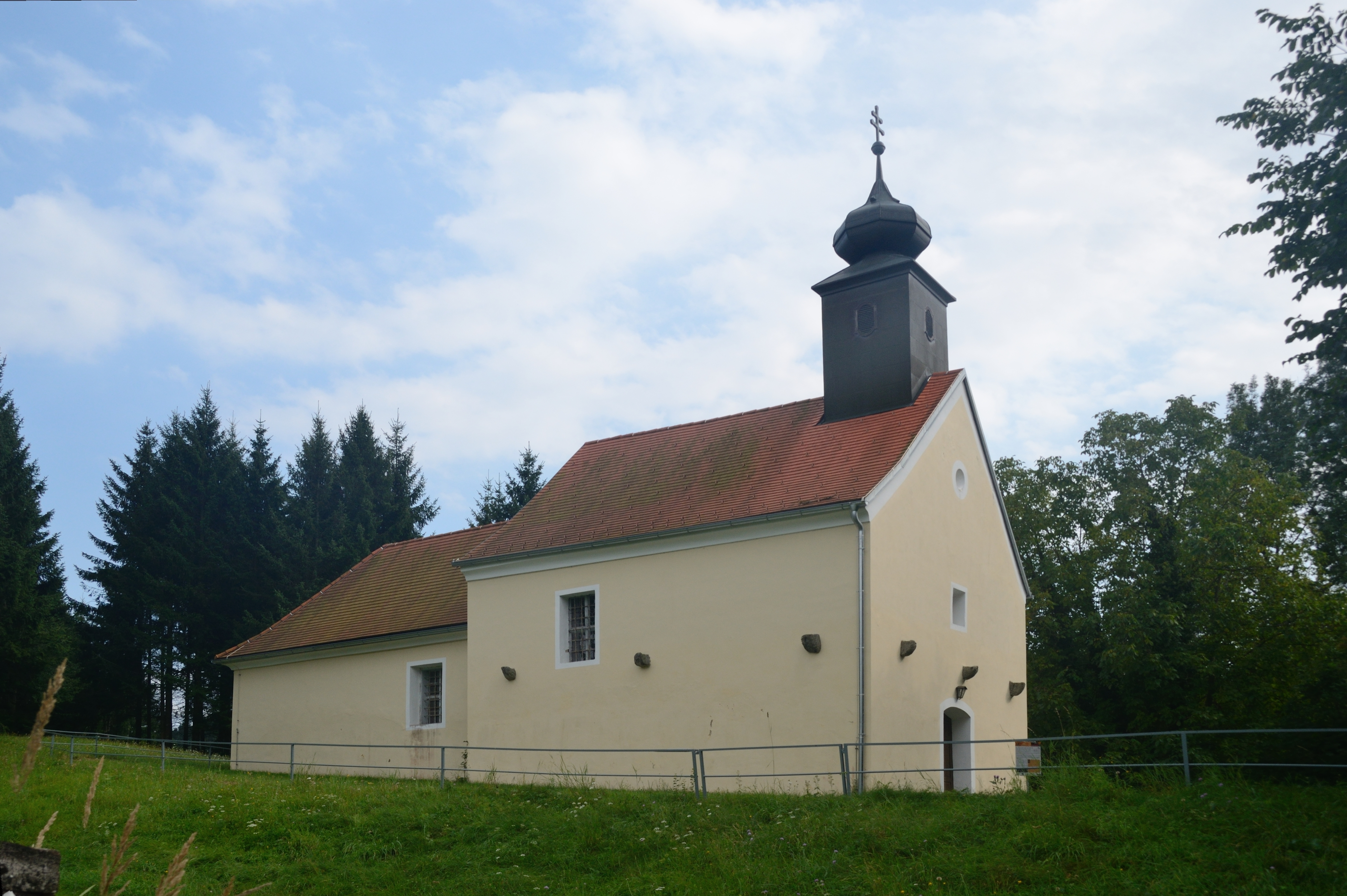
- Saint Nicholas church in Reinberg (part of Riegersberg)

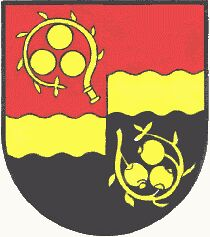
- Coat of arms

- Location within Austria
- Coordinates: 47°25′11″N 15°52′58″E
- Country: Austria
- State: Styria
- District: Hartberg-Fürstenfeld

Area
  - Total: 24.66 km^{2} (9.52 sq mi)
- Elevation: 693 m (2,274 ft)

Population (1 January 2016)
  - Total: 995
  - Density: 40.3/km^{2} (105/sq mi)
- Time zone: UTC+1 (CET)
  - Summer (DST): UTC+2 (CEST)
- Postal code: 8250, 8234, 8251, 8252, 8253
- Area code: 0 33 37
- Vehicle registration: HB
- Website: www.riegersberg.at

Riegersberg is a former municipality in the district of Hartberg-Fürstenfeld in Styria, Austria. Since the 2015 Styria municipal structural reform, it is part of the municipality Vorau.
