= Frutten-Gießelsdorf =

- Former municipality
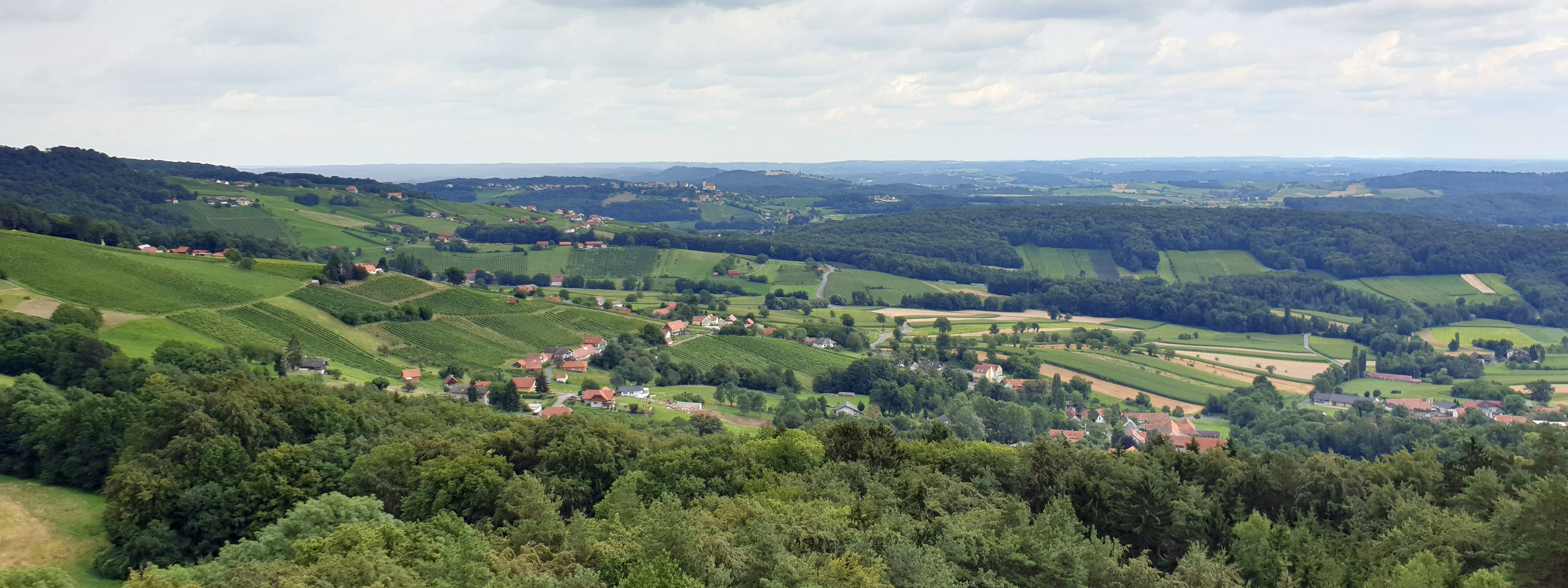
- Panoramic view of Frutten-Gießendorf

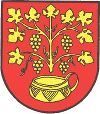
- Coat of arms

- Location within Austria
- Coordinates: 46°49′00″N 15°56′00″E
- Country: Austria
- State: Styria
- District: Südoststeiermark

Area
  - Total: 10.88 km^{2} (4.20 sq mi)
- Elevation: 335 m (1,099 ft)

Population (1 January 2016)
  - Total: 645
  - Density: 59.3/km^{2} (154/sq mi)
- Time zone: UTC+1 (CET)
  - Summer (DST): UTC+2 (CEST)
- Postal code: 8354
- Area code: +43 3158
- Vehicle registration: FB
- Website: www.frutten-giesselsdorf. steiermark.at

Frutten-Gießelsdorf is a former municipality in the district of Südoststeiermark in the state of Styria in Austria. It became part of the municipality of Sankt Anna am Aigen during the Styria municipal structural reform in 2015.

== Population ==
Historical population
Year	Pop.	±%
1869	777	—
1880	797	+2.6%
1890	805	+1.0%
1900	813	+1.0%
1910	838	+3.1%
1923	818	−2.4%
1934	812	−0.7%
1939	761	−6.3%
1951	730	−4.1%
1961	735	+0.7%
1971	745	+1.4%
1981	730	−2.0%
1991	715	−2.1%
2001	681	−4.8%
2012	645	−5.3%
