= Großhart =

- Former municipality
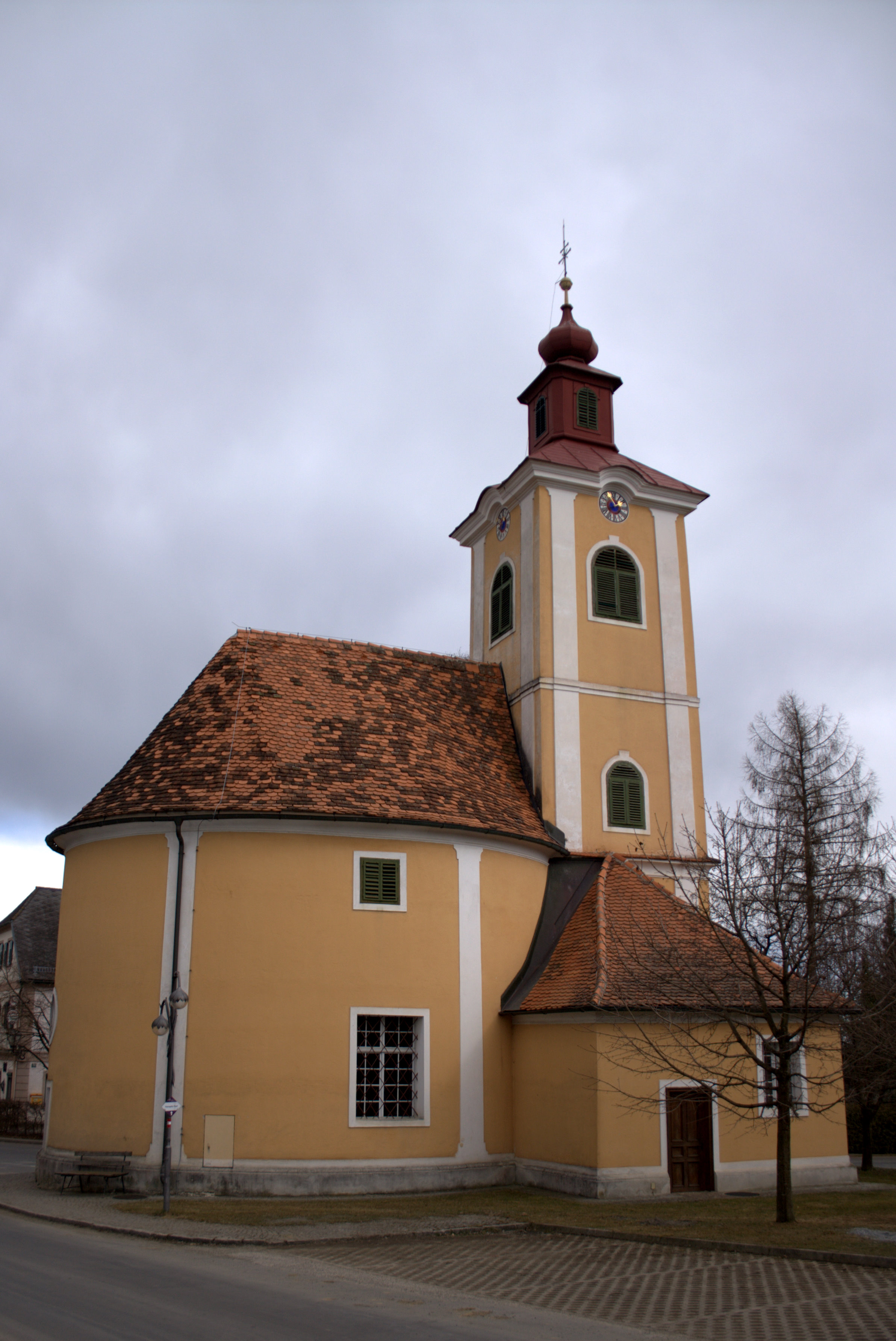
- Catholic church in Auffen (part of Großhart)

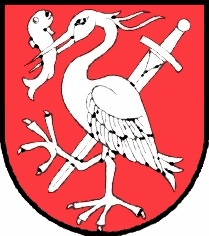
- Coat of arms

- Location within Austria
- Coordinates: 47°10′11″N 15°56′56″E
- Country: Austria
- State: Styria
- District: Hartberg-Fürstenfeld

Area
  - Total: 10.64 km^{2} (4.11 sq mi)
- Elevation: 420 m (1,380 ft)

Population (1 January 2016)
  - Total: 635
  - Density: 59.7/km^{2} (155/sq mi)
- Time zone: UTC+1 (CET)
  - Summer (DST): UTC+2 (CEST)
- Postal code: 8272, 8265, 8271
- Area code: 03333
- Vehicle registration: HB
- Website: www.großhart.steiermark.at

Großhart is a former municipality in the district of Hartberg-Fürstenfeld in Styria, Austria. Since the 2015 Styria municipal structural reform, it is part of the municipality Hartl.
