= Gossendorf =

- Former municipality
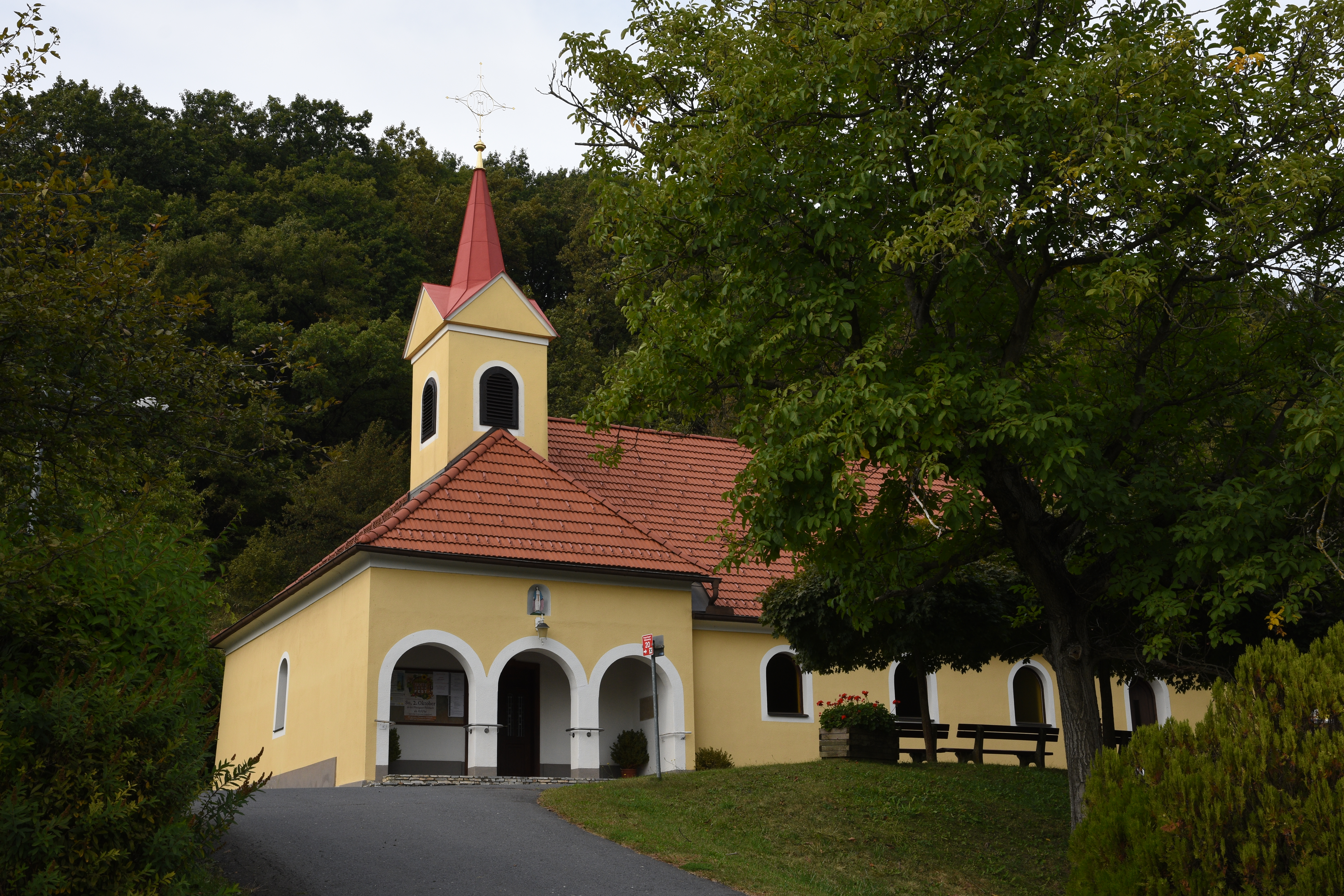
- Chapel in Gossendorf

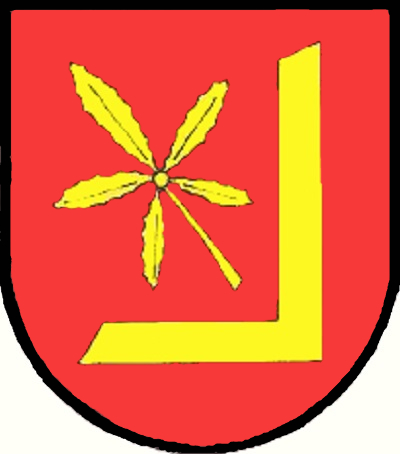
- Coat of arms

- Location within Austria
- Coordinates: 46°55′00″N 15°56′00″E
- Country: Austria
- State: Styria
- District: Südoststeiermark

Area
  - Total: 9.35 km^{2} (3.61 sq mi)
- Elevation: 310 m (1,020 ft)

Population (1 January 2016)
  - Total: 907
  - Density: 97.0/km^{2} (251/sq mi)
- Time zone: UTC+1 (CET)
  - Summer (DST): UTC+2 (CEST)
- Postal code: 8330, 8344
- Area code: +43 3159, +43 3152
- Vehicle registration: FB
- Website: www.gossendorf.at

Gossendorf is a former municipality in the district of Südoststeiermark in the Austrian state of Styria. Since the 2015 Styria municipal structural reform, it is part of the municipality Feldbach.

== Population ==
Historical population
Year	Pop.	±%
1869	749	—
1880	768	+2.5%
1890	791	+3.0%
1900	765	−3.3%
1910	818	+6.9%
1923	815	−0.4%
1934	782	−4.0%
1939	759	−2.9%
1951	750	−1.2%
1961	736	−1.9%
1971	785	+6.7%
1981	804	+2.4%
1991	1,004	+24.9%
2001	950	−5.4%
2013	893	−6.0%
