= Maierdorf =

- Former municipality
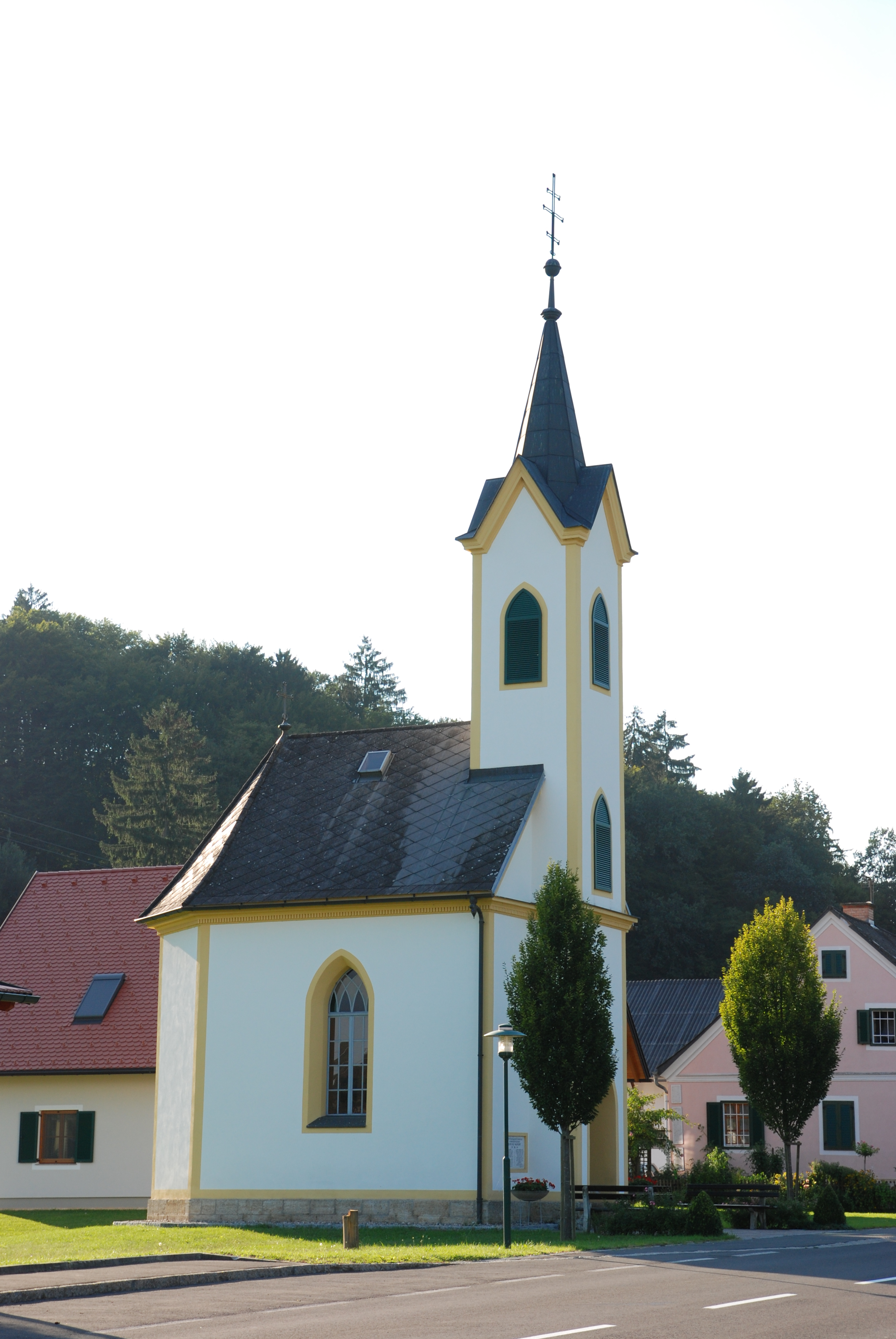
- Chapel in Maierdorf

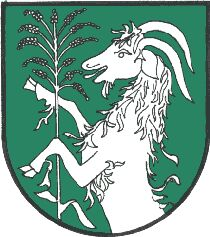
- Coat of arms

- Location within Austria
- Coordinates: 46°54′00″N 15°51′00″E
- Country: Austria
- State: Styria
- District: Südoststeiermark

Area
  - Total: 9.3 km^{2} (3.6 sq mi)
- Elevation: 294 m (965 ft)

Population (1 January 2016)
  - Total: 532
  - Density: 57/km^{2} (150/sq mi)
- Time zone: UTC+1 (CET)
  - Summer (DST): UTC+2 (CEST)
- Postal code: 8342
- Area code: +43 3151
- Vehicle registration: FB
- Website: www.maierdorf. steiermark.at

Maierdorf is a former municipality in the district of Südoststeiermark in the Austrian state of Styria. Since the 2015 Styria municipal structural reform, it is part of the municipality Gnas.

== Population ==
Historical population
Year	Pop.	±%
1869	612	—
1880	697	+13.9%
1890	726	+4.2%
1900	703	−3.2%
1910	665	−5.4%
1923	655	−1.5%
1934	709	+8.2%
1939	664	−6.3%
1951	672	+1.2%
1961	618	−8.0%
1971	624	+1.0%
1981	613	−1.8%
1991	595	−2.9%
2001	562	−5.5%
2013	535	−4.8%
