= Grabersdorf =

- Former municipality
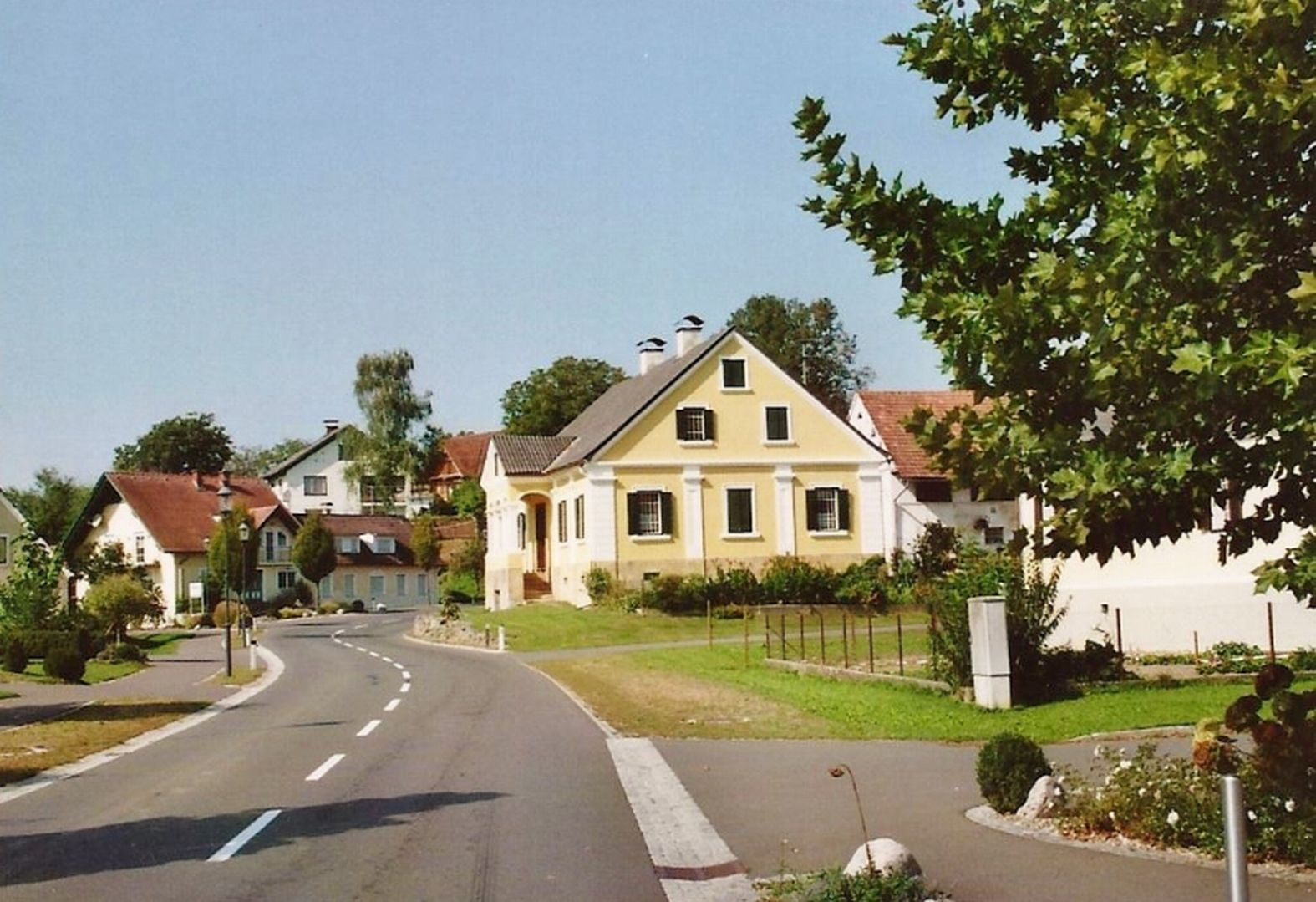

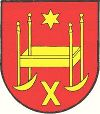
- Coat of arms

- Location within Austria
- Coordinates: 46°51′00″N 15°49′00″E
- Country: Austria
- State: Styria
- District: Südoststeiermark

Area
  - Total: 6.37 km^{2} (2.46 sq mi)
- Elevation: 267 m (876 ft)

Population (1 January 2016)
  - Total: 351
  - Density: 55.1/km^{2} (143/sq mi)
- Time zone: UTC+1 (CET)
  - Summer (DST): UTC+2 (CEST)
- Postal code: 8342
- Area code: +43 3151
- Vehicle registration: FB
- Website: www.grabersdorf. steiermark.at

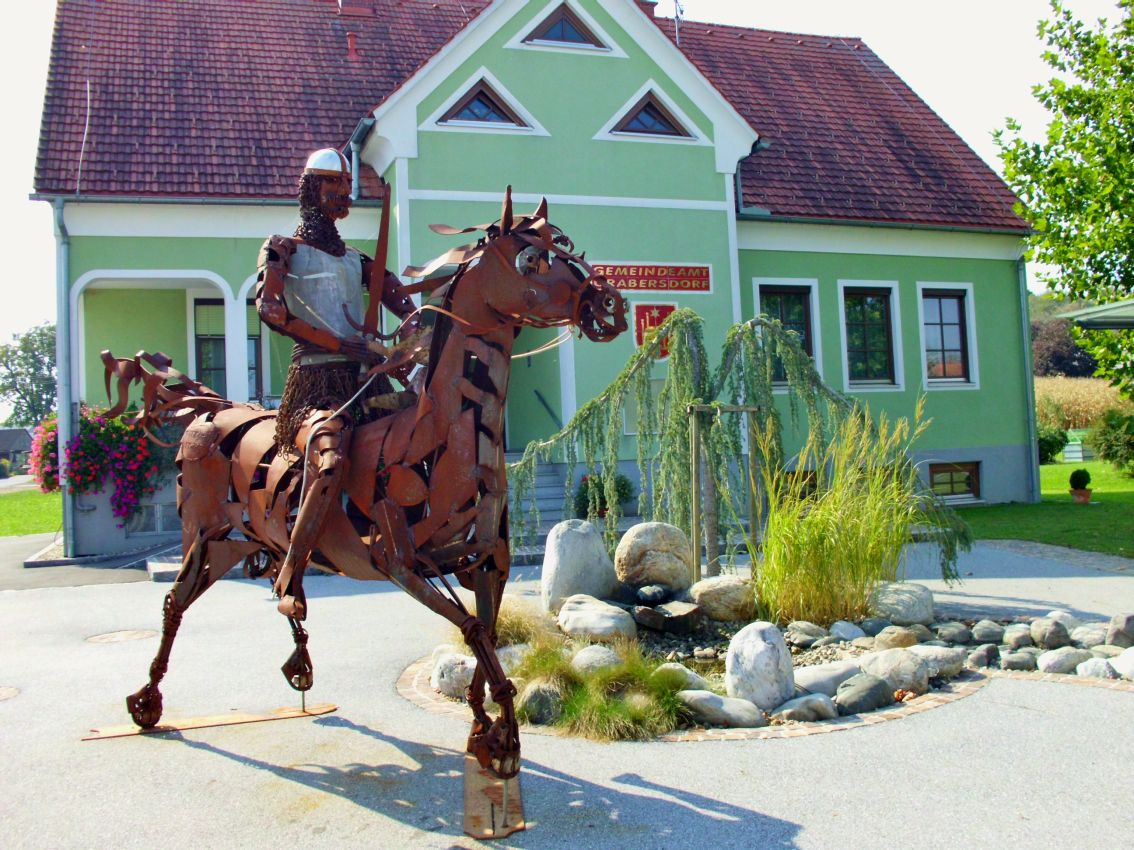
Iron Knight of Grabersdorf before the Municipal House

Grabersdorf is a former municipality in the district of Südoststeiermark in the Austrian state of Styria. Since the 2015 Styria municipal structural reform, it is part of the municipality Gnas.

== Population ==
Historical population
Year	Pop.	±%
1869	470	—
1880	445	−5.3%
1890	435	−2.2%
1900	409	−6.0%
1910	386	−5.6%
1923	382	−1.0%
1934	387	+1.3%
1939	372	−3.9%
1951	350	−5.9%
1961	342	−2.3%
1971	375	+9.6%
1981	404	+7.7%
1991	360	−10.9%
2001	373	+3.6%
2013	342	−8.3%
