= Auersbach =

- Former municipality
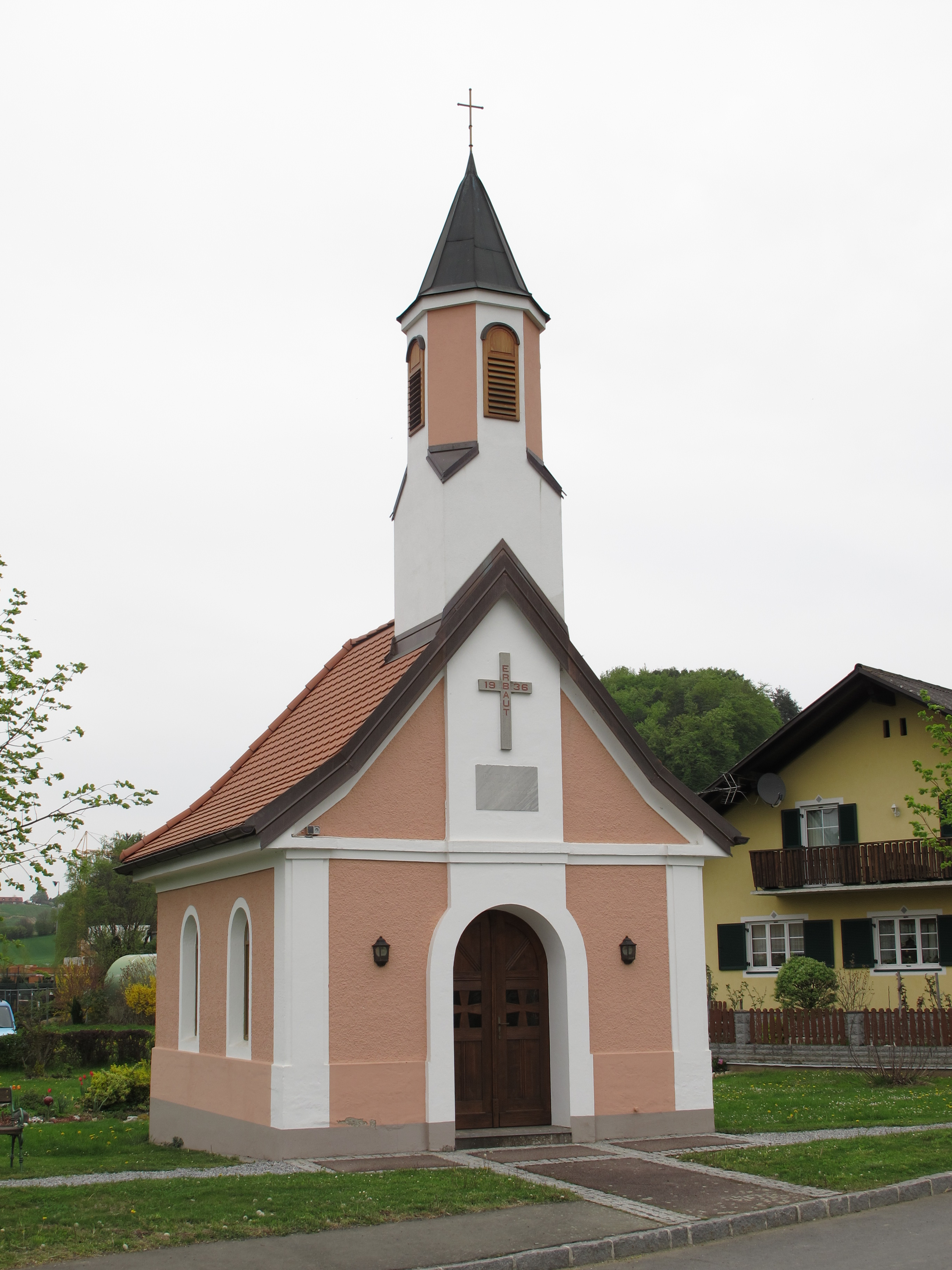
- Chapel in Wetzelsdorf (Auersbach)

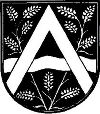
- Coat of arms

- Location within Austria
- Coordinates: 47°01′00″N 15°52′00″E
- Country: Austria
- State: Styria
- District: Südoststeiermark

Area
  - Total: 12.59 km^{2} (4.86 sq mi)
- Elevation: 301 m (988 ft)

Population (1 January 2016)
  - Total: 880
  - Density: 70/km^{2} (180/sq mi)
- Time zone: UTC+1 (CET)
  - Summer (DST): UTC+2 (CEST)
- Postal code: 8330, 8332
- Area code: +43 3152
- Vehicle registration: FB
- Website: www.auersbach.gv.at

Auersbach is a former municipality in the district of Südoststeiermark in the Austrian state of Styria. Since the 2015 Styria municipal structural reform, it is part of the municipality Feldbach.

== Population ==
Historical population
Year	Pop.	±%
1869	760	—
1880	807	+6.2%
1890	881	+9.2%
1900	828	−6.0%
1910	899	+8.6%
1923	841	−6.5%
1934	861	+2.4%
1939	801	−7.0%
1951	825	+3.0%
1961	816	−1.1%
1971	825	+1.1%
1981	835	+1.2%
1991	834	−0.1%
2001	871	+4.4%
2012	867	−0.5%
