= Stainz bei Straden =

- Former municipality
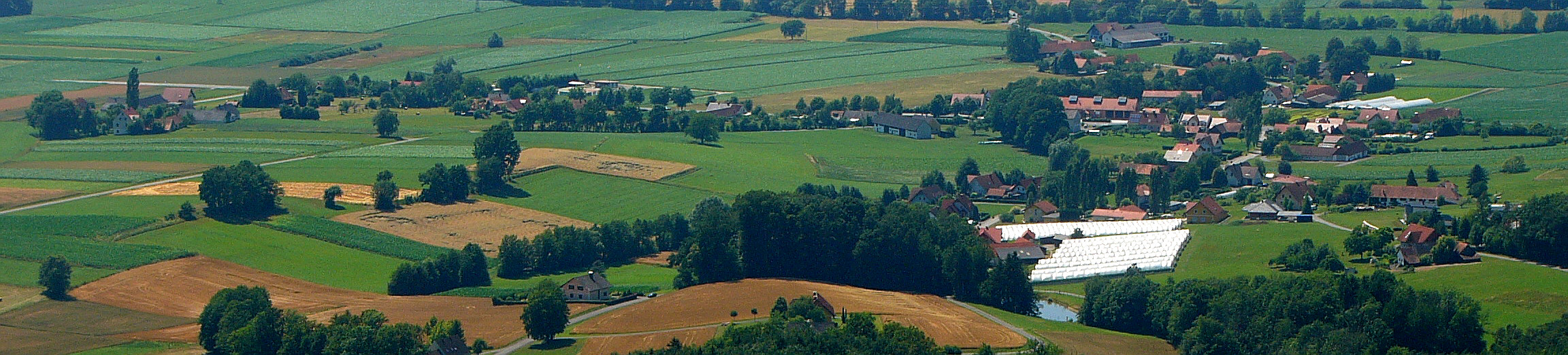
- View of Stainz bei Straden

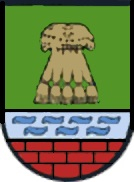
- Coat of arms

- Location within Austria
- Coordinates: 46°49′00″N 15°54′00″E
- Country: Austria
- State: Styria
- District: Südoststeiermark

Area
  - Total: 13.68 km^{2} (5.28 sq mi)
- Elevation: 251 m (823 ft)

Population (1 January 2016)
  - Total: 995
  - Density: 72.7/km^{2} (188/sq mi)
- Time zone: UTC+1 (CET)
  - Summer (DST): UTC+2 (CEST)
- Postal code: 8345, 8355
- Area code: +43 3473
- Vehicle registration: FB
- Website: www.stainz-straden.gv.at

Stainz bei Straden is a former municipality in the district of Südoststeiermark in the Austrian state of Styria. Since the 2015 Styria municipal structural reform, it is part of the municipality Straden.

== Population ==
Historical population
| Year | Pop. | ±% |
|---|---|---|
| 1869 | 1,279 | — |
| 1880 | 1,345 | +5.2% |
| 1890 | 1,437 | +6.8% |
| 1900 | 1,339 | −6.8% |
| 1910 | 1,341 | +0.1% |
| 1923 | 1,309 | −2.4% |
| 1934 | 1,237 | −5.5% |
| 1939 | 1,116 | −9.8% |
| 1951 | 1,040 | −6.8% |
| 1961 | 1,046 | +0.6% |
| 1971 | 1,105 | +5.6% |
| 1981 | 1,099 | −0.5% |
| 1991 | 1,024 | −6.8% |
| 2001 | 1,013 | −1.1% |
| 2012 | 995 | −1.8% |
