= Baumgarten bei Gnas =

- Former municipality
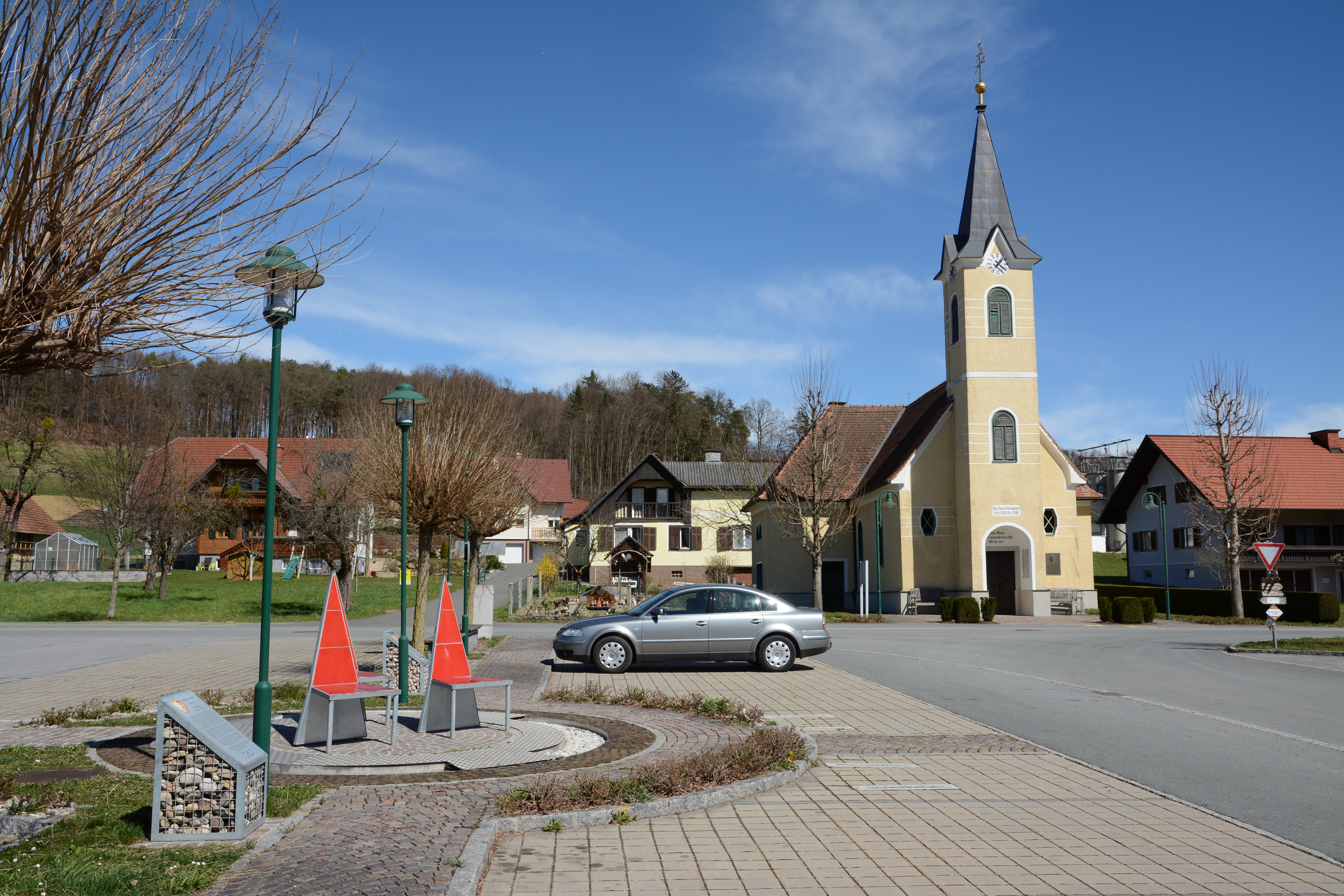
- Centre of Baumgarten bei Gnas

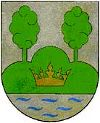
- Coat of arms

- Location within Austria
- Coordinates: 46°54′00″N 15°46′00″E
- Country: Austria
- State: Styria
- District: Südoststeiermark

Area
  - Total: 8.97 km^{2} (3.46 sq mi)
- Elevation: 330 m (1,080 ft)

Population (1 January 2016)
  - Total: 575
  - Density: 64.1/km^{2} (166/sq mi)
- Time zone: UTC+1 (CET)
  - Summer (DST): UTC+2 (CEST)
- Postal code: 8341, 8342
- Area code: +43 3151
- Vehicle registration: FB
- Website: www.baumgarten-gnas. steiermark.at

Baumgarten bei Gnas is part of the municipality Gnas in the Austrian state of Styria. Prior to the 2015 Styria municipal structural reform, it was a municipality in the district of Südoststeiermark.

== Population ==
Historical population
Year	Pop.	±%
1869	689	—
1880	761	+10.4%
1890	791	+3.9%
1900	752	−4.9%
1910	769	+2.3%
1923	727	−5.5%
1934	771	+6.1%
1939	741	−3.9%
1951	694	−6.3%
1961	635	−8.5%
1971	693	+9.1%
1981	680	−1.9%
1991	668	−1.8%
2001	641	−4.0%
2013	575	−10.3%
