= Glojach =

- Former municipality
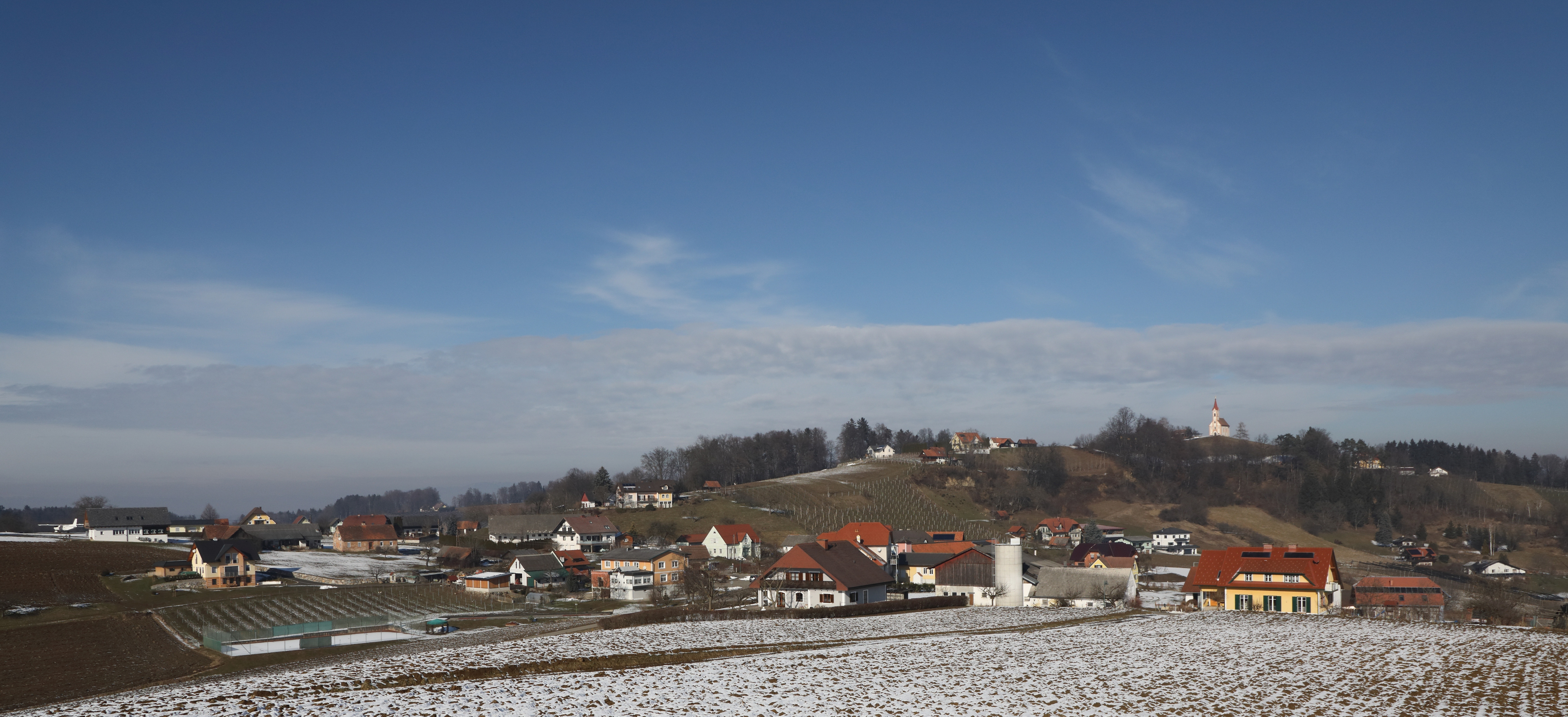
- Glojach

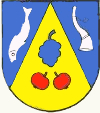
- Coat of arms

- Location within Austria
- Coordinates: 46°52′00″N 15°41′00″E
- Country: Austria
- State: Styria
- District: Südoststeiermark

Area
  - Total: 3.38 km^{2} (1.31 sq mi)
- Elevation: 410 m (1,350 ft)

Population (1 January 2016)
  - Total: 245
  - Density: 72.5/km^{2} (188/sq mi)
- Time zone: UTC+1 (CET)
  - Summer (DST): UTC+2 (CEST)
- Postal code: 8421
- Area code: +43 3184
- Vehicle registration: FB
- Website: www.glojach. steiermark.at

Glojach is a former municipality in the district of Südoststeiermark in the Austrian state of Styria. Since the 2015 Styria municipal structural reform, it is part of the municipality Sankt Stefan im Rosental.

== Population ==
Historical population
Year	Pop.	±%
1869	317	—
1880	271	−14.5%
1890	284	+4.8%
1900	291	+2.5%
1910	323	+11.0%
1923	286	−11.5%
1934	282	−1.4%
1939	284	+0.7%
1951	242	−14.8%
1961	236	−2.5%
1971	241	+2.1%
1981	233	−3.3%
1991	237	+1.7%
2001	238	+0.4%
2013	244	+2.5%
