= Dienersdorf =

- Former municipality
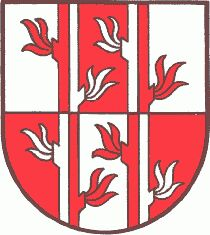
- Coat of arms

- Location within Austria
- Coordinates: 47°14′30″N 15°54′01″E
- Country: Austria
- State: Styria
- District: Hartberg-Fürstenfeld

Area
  - Total: 7.06 km^{2} (2.73 sq mi)
- Elevation: 355 m (1,165 ft)

Population (1 January 2016)
  - Total: 690
  - Density: 98/km^{2} (250/sq mi)
- Time zone: UTC+1 (CET)
  - Summer (DST): UTC+2 (CEST)
- Postal code: 8224
- Area code: 03334
- Vehicle registration: HB
- Website: www.dienersdorf.at

Dienersdorf is a former municipality in the district of Hartberg-Fürstenfeld in Styria, Austria. Since the 2015 Styria municipal structural reform, it is part of the municipality Kaindorf.
