= Schachen bei Vorau =

- Former municipality
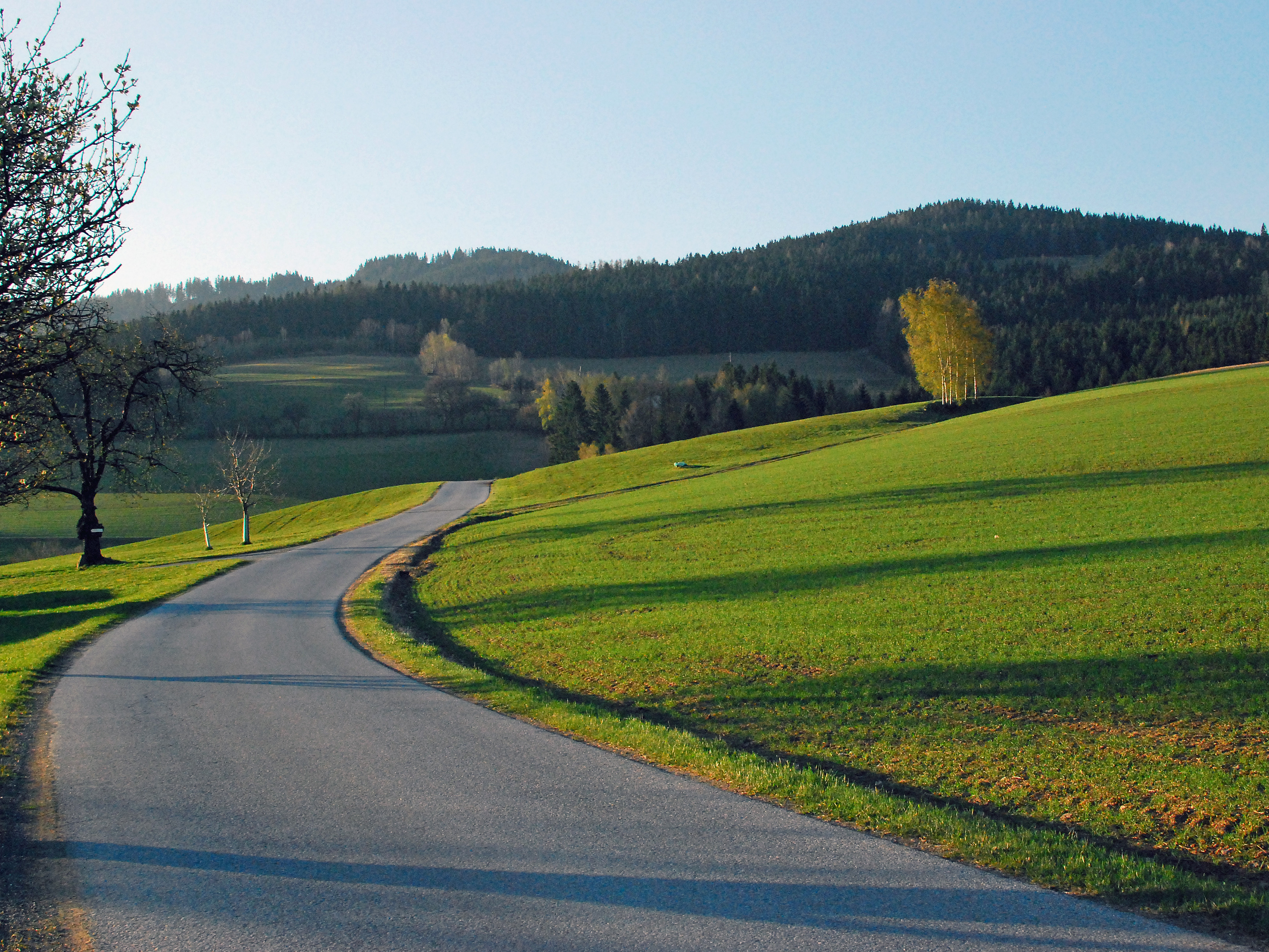
- View of the Masenberg in Schachen bei Vorau

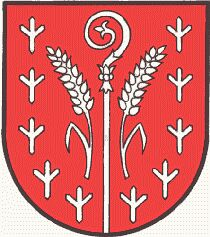
- Coat of arms

- Location within Austria
- Coordinates: 47°22′59″N 15°51′24″E
- Country: Austria
- State: Styria
- District: Hartberg-Fürstenfeld

Area
  - Total: 19.05 km^{2} (7.36 sq mi)
- Elevation: 740 m (2,430 ft)

Population (1 January 2016)
  - Total: 1,174
  - Density: 61.63/km^{2} (159.6/sq mi)
- Time zone: UTC+1 (CET)
  - Summer (DST): UTC+2 (CEST)
- Postal code: 8250
- Area code: 0 33 37
- Vehicle registration: HB
- Website: www.schachen-vorau.at

Schachen bei Vorau is a former municipality in the district of Hartberg-Fürstenfeld in Styria, Austria. Since the 2015 Styria municipal structural reform, it is part of the municipality Vorau.
