= Saifen-Boden =

- Former municipality
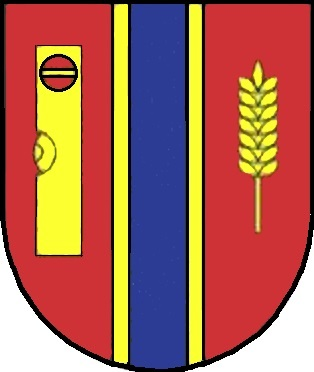
- Coat of arms

- Location within Austria
- Coordinates: 47°19′27″N 15°47′48″E
- Country: Austria
- State: Styria
- District: Hartberg-Fürstenfeld

Area
  - Total: 18.81 km^{2} (7.26 sq mi)
- Elevation: 560 m (1,840 ft)

Population (1 January 2016)
  - Total: 1,034
  - Density: 54.97/km^{2} (142.4/sq mi)
- Time zone: UTC+1 (CET)
  - Summer (DST): UTC+2 (CEST)
- Postal code: 8225
- Area code: 03335
- Vehicle registration: HB
- Website: www.saifen-boden.at

Saifen-Boden is a former municipality in the district of Hartberg-Fürstenfeld in Styria, Austria. Since the 2015 Styria municipal structural reform, it is part of the municipality Pöllau.
