= Perlsdorf =

- Former municipality
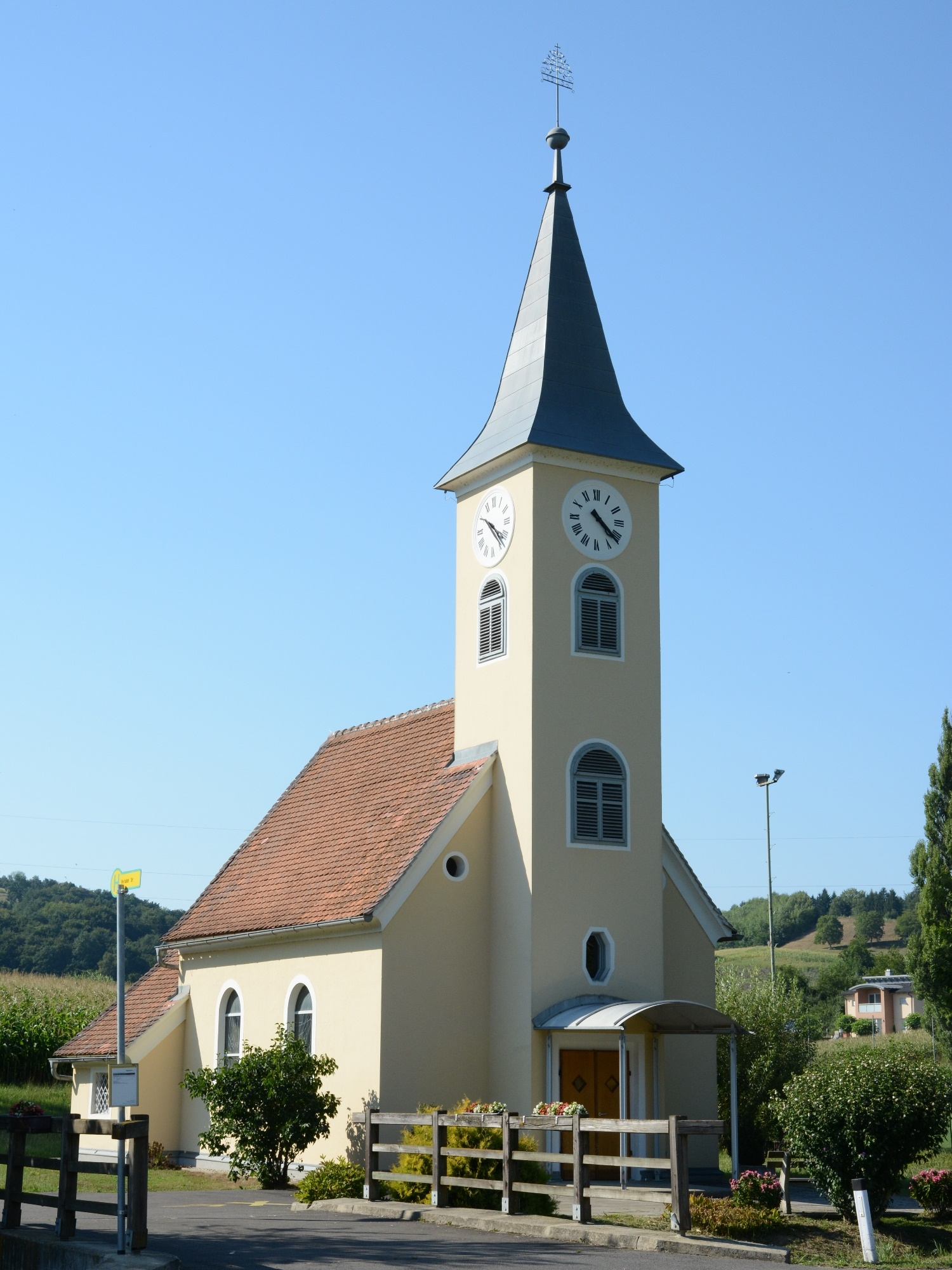
- Chapel in Perlsdorf

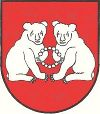
- Coat of arms

- Location within Austria
- Coordinates: 46°54′00″N 15°49′00″E
- Country: Austria
- State: Styria
- District: Südoststeiermark

Area
  - Total: 5.62 km^{2} (2.17 sq mi)
- Elevation: 299 m (981 ft)

Population (1 January 2016)
  - Total: 351
  - Density: 62.5/km^{2} (162/sq mi)
- Time zone: UTC+1 (CET)
  - Summer (DST): UTC+2 (CEST)
- Postal code: 8342
- Area code: +43 3151
- Vehicle registration: FB
- Website: www.perlsdorf. steiermark.at

Perlsdorf is a former municipality in the district of Südoststeiermark in the Austrian state of Styria. Since the 2015 Styria municipal structural reform, it is part of the Paldau municipality.

== Population ==
Historical population
Year	Pop.	±%
1869	514	—
1880	513	−0.2%
1890	494	−3.7%
1900	489	−1.0%
1910	515	+5.3%
1923	494	−4.1%
1934	487	−1.4%
1939	439	−9.9%
1951	427	−2.7%
1961	413	−3.3%
1971	423	+2.4%
1981	442	+4.5%
1991	402	−9.0%
2001	369	−8.2%
2013	345	−6.5%
