= Frannach =

- Former municipality
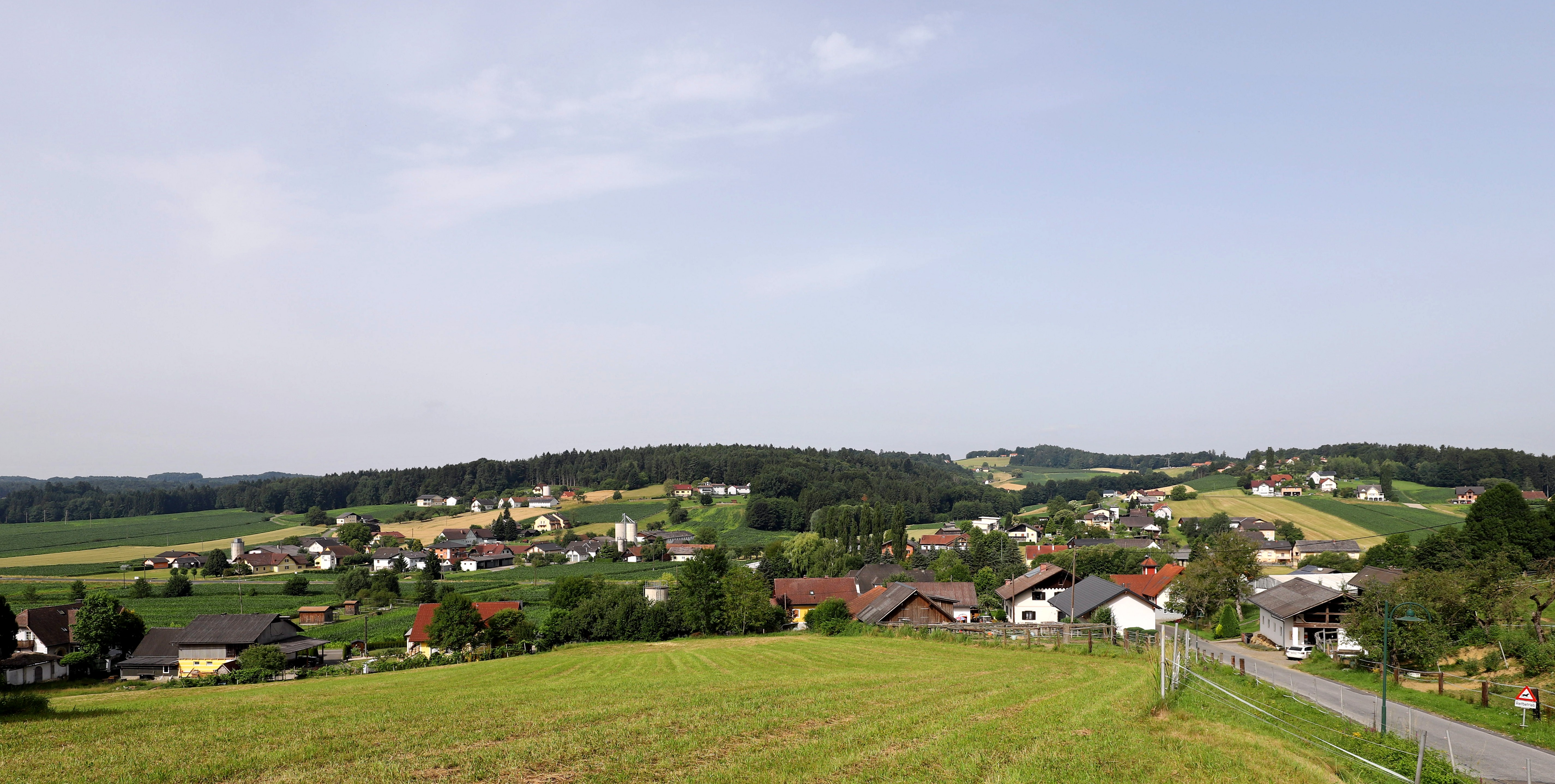
- Chapel in Frannach

- Location within Austria
- Coordinates: 46°55′00″N 15°38′00″E
- Country: Austria
- State: Styria
- District: Südoststeiermark

Area
  - Total: 8.04 km^{2} (3.10 sq mi)
- Elevation: 316 m (1,037 ft)

Population (1 January 2016)
  - Total: 558
  - Density: 69.4/km^{2} (180/sq mi)
- Time zone: UTC+1 (CET)
  - Summer (DST): UTC+2 (CEST)
- Postal code: 8081
- Area code: +43 3116
- Vehicle registration: FB
- Website: www.frannach. steiermark.at

Frannach is a former municipality in the district of Südoststeiermark in the Austrian state of Styria. Since the 2015 Styria municipal structural reform, it is part of the municipality Pirching am Traubenberg. It is located approximately 23 km (15 miles) to the southeast of Graz.

== Population ==
Historical population
Year	Pop.	±%
1869	640	—
1880	633	−1.1%
1890	597	−5.7%
1900	574	−3.9%
1910	582	+1.4%
1923	591	+1.5%
1934	623	+5.4%
1939	575	−7.7%
1951	537	−6.6%
1961	499	−7.1%
1971	537	+7.6%
1981	509	−5.2%
1991	516	+1.4%
2001	525	+1.7%
2013	560	+6.7%
