= Puchegg =

- Former municipality
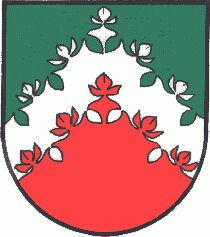
- Coat of arms

- Location within Austria
- Coordinates: 47°23′15″N 15°53′27″E
- Country: Austria
- State: Styria
- District: Hartberg-Fürstenfeld

Area
  - Total: 13.64 km^{2} (5.27 sq mi)
- Elevation: 740 m (2,430 ft)

Population (1 January 2016)
  - Total: 551
  - Density: 40.4/km^{2} (105/sq mi)
- Time zone: UTC+1 (CET)
  - Summer (DST): UTC+2 (CEST)
- Postal code: 8250
- Area code: 03337
- Vehicle registration: HB
- Website: www.puchegg. steiermark.at

Puchegg is a former municipality in the district of Hartberg-Fürstenfeld in Styria, Austria. Since the 2015 Styria municipal structural reform, it is part of the municipality Vorau.
