= Unterauersbach =

- Former municipality
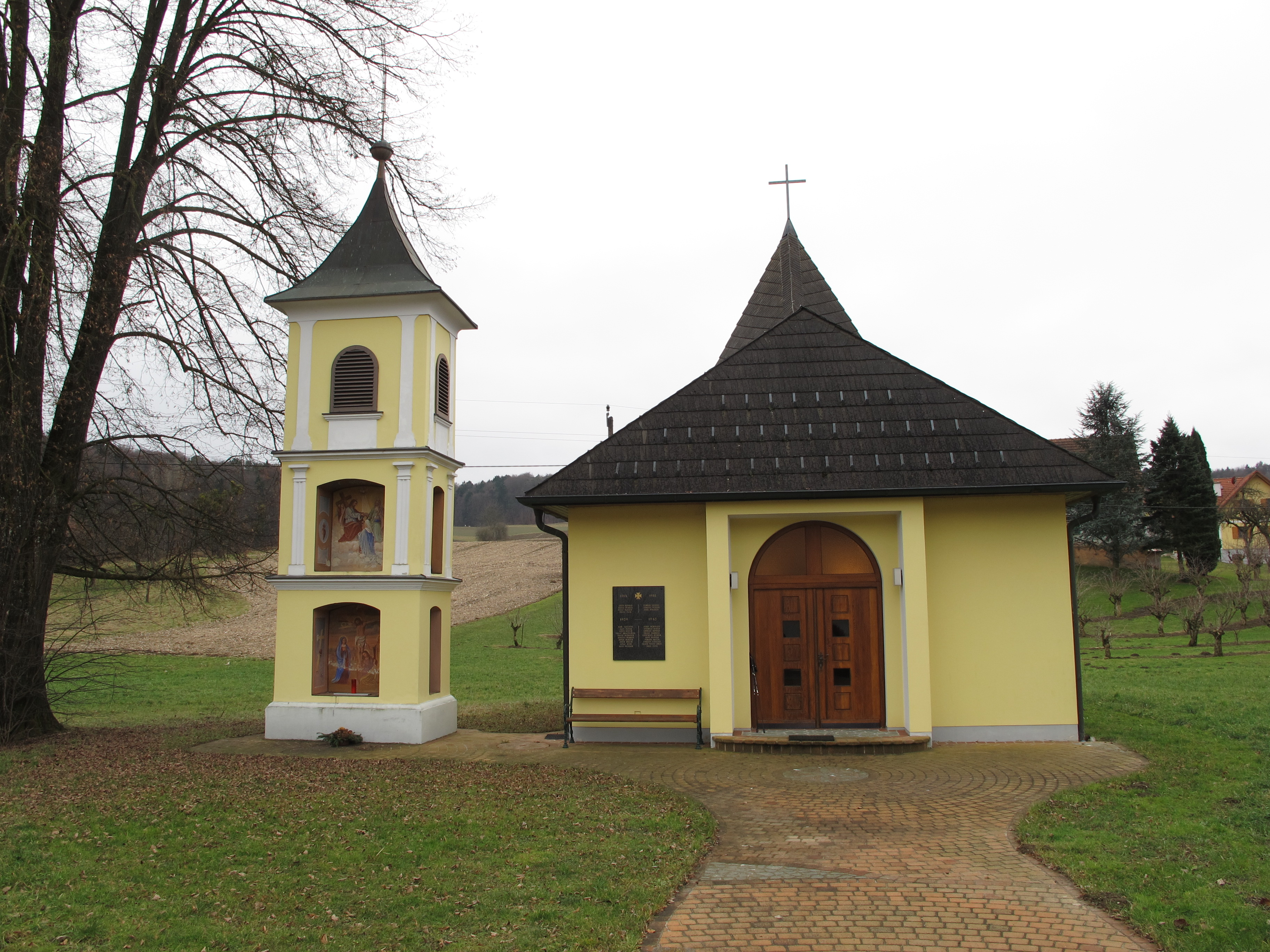
- Chapel in Unterauersbach

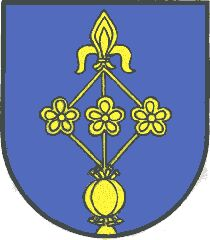
- Coat of arms

- Location within Austria
- Coordinates: 46°51′58″N 15°46′14″E
- Country: Austria
- State: Styria
- District: Südoststeiermark

Area
  - Total: 7.89 km^{2} (3.05 sq mi)
- Elevation: 330 m (1,080 ft)

Population (1 January 2016)
  - Total: 449
  - Density: 56.9/km^{2} (147/sq mi)
- Time zone: UTC+1 (CET)
  - Summer (DST): UTC+2 (CEST)
- Postal code: 8342
- Area code: +43 3151
- Vehicle registration: FB
- Website: www.unterauersbach. steiermark.at

Unterauersbach is a former municipality in the district of Südoststeiermark in the Austrian state of Styria. Since the 2015 Styria municipal structural reform, it is part of the municipality Gnas.

== Population ==
Historical population
Year	Pop.	±%
1869	671	—
1880	650	−3.1%
1890	617	−5.1%
1900	609	−1.3%
1910	697	+14.4%
1923	577	−17.2%
1934	597	+3.5%
1939	563	−5.7%
1951	466	−17.2%
1961	492	+5.6%
1971	509	+3.5%
1981	521	+2.4%
1991	518	−0.6%
2001	499	−3.7%
2013	447	−10.4%
