= Unterlamm =

- Municipality
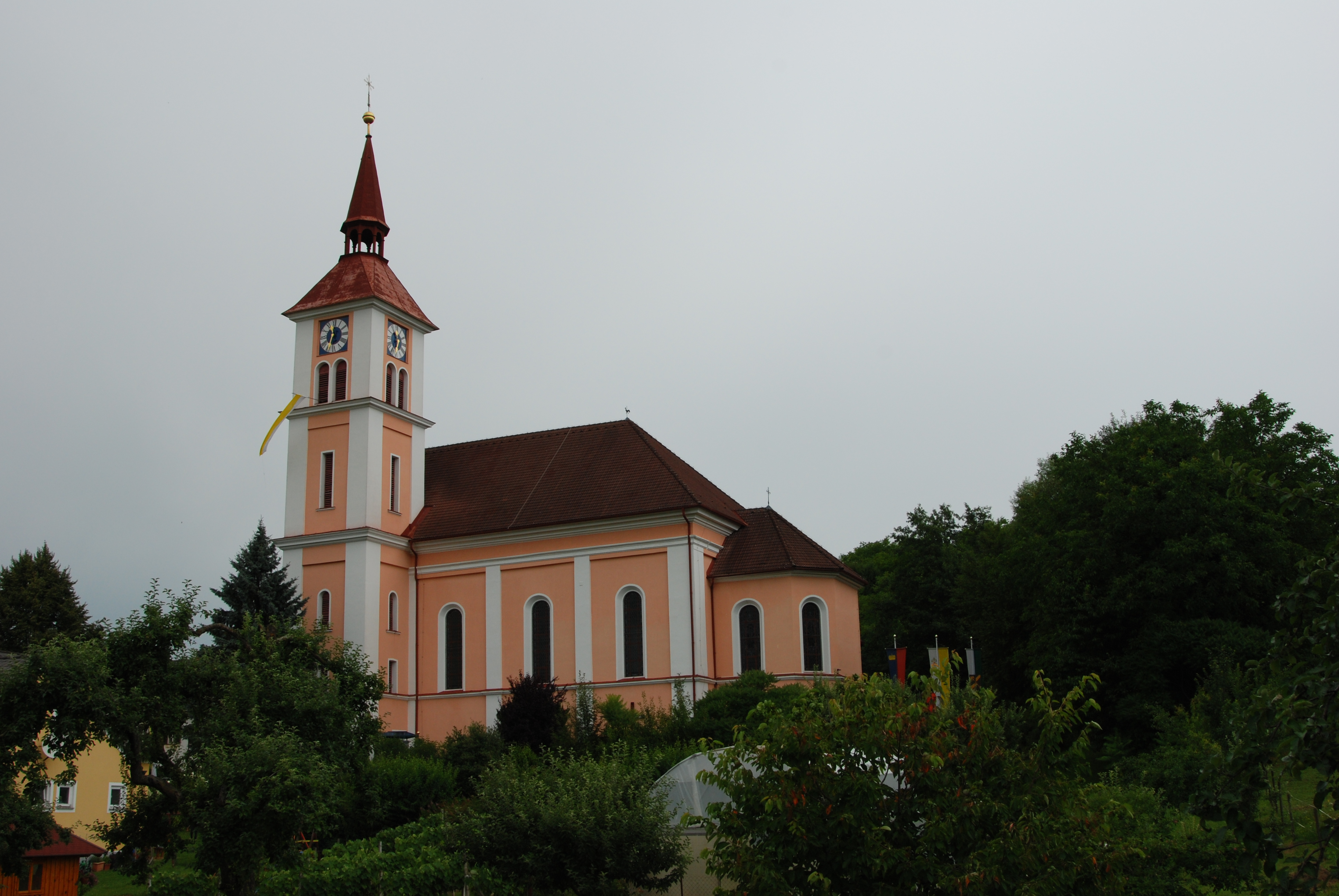

- Coat of arms

- Location within Austria
- Coordinates: 46°59′00″N 16°03′00″E
- Country: Austria
- State: Styria
- District: Südoststeiermark

Government
  - Mayor: Robert Hammer (ÖVP)

Area
  - Total: 16.7 km^{2} (6.4 sq mi)
- Elevation: 285 m (935 ft)

Population (2018-01-01)
  - Total: 1,264
  - Density: 75.7/km^{2} (196/sq mi)
- Time zone: UTC+1 (CET)
  - Summer (DST): UTC+2 (CEST)
- Postal code: 8352
- Area code: +43 3155
- Vehicle registration: FB
- Website: www.unterlamm.gv.at

Unterlamm is a municipality in the district of Südoststeiermark in the Austrian state of Styria.

== Population ==
Historical population
Year	Pop.	±%
1869	1,488	—
1880	1,554	+4.4%
1890	1,584	+1.9%
1900	1,637	+3.3%
1910	1,732	+5.8%
1923	1,601	−7.6%
1934	1,519	−5.1%
1939	1,425	−6.2%
1951	1,333	−6.5%
1961	1,332	−0.1%
1971	1,326	−0.5%
1981	1,288	−2.9%
1991	1,297	+0.7%
2001	1,313	+1.2%
2013	1,235	−5.9%
