= Jagerberg =

- Municipality
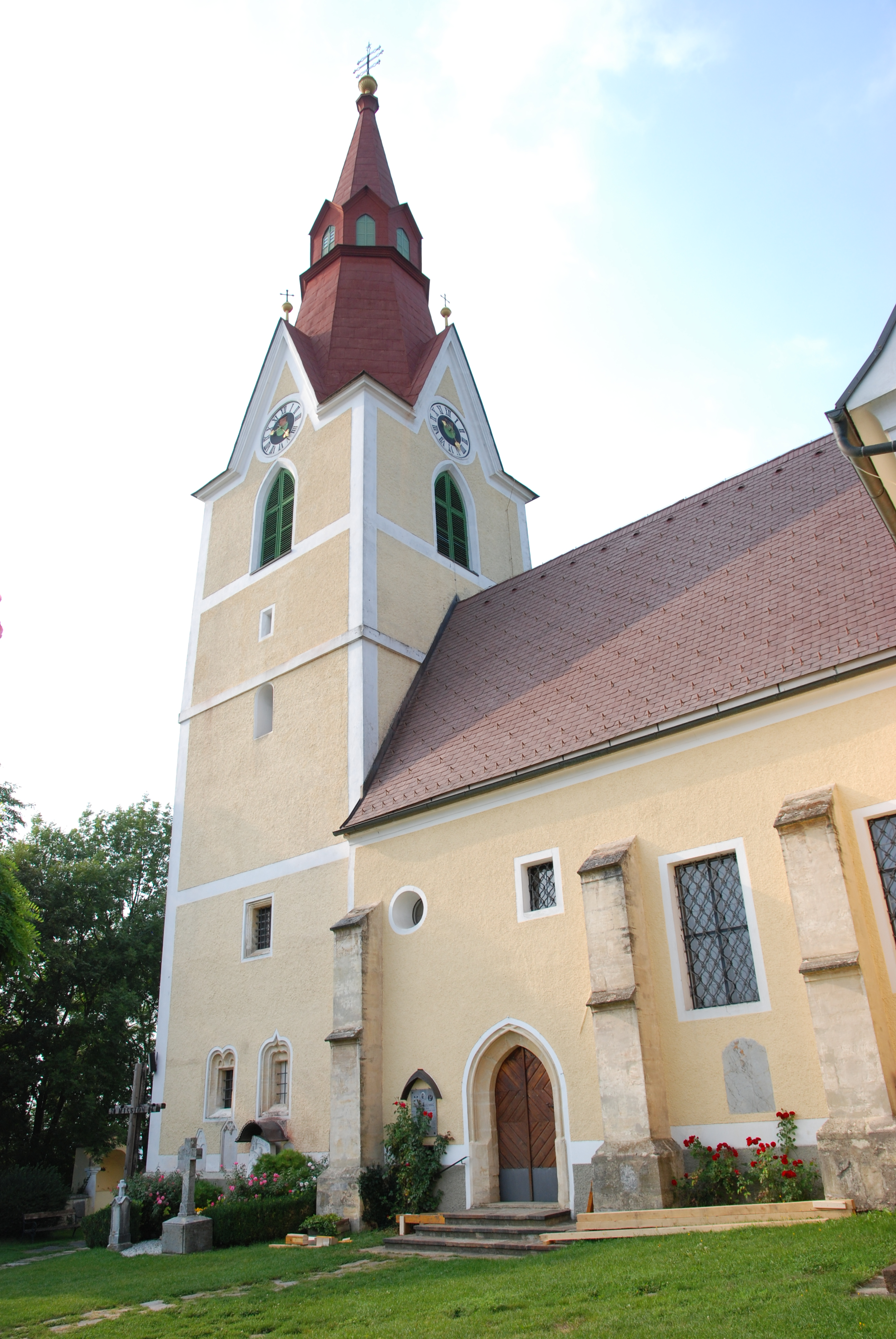
- The Jagerberg parish church

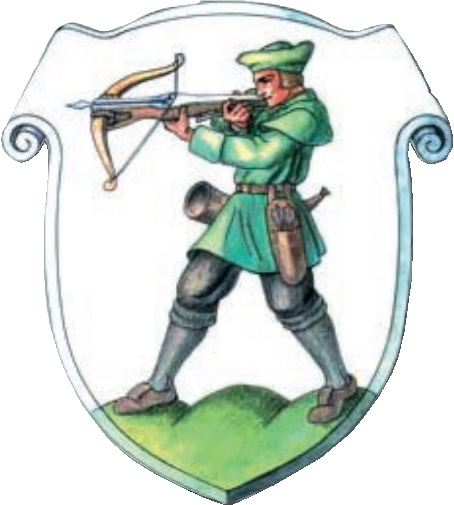
- Coat of arms

- Location within Austria
- Coordinates: 46°51′00″N 15°44′00″E
- Country: Austria
- State: Styria
- District: Südoststeiermark

Government
  - Mayor: Viktor Wurzinger (ÖVP)

Area
  - Total: 29.03 km^{2} (11.21 sq mi)
- Elevation: 380 m (1,250 ft)

Population (1 January 2023)
  - Total: 1,629
  - Density: 56.11/km^{2} (145.3/sq mi)
- Time zone: UTC+1 (CET)
  - Summer (DST): UTC+2 (CEST)
- Postal code: 8091
- Area code: +43 3184
- Vehicle registration: FB
- Website: www.jagerberg.info

Jagerberg is a municipality in the district of Südoststeiermark in the Austrian state of Styria. As of 1 January 2023, it has a combined population of 1,629 and an area of 29.03 km^{2}.

== Population ==
Historical population
Year	Pop.	±%
1869	2,288	—
1880	2,180	−4.7%
1890	2,187	+0.3%
1900	2,142	−2.1%
1910	2,168	+1.2%
1923	2,063	−4.8%
1934	2,007	−2.7%
1939	1,991	−0.8%
1951	1,898	−4.7%
1961	1,819	−4.2%
1971	1,925	+5.8%
1981	1,869	−2.9%
1991	1,892	+1.2%
2001	1,764	−6.8%
2012	1,664	−5.7%
2023	1,629	−2.1%
