= Eichkögl =

- Municipality
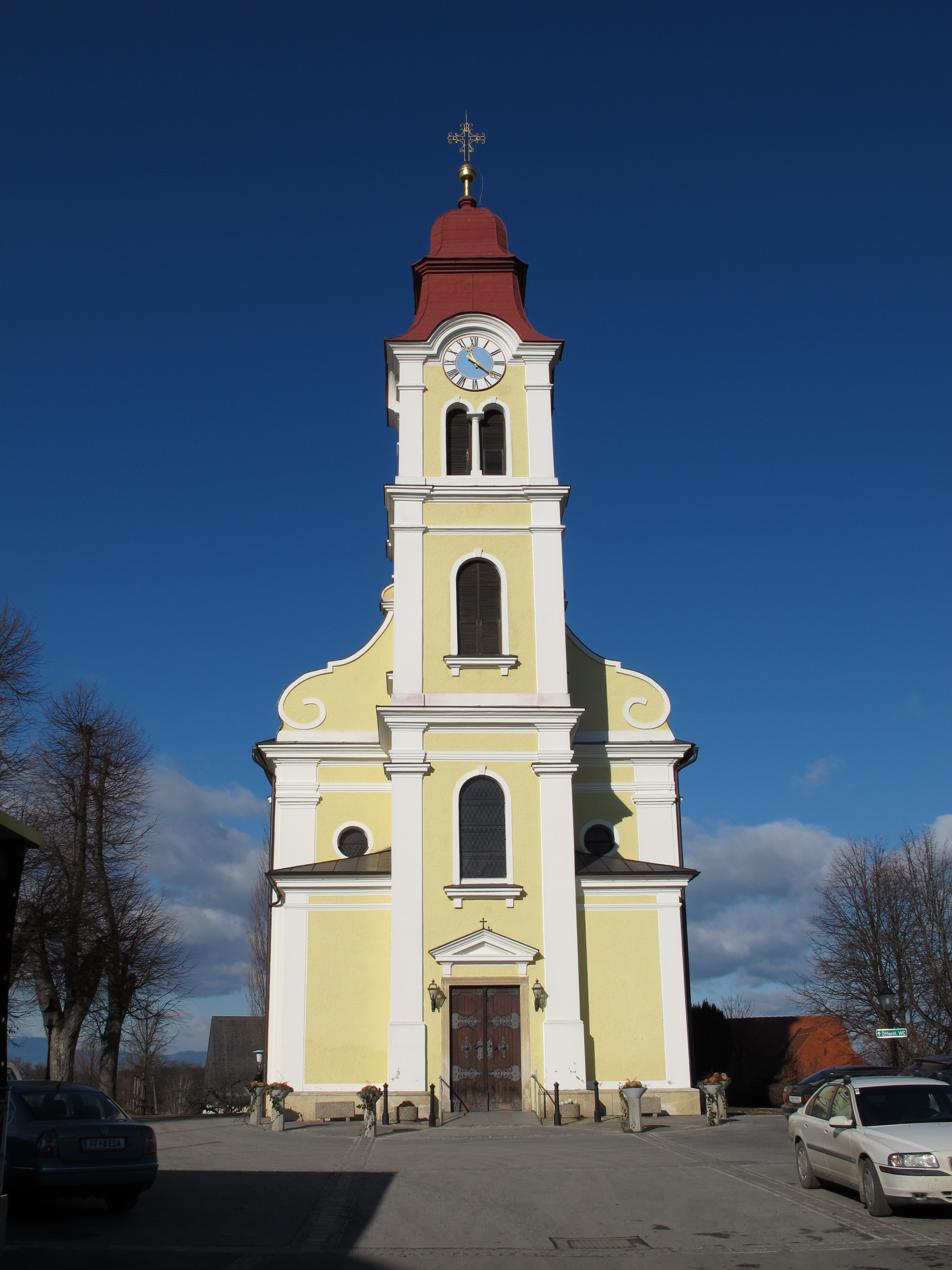
- Eichkögl parish church

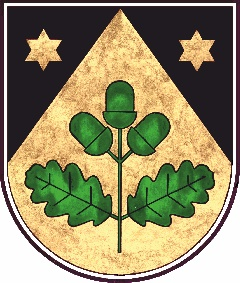
- Coat of arms

- Location within Austria Location within Styria
- Coordinates: 47°01′00″N 15°47′00″E
- Country: Austria
- State: Styria
- District: Südoststeiermark

Government
  - Mayor: Heinz Konrad (ÖVP)

Area
  - Total: 14.93 km^{2} (5.76 sq mi)
- Elevation: 429 m (1,407 ft)

Population (2018-01-01)
  - Total: 1,310
  - Density: 87.7/km^{2} (227/sq mi)
- Time zone: UTC+1 (CET)
  - Summer (DST): UTC+2 (CEST)
- Postal code: 8322
- Area code: +43 3115
- Vehicle registration: FB
- Website: www.eichkoegl.at

Eichkögl is a municipality in the district of Südoststeiermark in Styria, Austria.

== Population ==
Historical population
Year	Pop.	±%
1869	1,202	—
1880	1,256	+4.5%
1890	1,215	−3.3%
1900	1,226	+0.9%
1910	1,257	+2.5%
1923	1,209	−3.8%
1934	1,281	+6.0%
1939	1,281	+0.0%
1951	1,218	−4.9%
1961	1,186	−2.6%
1971	1,216	+2.5%
1981	1,256	+3.3%
1991	1,238	−1.4%
2001	1,226	−1.0%
2013	1,245	+1.5%
