= Leo Reinisch =

Austrian linguistic, Egyptologist and Africanist (1832–1919)

Simon Leo Reinisch
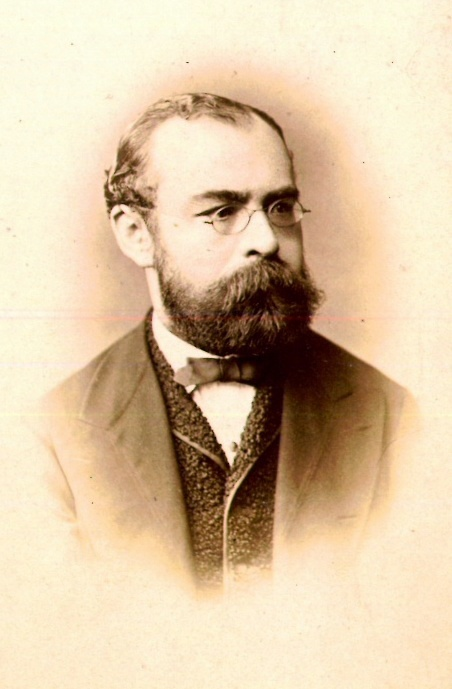
- Reinisch in 1874
- Born: October 26, 1832; Osterwitz, Austria
- Died: December 24, 1919 (aged 87); Maria Lankowitz, Austria
- Occupations: linguist; Egyptologist; Africanist; professor
- Known for: Considered the founder of Egyptology and African Studies in Austria

Simon Leo Reinisch or just Leo Reinisch (26 October 1832 in Osterwitz – 24 December 1919 in Maria Lankowitz) was an Austrian linguist, Egyptologist, Africanist and professor at the University of Vienna.

== Biography ==
In 1854 Reinisch began studying history, philology, Sanskrit, Hebrew, Arabic and Coptic at the University of Vienna. In 1873, the same university granted him a full professorship in Egyptian antiquity (Ägyptische Altertumskunde), the first chair for Egyptology in Austria. He also worked as the personal secretary to the Kaiser in Mexico.

== Legacy ==
16 years after Reinisch's death, the Reinischgasse street in Vienna-Döbling was named after him.

== Publications ==
Reinisch has published collections of texts, grammars and dictionaries on over 20 different languages. These are some of his most important works:

- Die ägyptischen Denkmäler in Miramar, 1865. (co-written with E. Robert Roesler)
- Die zweisprachige Inschrift von Tanis, 1866. (co-written with E. Robert Roesler)
- Der einheitliche Ursprung der Sprachen in der Alten Welt, 1873.
- Ägyptische Chrestomathie, 2 volumes, 1873/75.
- Die Barea-Sprache, 1874.
- Die Sprachen von Nordost-Afrika, 3 volumes, 1874–1879.
- Die Sprache der Irob-Saho in Abessinien, 1878.
- Die Nuba-Sprache, 2 volumes, 1879.
- Die Afar-Sprache, 3 volumes, 1886–1887.
- Die Bilin-Sprache, 2 volumes, 1887.
- Die Kafa-Sprache in Nordost-Afrika, 2 volumes, 1888.
- Das Zahlwort vier und neun in den Chamitisch-Semitischen Sprachen, 1890.
- Die Saho-Sprache, 2 volumes, 1890.
- Die Bedauye-Sprache in Nordost-Afrika, 3 volumes, 1893–1895..
- Die Somali-Sprache, 2 volumes, 1900/02.
- Das persönliche Fürwort und die Verbalflexion in den Chamito-Semitischen Sprachen, 1909.
- Die sprachliche Stellung des Nuba, 1911.

== Gallery ==
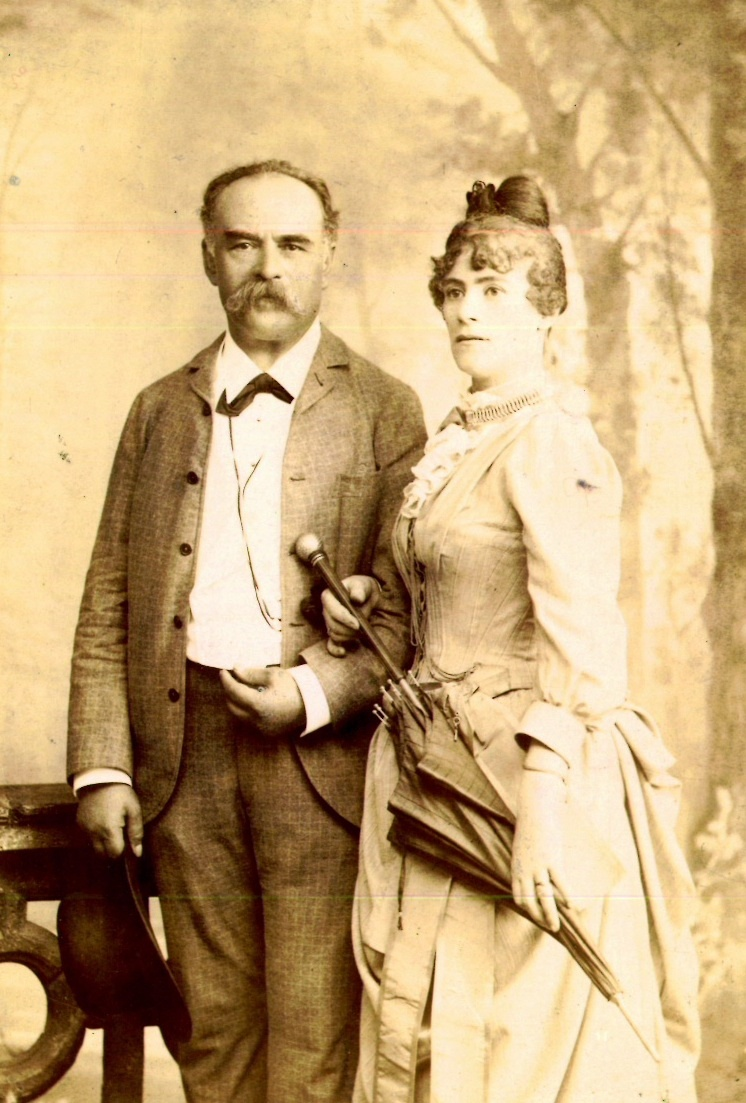
Reinisch with his first wife Luise, 1887

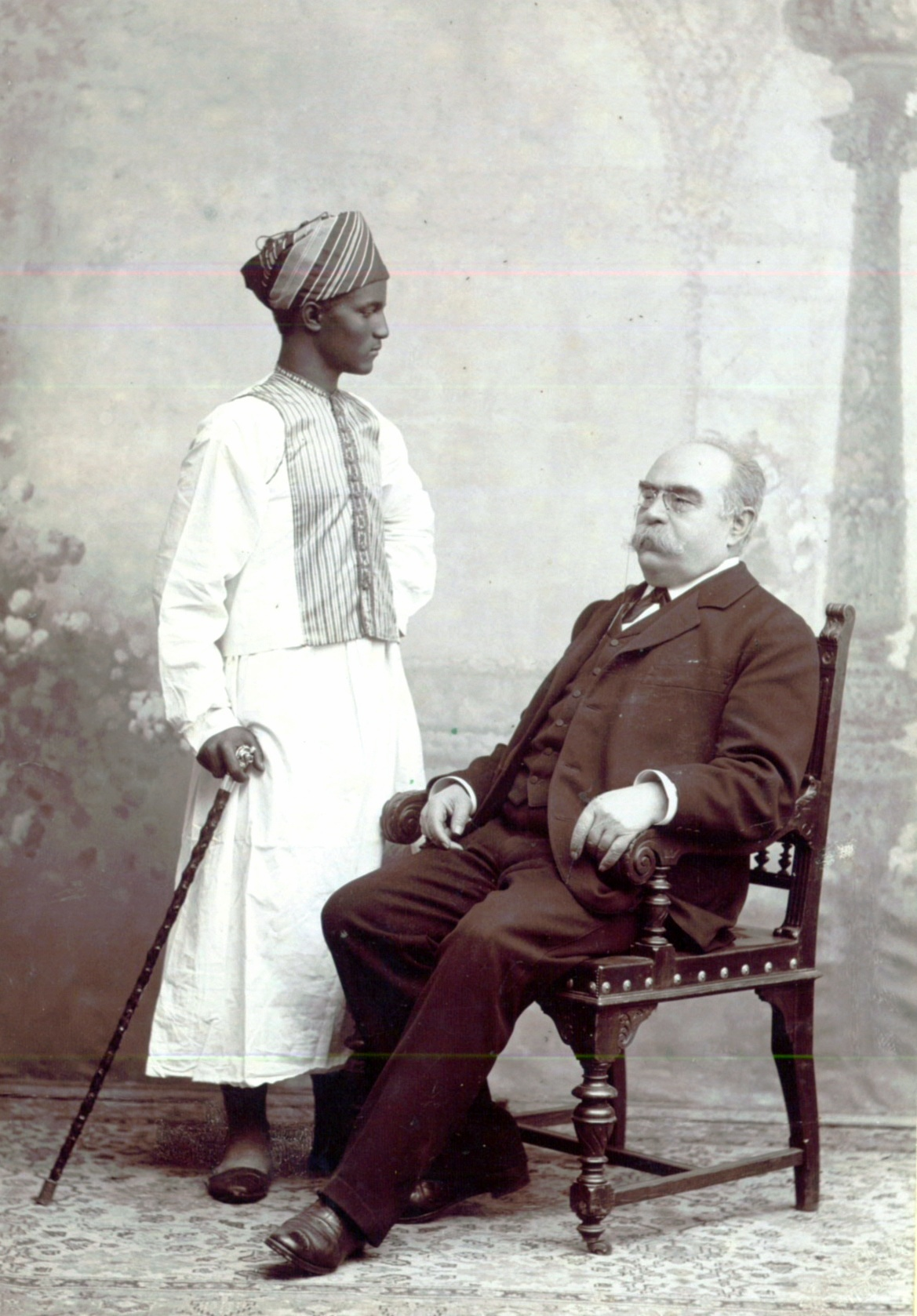
Reinisch with his servant Jusuf

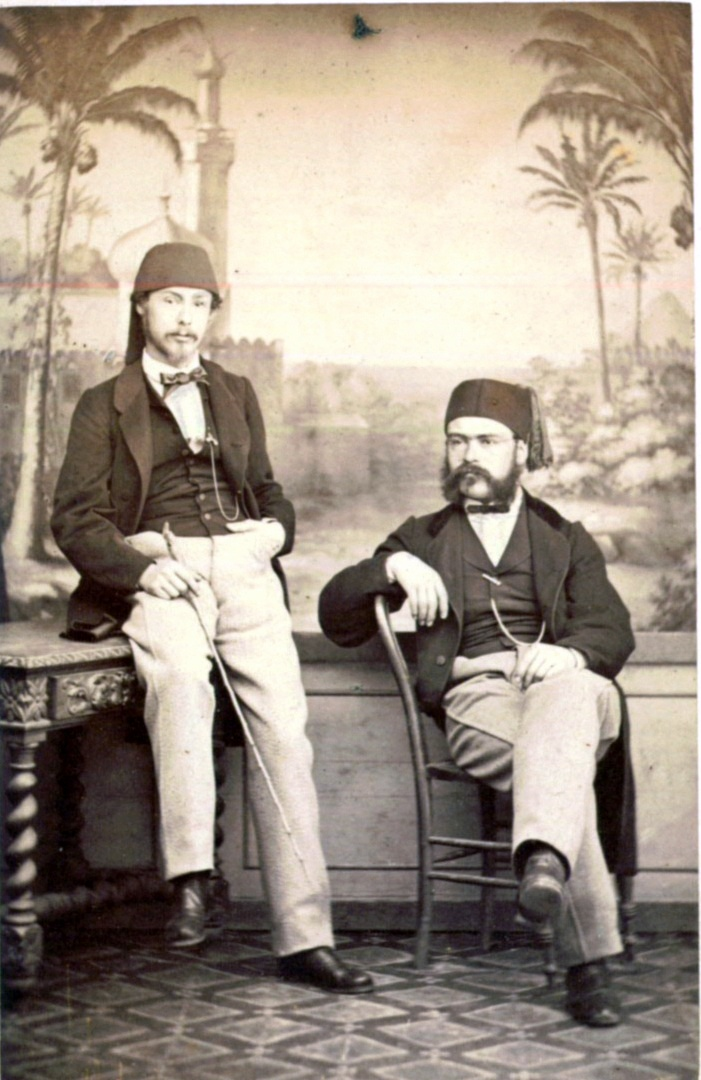
Reinisch (on the right) with Robert Roesler

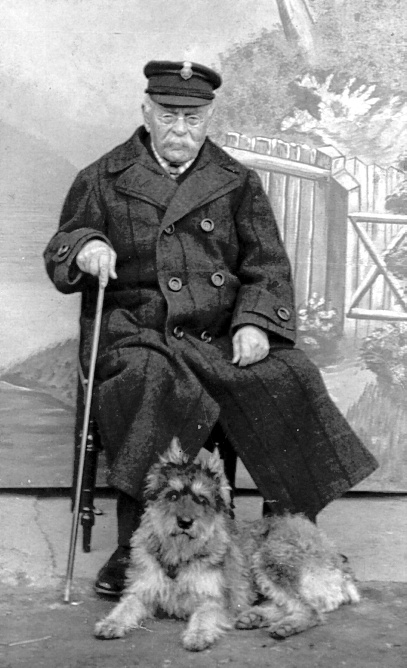
Reinisch with a dog

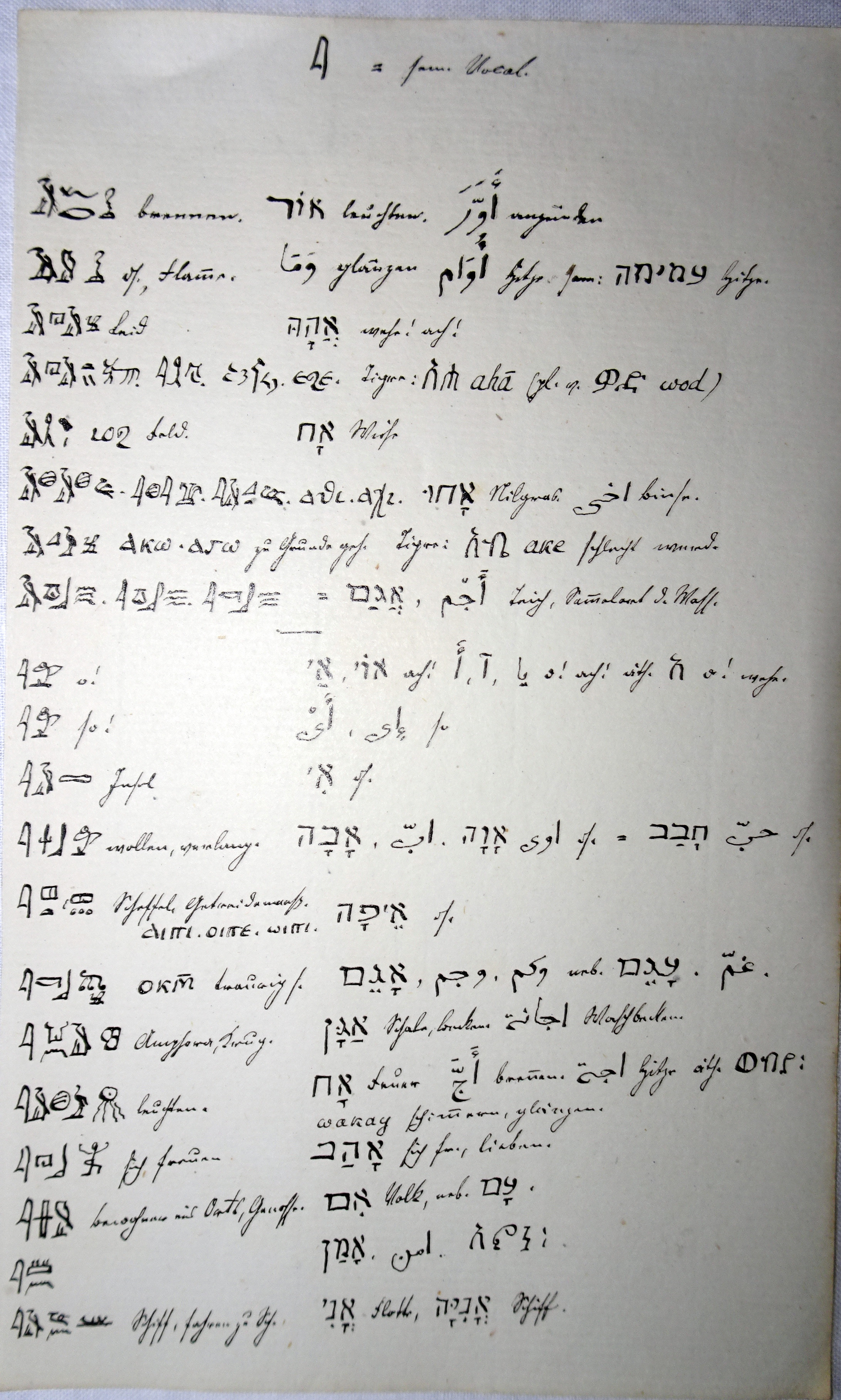
Reinisch's Handwritten studies on hieroglyphs

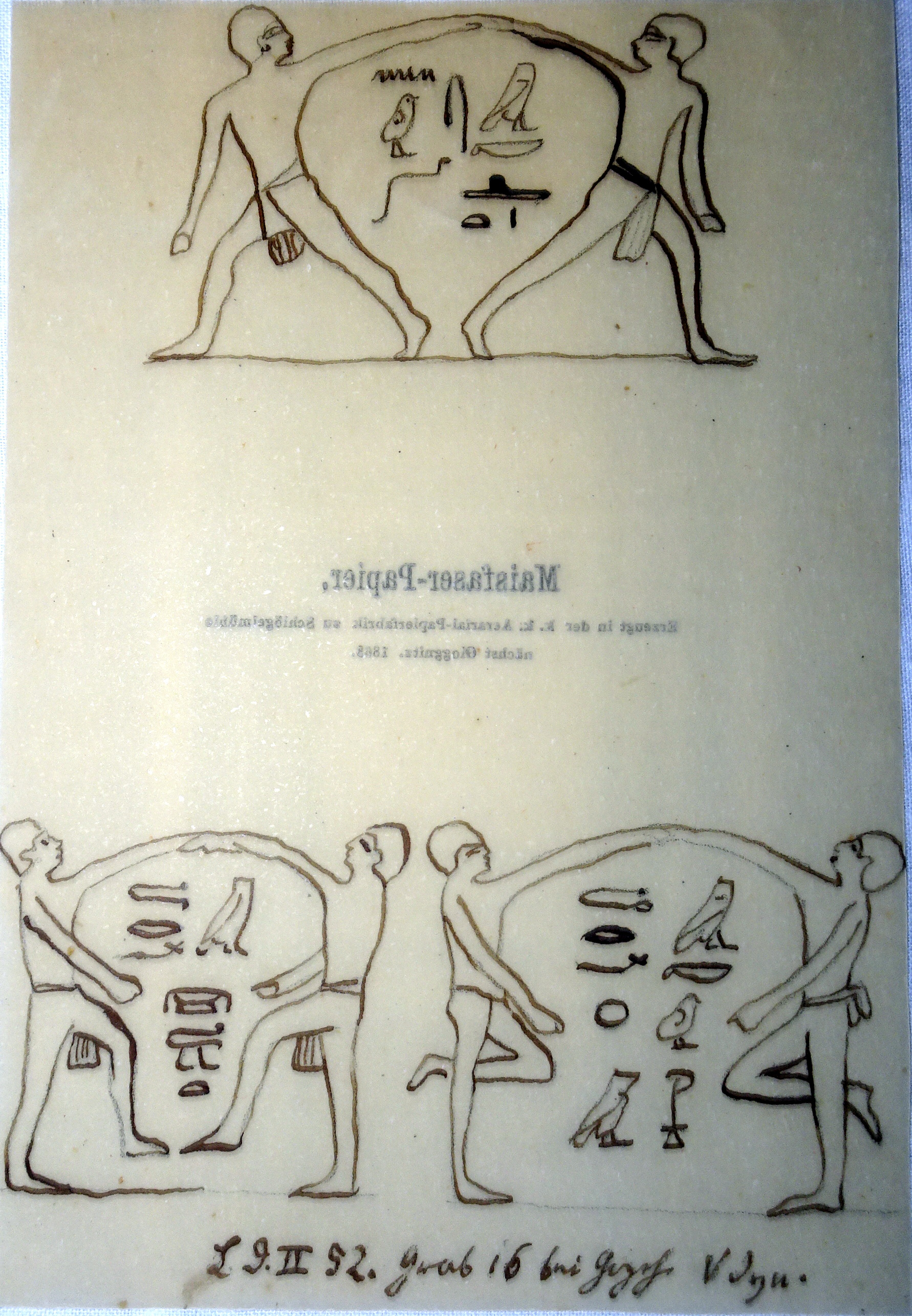
Reinisch's handwritten studies on hieroglyphs in an Egyptian royal tomb 1

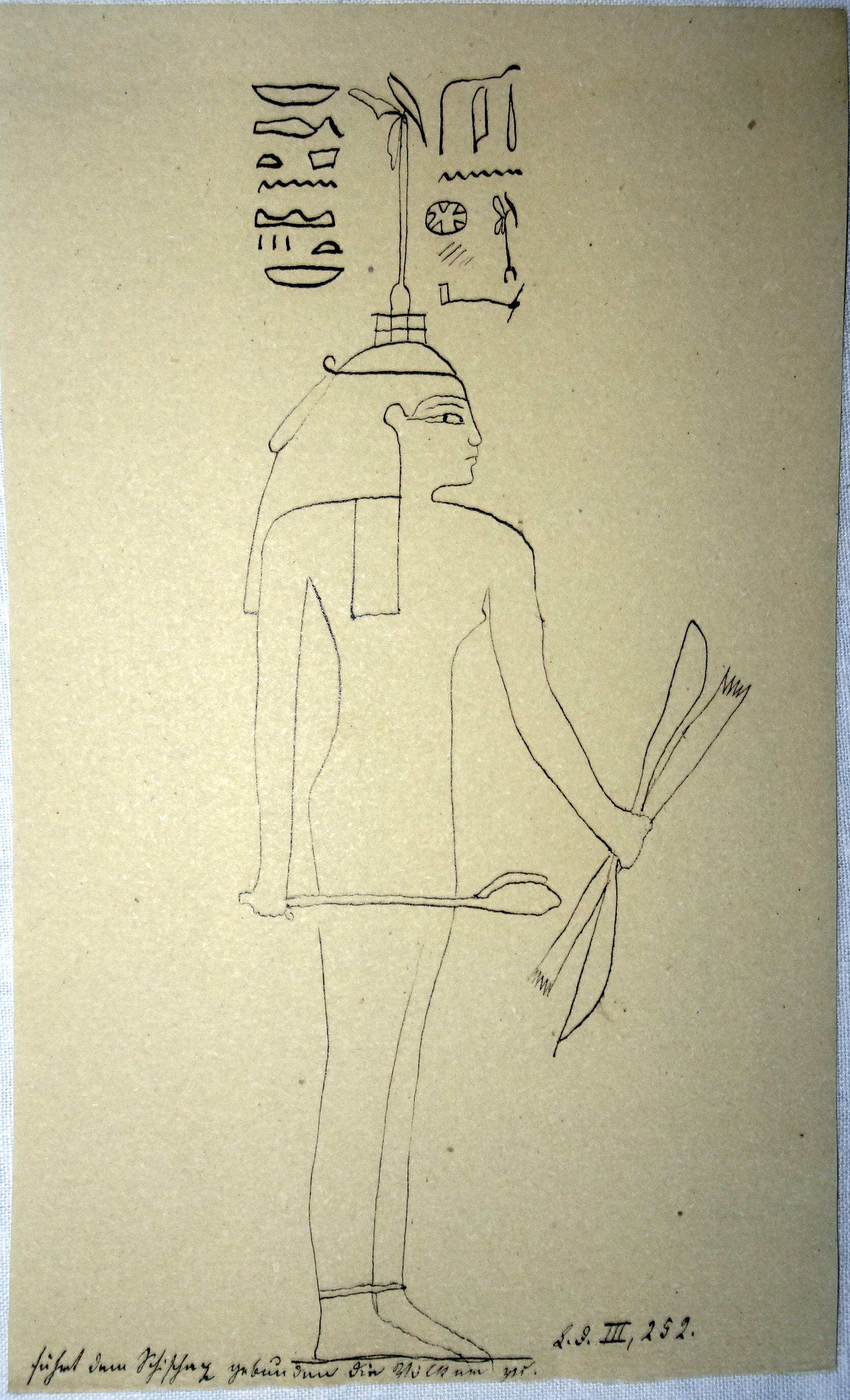
Reinisch's handwritten studies on hieroglyphs in an Egyptian royal tomb 2

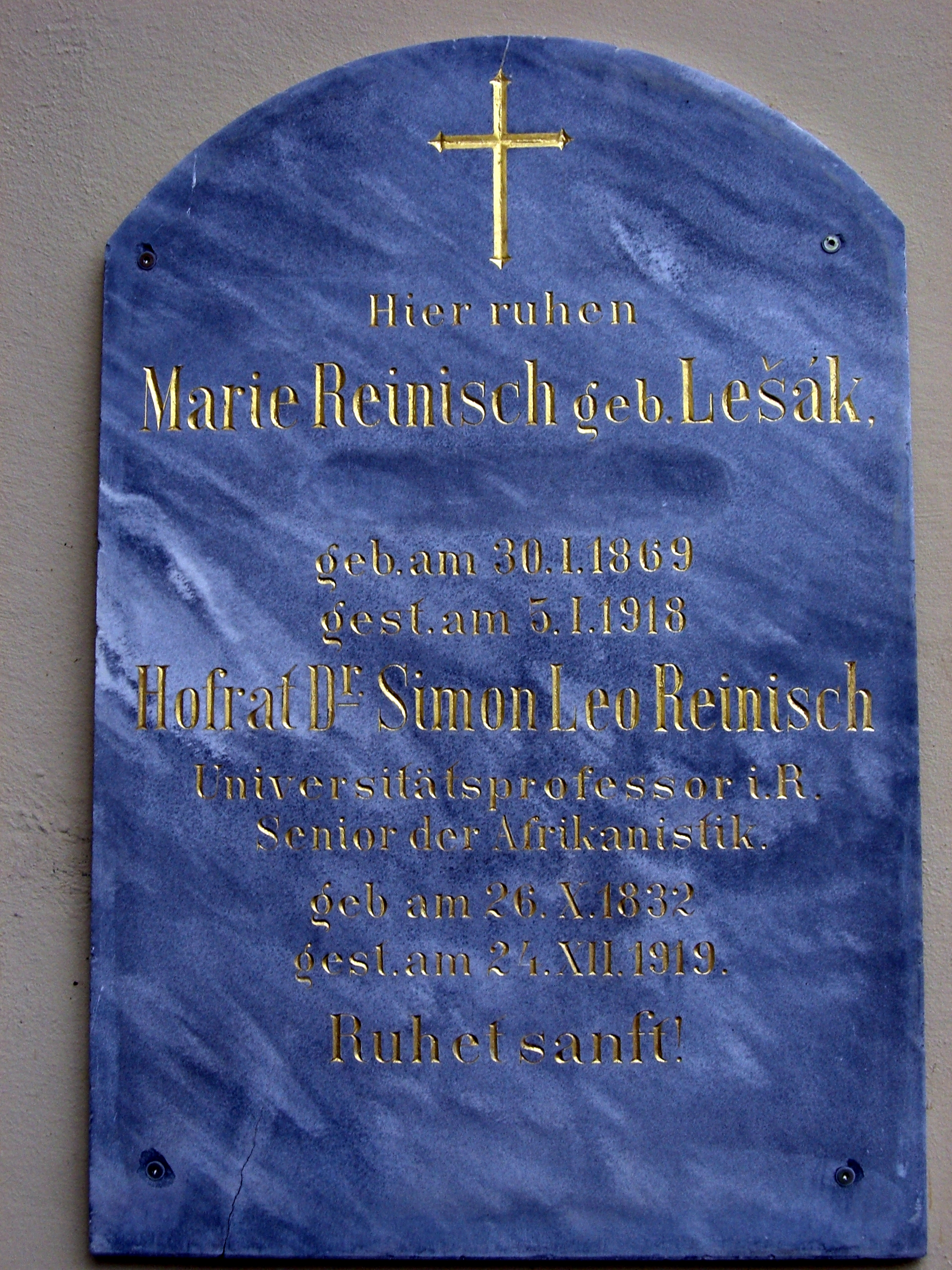
Reinisch's gravestone on the church wall of Maria Lankowitz

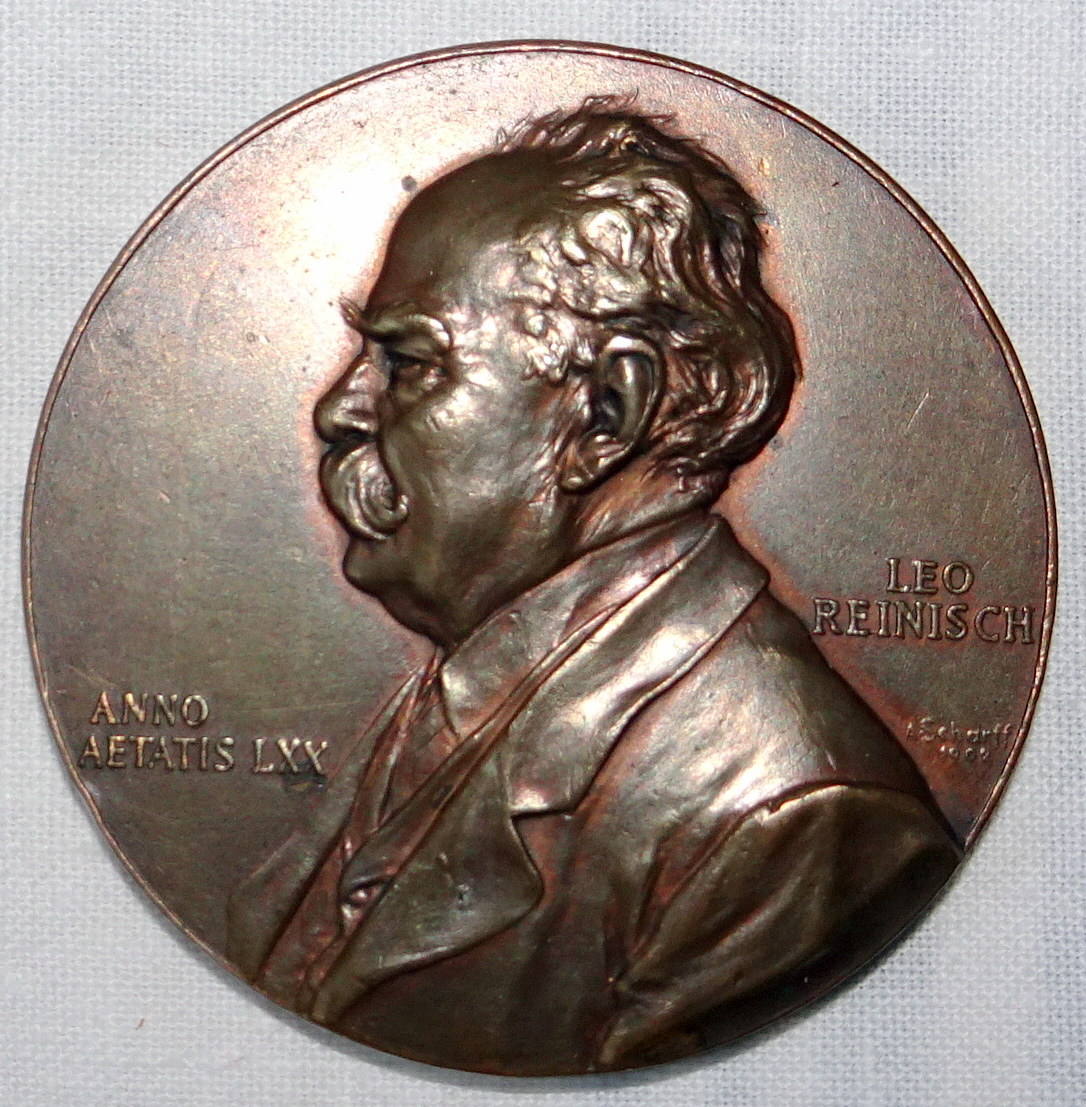
Reinisch's Medal of Honor for his 70th birthday (from the Academy of Sciences (front)

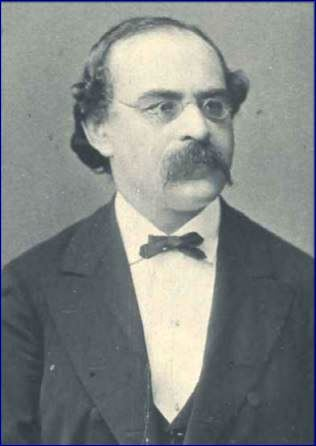
Reinisch in 1878
