= Handalm =

Mountain in the middle of Koralpe

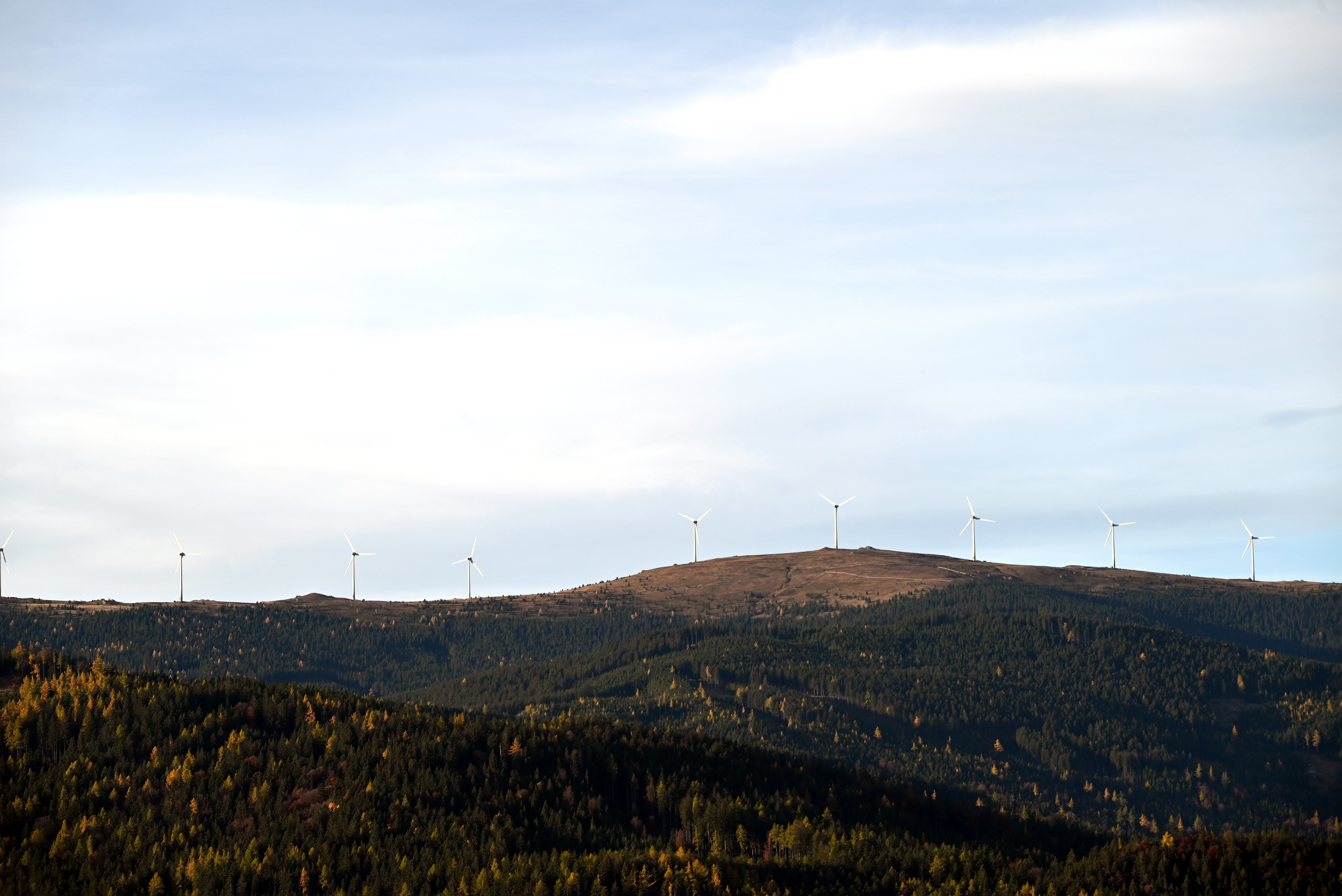

Highest point
- Elevation: 1,853 m (6,079 ft)
- Prominence: 183m
- Coordinates: 46°50′48″N 15°1′11″E

Geography
- Location within Styria
- Location: District of Deutschlandsberg, Styria, Austria
- Parent range: Koralpe

Climbing
- Easiest route: from the wine plain

The Handalm is a mountain located in the middle of Koralpe, standing at an elevation of 1853 meters. It is situated to the north of the Weinebene.

The Brandhöhe (1886 m), located south of the Handalm and itself a pre-peak of the Moschkogel (1916 m), is the next-highest peak. The Handalm's prominence is 183 meters (Weinebenstraße) and its isolation 2.5 kilometers.

== Geography ==
The Handalm is situated on the ridge of the Koralpe range, on the border between Styria and Carinthia. The peak is entirely inside Styria, specifically the municipality of Deutschlandsberg. The border, originating from the northwest, curves south approximately 250 meters south of the Handalm summit, leading towards the Weinebene. The southern slope of the summit falls under the jurisdiction of the Styrian municipality of Schwanberg, while the southwestern slope belongs to the Carinthian municipality of Frantschach-Sankt Gertraud.

The Handalm summit is about 150 meters above the tree line, which ranges from 1700 to 1800 meters in this area. The summit area is characterized by a tiny plateau adorned with several rock formations. The trigonometric point can be found in the northern group of these formations. A spur diverges from the north–south ridge of the Koralpe range, extending towards the east and featuring neighboring peaks such as Moserkogel (Moseralm), Glashüttenkogel, and Kumpfkogel. The village of Osterwitz is located towards the northeast.

The Weberkogel, also called "Wildbachalm", is part of the Koralpe ridge stretching westward from the Handalm. From there, the range turns northward, reaching the area of Hebalm. The source of the Laßnitz River can be found north of the Handalm in vast forests that cover several square kilometers and are largely abandoned. These forests largely belong to the forest estate of the Liechtenstein family. Access to them is limited to closed forest roads that are not open to general traffic. Until 1959, the northern feeder line of the Deutschlandsberg forest railroad used to pass through this region. The Osterwitzbach rises on the north-eastern slope of the Weinebene, and it empties into the Laßnitz at Freiland bei Deutschlandsberg to the south of the Handalm, which provides a connection between western Styria and the Lavant Valley via the Weinebenstraße.

The Handhöhkreuz lies in the saddle between Handalm and Moserkogel. It is a significant site, as it marks the location where the former road connection between Weinebene and Osterwitz crossed the mountain range. Considering the Handalm's elevation and often surrounded by dense fog, Handhöhkreuz serves as a visible path sign.

The Paulus Chapel is located at the Weinebene, near the southern slope of the Handalm. It was built in 1982/83 in honor of St. Paul, the patron saint of long-distance hikers. It houses a statue of St. Paul made of granite from the Waldviertel region, sculpted by Carl Hermann.

== Geology ==
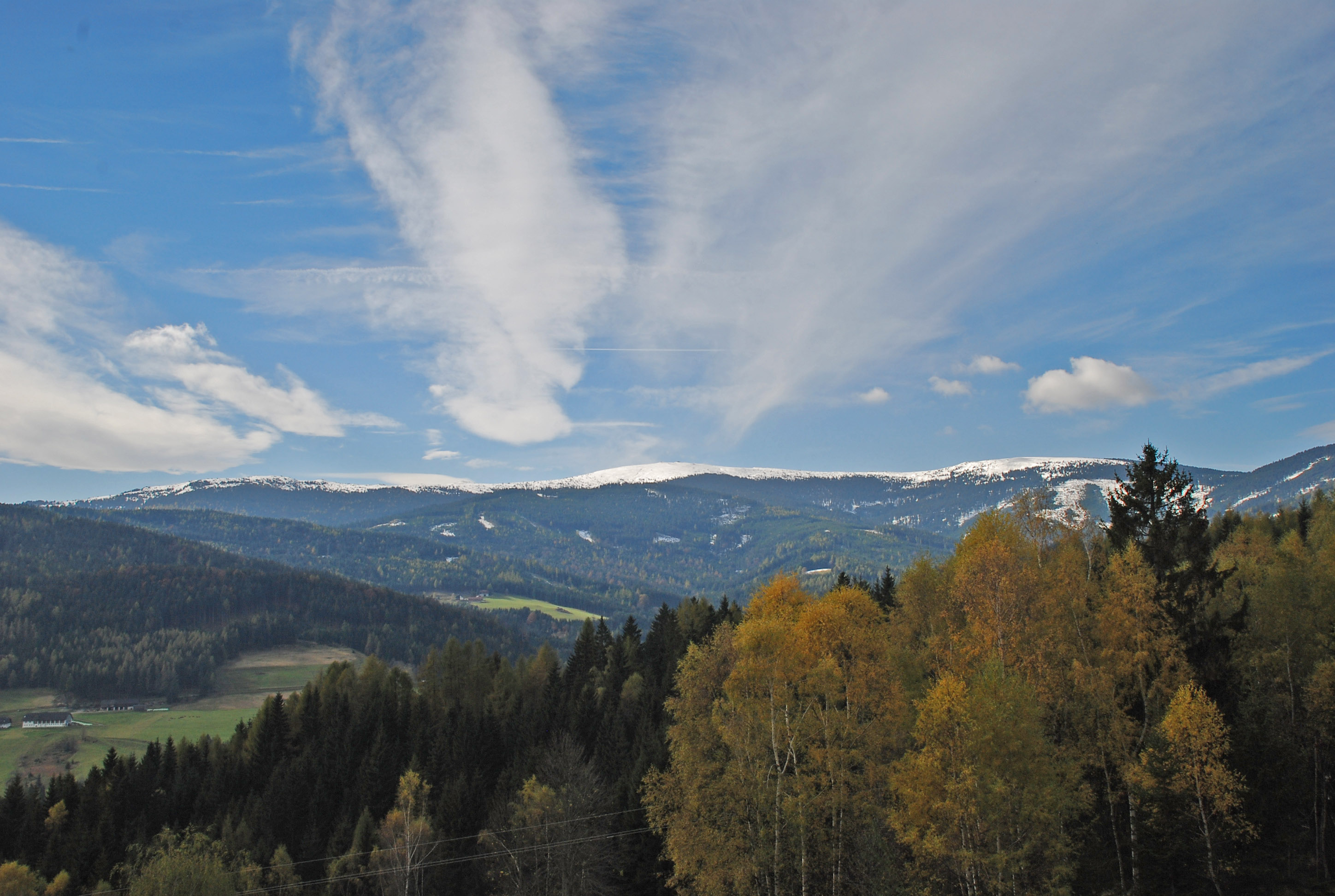
Handalm and subsequent mountains (Handalm middle, left Glashüttenkogel with the Moseralm, right Weberkogel/Wildbachalm). In the foreground monastery, on the left Fastlbauer farm in Osterwitz.

The Handalm is predominantly composed of metamorphic rock known as Koralm crystalline. This rock formation primarily consists of gneiss, which was formed under high pressure and high temperatures conditions. The gneiss in the Handalm is distinguished by centimeter to decimeter-thick plates with garnet crystals. Specifically, the rock type found in the Handalm is referred to as "Plattengneis Typus Stainz: blastomylonitic, planar eye gneiss." It is one of the eight documented Plattengneis regions in the eastern part of the Koralpe, known as "Complex 5 Handalm-Trahütten." The slab gneiss in this area has a primary strike direction of northwest–southeast, with a dip angle of up to 30 degrees. Furthermore, the rock's lineation is tilted by approximately 15 degrees towards the north. These geological characteristics provide insights into the processes that shaped the formation of the Koralpe region.

The slopes of the Handalm consist largely of slope debris and rubble heaps (from the Würm), with some pegmatites and marble lenses. The geology of the Handalm has also been extensively examined, as the geology of the entire Koralpe; in addition to the works of Peter Beck-Mannagetta, whose specialty was the Koralpe geology, other authors also dealt with this subject early on.

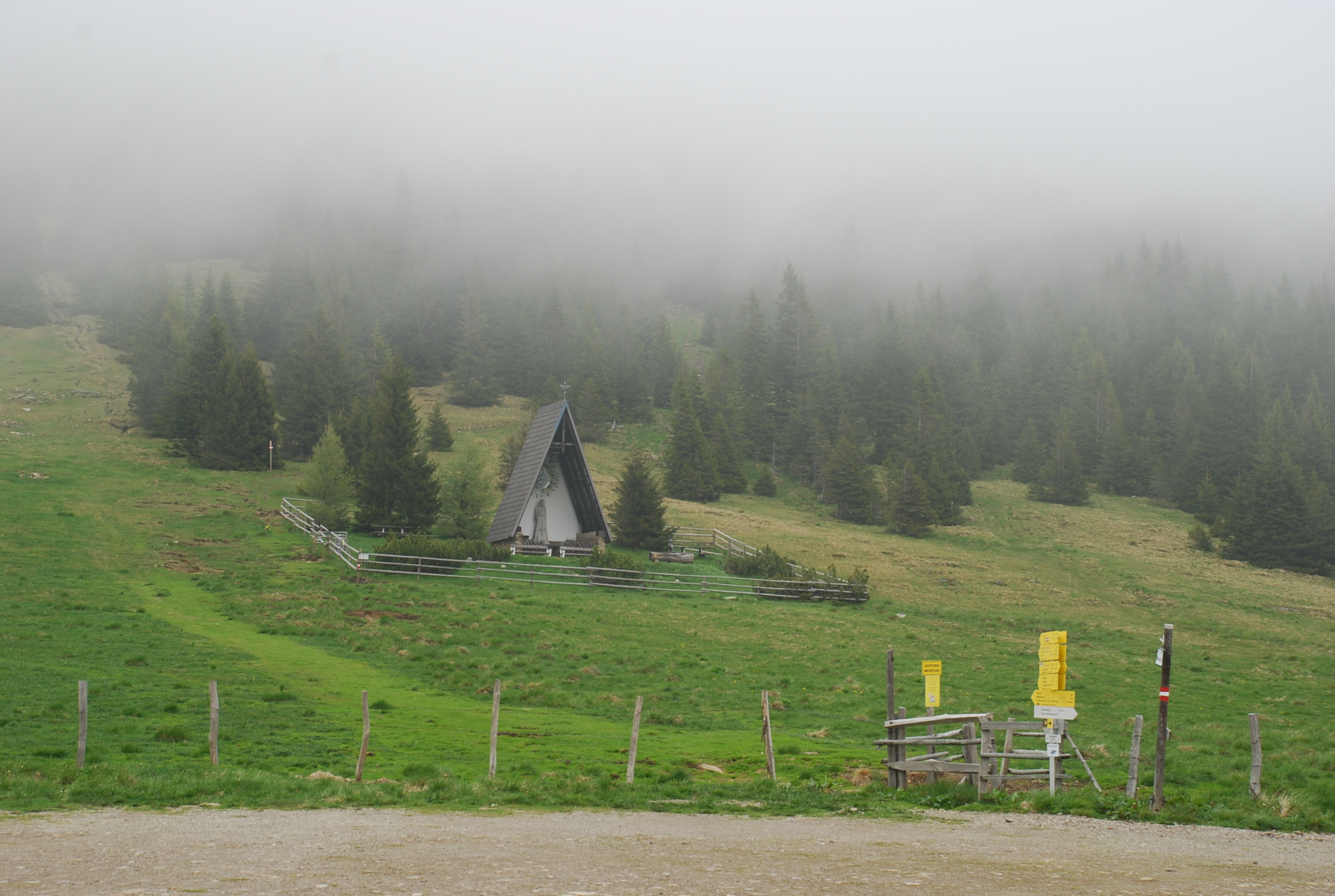
The Paulus chapel on the southern slope of the Handalm on the Weinebene

The Handalm lacks a distinct summit area. This characteristic can be attributed to the geological nature of the Koralpe, the mountain range in which the Handalm is situated. The Koralpe is geologically classified as a "pultscholle", which means it is part of a mountain range that was raised as a whole. Unlike other mountains that formed, the individual peaks of the Koralpe, including the Handalm, were shaped by uneven weathering of specific rock areas. The Koralpe, including the Handalm, acquired its present-day form during the final stages of the Alps' mountain-formation process, which occurred approximately 20 million years ago.

It is unclear whether the Handalm was glaciated during the ice ages. One map depicts a glacial, whereas another publication claims that no moraine remains, indicating a glaciation, were discovered.

The eastern ridge arising from the Handalm is regarded as major evidence of the Koralpe's original structure. It suggests that the mountain range has a tectonic alignment with a northwest–southeast strike. This alignment was subsequently modified to a north–south orientation. Additionally, the Handalm is located at the northern end of a broad uplifted section of the Koralpen mountain block known as the "Wolfsberg anticline". However, without specialized information, it is no longer recognizable in the field.

Whether the deposit of lithium, which was discovered south of the Weinebene, extends to the area of the Handalm is an open question, because the extent of this deposit has not yet been explored.

== Rock ovens ==
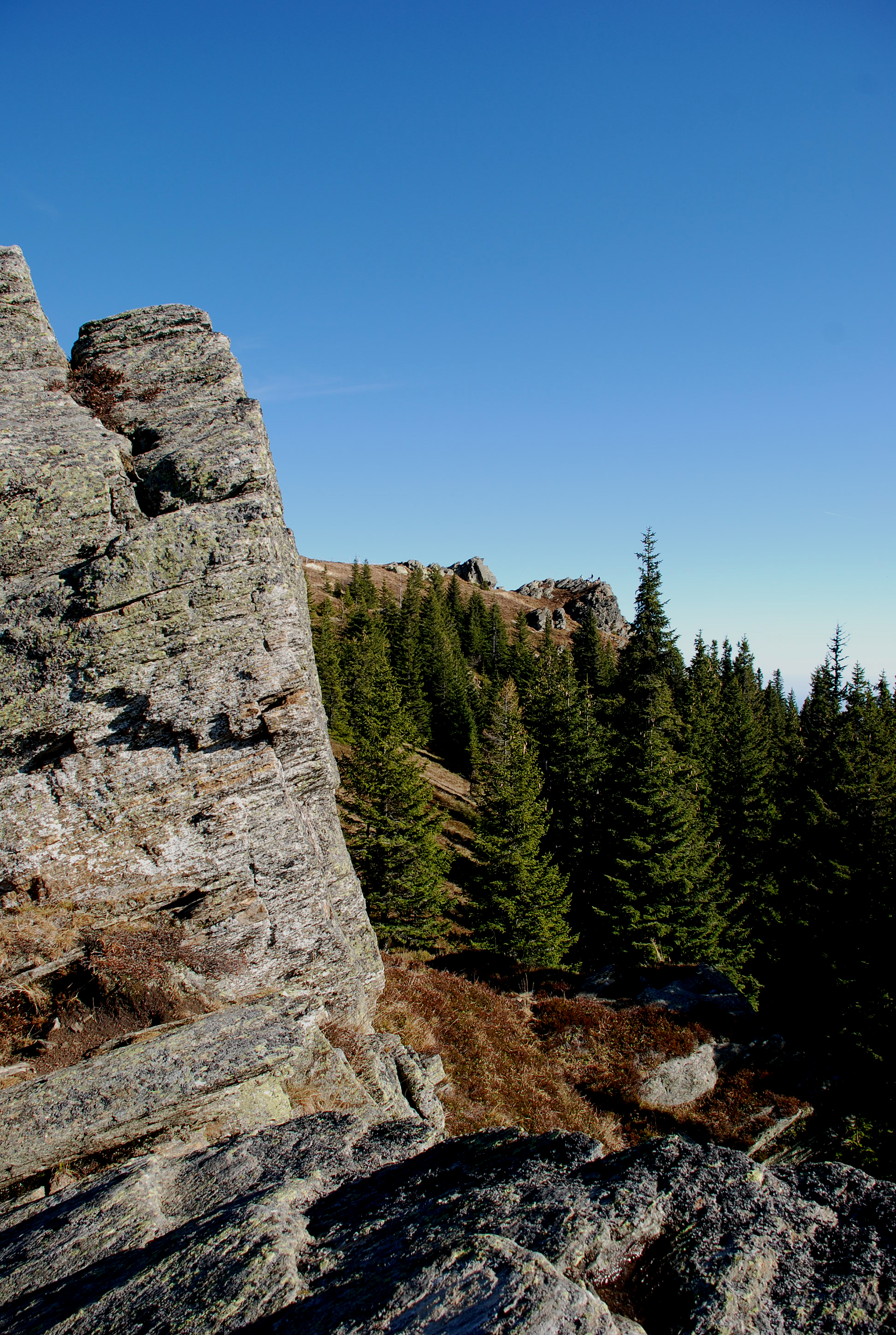
South wall of an oven on the south side of the Handalm on the way to the Handhöhkreuz

The Handalm is distinguished by rock groups, known as furnaces, which emerge from the gently undulating alpine pasture floor. These formations result from the uneven weathering of the Handalm's rock composition, which is primarily made up of stacked gneiss plates. This section of the Handalm forms an integral part of the Koralm Kristall Trail's daily stage.

Rock furnaces
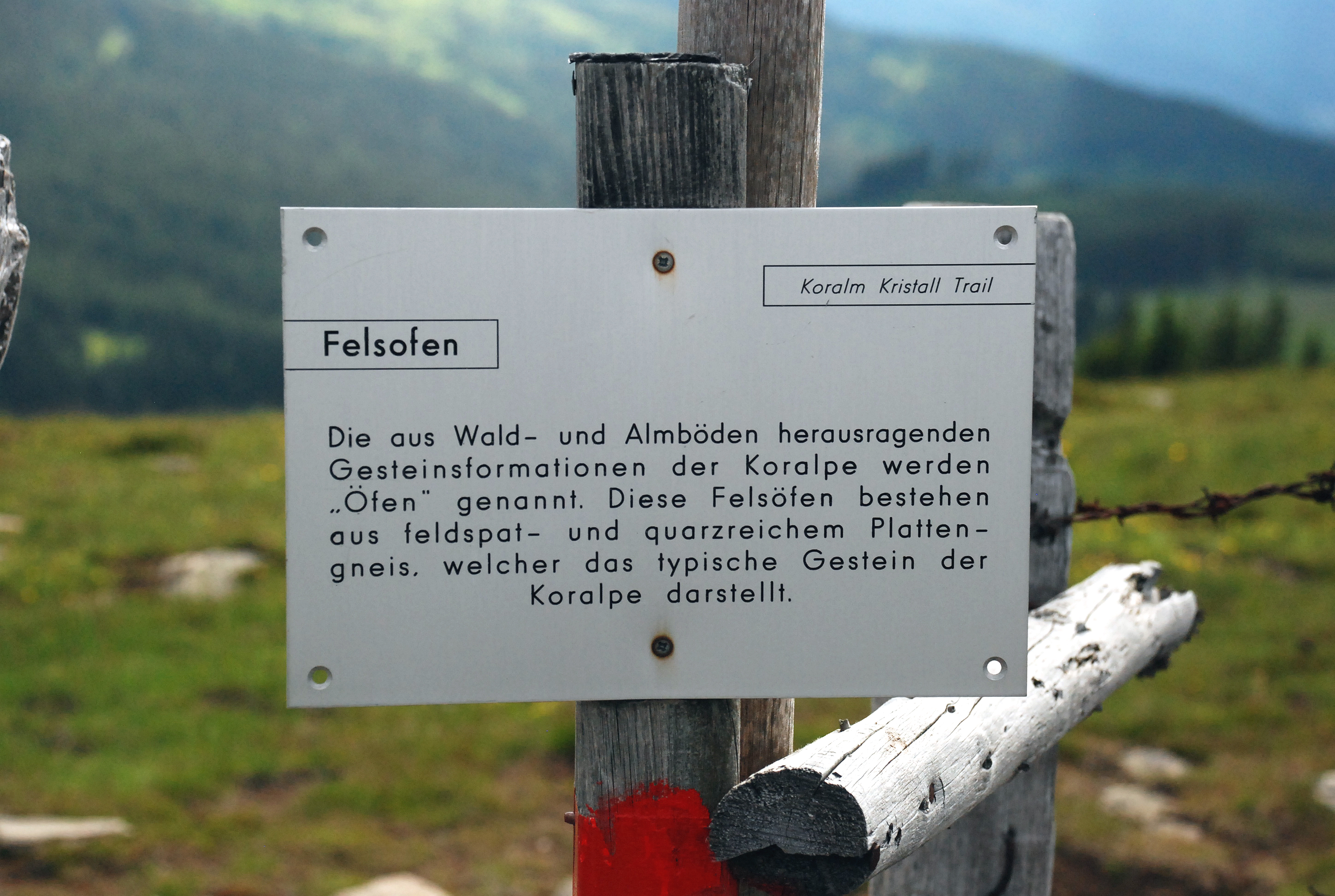

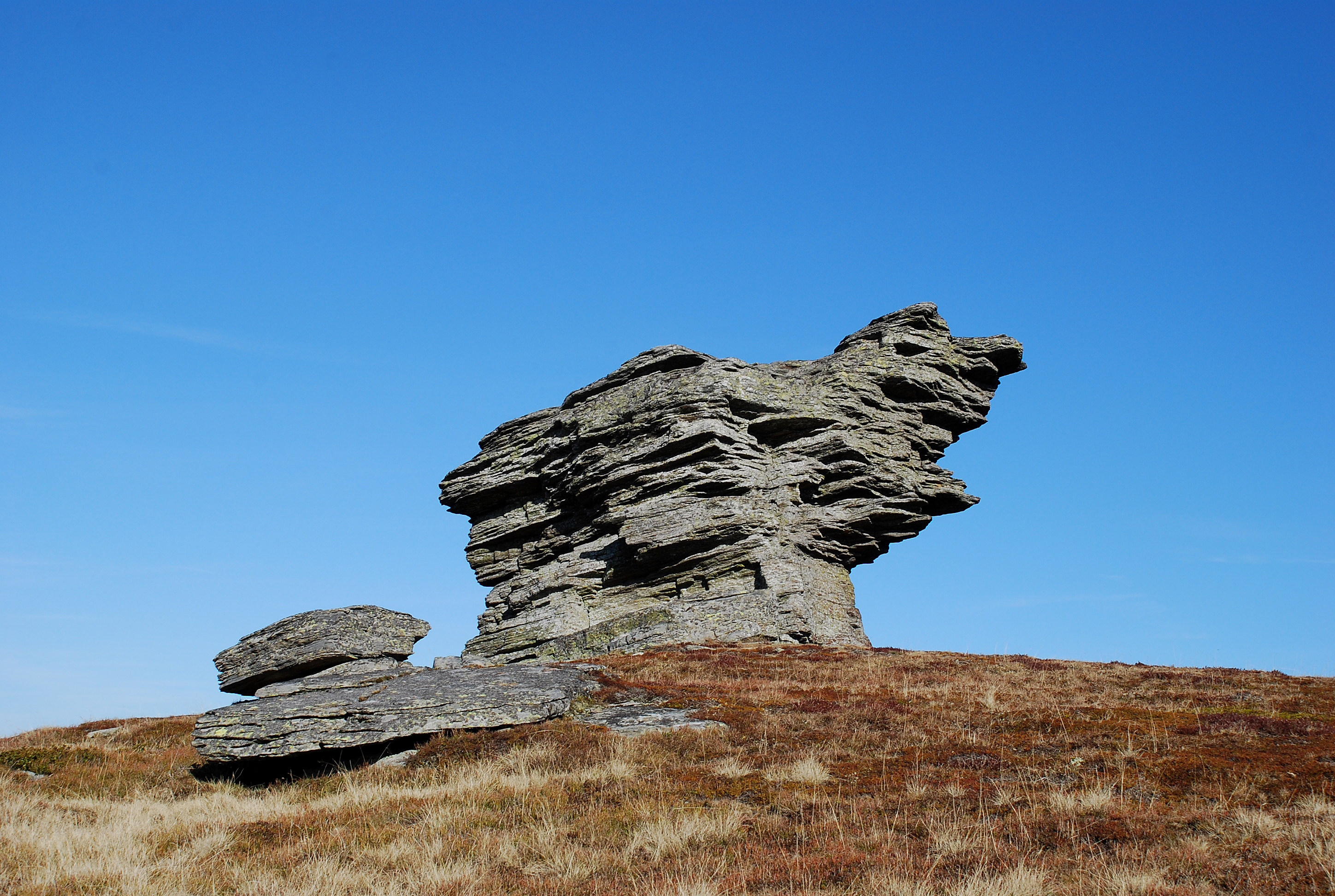

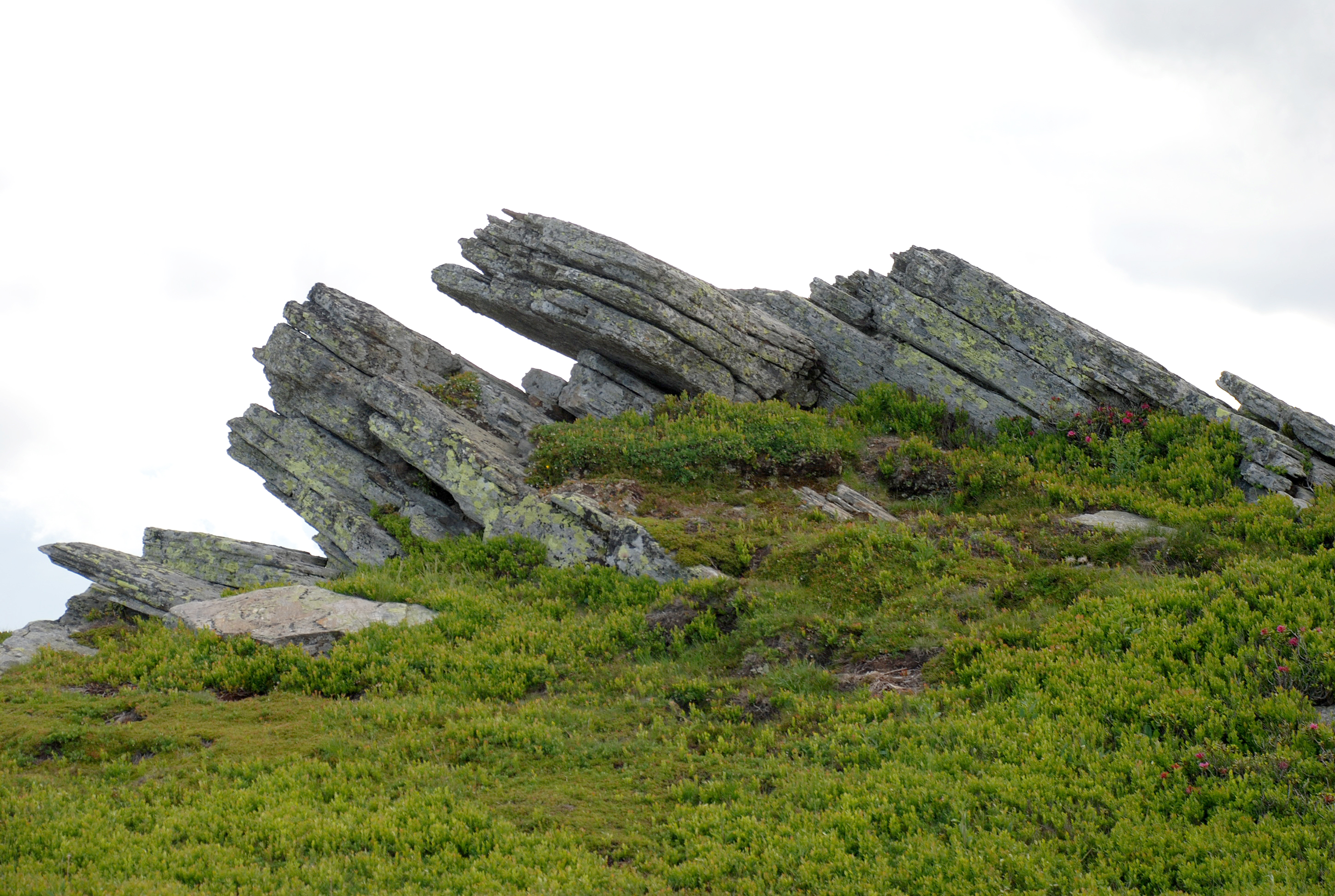

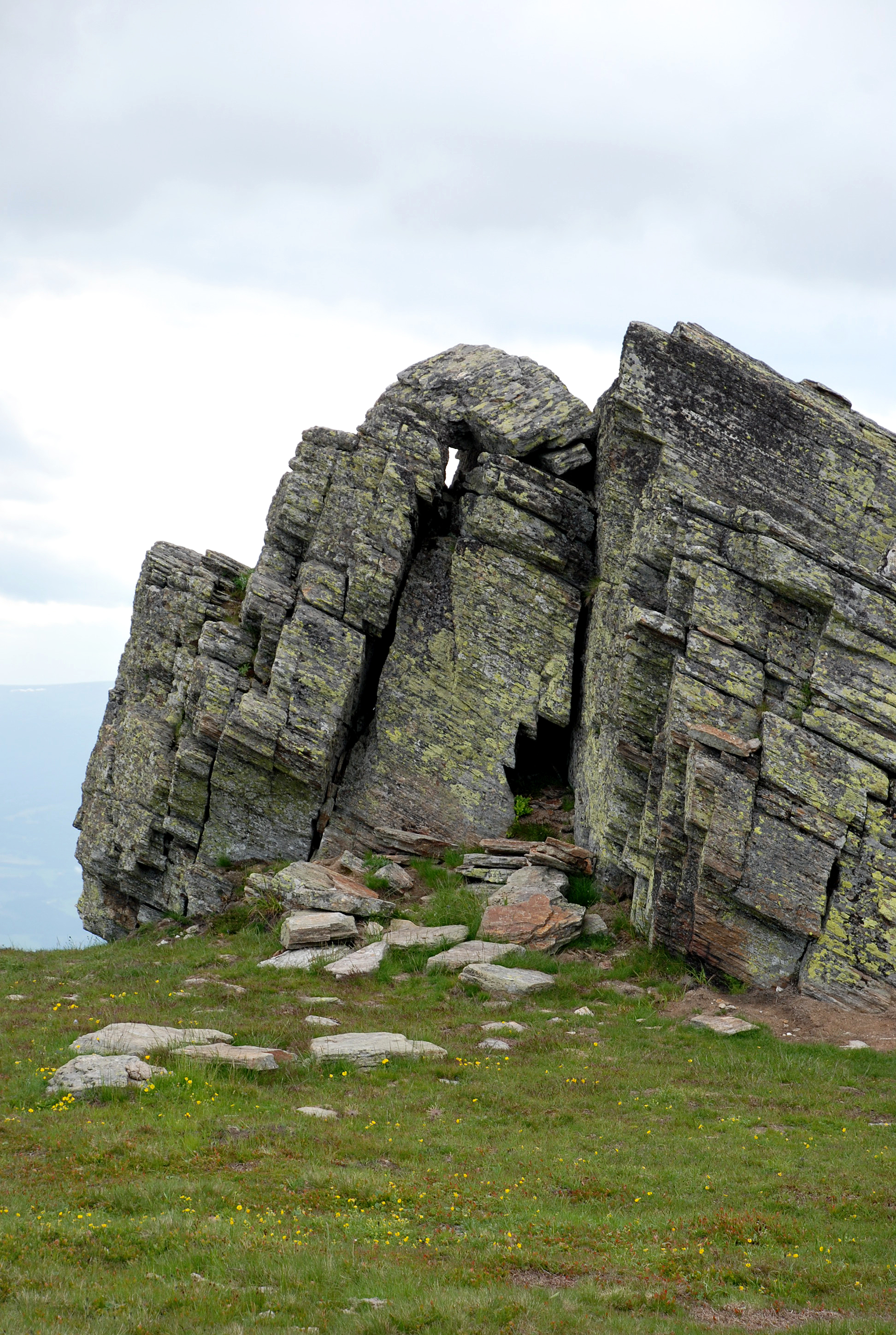

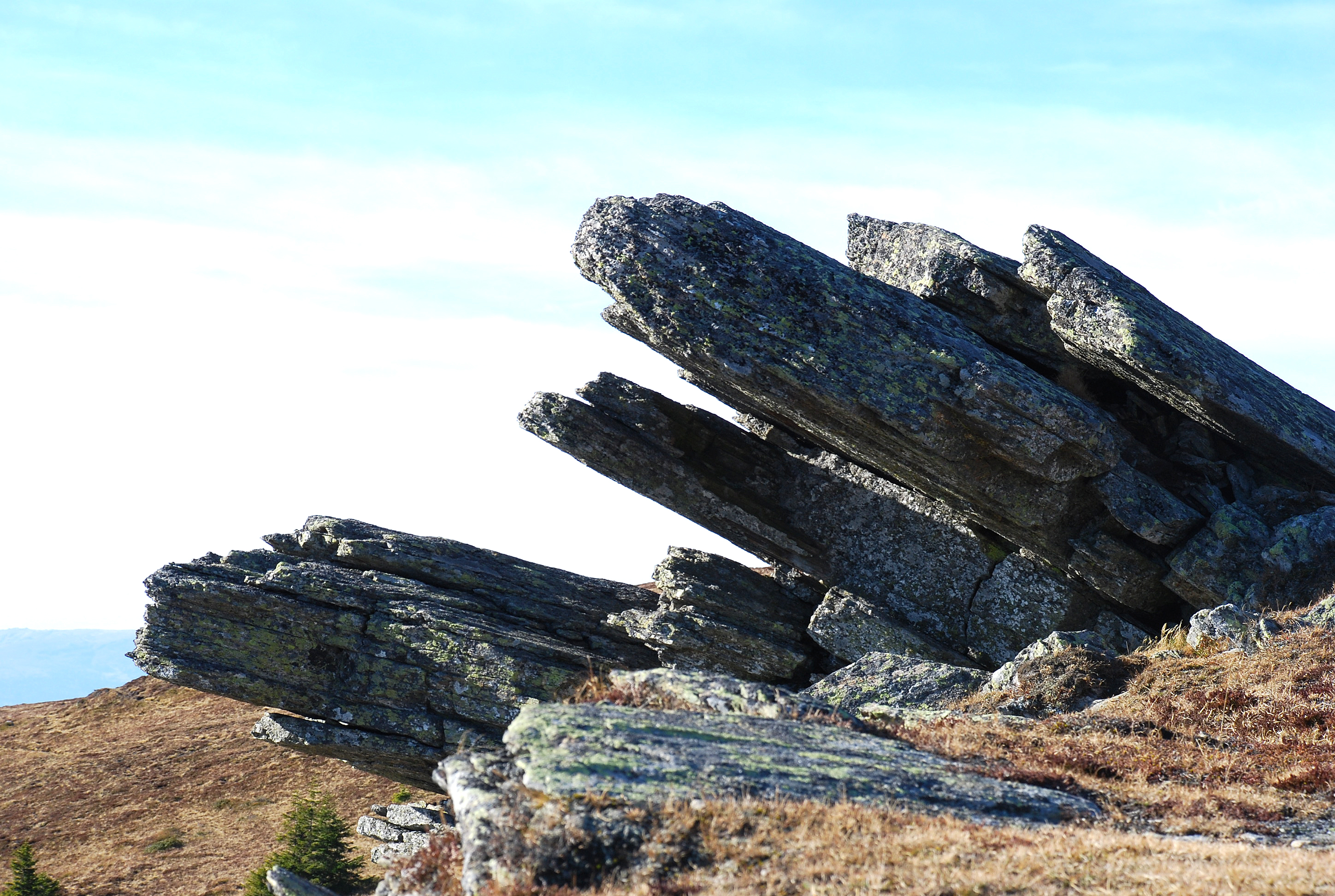

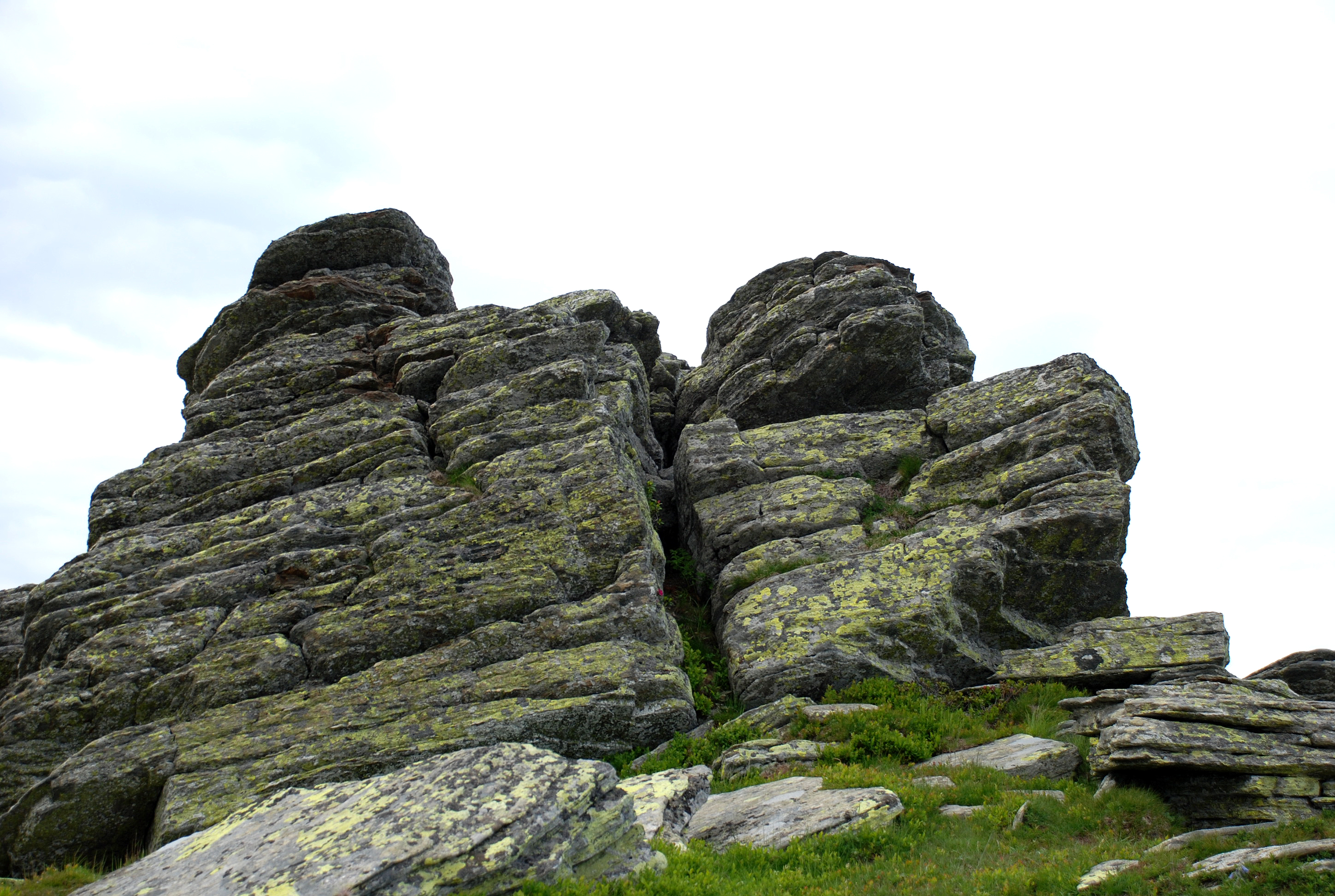

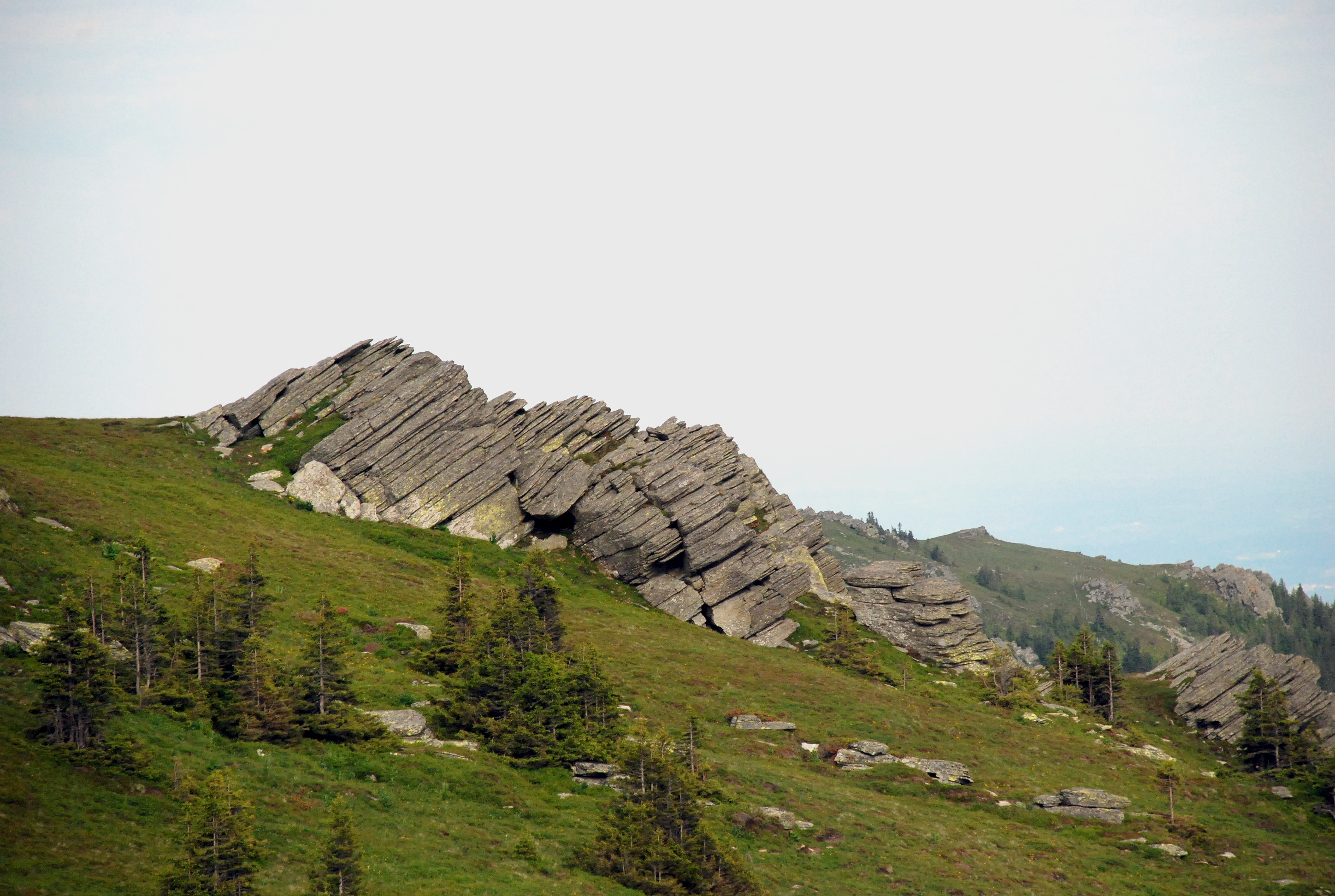
Handalm, mountain in the middle Koralpe, Lavanttal Alps, Austria, weathering in the plate gneiss

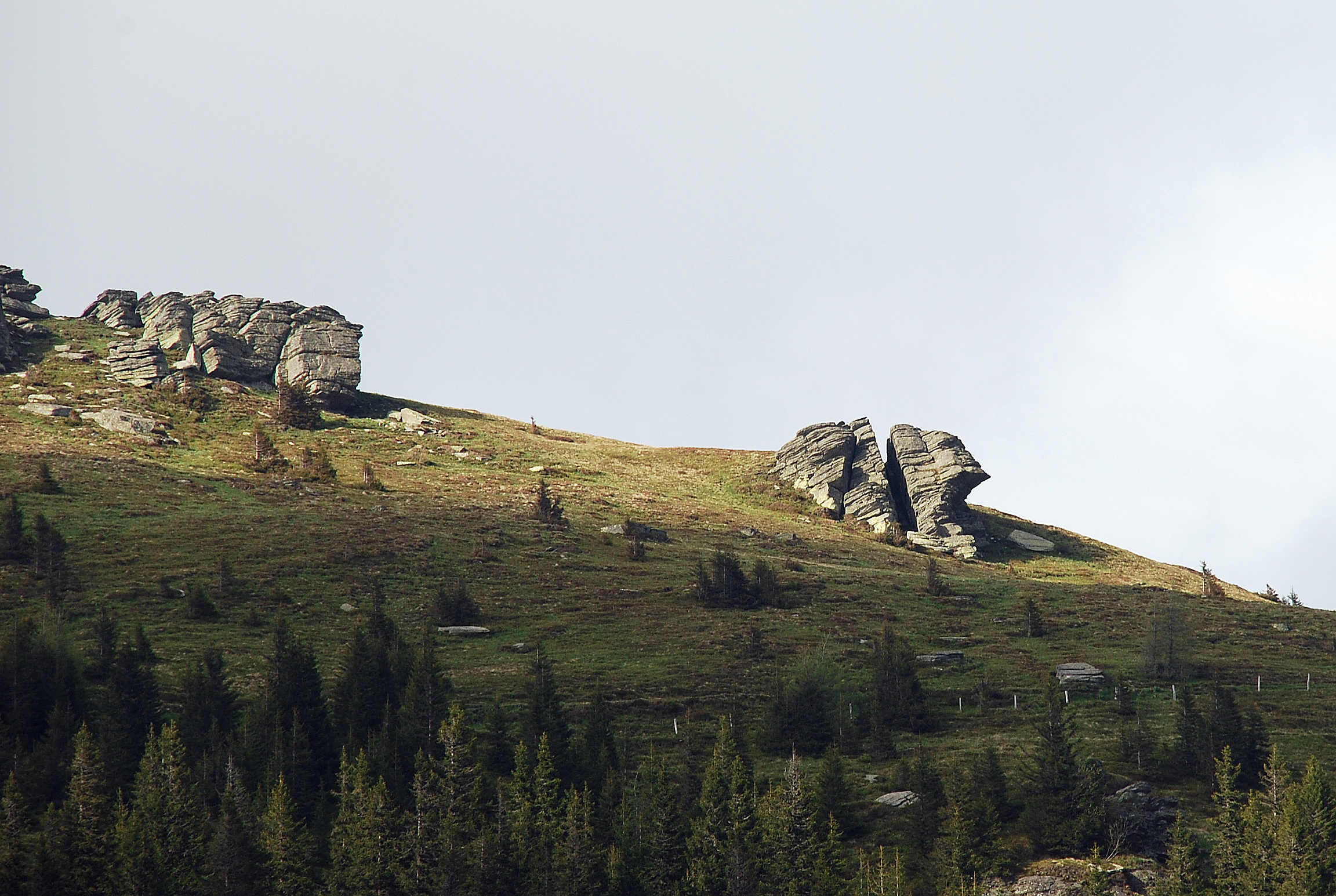
Rock formations, so-called "Furnace" (Steinöfen, weathering forms from plate gneiss) on the Handalm, middle Koralpe, Styria, Austria

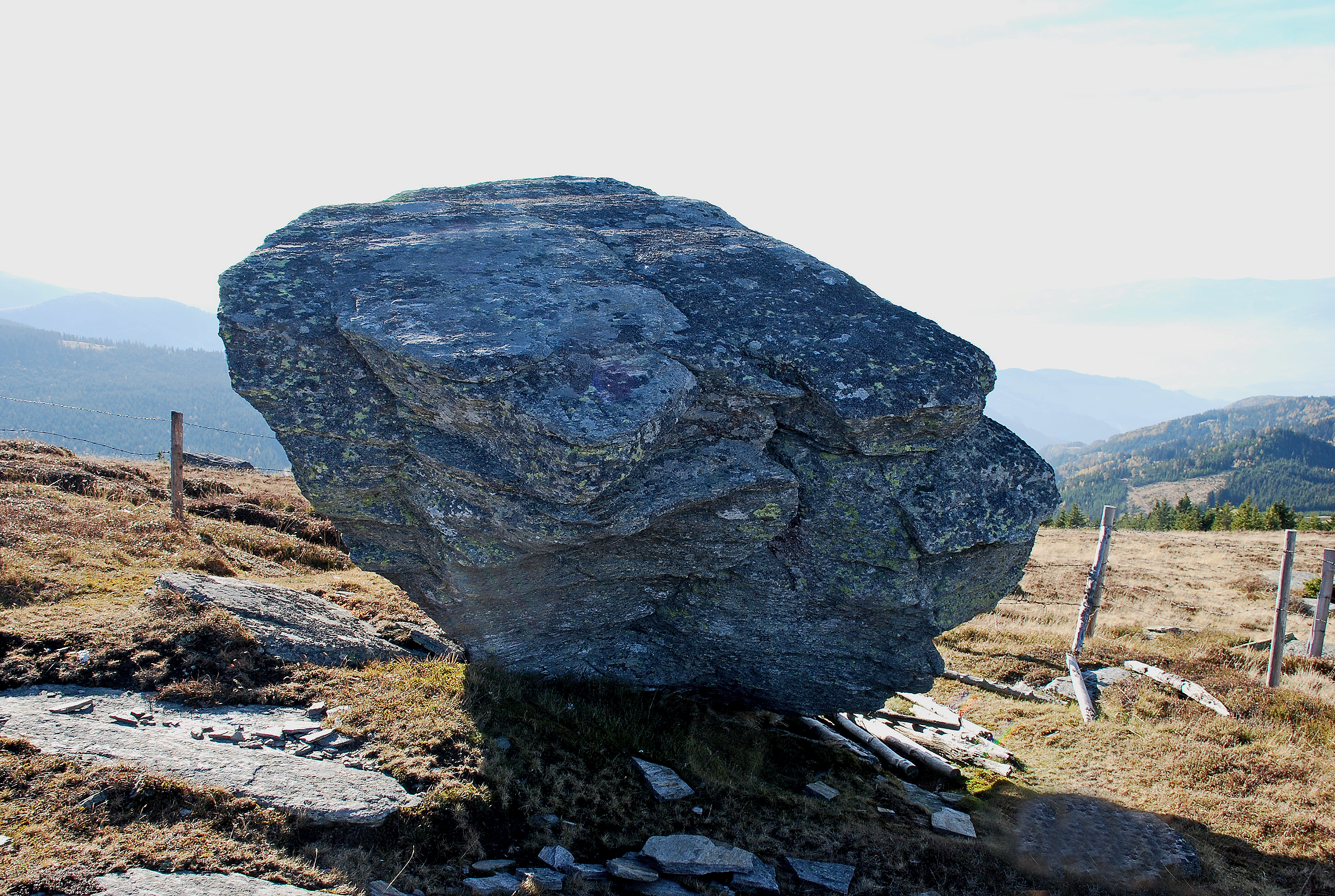

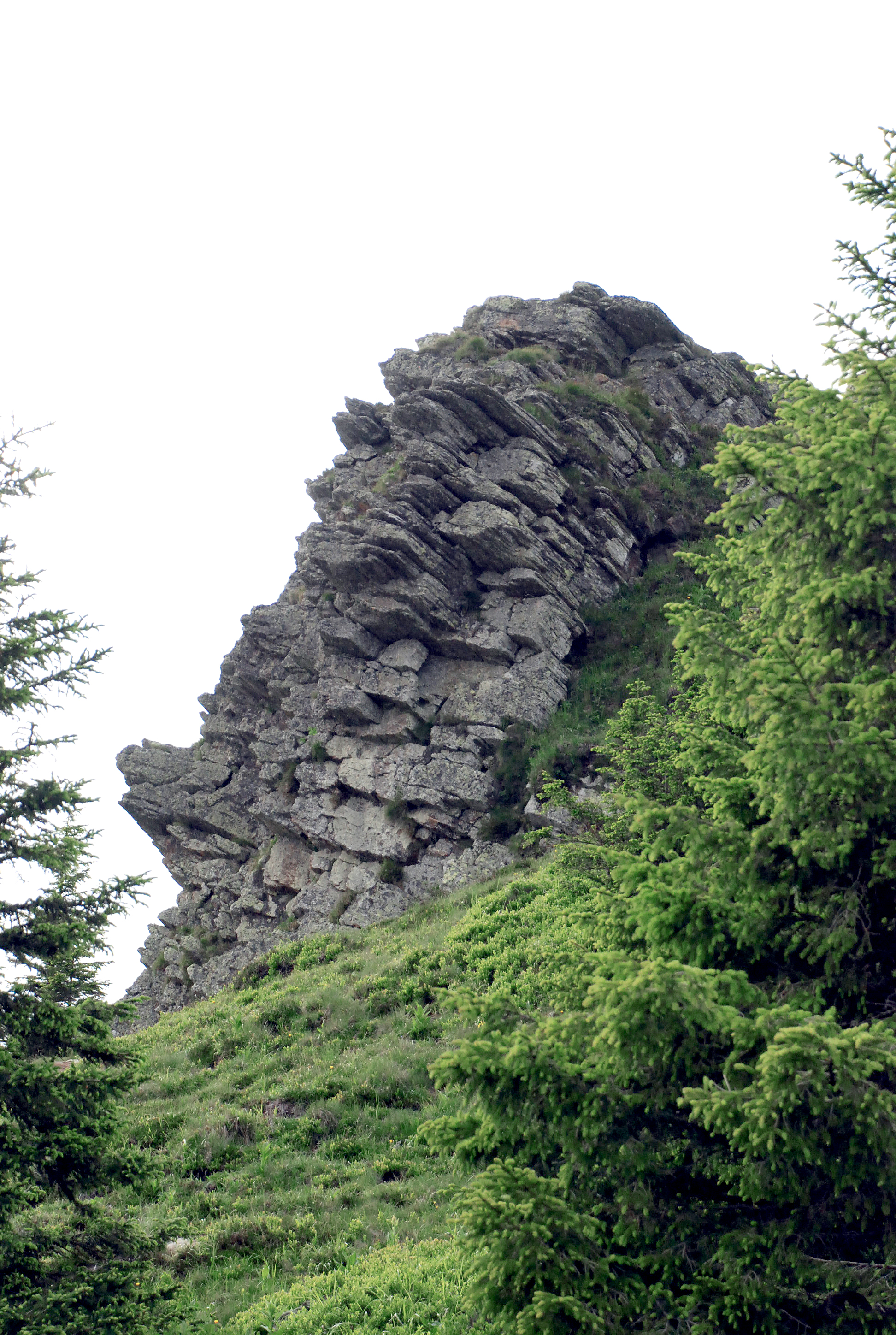

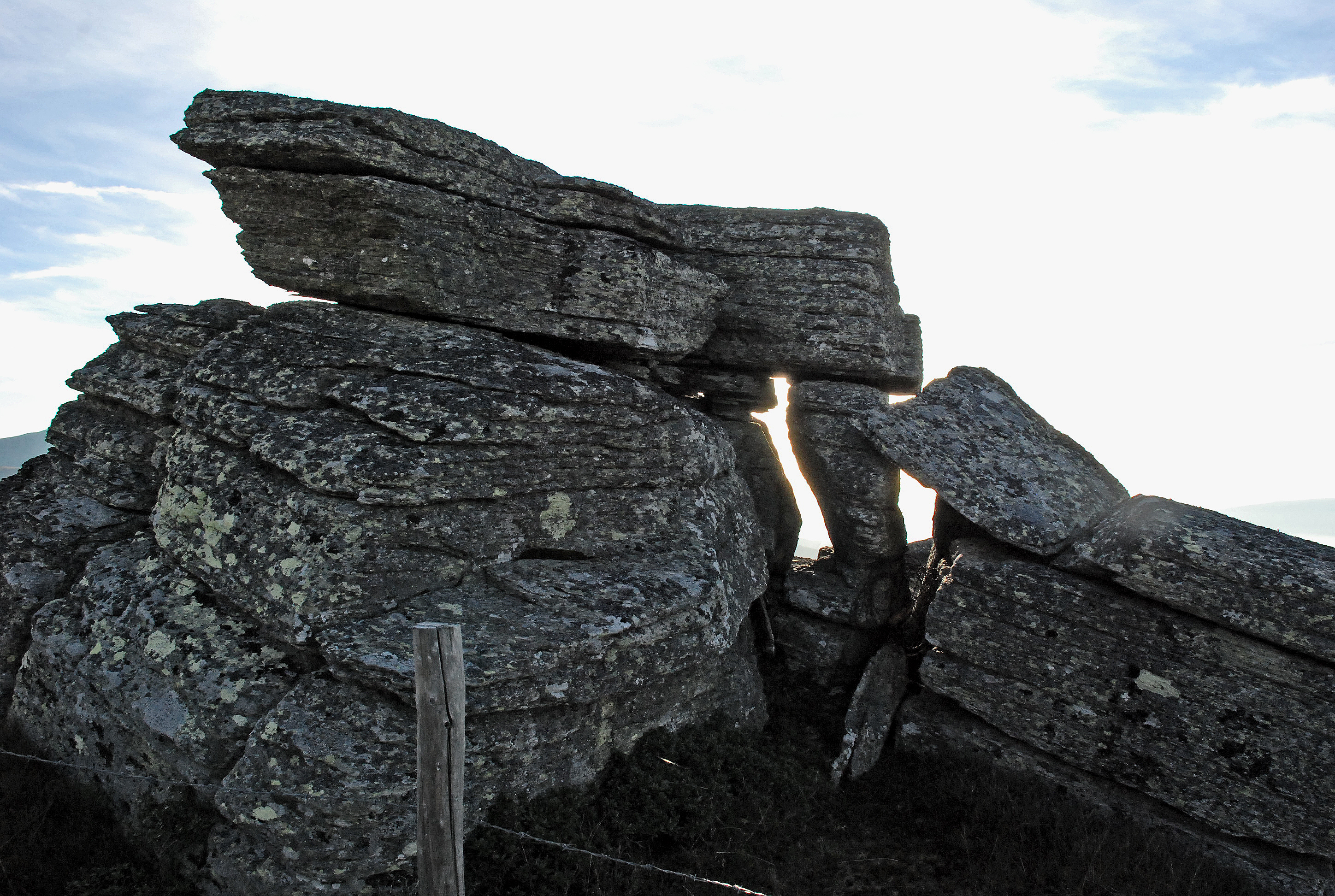

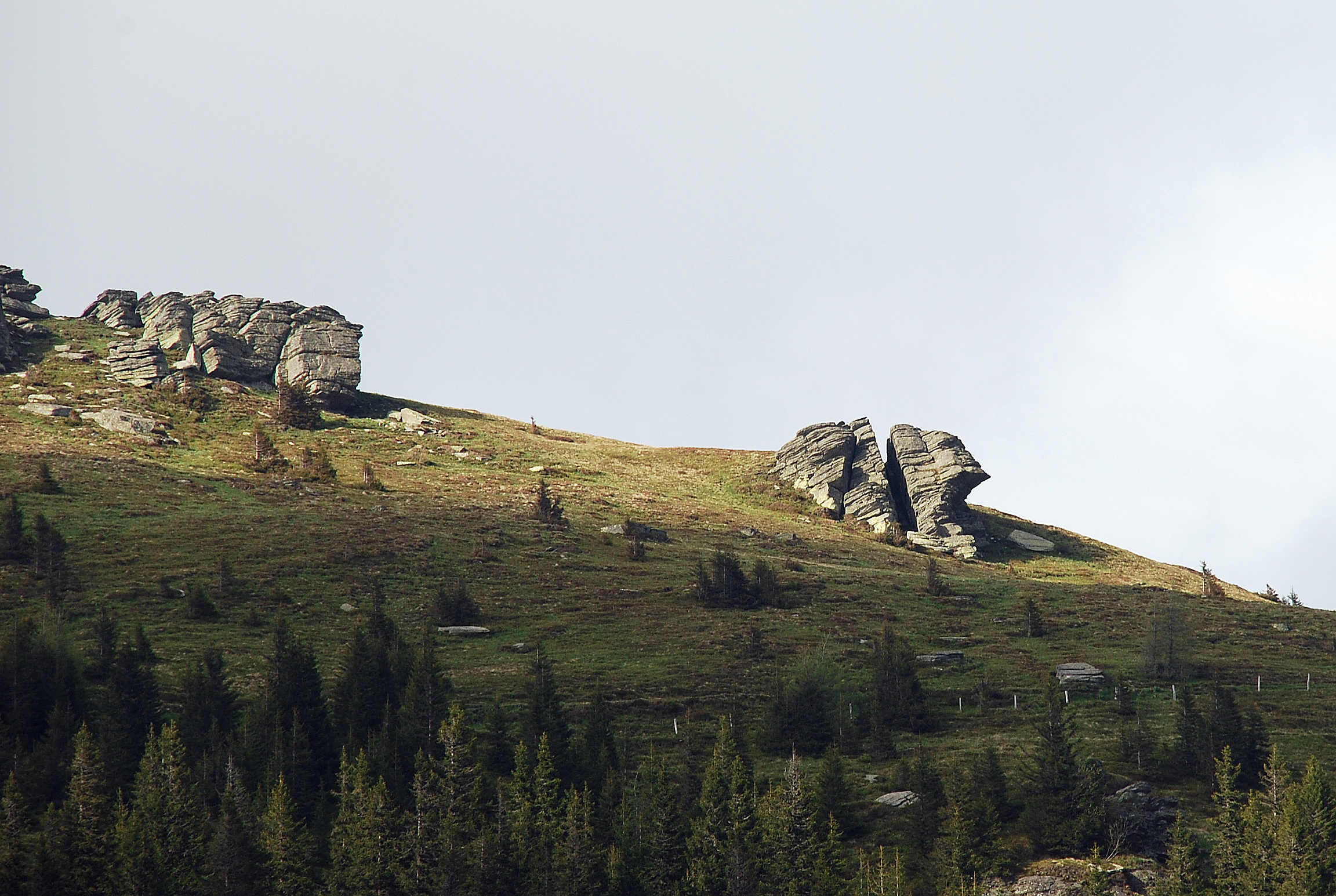

== Vegetation ==
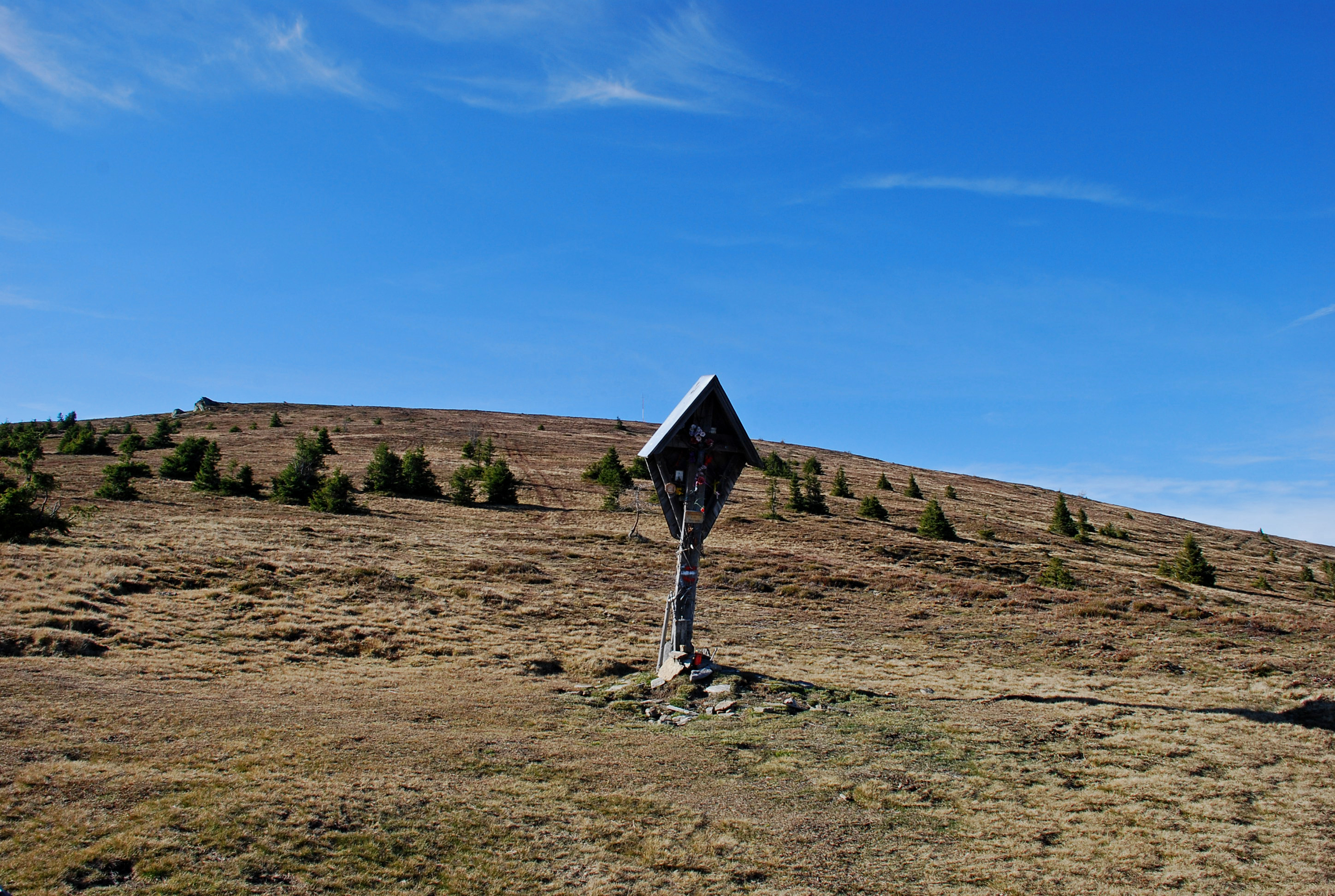
Handhöhenkreuz in front of the Handalm east slope

The vegetation belongs to the subalpine to alpine altitudinal zone. The Handalm is covered with spruce forest to the tree line, which is followed by a growth of mountain pines. The soil in the forest is covered with raw humus and, where the tree cover loosens, also with blackberry bushes, bristly grass, ferns, mosses, and clumps of alpine bushes. Hellebore plants are common because they are not grazed by castles due to their toxicity. The vegetation of the summit area consists of lichens and mosses, which cover the ground as a mat, while bristly grass pastures can be found in other areas, especially on the slopes.

== Development ==
The Handalm is accessible by hiking trails: it lies on the European long-distance hiking trail E6, the north–south hiking trail 05, the Styrian circular hiking track, the Carinthian circular hiking trail, and the Via Alpina (violet trail, stage A 18). Other regional hiking trails, such as the Koralm-Kristall-Trail and the Lavanttaler Höhenweg also lead across the Handalm. The only public road in its catchment area is the road across the Weinebene in the south. From there, the summit area of the Handalm can be reached by a partially steep hiking track in about 20–40 minutes, depending on the fitness level (approximately one kilometer and 200 meters in altitude). Until the 1940s, a road branching off at the Weinebene led over the southern slope of the Handalm, the location of the Handalm cross and the Posch-Alm in the direction of Osterwitz. At that time it was still navigable by all-terrain vehicles, but after that, it fell into disrepair and is only identifiable in remains. The hiking trail to the Handalmkreuz partly follows the path of this old road.

== Wolfstein ==
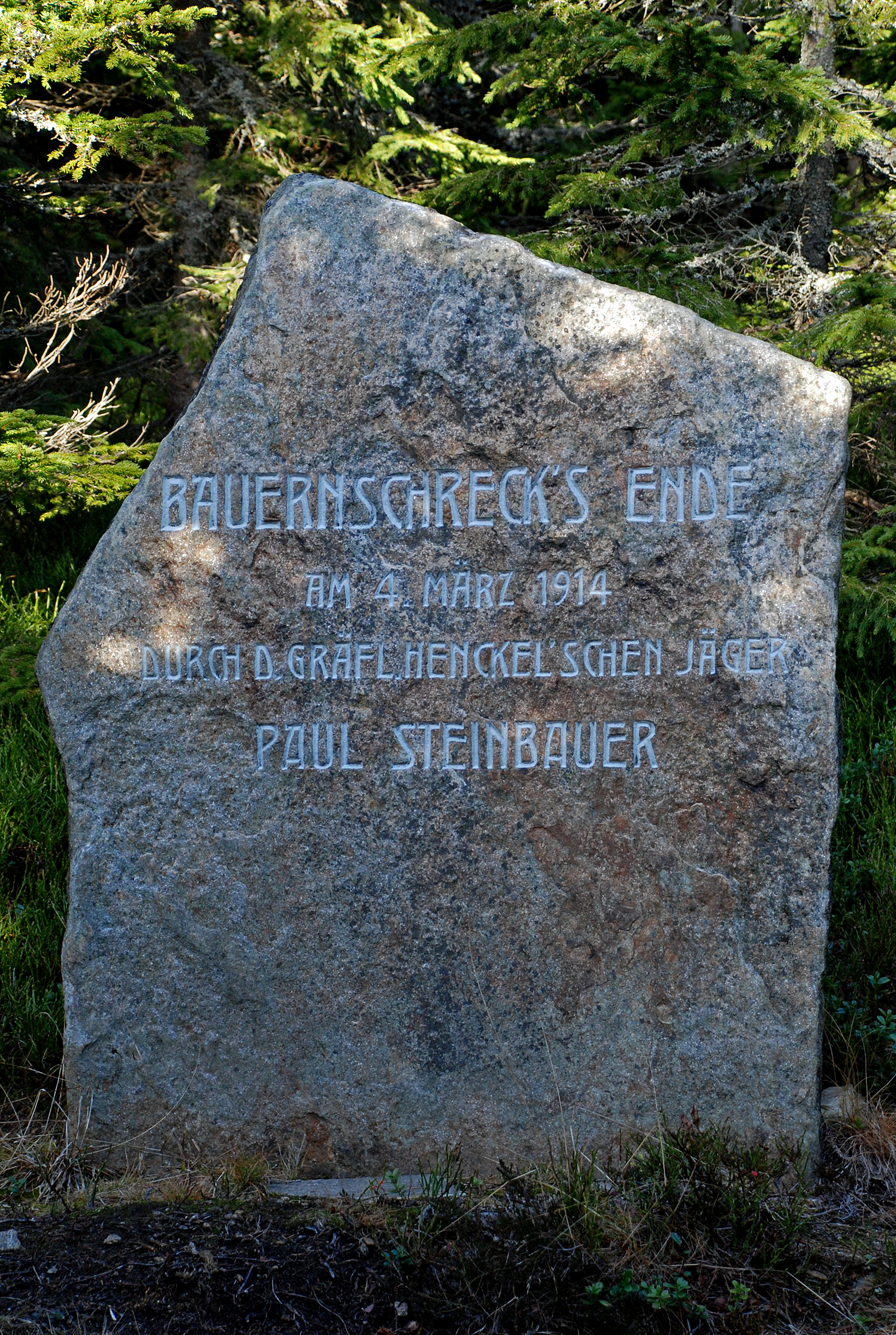
Wolfstein am Wildbachsattel, Handalm area

In the northwest of the Handalm range, at the Wildbach saddle, there is the Wolfstein. This is a memorial stone that commemorates the killing of a large wolf on March 5, 1914: in 1913, this animal had caused turmoil in the central Koralpen area, tearing numerous sheep, cattle, and other domestic animals and had become the subject of local myths. It was the last wolf in this area at that time and was called the "peasant's terror".

== Handalm wind farm ==
At the center of the plateau amidst the rock groups on Handalm stood a steel mast, serving as a meteorological station from 2012 to 2016. This mast is 50 meters high and was reinforced with steel cables on three sides. It formed a crucial component of the Handalm and Weinebene wind measurement system, which encompassed a total of three masts. The second mast was positioned at the Weinofen, south of Weinebene, while the third was built at the Weberkogel, northwest of Handalm. These monitoring stations played a vital role in the earlier stages of the Handalm wind farm project.

The Handalm is located in a priority zone for the use of wind energy, decided under the Styrian provincial government in the development program for wind energy (Sapro Windenergie) in June 2013. Three square kilometers are allocated along the approximately five-kilometer-long ridge from the Brandhöhe to the Kumpfkogel.

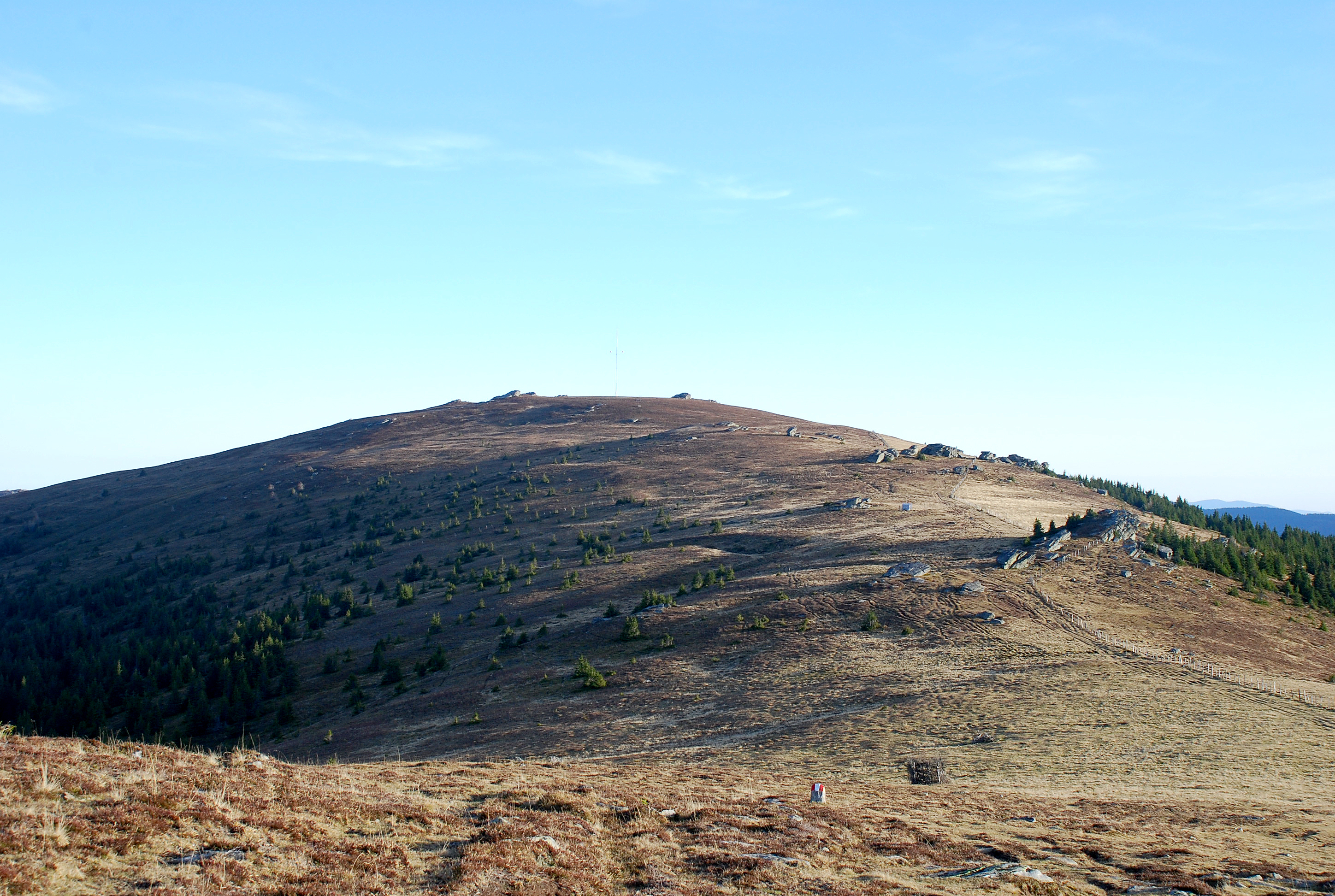
The Handalm from the northwest (Weberkogel)

Eleven turbines with 72,600 MWh per year were planned in this area as part of the NER300 program. The project was among the top-ranked projects for funding from the European Union in 2012.

The Handalm wind farm was added to the list of subsidized projects in December 2012 with a maximum amount of 11.3 million euros. It was discussed to use the energy generated from wind power to operate a pumped storage power plant in the near vicinity and thus make it storable.

After completion of the environmental impact assessment, which is currently the focus of an investigation into misuse of authority, in March 2016 the start of work on the wind farm was announced for summer 2016. The result was 13 wind turbines with a total capacity of 39 megawatts (MW), and the total amount of green electricity generated will be 76-gigawatt hours (GWh, million-kilowatt hours) per year, which is only (admittedly wind-dependent) about 6 GWh less than the amount of energy from the Mur power plant in Graz. The works on the wind farm lasted two years, for which 150 individual conditions were foreseen for the protection of wild animals, birds, bats, and the surrounding alpine pastures and forests. The area of the wind turbines is accessed by an extension of an existing forest road, which branches off the Weinebenstraße. As of October 2017, the wind turbines will provide electricity to more than 21,000 households. The rotor blades individually weigh 8 tons, a wind turbine has a diameter of 82 meters, and the turbines are each about 120 meters high. A foundation weighs about 1000 tons, a hub (at a height of 78 meters) about 19 tons and 58 million euros were invested in the plant. The wind turbine is connected to the Deutschlandsberg substation by a 17 km-long transmission line.

On October 24, 2017, the wind farm began operations. The 100th Styrian wind turbine operated in it, which was given the name "Renate", was sponsored by the ski racer Renate Götschl.

Wind farm in Handalm
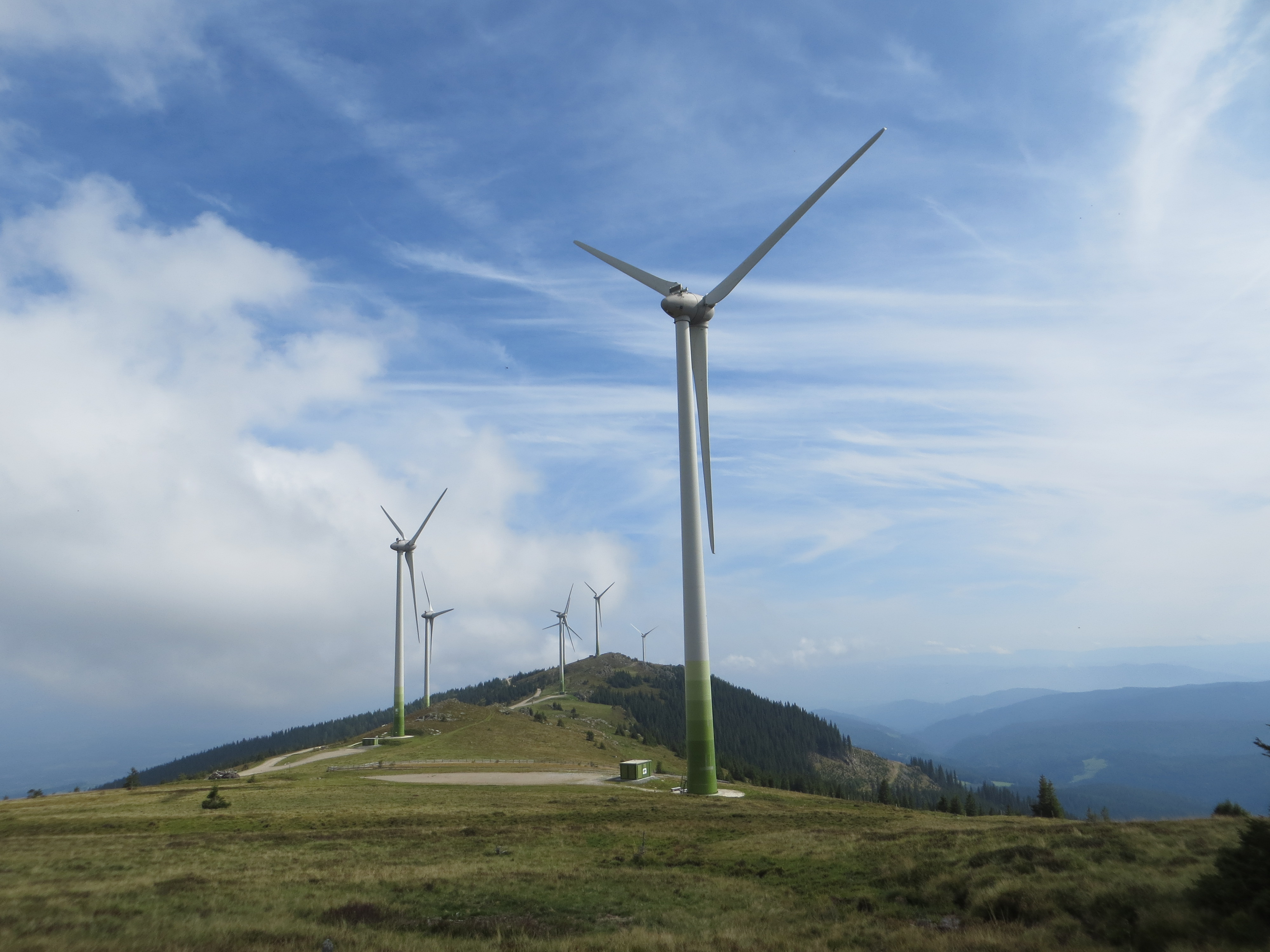
towards the southeast

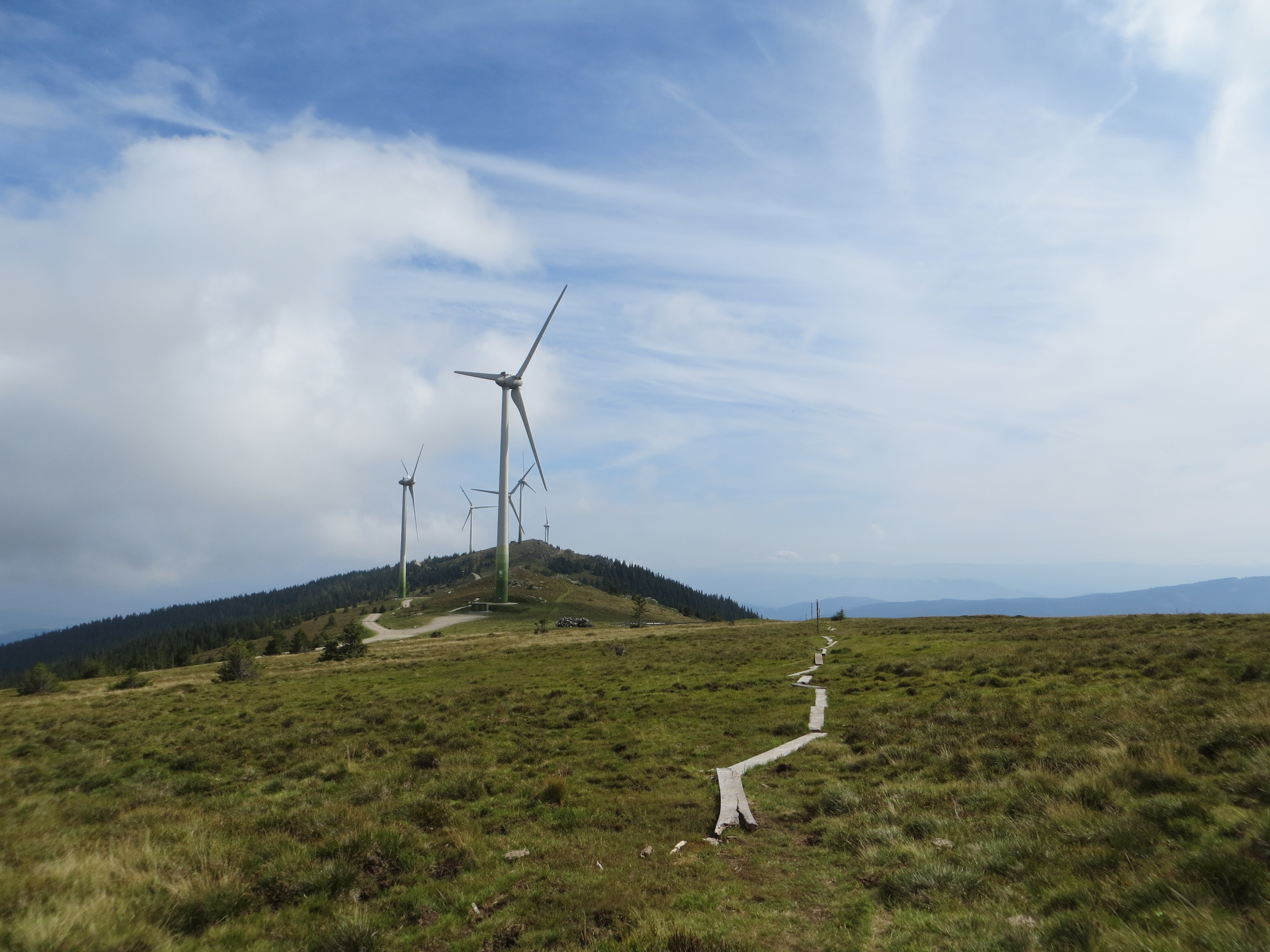

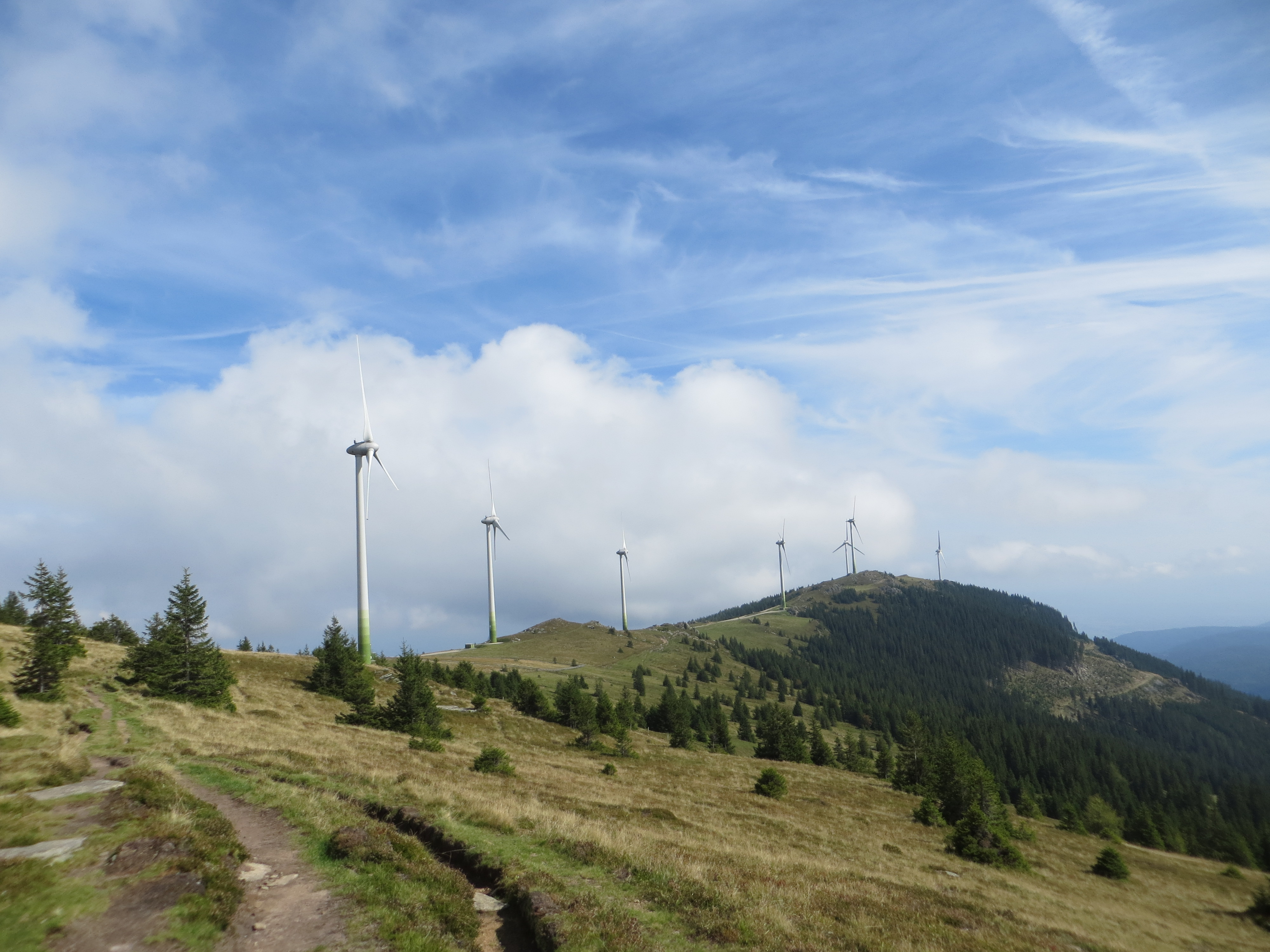

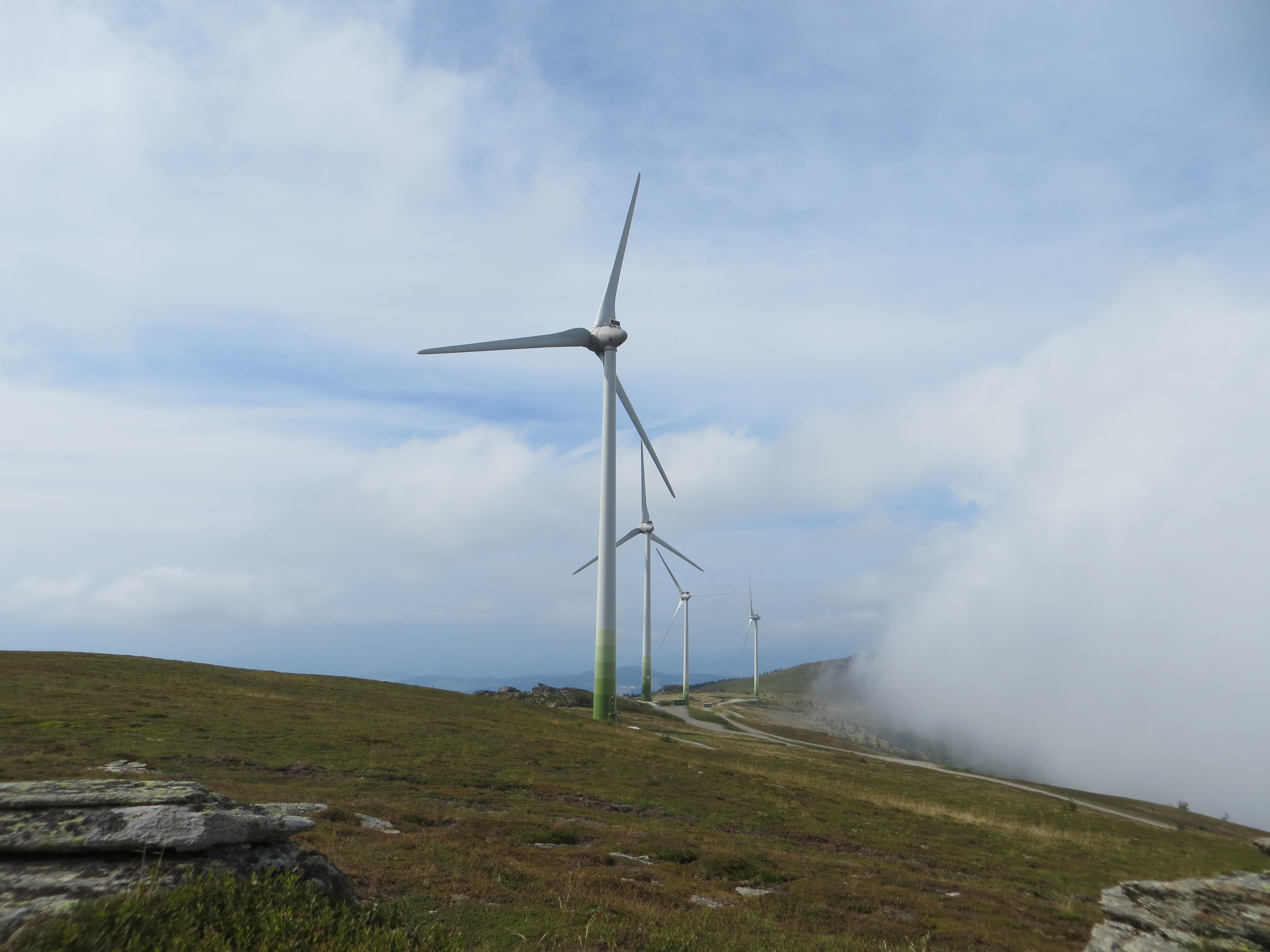
north from the summit

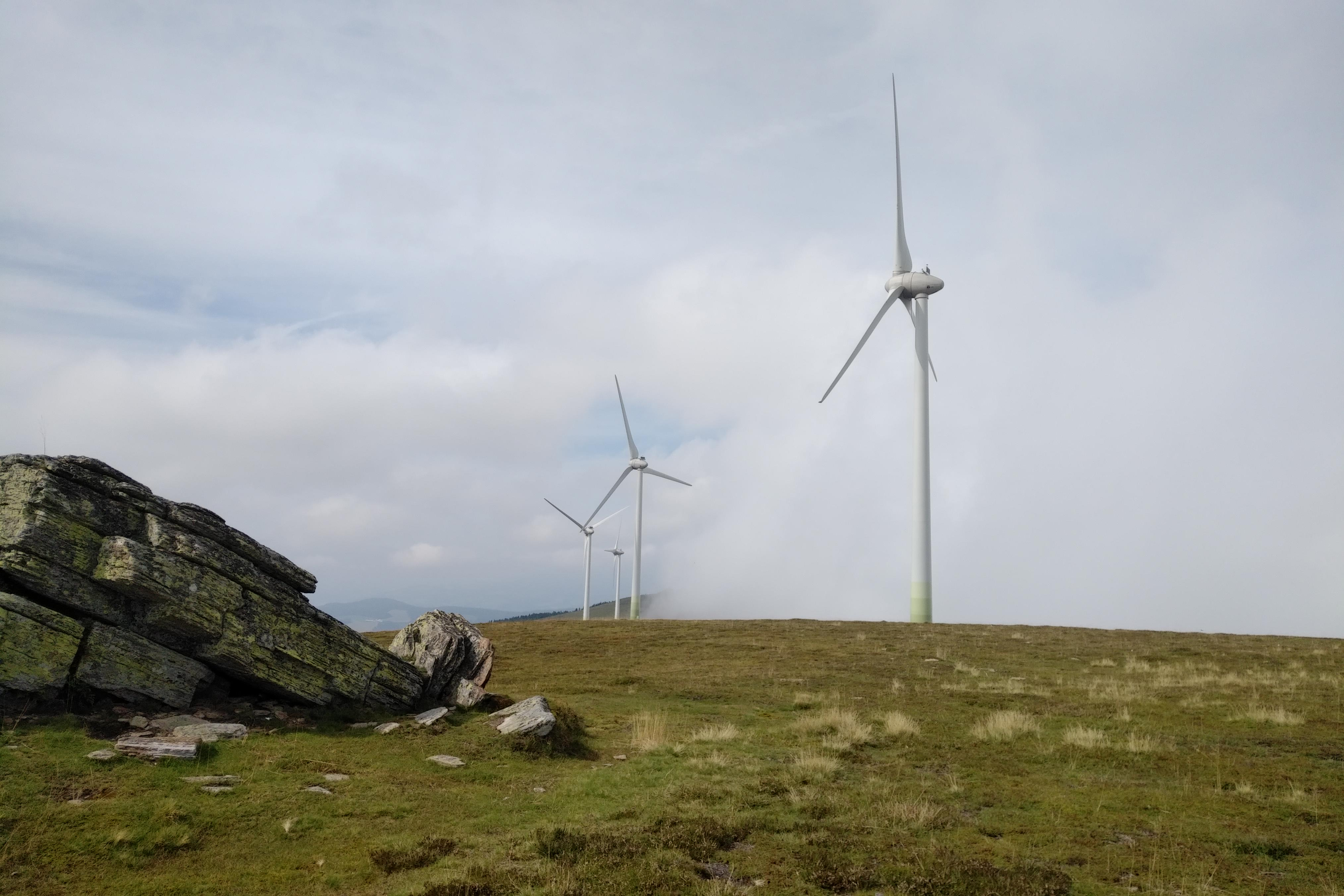

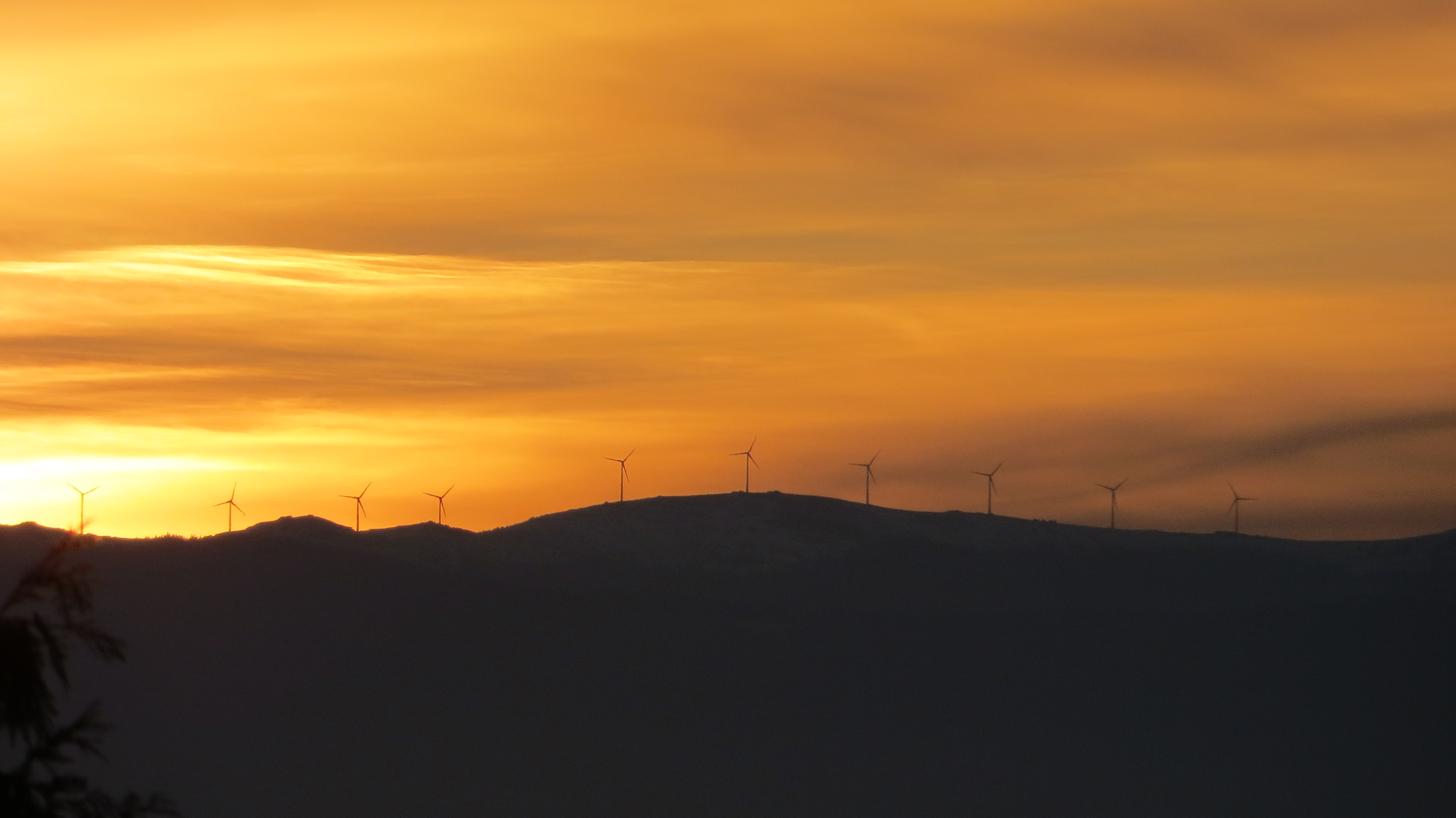
seen from Graz in the sunset

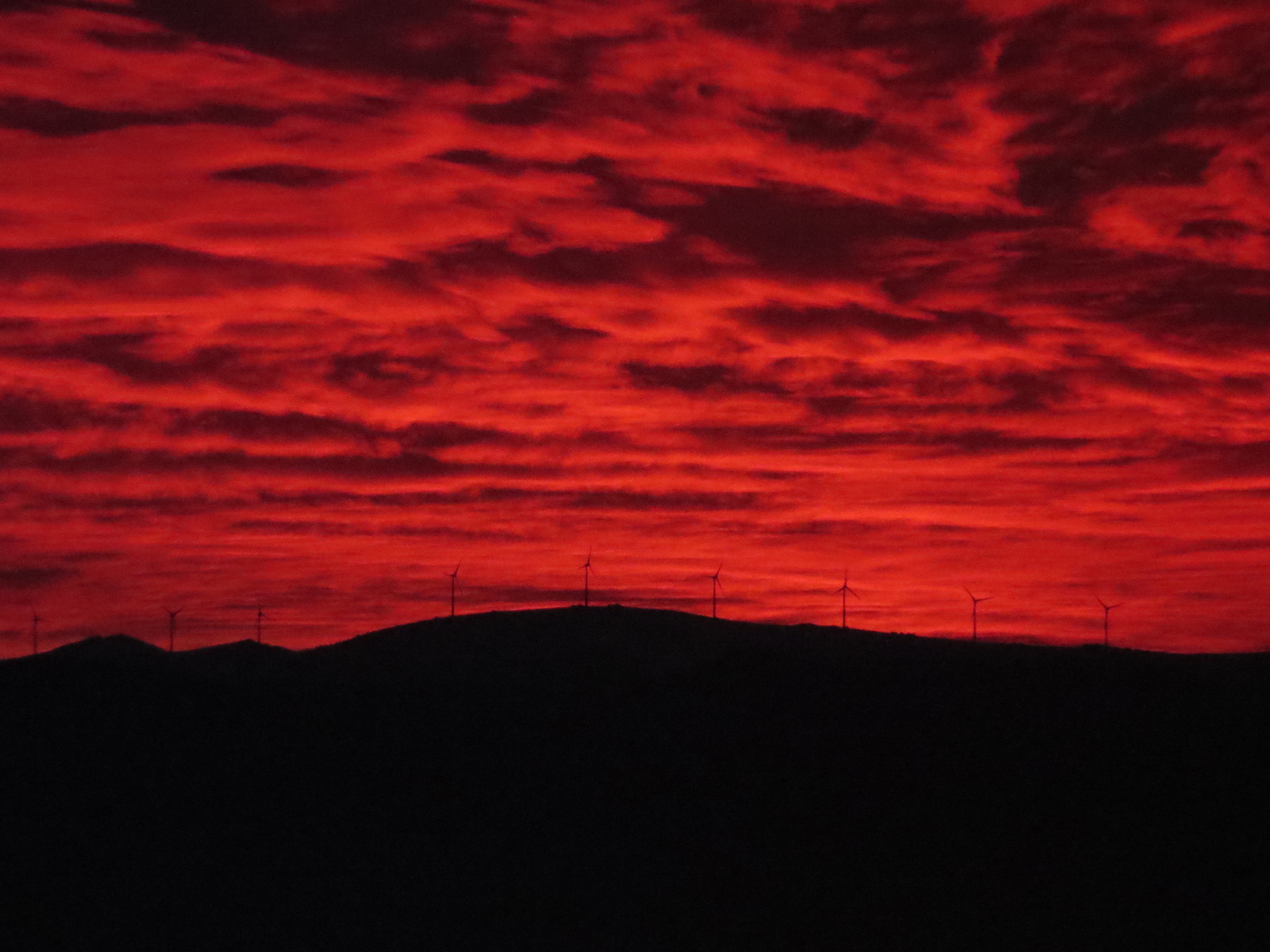
