= Koralpe =

Mountain range in southern Austria

Coordinates: 46.800°N 14.983°E

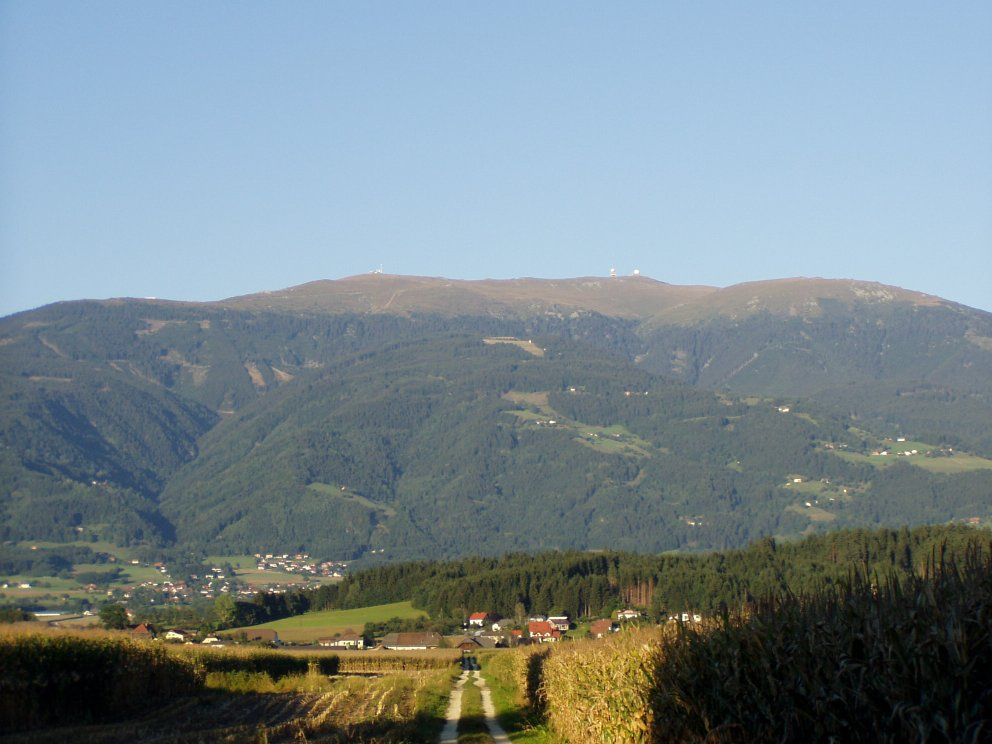
The central part of the Koralpe with the Große Speikkogel, as seen from the west

The Koralpe (English: Kor Alps, German: [ˈkoːɐ̯ˌalpə, ˈkoːʁˌalpə], Slovene: Golica or Gola planina), also referred to as Koralm (German: [ˈkoːɐ̯ˌalm, ˈkoːʁˌalm]), is a mountain range in southern Austria which separates eastern Carinthia from southern Styria. The southern parts of the range extend into Slovenia. Running from north to south, it drains to the river Lavant in the west, and to the river Sulm in the east. Its highest elevation (2,140 meters) is the Große Speikkogel, a popular hiking destination and also a node for military radar airspace surveillance. In the south, in the Slovenian territory, it is contiguous with the Kozjak mountain range.

The Koralpe consists mostly of metamorphic rock, of which some parts are of considerable interest to geologists and to collectors of semi-precious stones. In and around the Weinebene (also a popular recreational and hiking area) there are pegmatites which contain significant amounts of spodumene, making this area the largest known lithium deposit in Europe. Quartz and feldspar, together with the dense forests, provided the basis for a glass and porcelain industry in earlier times.

The Koralm Railway, opened in 2025 November, linking the provincial capitals of Klagenfurt and Graz via the Koralm Tunnel under the Koralpe.

== See also ==
- Handalm
