= Osterwitz =

- Former municipality
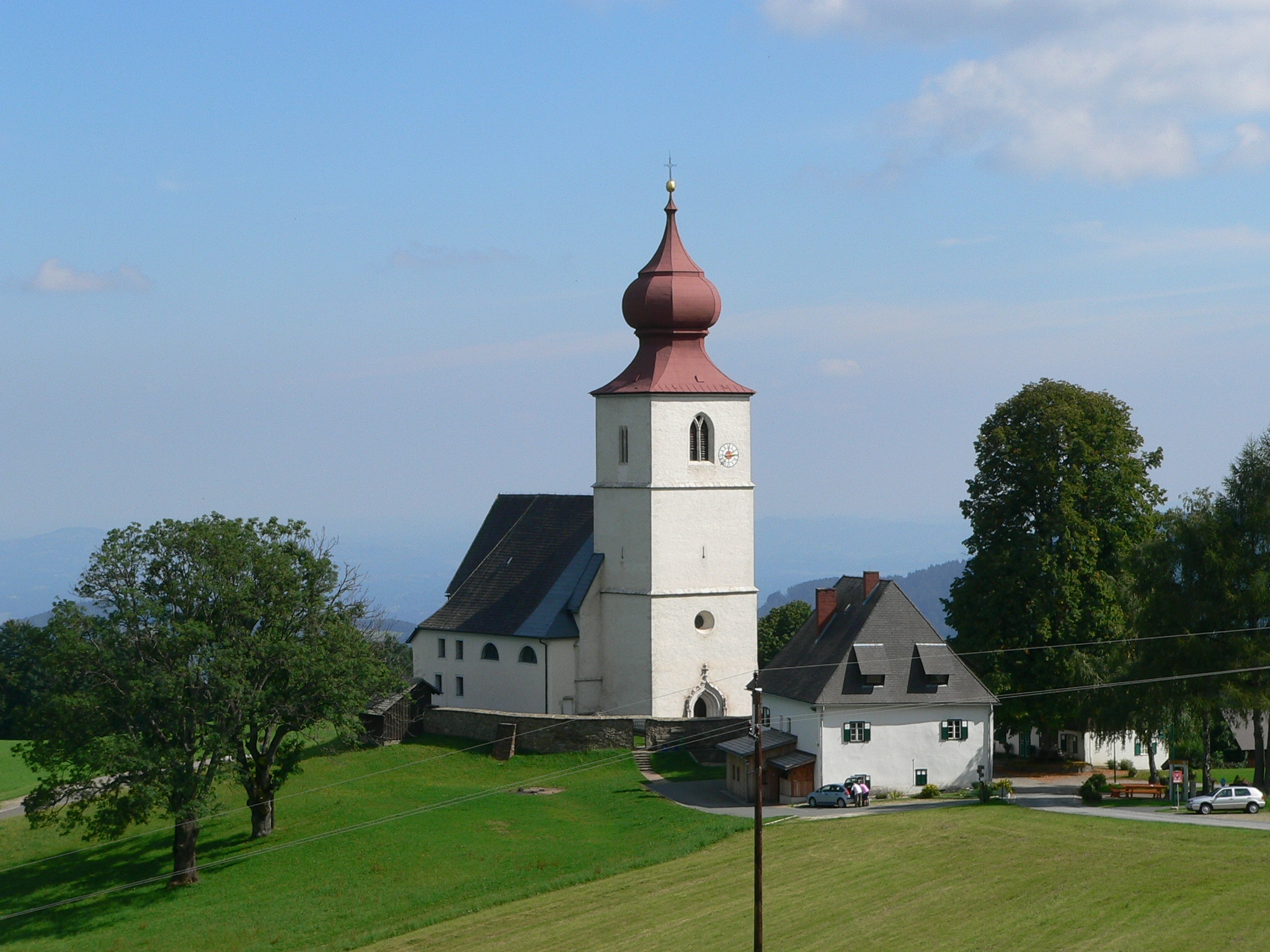

- Location within Austria
- Coordinates: 46°51′29″N 15°07′58″E
- Country: Austria
- State: Styria
- District: Deutschlandsberg

Area
  - Total: 45.36 km^{2} (17.51 sq mi)
- Elevation: 1,143 m (3,750 ft)

Population (2025)
  - Total: 128
  - Density: 2.82/km^{2} (7.31/sq mi)
- Time zone: UTC+1 (CET)
  - Summer (DST): UTC+2 (CEST)
- Postal code: 8530
- Area code: 03469
- Vehicle registration: DL
- Website: www.osterwitz.at

Osterwitz is a former municipality in the district of Deutschlandsberg in the Austrian state of Styria. Since the 2015 Styria municipal structural reform, it is part of the municipality Deutschlandsberg.

== Population ==
Historical population
Year	Pop.	±%
1770	460	—
1782	454	−1.3%
1812	321	−29.3%
1846	385	+19.9%
1869	470	+22.1%
1880	445	−5.3%
1890	420	−5.6%
1900	353	−16.0%
1910	322	−8.8%
1923	368	+14.3%
1934	336	−8.7%
1939	322	−4.2%
1951	340	+5.6%
1961	275	−19.1%
1971	190	−30.9%
1981	186	−2.1%
1991	192	+3.2%
2001	167	−13.0%
2011	156	−6.6%
2022	132	−15.4%
2025	128	−3.0%
