= Betnava Mansion =

Manor house in Slovenia

Coordinates: 46°31′42.55″N 15°38′22.93″E

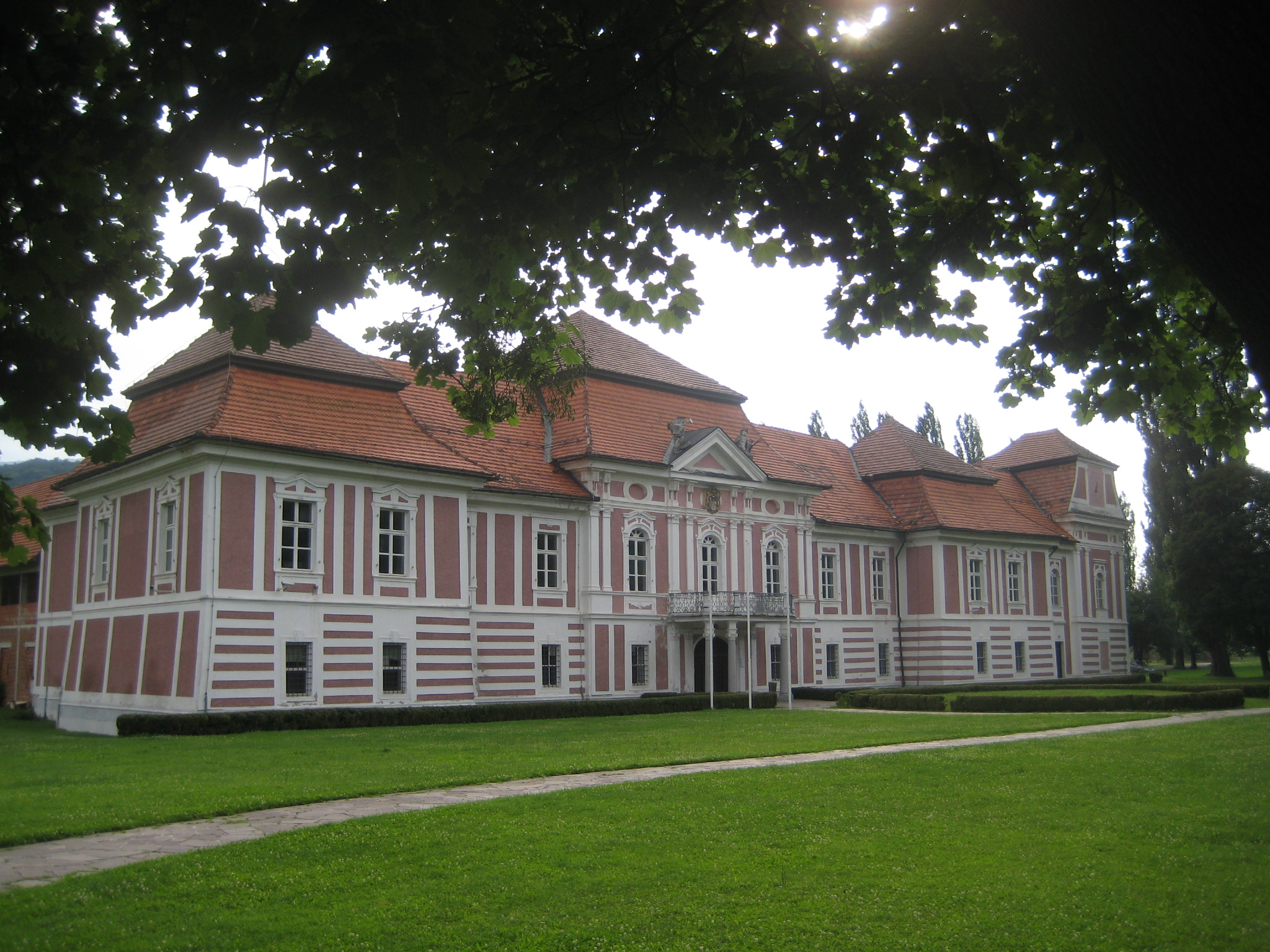

Betnava Mansion (Slovene: Dvorec Betnava, German: Schloss Windenau) is a manorhouse located near the city of Maribor in northern Slovenia.

A structure on the site is first mentioned in 1319, under the name Wintenaw. By the 16th century, it had grown into a fortified and moated renaissance manor.

It passed through the hands of numerous owners, including the noble families of Herberstein, Khiessl, Auersperg, Ursini-Rosenberg, Szekely, Brandis. During their tenure, the counts Herberstein transformed it into a Protestant way-station, complete with chapel and cemetery. In 1863, Betnava became the summer residence of the bishops of Maribor and Lavant, having already been leased by the see for several decades.

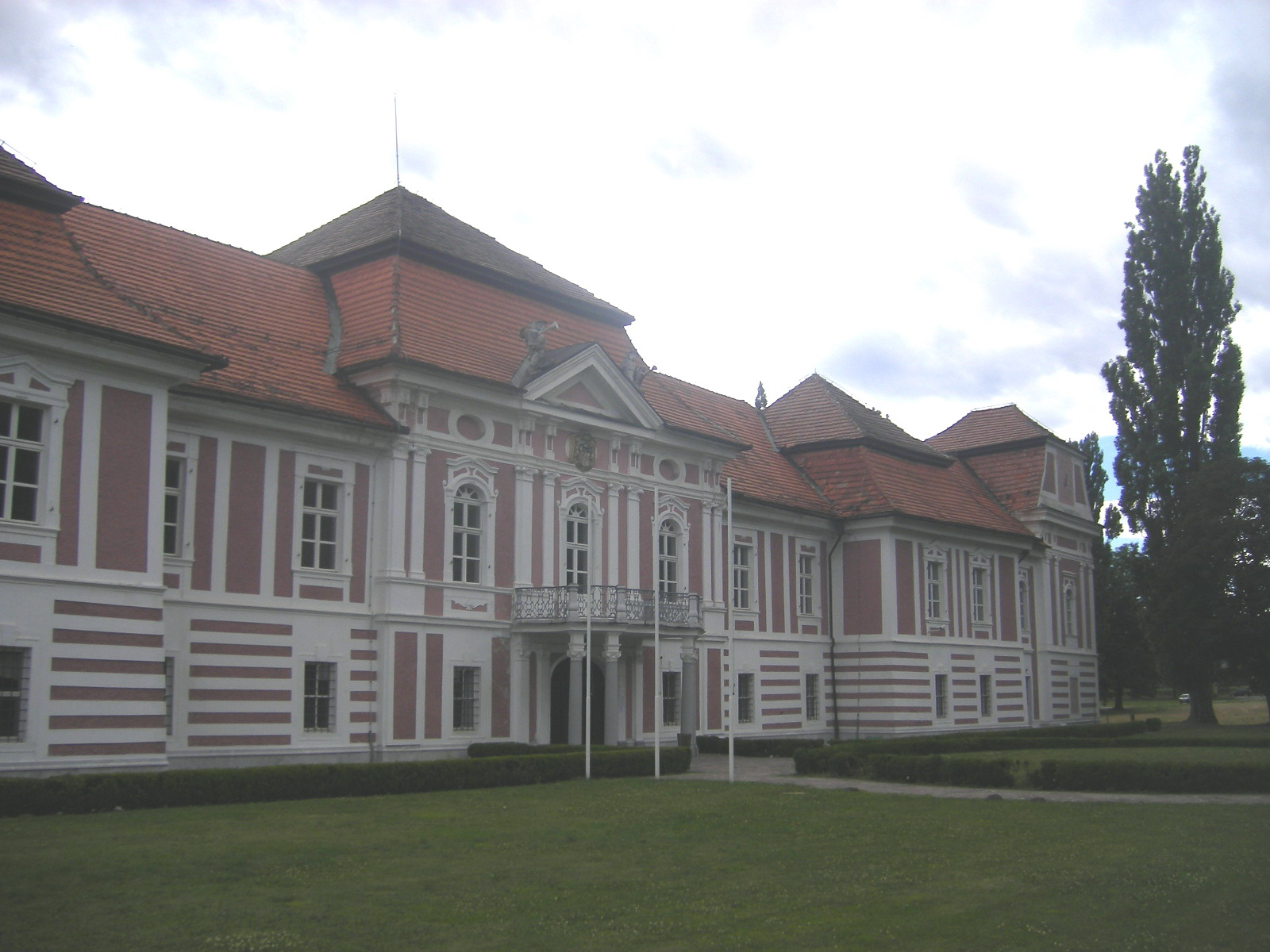
Dvorec Betnava

In 1784, the mansion was rebuilt in late-baroque Florentine style, after the fashion of Vienna at the time. The west wing contains a chapel dedicated to the Holy Cross, while other notable features include a carved staircase leading to the main hall, itself decorated with late-baroque trompe-l'œil ceiling frescoes painted by an unknown artist c. 1780.

The main facade faces a 19th-century English country park.

The mansion's current owner is the archbishopric of Maribor, which was in 2011 cited by the Agency for the Protection of Cultural Heritage for failure to properly maintain the site and safeguard structures uncovered in an archeological dig.

== Sources ==
- https://web.archive.org/web/20090218153632/http://betnava.org/ (unreachable, 3 Aug 2016)
- http://www.delo.si/clanek/141729 Delo, 25 Feb 2011
