= Auersperg =

Auersperg may refer to:

- House of Auersperg, an Austrian noble family

== Palaces ==
- Palais Auersperg (Graz), Austria
- Auersperg Palace (Prague), Czech Republic
- Palais Auersperg, Vienna, Austria

== People ==
- Herbard VIII von Auersperg (1528–1575), Habsburg general
- Andreas von Auersperg (1556–1593), Carniolan commander at the Battle of Sisak
- Johann Weikhard of Auersperg (1615–1677), chief privy councillor and first Prince of Auersperg
- Johann Ferdinand of Auersperg (1655–1705), second Prince of Auersperg
- Franz Karl of Auersperg (1660–1713), third Prince of Auersperg
- Heinrich Joseph Johann of Auersperg (1697–1783), fourth Prince of Auersperg
- Joseph Franz Auersperg (1734–1795), Austrian cardinal and Prince-Bishop of Passau
- Count Anton Alexander von Auersperg (1806–1876), Austrian poet and politician
- Prince Karl of Auersperg (1814–1890), minister-president of Cisleithania and eighth Prince of Auersperg
- Prince Adolf of Auersperg (1821–1885), minister-president of Cisleithania
- Prince Karl Maria Alexander of Auersperg (1859–1927), Austrian statesman and ninth Prince of Auersperg
- Fernanda Auersperg (born 1971), Uruguayan politician
- Alice Auersperg (born 1981), Austrian cognitive biologist

== See also ==
- Turjak Castle, 13th-century castle in Slovenia known in German as Burg Auersperg
