= Herberstein =

Herberstein may refer to:

- Schloss Herberstein, a castle in Styria, Austria
- Siegersdorf bei Herberstein, a municipality in the district of Hartberg in Styria, Austria
- Sankt Johann bei Herberstein, a municipality in the district of Hartberg in Styria, Austria
- Sigismund von Herberstein (1486–1566), Carniolan diplomat, writer and historian
- Ernest Johann Nepomuk Graf Herberstein (1731–1788), the first bishop of the diocese of Linz from 1785 to 1788
