= Kaibing =

- Former municipality
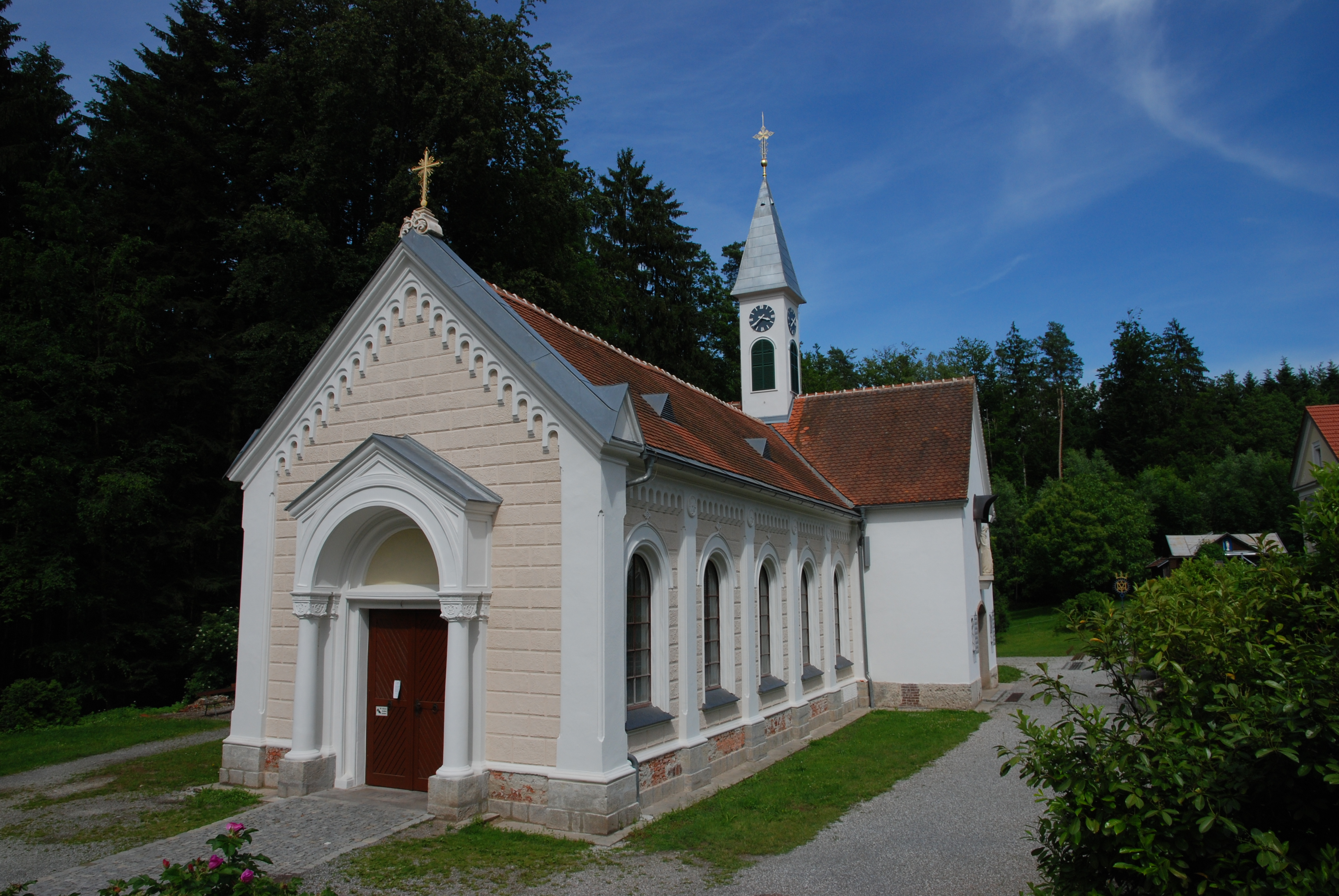
- Maria Fieberbründl pilgrimage site (part of Kaibing)

- Coat of arms

- Location within Austria
- Coordinates: 47°11′51″N 15°50′19″E
- Country: Austria
- State: Styria
- District: Hartberg-Fürstenfeld

Area
  - Total: 2.80 km^{2} (1.08 sq mi)
- Elevation: 360 m (1,180 ft)

Population (1 January 2016)
  - Total: 392
  - Density: 140/km^{2} (363/sq mi)
- Time zone: UTC+1 (CET)
  - Summer (DST): UTC+2 (CEST)
- Postal code: 8221, 8222
- Area code: 0 31 13
- Vehicle registration: HB
- Website: www.kaibing.steiermark.at

Kaibing is a former municipality in the district of Hartberg-Fürstenfeld in Styria, Austria. Since 2015, it is part of the municipality Feistritztal.
