= Feistritztal =

Municipality in Styria, Austria

- Municipality
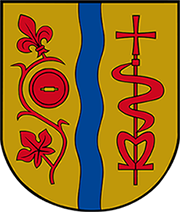
- Coat of arms

- Location within Austria
- Coordinates: 47°11′35″N 15°49′42″E
- Country: Austria
- State: Styria
- District: Hartberg-Fürstenfeld

Government
  - Mayor: Friedrich Wachmann (ÖVP)

Area
  - Total: 25.73 km^{2} (9.93 sq mi)

Population (2018-01-01)
  - Total: 2,417
  - Density: 93.94/km^{2} (243.3/sq mi)
- Time zone: UTC+1 (CET)
  - Summer (DST): UTC+2 (CEST)
- Postal code: 8221, 8222, 8223, 8224, 8265
- Website: www.feistritztal.at

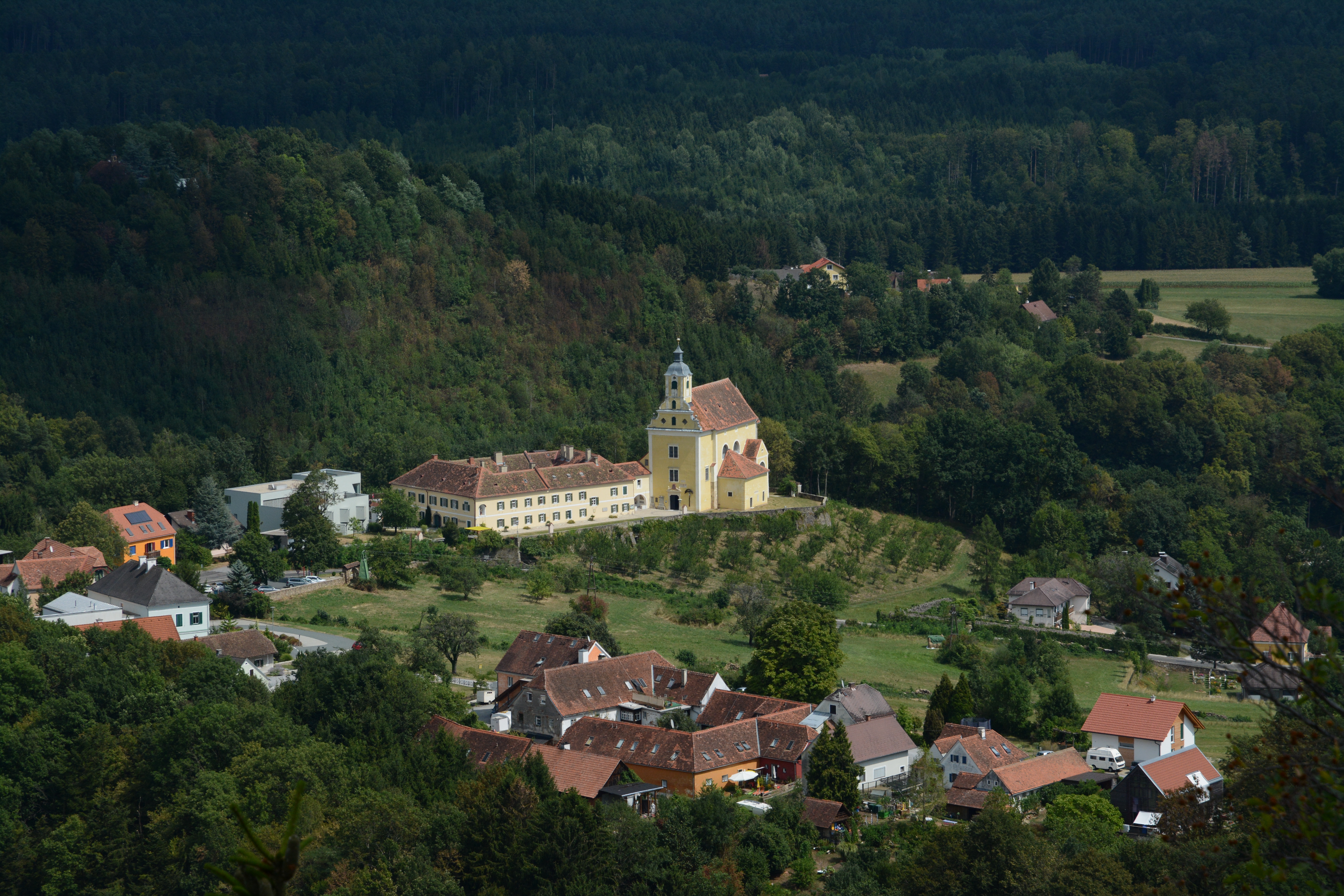
View of St. Johann bei Herberstein with the Pfarrkirche hl. Johannes der Täufer

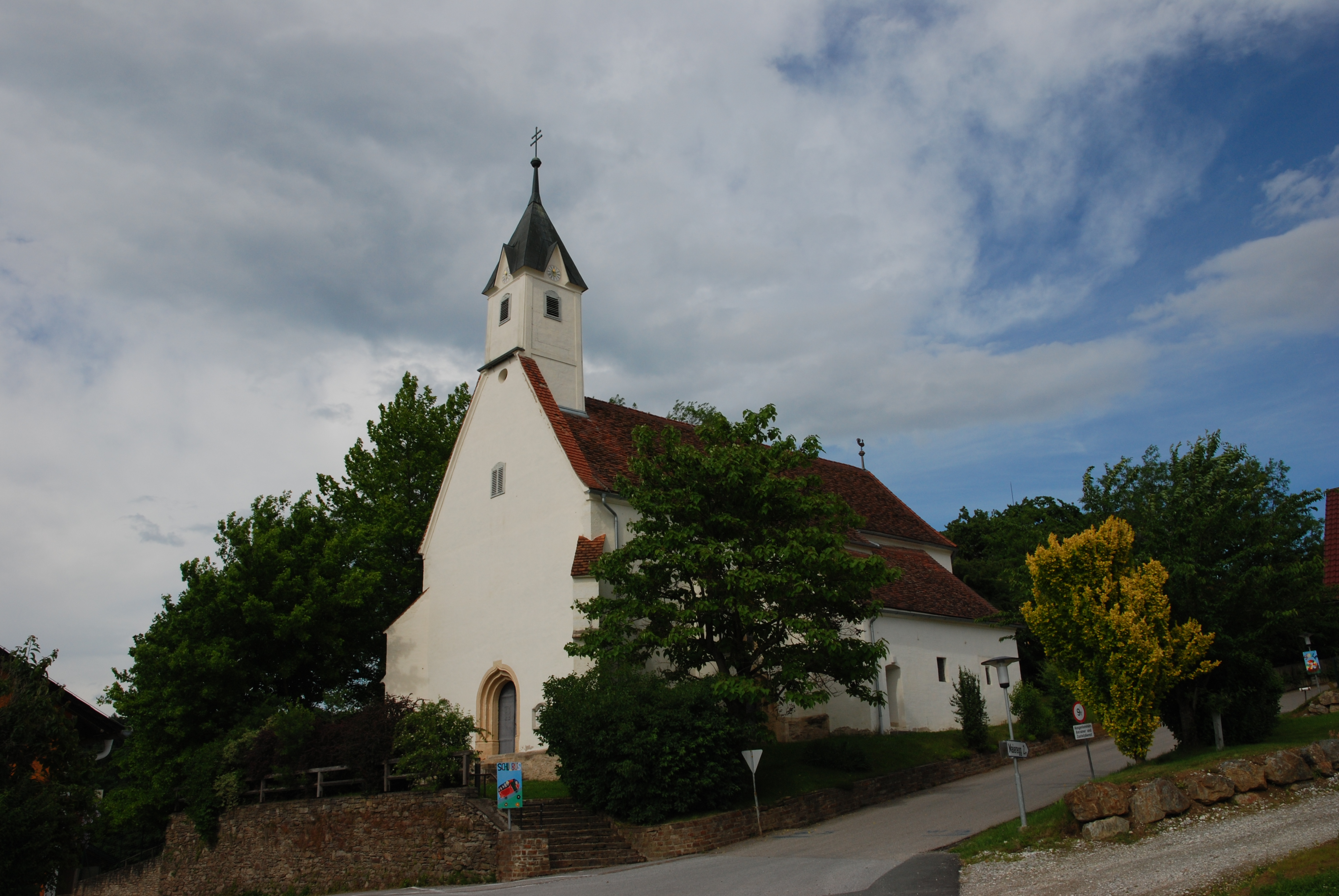
Filialkirche hll. Rochus und Sebastian in Blaindorf

Feistritztal is a municipality in Hartberg-Fürstenfeld District in Styria, Austria

The municipality was founded as part of the Styria municipal structural reform, on 31 December 2014, from the dissolved independent municipalities Blaindorf, Kaibing, Sankt Johann bei Herberstein and Siegersdorf bei Herberstein (all in political District Hartberg-Fürstenfeld), plus Hirnsdorf (in political Weiz District).

The border of the Hartberg-Fürstenfeld District and Weiz District was altered so that the new municipality lies completely in Hartberg-Fürstenfeld District.

== Municipality arrangement ==
The municipal territory includes the following seven sections (populations as of 2015):

- Blaindorf (305)
- Hirnsdorf (673)
- Hofing (128)
- Illensdorf (230)
- Kaibing (391)
- Sankt Johann bei Herberstein (387)
- Siegersdorf bei Herberstein (293)

The municipality consists of 7 Katastralgemeinden (areas 2015):

- Blaindorf (520.61 ha or 1,286.5 acres)
- Hirnsdorf (456.78 ha)
- Hofing (535.21 ha)
- Kaibing (280.58 ha or 693.3 acres)
- St. Johann bei Herberstein (282.11 ha)
- Siegersdorf (494.73 ha or 1,222.5 acres)

== Municipal council ==
The council has 15 members and convened with the following parties

- 9 ÖVP
- 4 SPÖ
- 2 FPÖ

The last election had the following results:

Partei	2015			2010														
Partei	Feistritztal			Blaindorf			Hirnsdorf			Kaibing			St. Johann			Siegersdorf		
Partei	Stim.	%	Mand.	St.	%	M.	St.	%	M.	St.	%	M.	St.	%	M.	St.	%	M.
ÖVP	961	57	9	218	45	4	267	52	5	198	71	7	146	60	6	148	72	7
SPÖ	422	25	4	229	47	5	227	44	4	80	28	2	46	19	1	57	28	2
FPÖ	207	12	2	39	8	0	21	4	0	nicht kandidiert			nicht kandidiert			nicht kandidiert		
Die Grünen	85	5	0	nicht kandidiert			nicht kandidiert			nicht kandidiert			53	22	2	nicht kandidiert		
Wahlberechtigte	2.054			552			593			311			287			249		
Wahlbeteiligung	82%			89%			89%			91%			88%			84%		

== Tourism ==
The town along with Anger, Floing, Puch bei Weiz and Stubenberg has the tourism group "Apfelland Stubenbergsee", Whose seat is in Stubenberg.

== Culture and sights ==
- Pfarrkirche Sankt Johann bei Herberstein in Sankt Johann bei Herberstein
- Filialkirche Maria Fieberbründl
