= Blaindorf =

- Former municipality
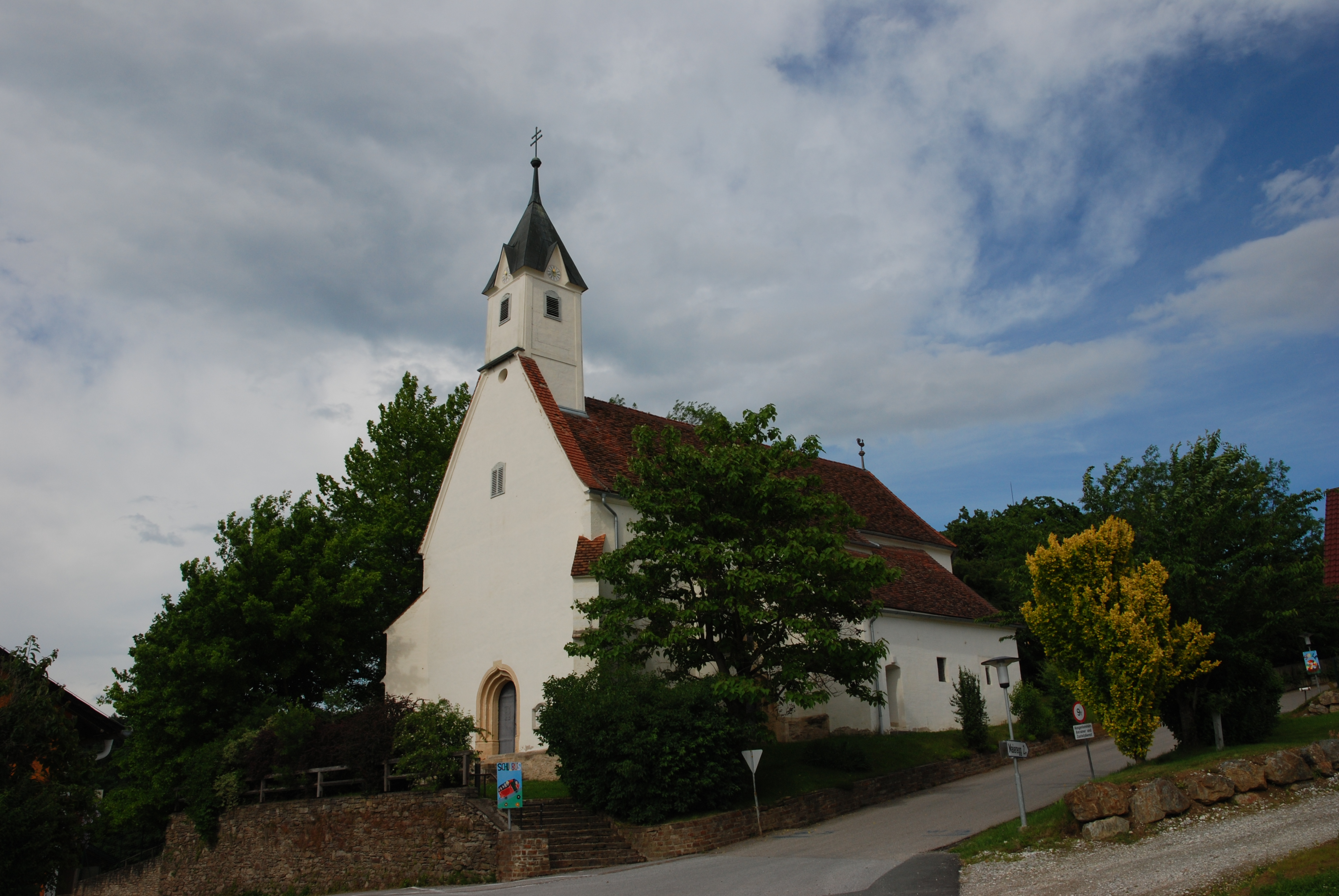
- Church in Blaindorf

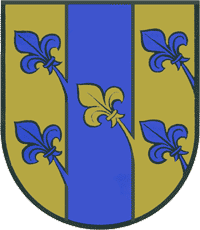
- Coat of arms

- Location within Austria
- Coordinates: 47°10′32″N 15°51′58″E
- Country: Austria
- State: Styria
- District: Hartberg-Fürstenfeld

Area
  - Total: 10.55 km^{2} (4.07 sq mi)
- Elevation: 358 m (1,175 ft)

Population (1 January 2016)
  - Total: 668
  - Density: 63.3/km^{2} (164/sq mi)
- Time zone: UTC+1 (CET)
  - Summer (DST): UTC+2 (CEST)
- Postal code: 8265, 8221, 8222, 8224
- Area code: 03386
- Vehicle registration: HB
- Website: www.blaindorf.at

Blaindorf is a former municipality in the district of Hartberg-Fürstenfeld in Styria, Austria. Since 2015, it is part of the municipality Feistritztal.
