= Palais Auersperg (Graz) =

Historic building in Graz, Austria

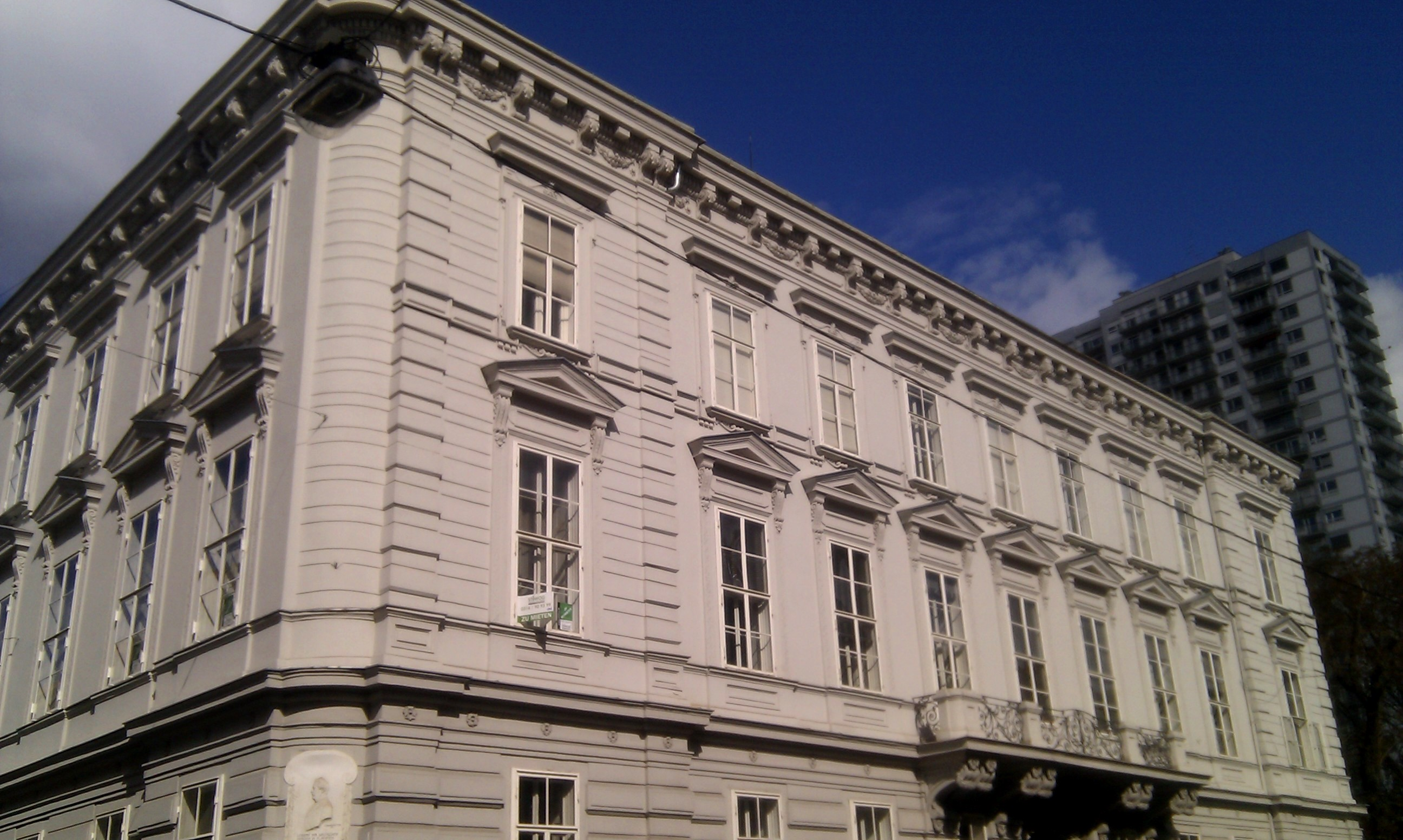
- Perspective view showing the corner of Elisabethstraße and Brandhofgasse
- Interactive map of the Palais Auersperg area

General information
- Architectural style: Neo-Renaissance
- Classification: Protected Monument (HERIS-ID: 98310)
- Location: Graz, Elisabethstraße 5 / Brandhofgasse 9
- Coordinates: 47°4′26″N 15°26′53″E
- Construction started: 1864
- Completed: 1865
- Client: Anton Alexander von Auersperg

Design and construction
- Architect: Johann Schöbl

The Palais Auersperg is a protected residential building in the Geidorf district of Graz, Austria. Located at the intersection of Elisabethstraße and Brandhofgasse, the building was built between 1864 and 1865 for the Austrian politician and poet Anton Alexander von Auersperg, who used the pseudonym Anastasius Grün.

== History ==
The building was constructed by the Graz builder Jakob Bullmann from plans by the architect Johann Schöbl. It was designed as a two-storey Mietpalais (a tenement palace with rental apartments) and was Auersperg's winter residence. He had moved to Graz after leaving Vienna due to political censorship under the Metternich administration before 1848.

After Auersperg died in 1876, his 17-year-old son Theodor inherited the building under the guardianship of Baron Otto von Abfaltrern, who owned the adjacent Palais Abfaltrern at Brandhofgasse 5. After Theodor died in a riding accident in 1881, the property passed to Anton Alexander's nephew, Erwin, Count of Auersperg.

Baron von Abfaltrern later bought the property and hired the builder Johann de Colle to add a third storey between 1883 and 1884. This extension was integrated symmetrically to match the original structure.

== Architecture ==
The building is a regional example of Strict Historicism (Strenghistorismus) and has two symmetrical Neo-Renaissance facades.

=== Exterior ===
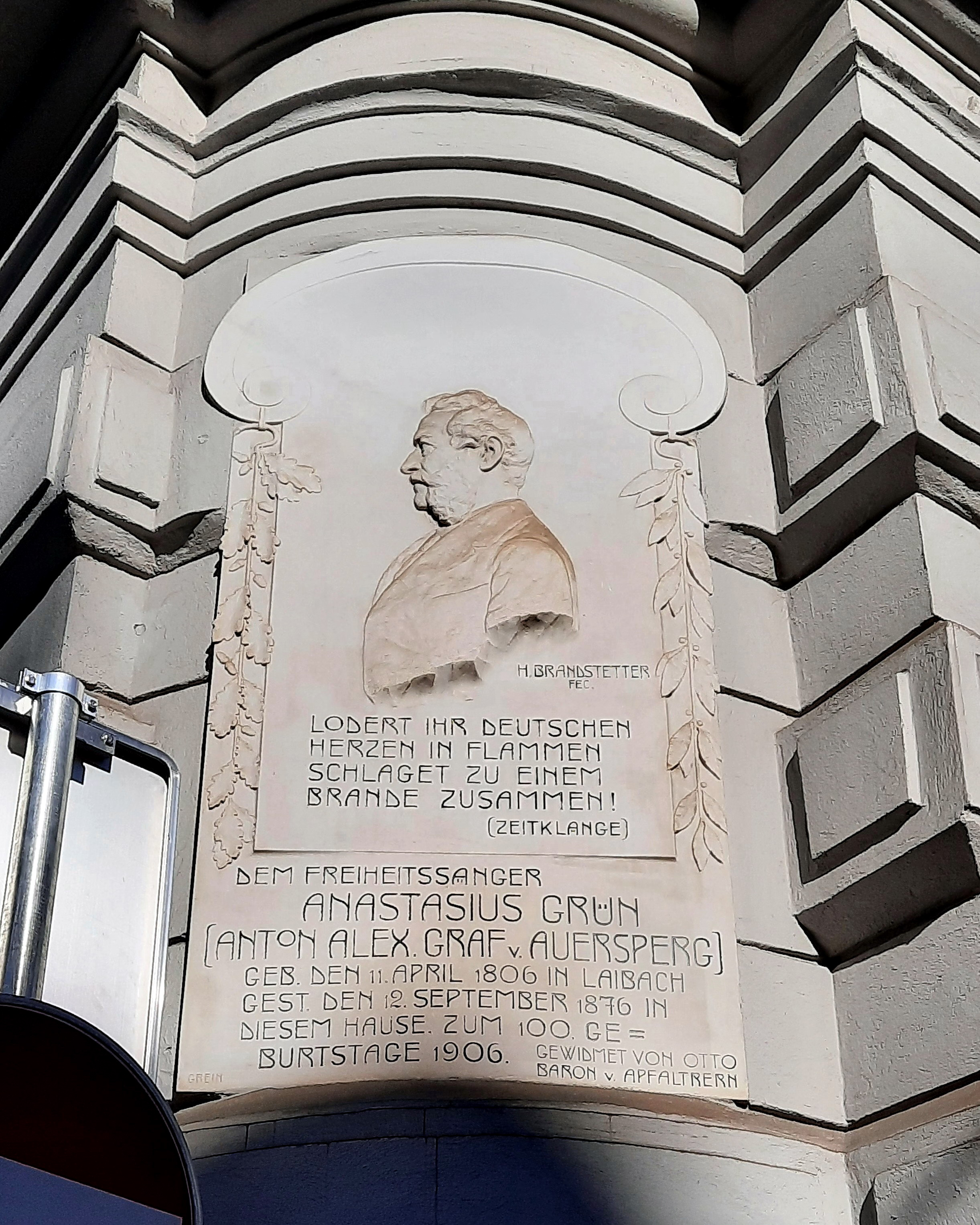
The 1906 marble memorial plaque of Anastasius Grün by Hans Brandstetter.

The main facade on Elisabethstraße has nine axes with two single-axis side risalits. The first-floor windows (piano nobile or Beletage) have triangular gables, while the third-floor windows have straight cornices. The original main cornice (Kranzgesims) was moved to the top of the new third floor during the 1883 expansion. The ground floor has a rusticated stone facade with small rectangular windows.

The round-arched entrance on Elisabethstraße has its original wooden double doors decorated with carved grotesque masks (maskerons). Above the entrance is a stone alliance coat of arms of the Auersperg and Attems families with a count's crown. A central three-axis balcony projects from the first floor, supported by four double brackets and enclosed by a wrought-iron railing.

The side facade on Brandhofgasse is eight axes wide and matches the details of the main facade, but has no entrance or balcony. On the corner connecting the two streets, Baron von Abfaltrern installed a marble memorial plaque with a relief portrait of Anastasius Grün in 1906 to mark the centenary of the poet's birth.

=== Interior ===
The main entrance leads into a vestibule with cross-vaulted ceilings. The interior features a three-flight staircase with cast-iron railings made by the Graz craftsman J. Heider during the original construction. The interior layout has since been altered for modern offices and apartments.

=== Courtyard and outbuildings ===
The property encloses an inner courtyard with historicist arcades that are now enclosed with glass. A single-storey outbuilding in the courtyard originally served as stables and carriage houses (Remisen). This structure was altered between 1879 and 1880.

== Gallery ==
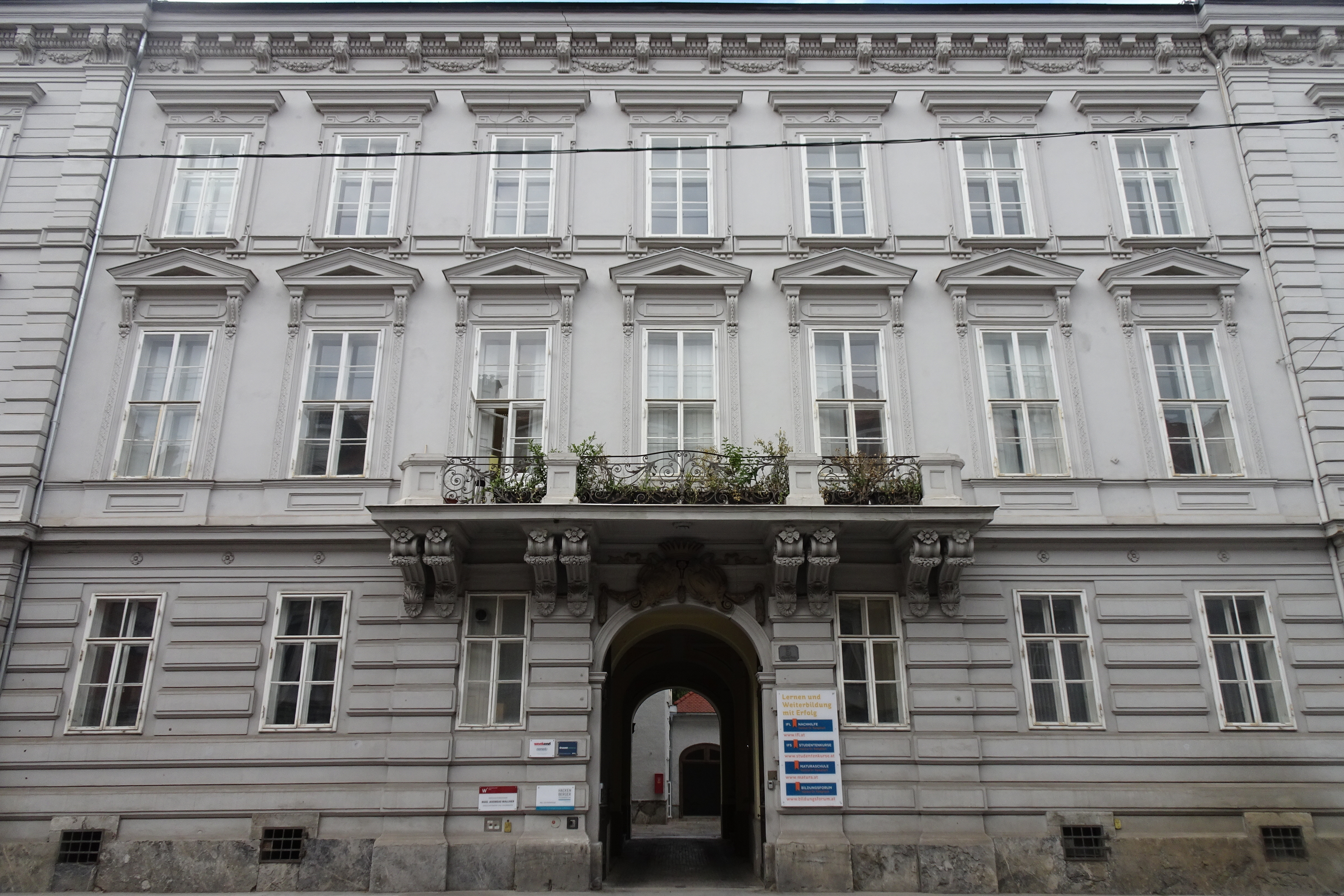
The main Neo-Renaissance facade on Elisabethstraße

== See also ==
- Palais Auersperg (The Baroque palace in Vienna)
