= Hirnsdorf =

- Former municipality
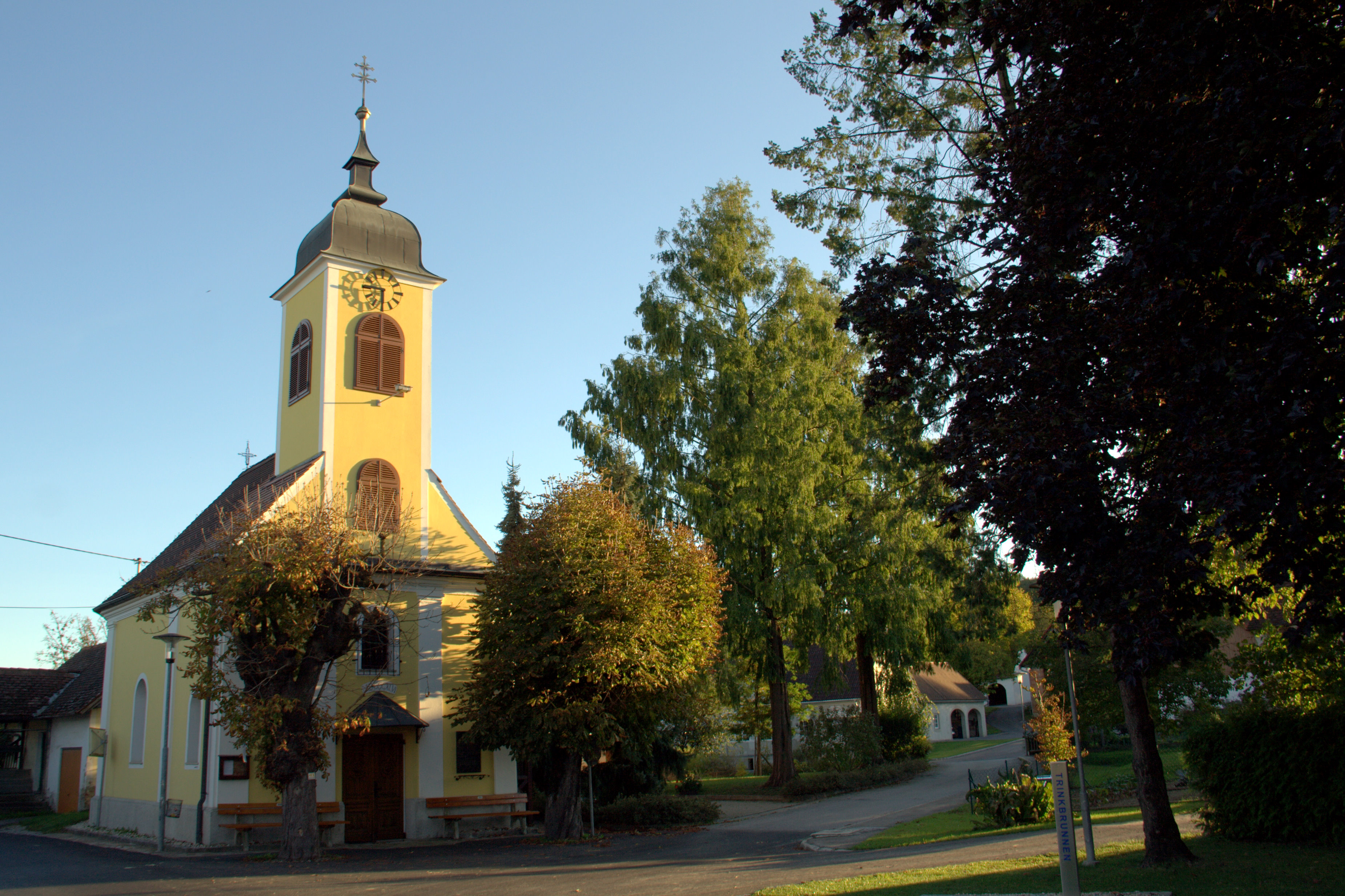
- Chapel in Hirnsdorf

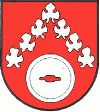
- Coat of arms

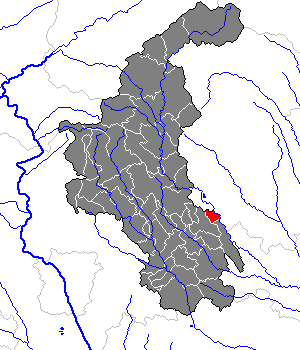
- Location within Weiz district

- Location within Austria
- Coordinates: 47°12′00″N 15°49′00″E
- Country: Austria
- State: Styria
- District: Weiz

Area
  - Total: 4.53 km^{2} (1.75 sq mi)
- Elevation: 358 m (1,175 ft)

Population (1 January 2016)
  - Total: 677
  - Density: 149/km^{2} (387/sq mi)
- Time zone: UTC+1 (CET)
  - Summer (DST): UTC+2 (CEST)
- Postal code: 8221
- Area code: 03113
- Vehicle registration: WZ
- Website: www.hirnsdorf. steiermark.at

Hirnsdorf is a former municipality in the district of Weiz in the Austrian state of Styria. Since 2015, it is part of the municipality Feistritztal, in the Hartberg-Fürstenfeld District.
