= Siegersdorf bei Herberstein =

- Former municipality
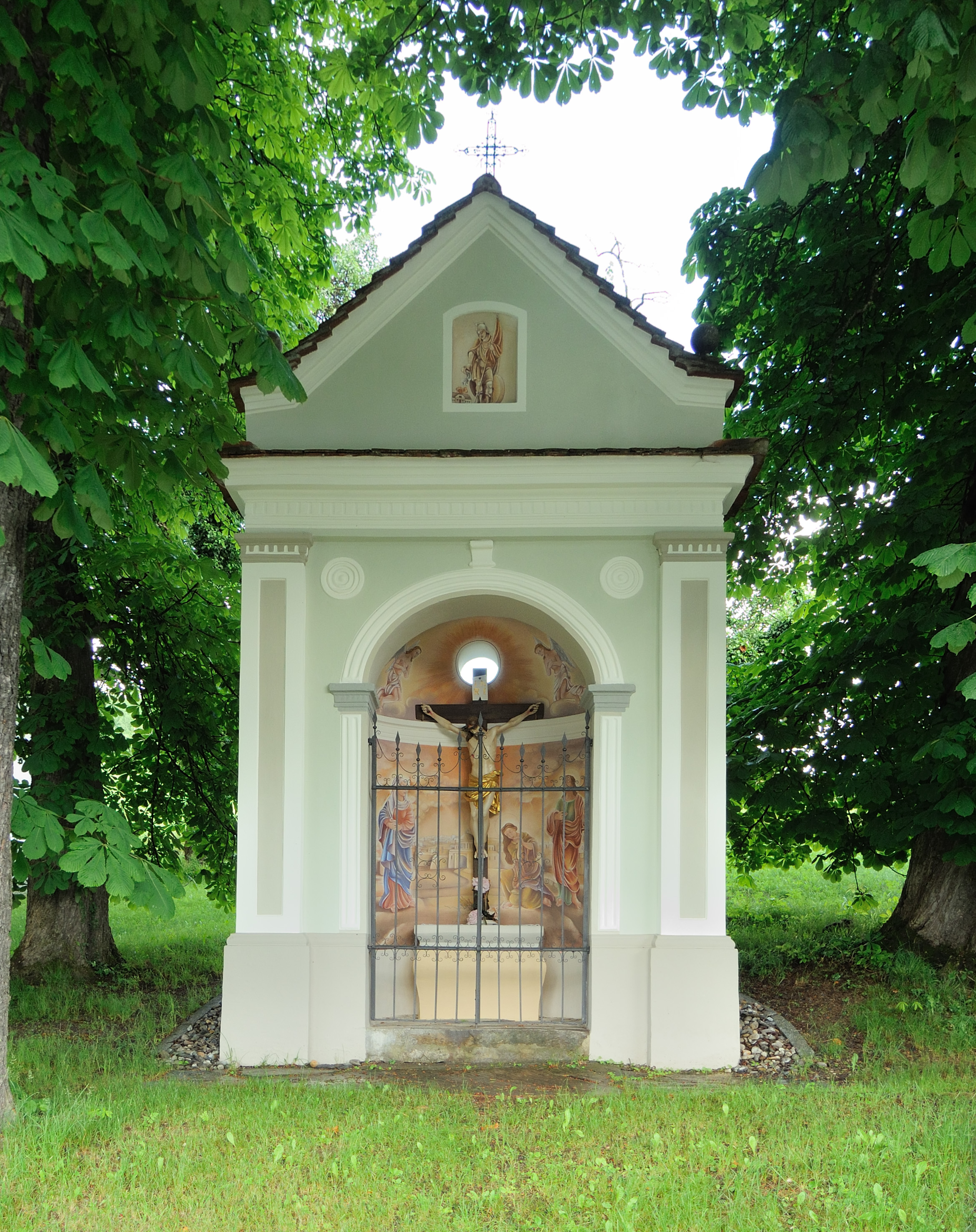
- Chapel "Neuhold-Kreuz" in Siegersdorf

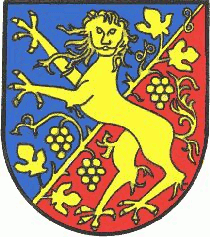
- Coat of arms

- Location within Austria
- Coordinates: 47°12′55″N 15°46′54″E
- Country: Austria
- State: Styria
- District: Hartberg-Fürstenfeld

Area
  - Total: 4.97 km^{2} (1.92 sq mi)
- Elevation: 560 m (1,840 ft)

Population (1 January 2016)
  - Total: 287
  - Density: 57.7/km^{2} (150/sq mi)
- Time zone: UTC+1 (CET)
  - Summer (DST): UTC+2 (CEST)
- Postal code: 8222
- Area code: 03113
- Vehicle registration: HB
- Website: www.siegersdorf-herberstein.at

Siegersdorf bei Herberstein is a former municipality in the district of Hartberg-Fürstenfeld in Styria, Austria. Since 2015, it is part of the municipality Feistritztal.
