= Sankt Johann bei Herberstein =

- Former municipality
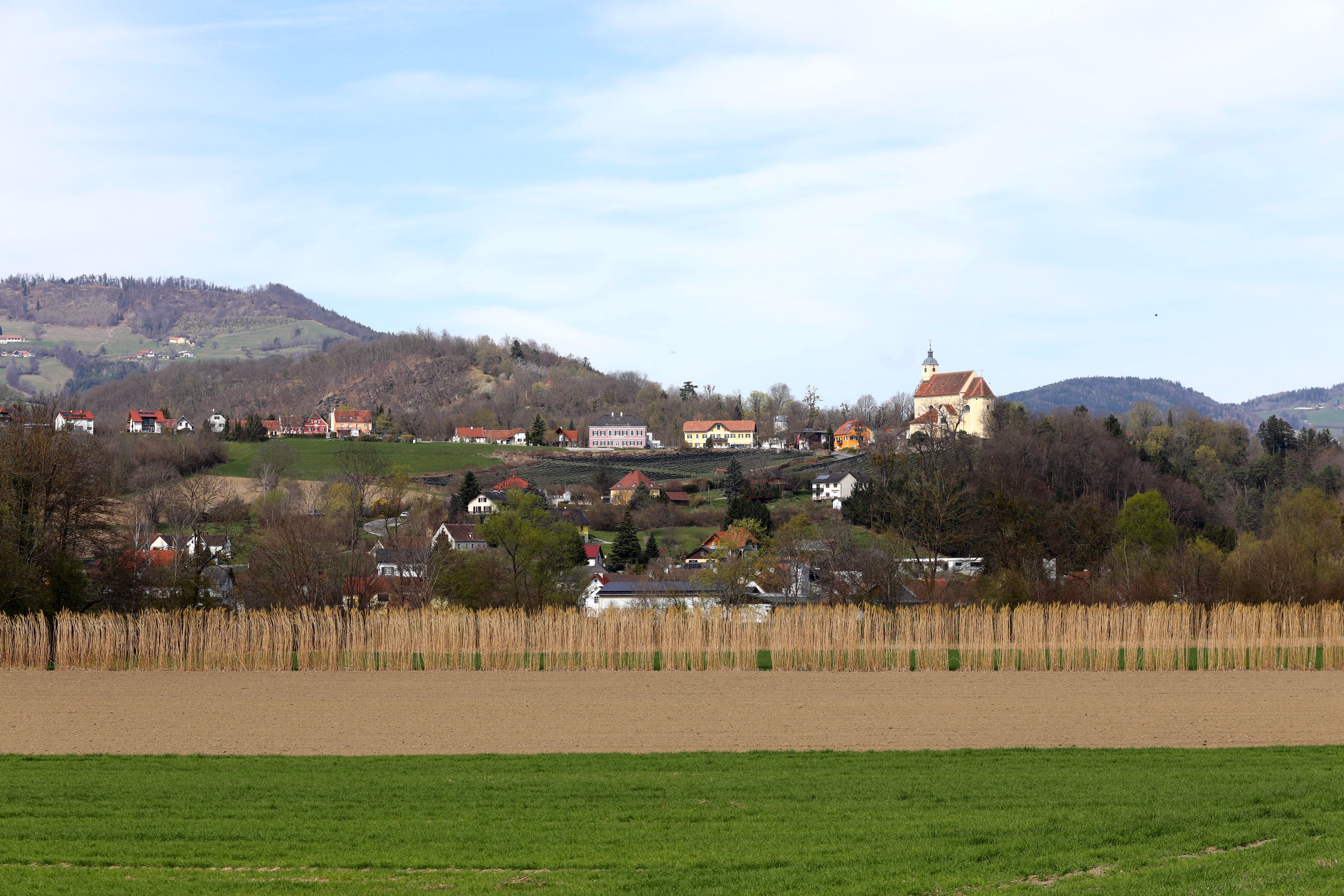

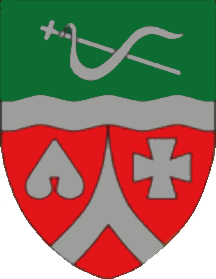
- Coat of arms

- Location within Austria
- Coordinates: 47°12′39″N 15°49′25″E
- Country: Austria
- State: Styria
- District: Hartberg-Fürstenfeld

Area
  - Total: 2.85 km^{2} (1.10 sq mi)
- Elevation: 421 m (1,381 ft)

Population (1 January 2016)
  - Total: 380
  - Density: 130/km^{2} (350/sq mi)
- Time zone: UTC+1 (CET)
  - Summer (DST): UTC+2 (CEST)
- Postal code: 8222
- Area code: 03113
- Vehicle registration: HB
- Website: www.st-johann-herberstein. steiermark.at

Sankt Johann bei Herberstein is a former municipality in the district of Hartberg-Fürstenfeld in Styria, Austria. It has 355 inhabitants (as of January 1, 2011). Since 2015, it is part of the municipality Feistritztal.

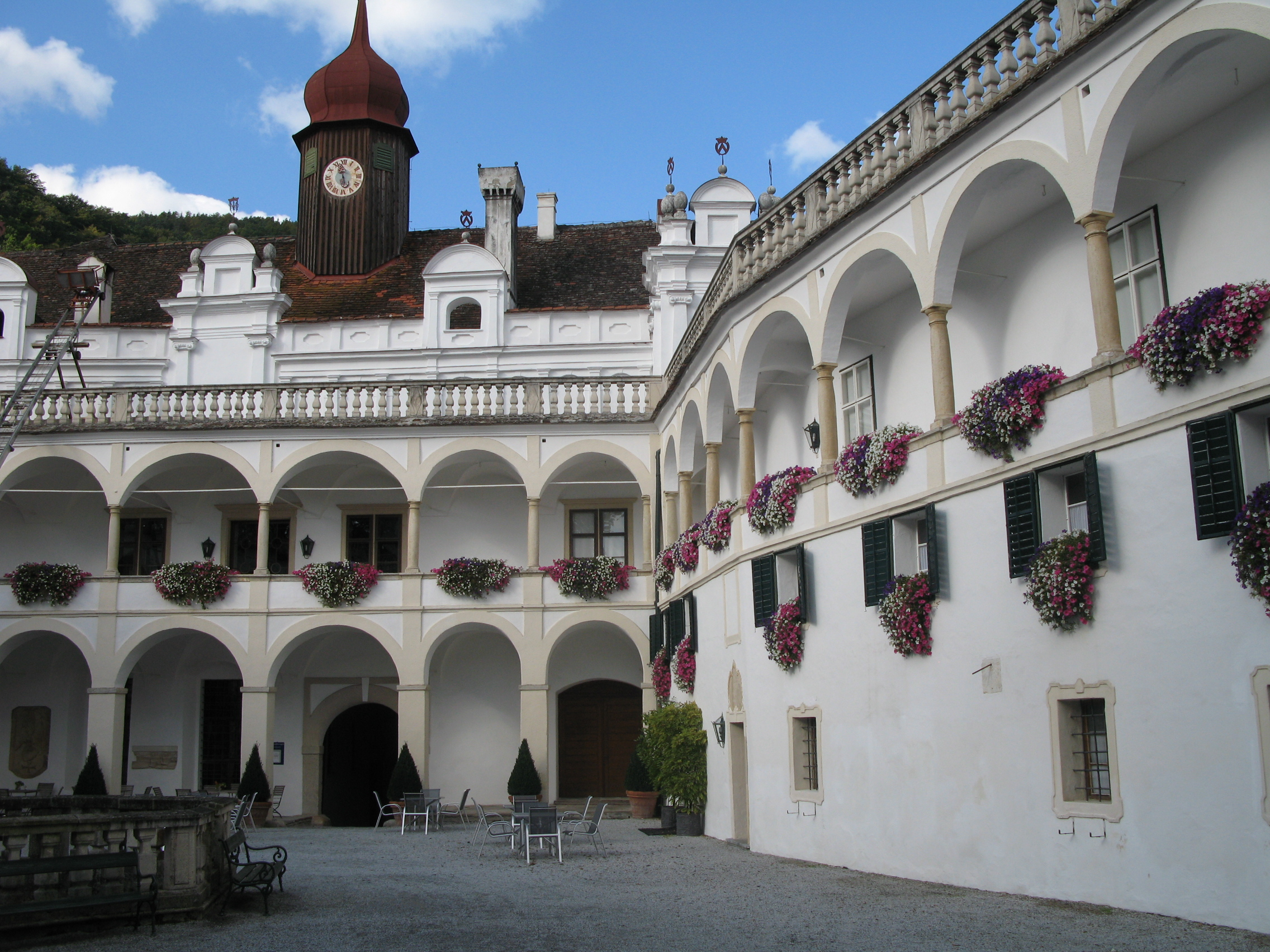
Schloss Herberstein, Buchberg 1
