= Palais Auersperg =

Baroque palace in Josefstadt, Vienna, Austria

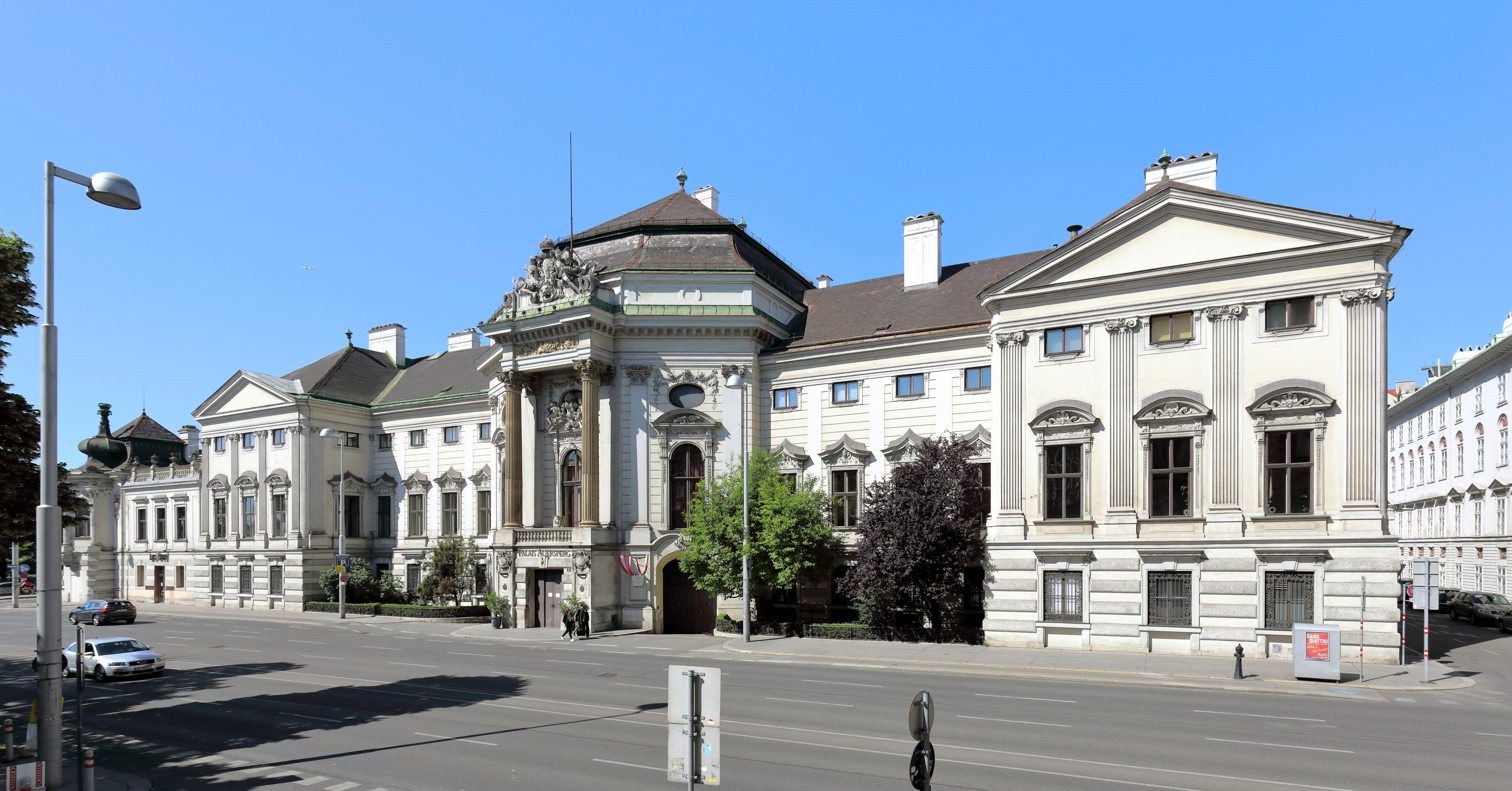
- Palais Auersperg in 2017

- Location within Austria
- Former names: Palais Rosenkavalier

General information
- Architectural style: Baroque
- Location: Josefstadt, Vienna, Austria, Auerspergstraße 1
- Coordinates: 48°12′31″N 16°21′15″E
- Year built: 1706-1710
- Renovated: 1720-1723 (addition); 1864 (ballroom); 1872 (ballroom)

Design and construction
- Architects: Johann Bernhard Fischer von Erlach and Johann Lukas von Hildebrandt

Renovating team
- Architect: Johann Christian Neupauer

Palais Auersperg, for a short time called Palais Rosenkavalier, is a Baroque palace at Auerspergstraße 1 in the Josefstadt or eighth district of Vienna, Austria.

== History ==
Palais Auersperg was built between 1706 and 1710 on the plot of the former Rottenhof according to the plans of two well-known architects, Johann Bernhard Fischer von Erlach and Johann Lukas von Hildebrandt, for Hieronymus Capece de Rofrano, to whom the former name Rosenkavalier refers. The middle section of the palace was altered between 1720 and 1723 by Johann Christian Neupauer.

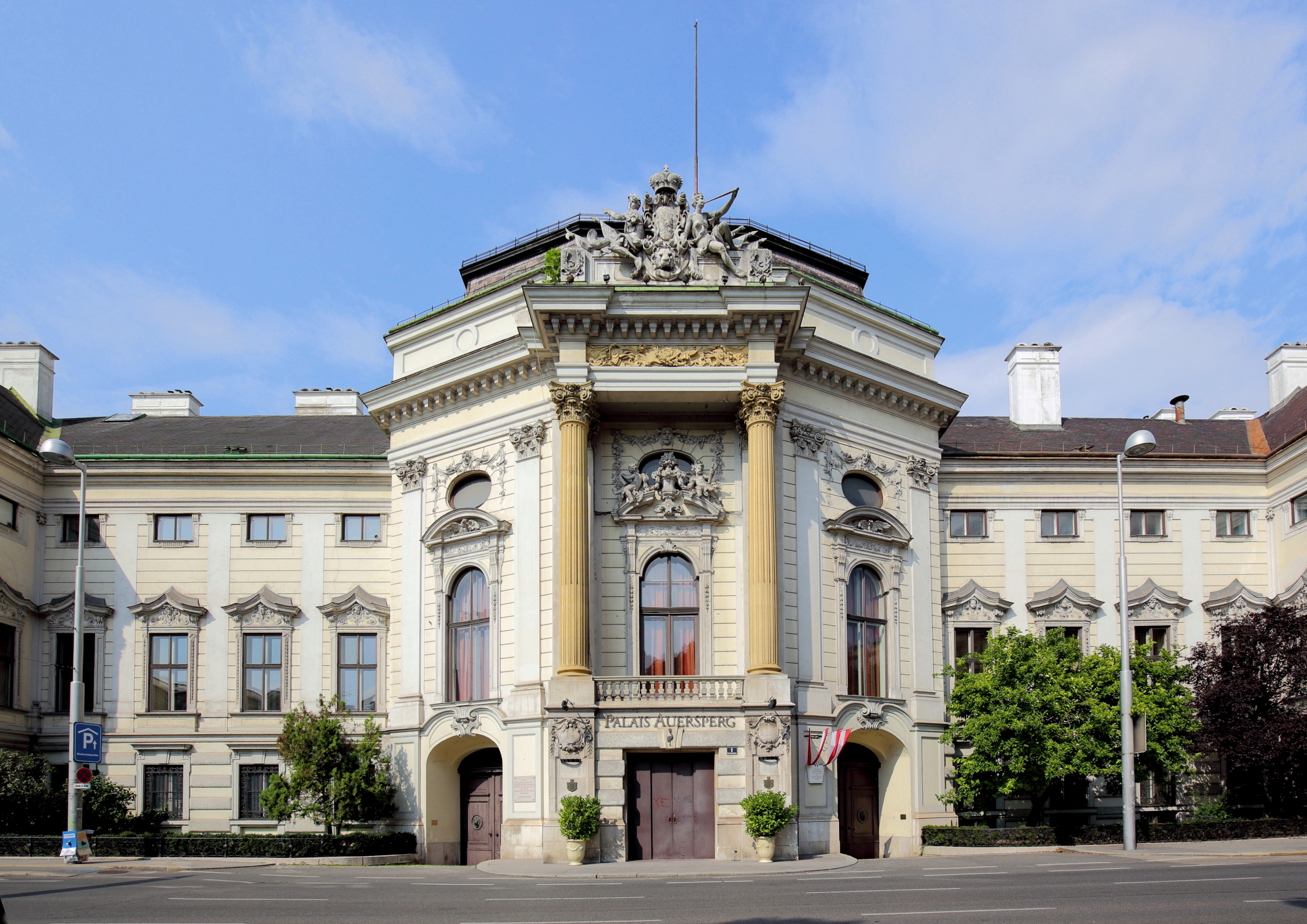
Front entrance

In 1749, Prince Joseph of Saxe-Hildburghausen started to use the palace as his winter residence. He hired Giuseppe Bonno as musical conductor of the palace. Between 1754 and 1761, weekly music courses were held during the winter months. From 1759, he rented the palace and hired Christoph Willibald Gluck as head conductor of the concerts held there.

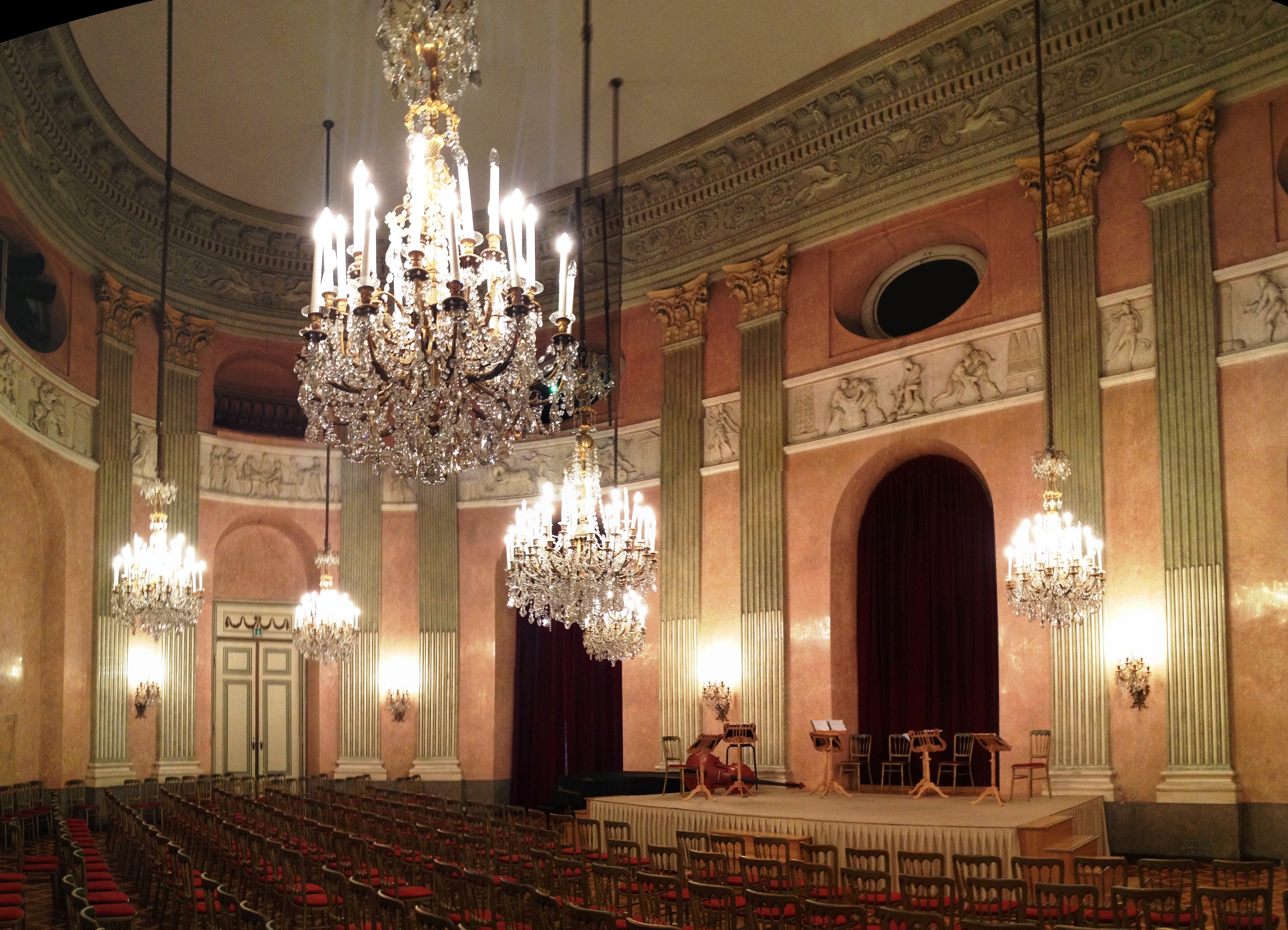
Rosenkavaliersaal in 2014

In 1777, Prince Johann Adam of Auersperg, friend and confidant of Emperor Francis I and Maria Theresia, bought the palace, at that time still called Palais Rofrano. From 1786, the palace was renamed Palais Auersperg and was the setting for a series of important and well-known musical events, notably Idomeneo by Wolfgang Amadeus Mozart (who also conducted), and Sieben Worte des Erlösers am Kreuze by Joseph Haydn.

As Johann Adam of Auersperg's second marriage stayed childless and the children of his first marriage had already died, he adopted his nephew Carl Auersperg (1750–1822). Carl accepted his inheritance in 1795. The marriage of Carl and his wife Josepha also remained childless, so in 1812, they adopted Prince Vinzens Auersperg, who accepted his inheritance in 1817. In the time between 1827 and 1837, Gustav, Prince of Vasa stayed at the Palais Auersperg with the Swedish Royal Family because his inheritance had been contested in Sweden.

In 1864, on the orders of Vinzens Auersperg, a ballroom building was built along the Lerchenfelderstrasse. After his death in 1872, his widow Wilhelmine commissioned further alterations to the ballroom building in order to rent the facilities to the Geometric Institute. In 1878, Franz Joseph Emanuel (1856–1938), son of Wilhelmine Auersperg, and his wife Wilhelmine Kinsky took possession of the Palais Auersperg. Wilhelmine Kinsky organized many charity events for the benefit of the organization called Vereinigung zur Errettung verwahrloster Kinder. Pieces of theatre and music were performed in the Rosenkavaliersaal, partially with the participation of members of the aristocracy.

In 1901, Franz Joseph Auersperg returned the ballroom building to its initial use. During the course of the Second World War, the ballroom building was completely destroyed and the remains were removed. Between 1923 and 1935, the Palais Auersperg was temporarily rented to the Bundesdenkmalamt and a film company.

In 1940, Ferdinand Auersperg (1887–1942) inherited the Palais and in 1942, his sister Christiane Croy accepted her inheritance. She lived with her family in the upper rooms of the Palais during the Second World War. They also hid members of the resistance there during the Second World War, and there is a sign near the entrance of the Palais which commemorates this. In 1944, the organization Provisorische österreichische Nationalkomitee, better known as O5, was established in the Palais. In 1945, the Palais was seized by the Alliierte Kommandantur, the police force of the Allied Control Council, and was subsequently used as their headquarters.

Konsul Alfred Weiss, founder of Arabia Kaffee, bought the Palais in 1953. In 1953 and 1954, it was extended by the architect Oswald Haerdtl, who added the orangery, the winter garden and more functional rooms. Alfred Weiss opened a large café for 600 guests in the Palais, with a terrace next to it. After his death, his descendants sold the Palais to a company called General Partners A.G.

In the beginning of 2006, the Palais was sold again to an old European family. The State Apartments remained the same and are still used for musical purposes. In the upper floor, most areas have been changed into office rooms. In the next few years, the Palais will be restored and a small museum is planned. Currently, the Palais is used for balls and musical events of various kinds; it has eleven rooms and can accommodate up to 1000 guests.

== See also ==
- List of Baroque residences
