= Breitenfeld =

Breitenfeld may refer to:

- Breitenfeld, Leipzig, a northwestern suburb (once an outlying village and crossroads 4 miles (6.4 km) outside of Leipzig's curtain walls) on the plain of Leipzig, Germany
- Two battles that were fought there during the Thirty Years' War:
  - Battle of Breitenfeld (1631)
  - Battle of Breitenfeld (1642)
- Breitenfeld, Saxony-Anhalt, a locality in the town Gardelegen in Saxony-Anhalt, Germany
- Breitenfeld am Tannenriegel, a municipality in Styria, Austria
- Breitenfeld an der Rittschein, a municipality in Styria, Austria

== Breitenfelde ==
or a spelling variant...

- Breitenfelde
