= Schwarzau im Schwarzautal =

- Former municipality
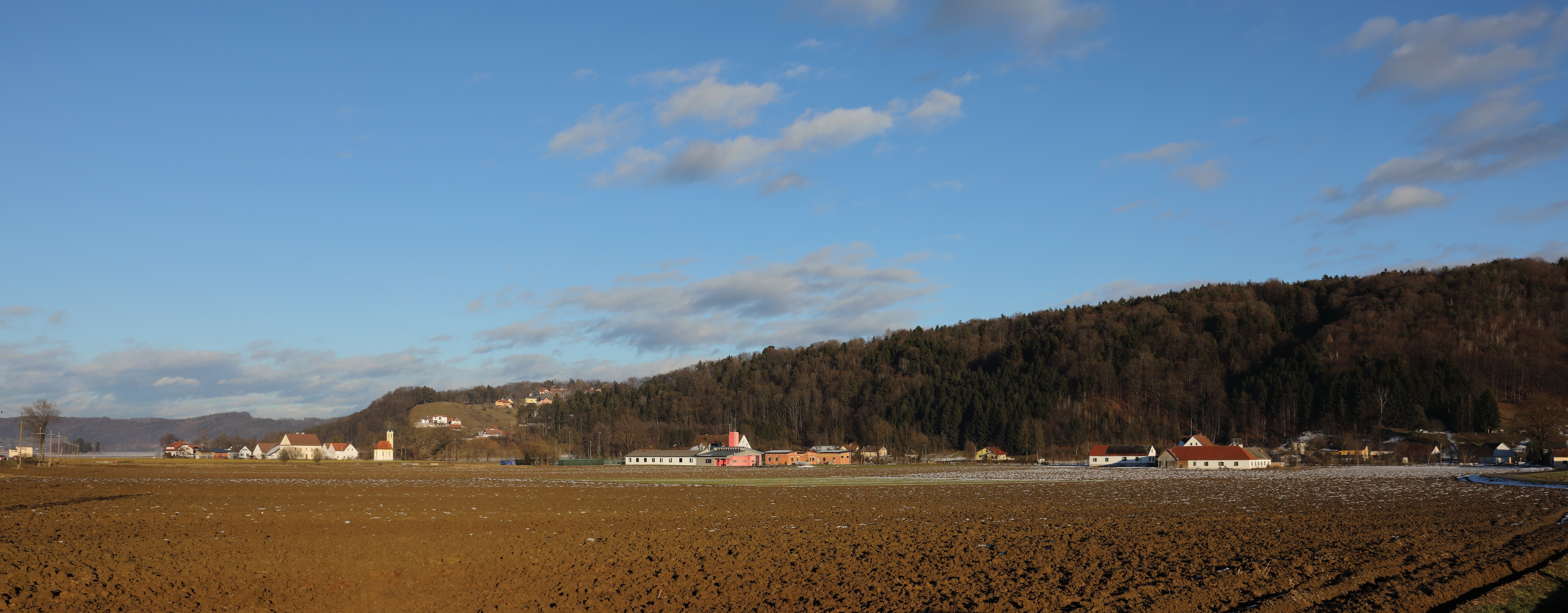
- View of Schwarzau

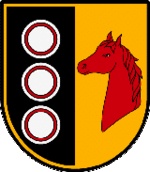
- Coat of arms

- Location within Austria
- Coordinates: 46°53′00″N 15°40′00″E
- Country: Austria
- State: Styria
- District: Leibnitz

Area
  - Total: 10.49 km^{2} (4.05 sq mi)
- Elevation: 298 m (978 ft)

Population (1 January 2016)
  - Total: 641
  - Density: 61.1/km^{2} (158/sq mi)
- Time zone: UTC+1 (CET)
  - Summer (DST): UTC+2 (CEST)
- Postal code: 8421
- Area code: +43 3184
- Vehicle registration: FB
- Website: www.schwarzau-schwarzautal. steiermark.at

Schwarzau im Schwarzautal is a former municipality in the district of Südoststeiermark in the Austrian state of Styria. Since the 2015 Styria municipal structural reform, it is part of the municipality Schwarzautal, in the Leibnitz District.

== Population ==
Historical population
Year	Pop.	±%
1869	755	—
1880	751	−0.5%
1890	757	+0.8%
1900	699	−7.7%
1910	675	−3.4%
1923	679	+0.6%
1934	695	+2.4%
1939	644	−7.3%
1951	629	−2.3%
1961	595	−5.4%
1971	649	+9.1%
1981	669	+3.1%
1991	650	−2.8%
2001	650	+0.0%
2013	634	−2.5%
