= Mitterlabill =

- Former municipality
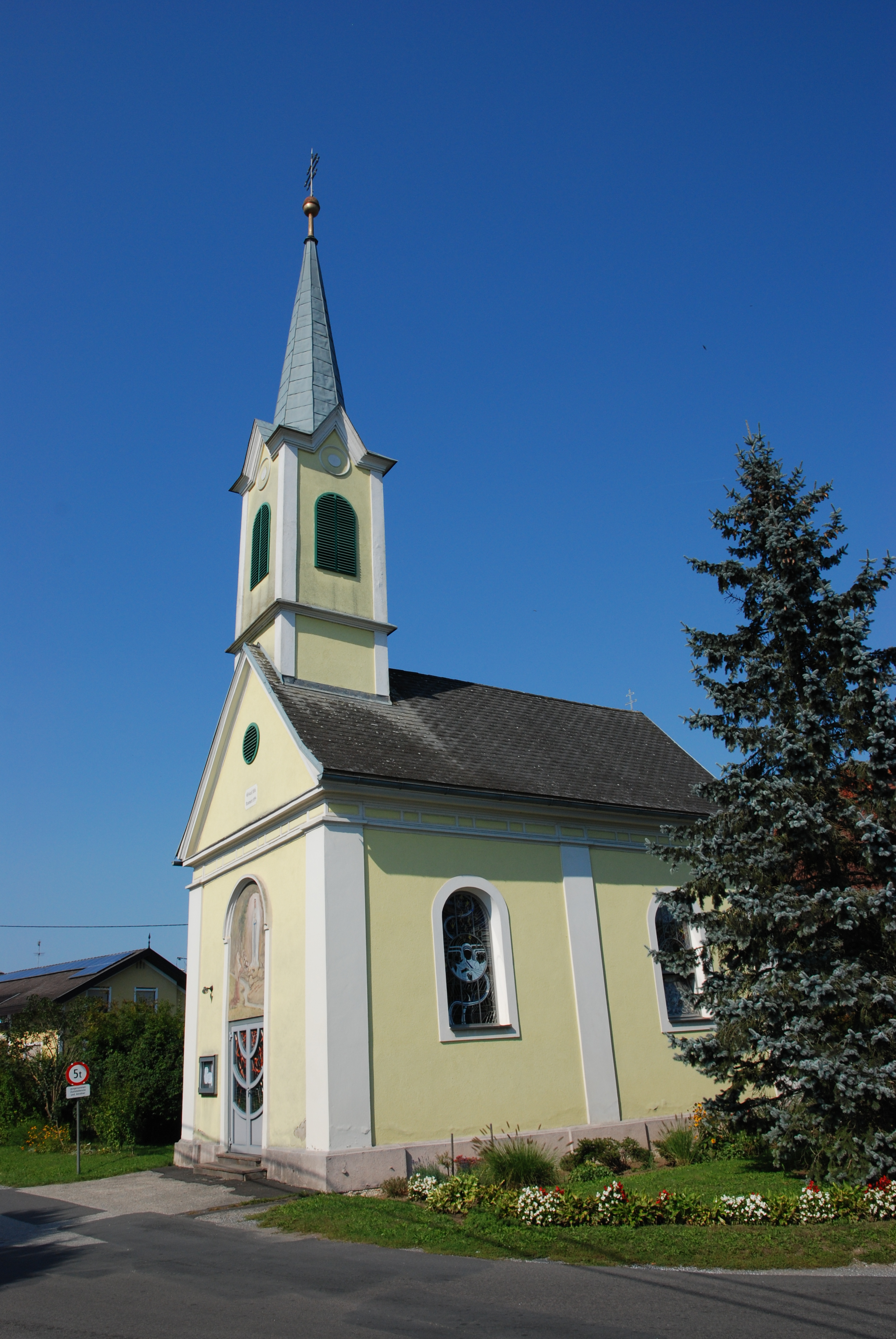
- Chapel in Mitterlabill

- Location within Austria
- Coordinates: 46°53′00″N 15°38′00″E
- Country: Austria
- State: Styria
- District: Leibnitz

Area
  - Total: 7.88 km^{2} (3.04 sq mi)
- Elevation: 309 m (1,014 ft)

Population (1 January 2016)
  - Total: 414
  - Density: 52.5/km^{2} (136/sq mi)
- Time zone: UTC+1 (CET)
  - Summer (DST): UTC+2 (CEST)
- Postal code: 8413
- Area code: +43 3184
- Vehicle registration: FB
- Website: www.mitterlabill. steiermark.at

Mitterlabill is a former municipality in the district of Südoststeiermark in the Austrian state of Styria. Since the 2015 Styria municipal structural reform, it is part of the municipality Schwarzautal, in the Leibnitz District.

== Population ==
Historical population
| Year | Pop. | ±% |
|---|---|---|
| 1869 | 514 | — |
| 1880 | 534 | +3.9% |
| 1890 | 511 | −4.3% |
| 1900 | 531 | +3.9% |
| 1910 | 489 | −7.9% |
| 1923 | 516 | +5.5% |
| 1934 | 474 | −8.1% |
| 1939 | 461 | −2.7% |
| 1951 | 449 | −2.6% |
| 1961 | 443 | −1.3% |
| 1971 | 443 | +0.0% |
| 1981 | 464 | +4.7% |
| 1991 | 456 | −1.7% |
| 2001 | 447 | −2.0% |
| 2013 | 399 | −10.7% |
