= Wolfsberg im Schwarzautal =

- Former municipality
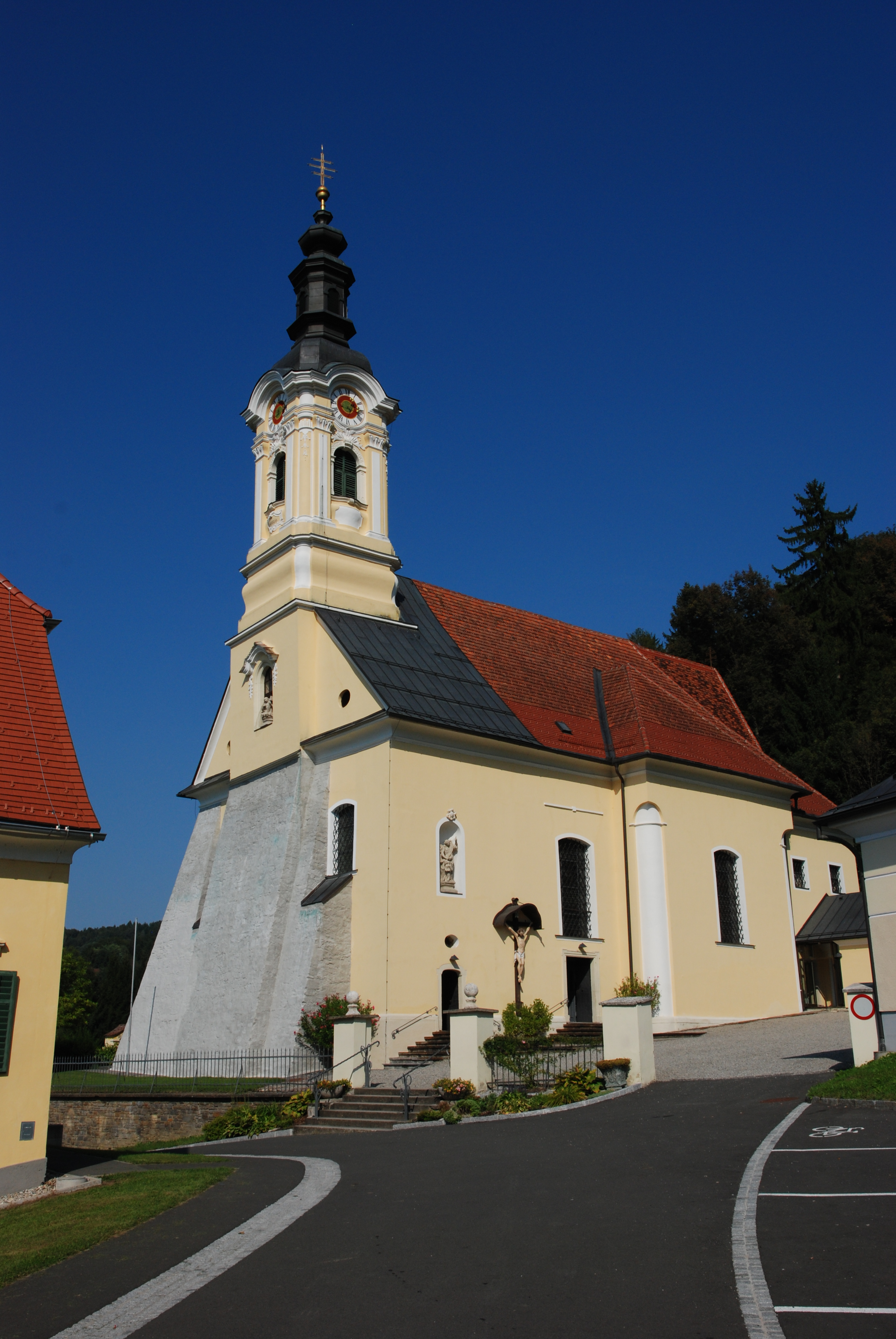
- Church in Wolfsberg

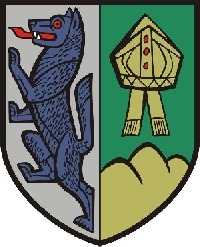
- Coat of arms

- Location within Austria
- Coordinates: 46°49′48″N 15°40′48″E
- Country: Austria
- State: Styria
- District: Leibnitz

Area
  - Total: 10.5 km^{2} (4.1 sq mi)
- Elevation: 304 m (997 ft)

Population (1 January 2016)
  - Total: 799
  - Density: 76.1/km^{2} (197/sq mi)
- Time zone: UTC+1 (CET)
  - Summer (DST): UTC+2 (CEST)
- Postal code: 8421
- Area code: 03184
- Vehicle registration: LB
- Website: wolfsberg-online.at

Wolfsberg im Schwarzautal is a former municipality in the district of Leibnitz in Styria, Austria. Since the 2015 Styria municipal structural reform, it is part of the municipality Schwarzautal.
