= Hainsdorf im Schwarzautal =

- Former municipality
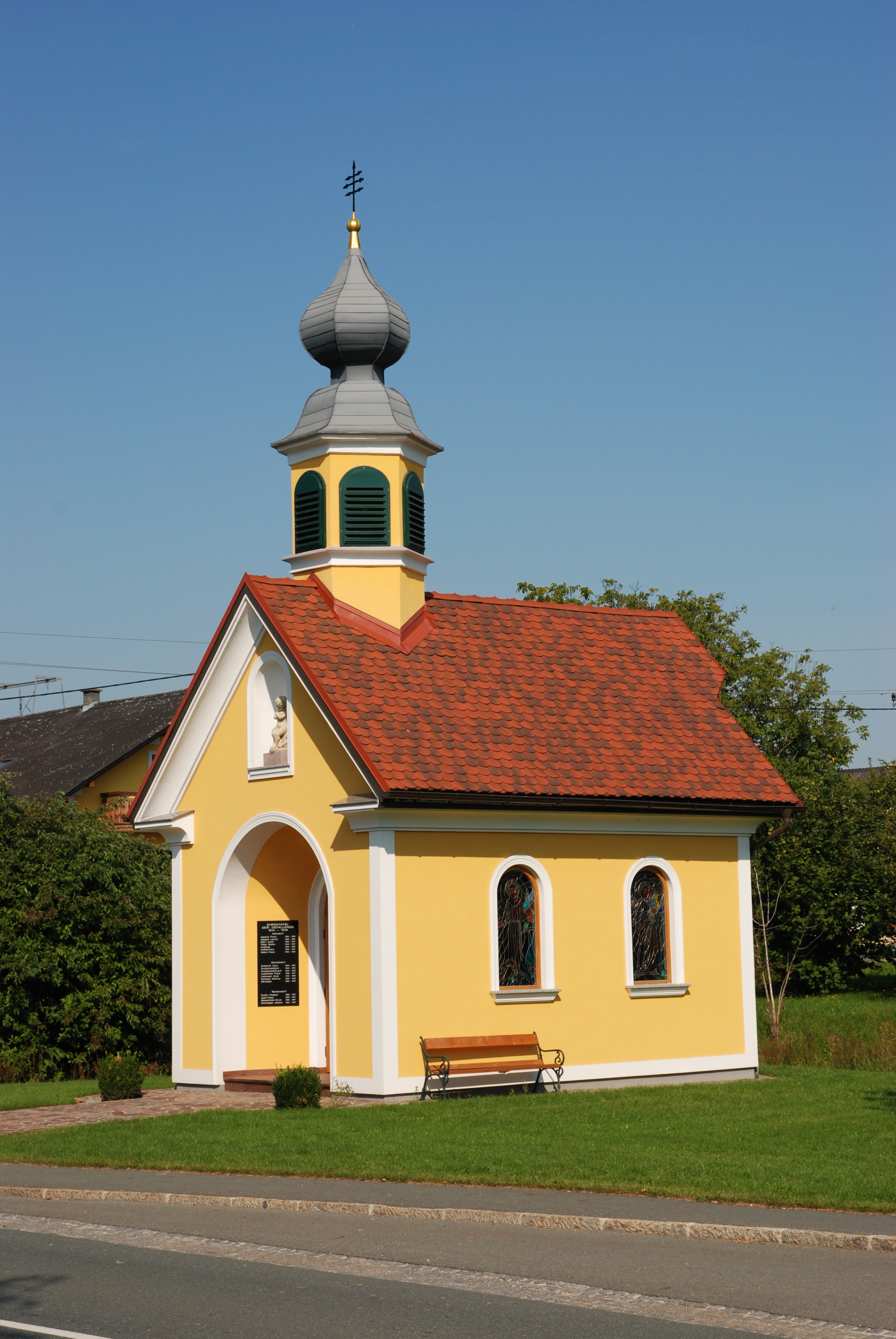
- Hainsdorf chapel

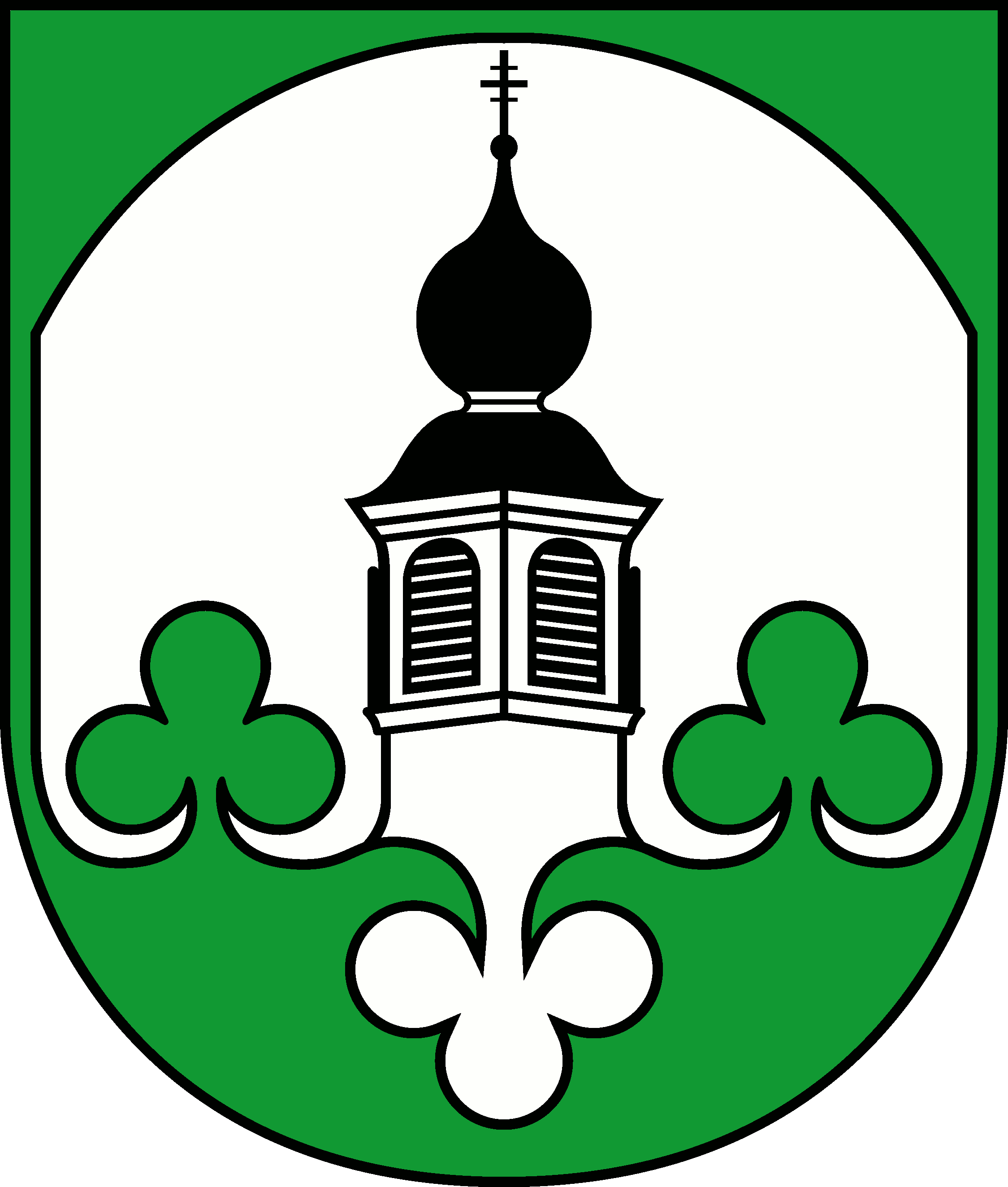
- Coat of arms

- Location within Austria
- Coordinates: 46°49′12″N 15°31′12″E
- Country: Austria
- State: Styria
- District: Leibnitz

Area
  - Total: 6.63 km^{2} (2.56 sq mi)
- Elevation: 284 m (932 ft)

Population (1 January 2016)
  - Total: 289
  - Density: 43.6/km^{2} (113/sq mi)
- Time zone: UTC+1 (CET)
  - Summer (DST): UTC+2 (CEST)
- Postal code: 8421
- Area code: 03184
- Vehicle registration: LB
- Website: www.hainsdorf-schwarzautal. steiermark.at

Hainsdorf im Schwarzautal is a former municipality in the district of Leibnitz in the Austrian state of Styria. Since the 2015 Styria municipal structural reform, it is part of the municipality Schwarzautal.
