= Schwarzautal =

- Municipality
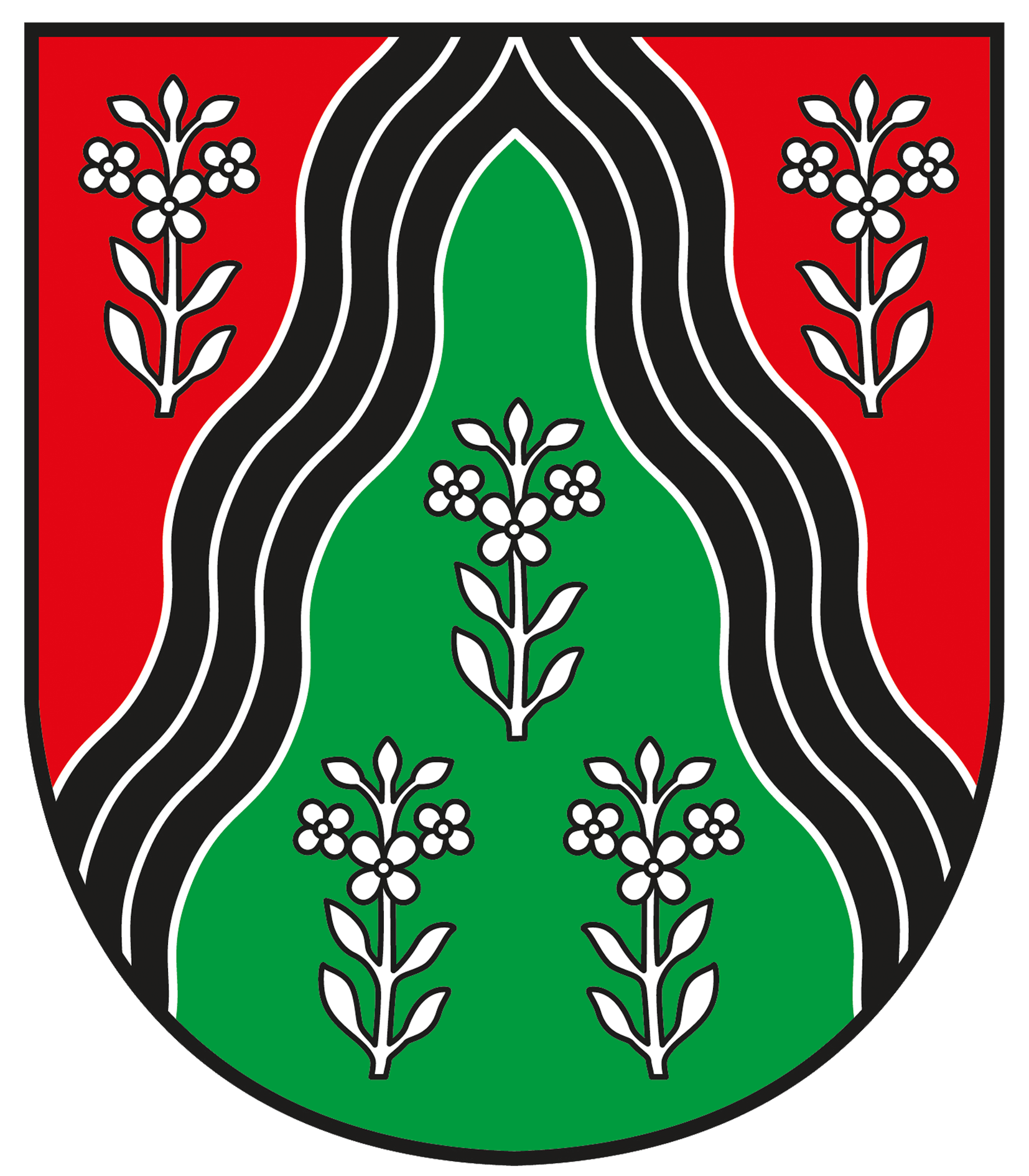
- Coat of arms

- Location within Austria
- Coordinates: 46°49′48″N 15°40′48″E
- Country: Austria
- State: Styria
- District: Leibnitz

Government
  - Mayor: Alois Trummer (ÖVP)

Area
  - Total: 39.94 km^{2} (15.42 sq mi)
- Elevation: 304 m (997 ft)

Population (2018-01-01)
  - Total: 2,310
  - Density: 57.8/km^{2} (150/sq mi)
- Time zone: UTC+1 (CET)
  - Summer (DST): UTC+2 (CEST)
- Postal code: 8421, 8413, 8422
- Area code: +43 3184
- Website: www.schwarzautal.gv.at

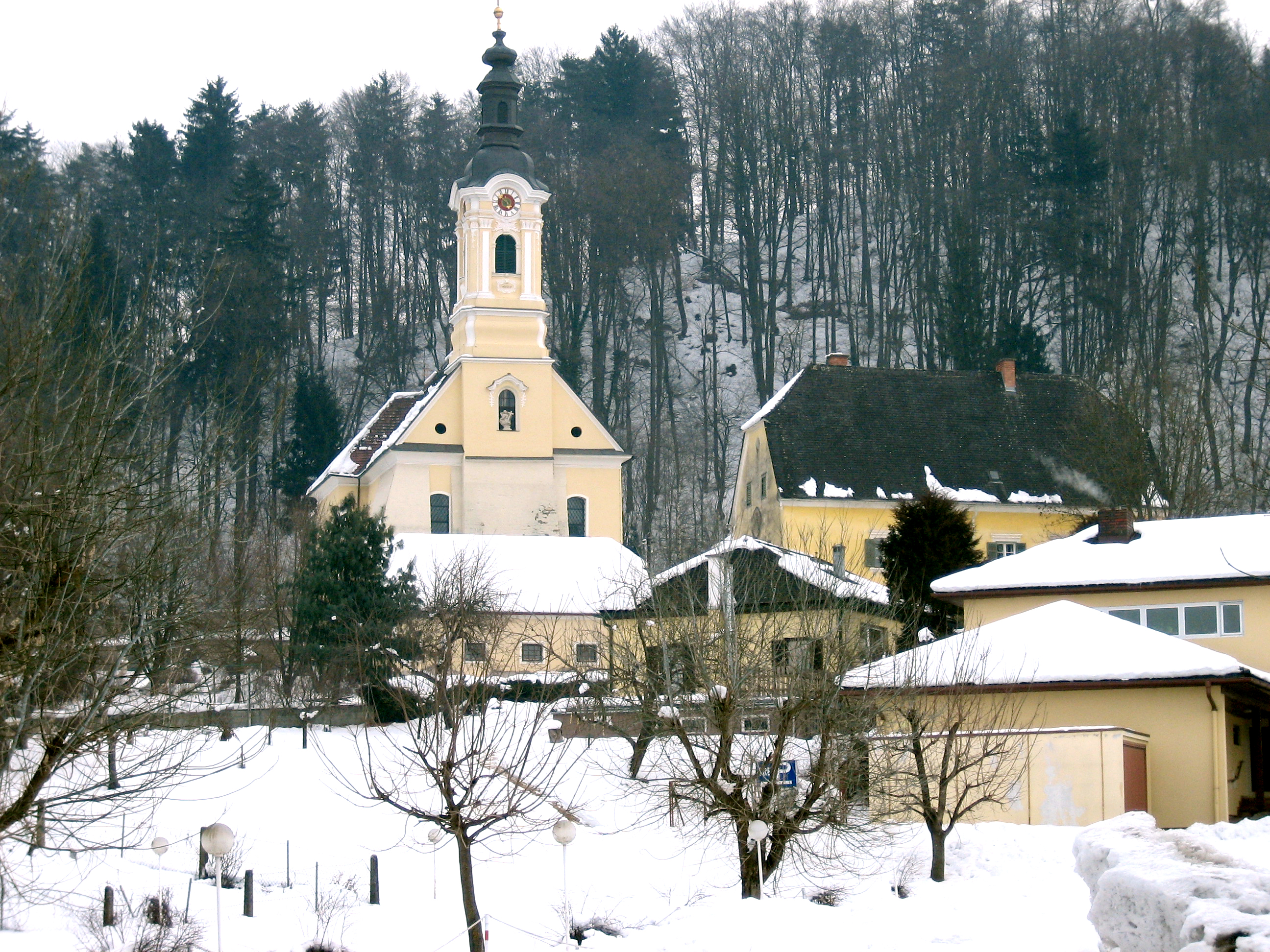
Catholic church Pfarrkirche hl. Dionysius and cemetery in Wolfsberg im Schwarzautal.

Schwarzautal is a market town since 2015 with 2,299 residents (as of 1 January 2016) in the Leibnitz District of Styria, Austria.

The municipality was founded as part of the Styria municipal structural reform, at the end of 2014, by merging the five former towns: Schwarzau im Schwarzautal, Wolfsberg im Schwarzautal, Breitenfeld am Tannenriegel, Hainsdorf im Schwarzautal and Mitterlabill.

The towns Mitterlabill and Schwarzau im Schwarzautal lied in the political district Südoststeiermark, while the other towns lied in the district of Leibnitz. The boundaries of the districts and the judicial districts have been changed so that the new community is now fully in the district and jurisdiction Leibnitz.

Until the end of 2012 the former municipalities Mitterlabill and Schwarzau im Schwarzautal lied in the Feldbach District and had the indicating plate letters "FB". From mid-2013 until the end of 2014, the letters "SO" were assigned, since 2015 "LB" indicates the Leibnitz district.

== Geography ==
=== Municipality arrangement ===
The municipality territory includes nine Katastralgemeinden and 12 towns (populations and areas as of January 2015):

Katastralgemeinden

- Breitenfeld (445.95 ha or 1,102.0 acres)
- Hainsdorf (431.40 ha)
- Maggau (517.50 ha)
- Marchtring (334.34 ha)
- Matzelsdorf (237.19 ha)
- Mitterlabill (495.21 ha)
- Schwarzau (538.45 ha)
- Unterlabill (297.06 ha or 734.1 acres)
- Wolfsberg (723.82 ha or 1,788.6 acres)

Town

- Breitenfeld am Tannenriegel (196)
- Hainsdorf im Schwarzautal (142)
- Maggau (156)
- Marchtring (215)
- Matzelsdorf (85)
- Mitterlabill (223)
- Schwarzau im Schwarzautal (260)
- Seibuttendorf (199)
- Techensdorf (53)
- Unterlabill (163)
- Wölferberg (94)
- Wolfsberg im Schwarzautal (526)

=== Neighboring municipalities ===
The municipality is enclosed by ten neighboring communities, four of them lie in the Südoststeiermark District (SO).

== Politics ==
=== Mayor ===
Alois Trummer (ÖVP) was elected in the inaugural meeting of the Municipal Council in April 2015 as mayor of the new municipality.

The municipal council further includes the Deputy Mayor Martin Kohl (ÖVP) and the municipality treasurer Rupert Wahrlich (Schwarzautal Active - List Rupert Wahrlich).

=== Municipal council ===
The municipal council consists of 15 members. According to the results of the municipal elections in 2015, the seat allocation is as follows:

- 8 seats ÖVP
- 6 seats Schwarzautal Aktiv – Liste Rupert Wahrlich
- 1 seat FPÖ

The prior elections had the following results:

Party	2015			2010														
Party	Schwarzautal			Schwarzau im Schwarz.			Breitenfeld			Hainsdorf			Mitterlabill			Wolfsberg im Schwarz.		
Party	Votes	%	Seats	V.	%	S.	V.	%	S.	V.	%	S.	V.	%	S.	V.	%	S.
ÖVP	795	49	8	380	100	9	137	100	9	191	100	9	287	100	9	252	41	4
SPÖ	66	4	0	not contested												83	13	1
FPÖ	145	9	1	not contested														
Schwarzautal Aktiv; Liste Rupert Wahrlich	631	39	6	not contested												286	46	4
Counts	1,974			536			174			247			367			678		
Percentage	84%			76%			81%			81%			82%			93%		

All percents are based on the total count.

=== Coat of arms ===
Wappen der Vorgängergemeinden

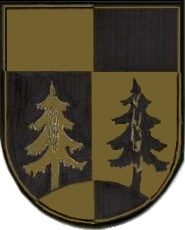
Breitenfeld am Tannenriegel

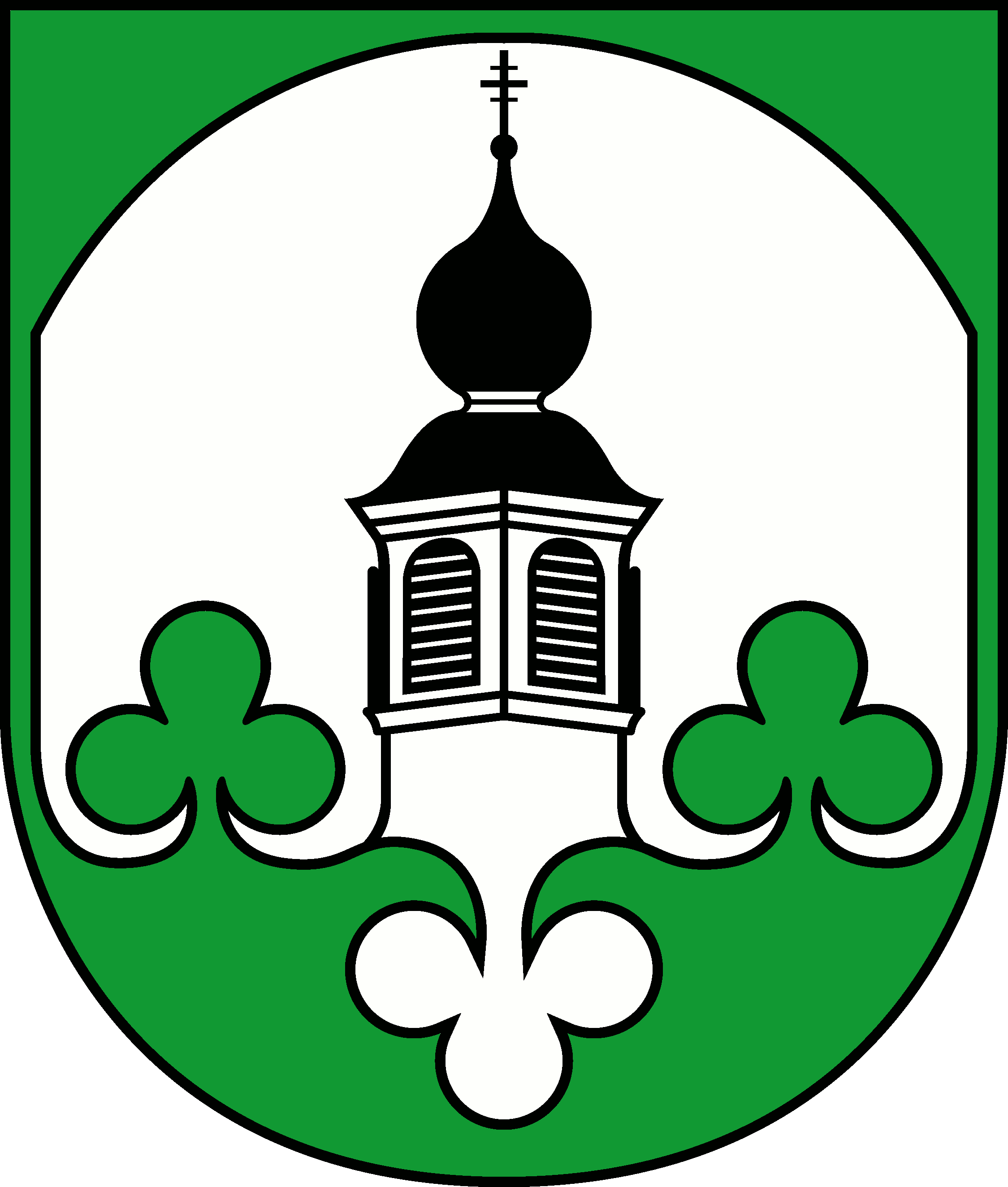
Hainsdorf im Schwarzautal

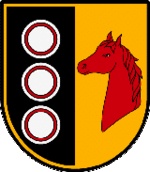
Schwarzau im Schwarzautal

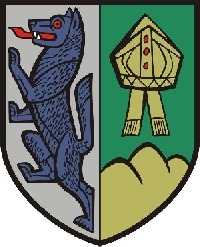
Wolfsberg im Schwarzautal

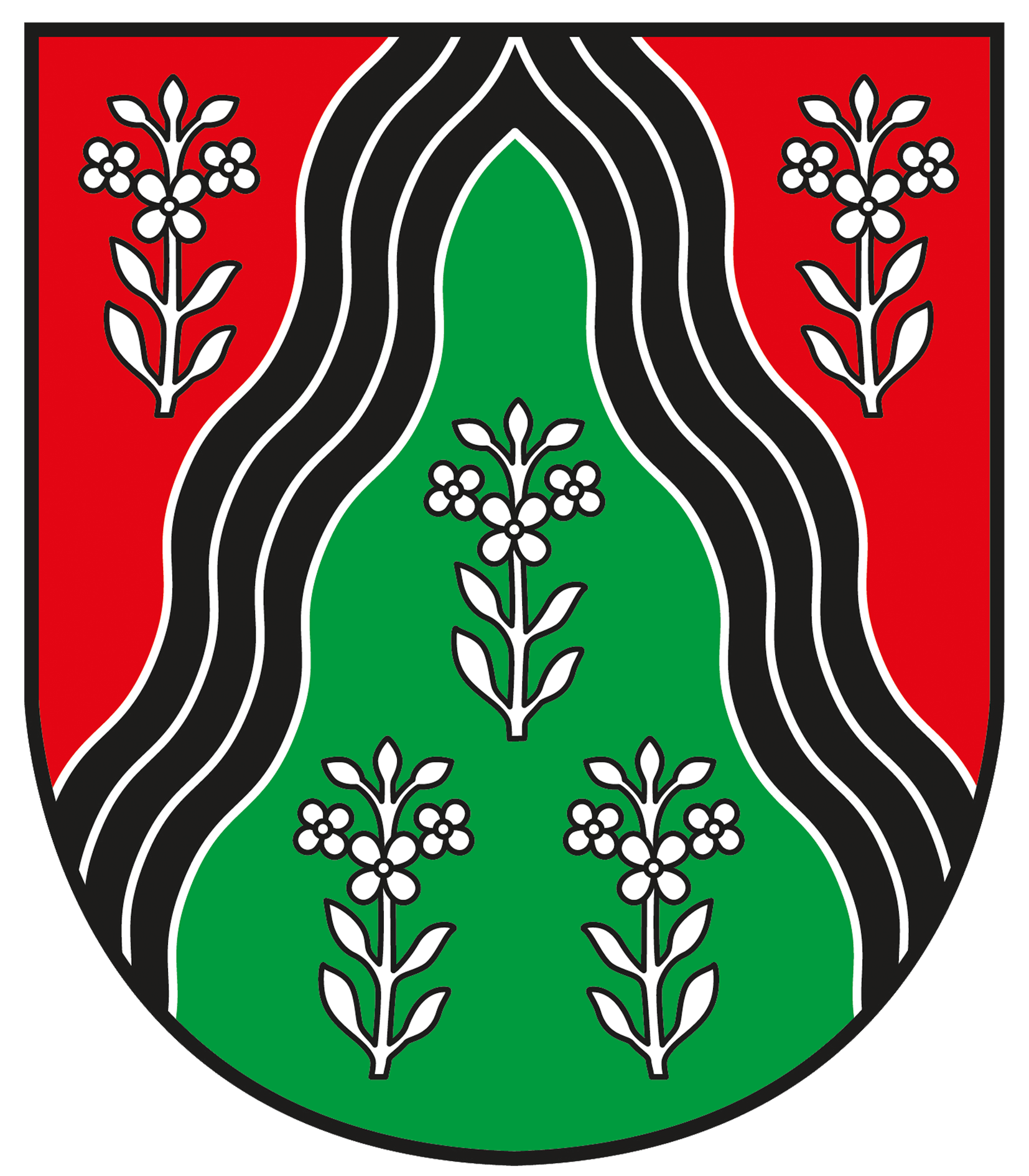

Four of the five predecessor towns had a town crest. Because of the merger, they lost their official validity on January 1, 2015. The authorization of the municipal coat of arms, for the fusion community, was carried out with effect from 15 July 2016.
Blazon (crest description):

"A black, silver-flooded hive, cut in from the upper edge of the shield, in red on each side a three-leafed, seven-beaded silver meadowspowder, and in green center are three (1:2) similar plants".

== Culture and sights ==
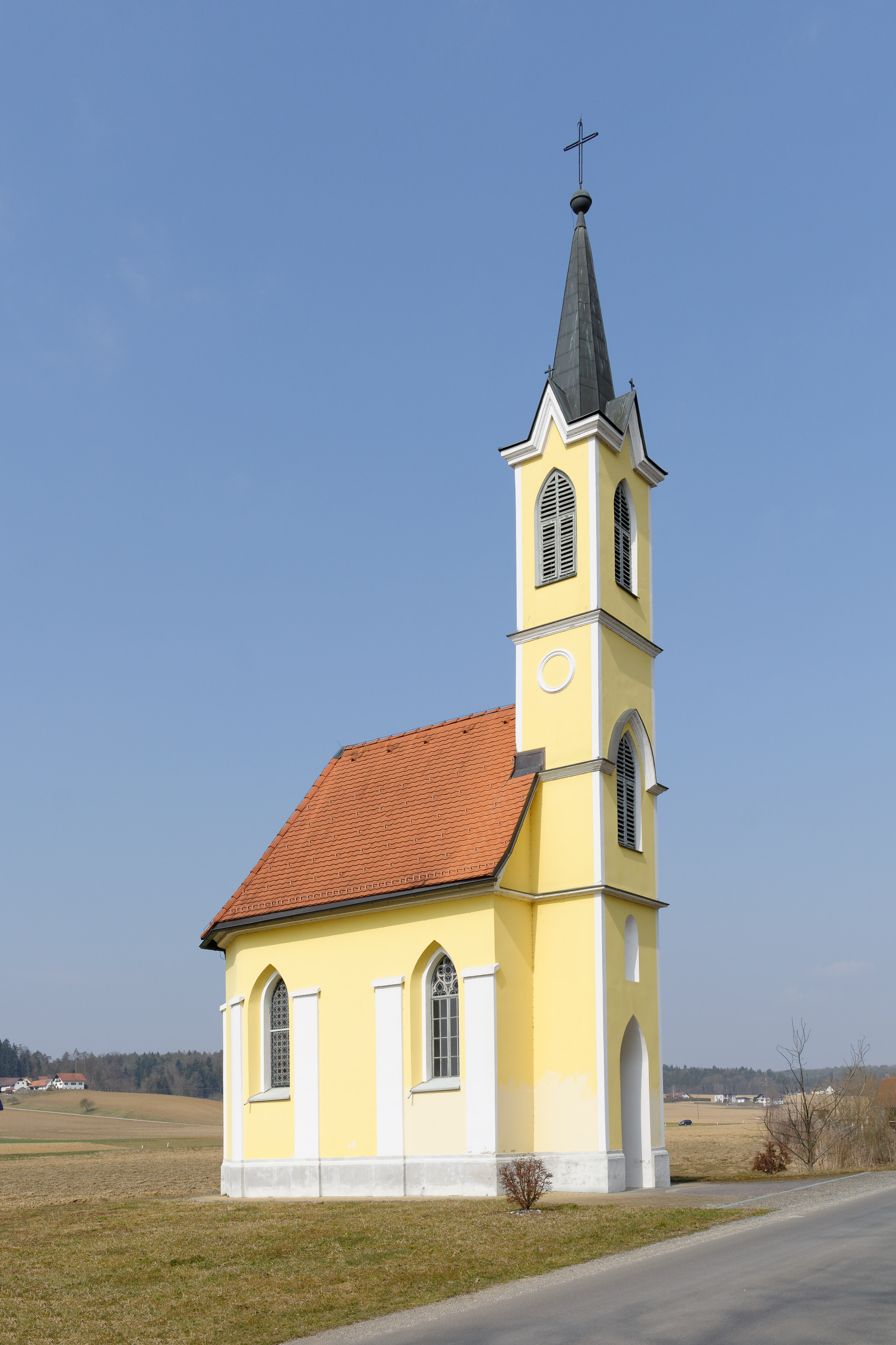
Chapel in Schwarzau im Schwarzautal
