= Breitenfeld am Tannenriegel =

- Former municipality
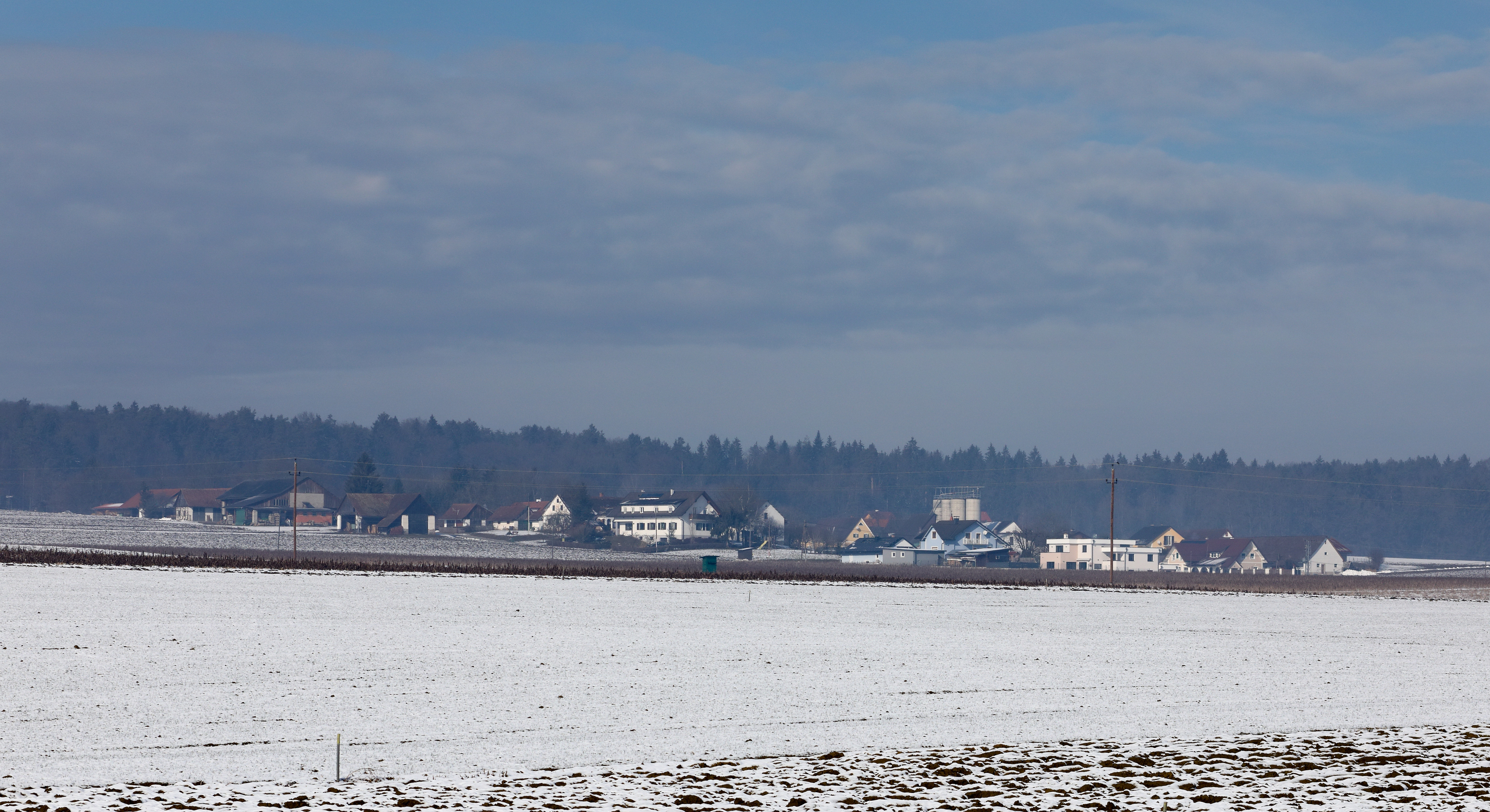
- View of Breitenfeld

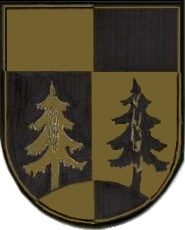
- Coat of arms

- Location within Austria
- Coordinates: 46°51′00″N 15°37′48″E
- Country: Austria
- State: Styria
- District: Leibnitz

Area
  - Total: 4.41 km^{2} (1.70 sq mi)
- Elevation: 310 m (1,020 ft)

Population (1 January 2016)
  - Total: 197
  - Density: 44.7/km^{2} (116/sq mi)
- Time zone: UTC+1 (CET)
  - Summer (DST): UTC+2 (CEST)
- Postal code: 8421
- Area code: 03184
- Vehicle registration: LB
- Website: www.breitenfeld-tannenriegel. steiermark.at

Breitenfeld am Tannenriegel is a former municipality in the district of Leibnitz in Styria, Austria. Since the 2015 Styria municipal structural reform, it is part of the municipality Schwarzautal.
