= Breitenfeld an der Rittschein =

- Former municipality
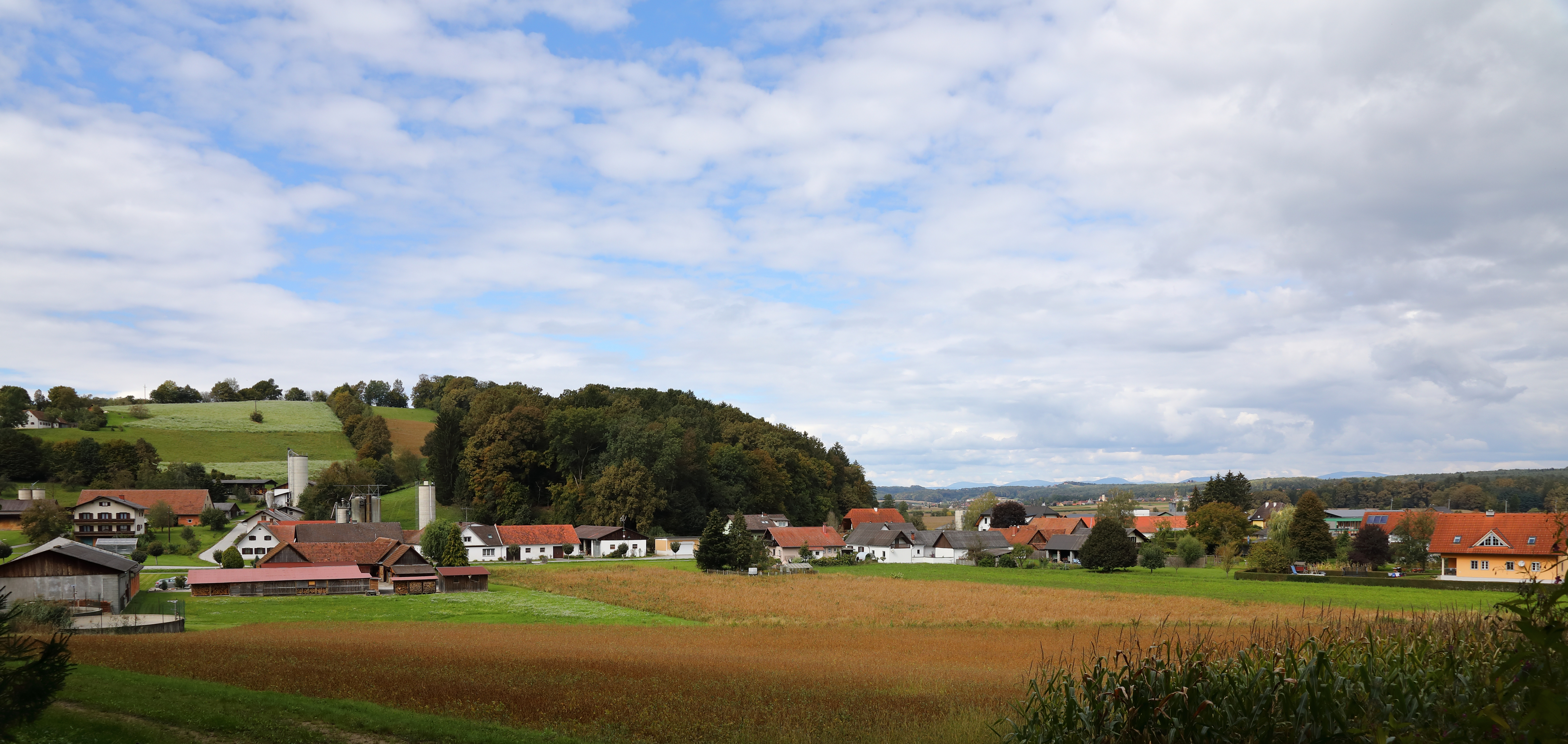
- Breitenfeld ad Rittschein

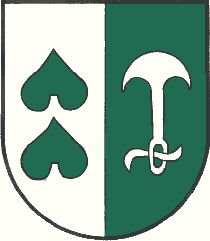
- Coat of arms

- Location within Austria
- Coordinates: 47°01′00″N 15°57′00″E
- Country: Austria
- State: Styria
- District: Südoststeiermark

Area
  - Total: 13.22 km^{2} (5.10 sq mi)
- Elevation: 281 m (922 ft)

Population (1 January 2016)
  - Total: 786
  - Density: 59.5/km^{2} (154/sq mi)
- Time zone: UTC+1 (CET)
  - Summer (DST): UTC+2 (CEST)
- Postal code: 8313, 8333
- Area code: +43 3387
- Vehicle registration: FB
- Website: www.breitenfeld.st

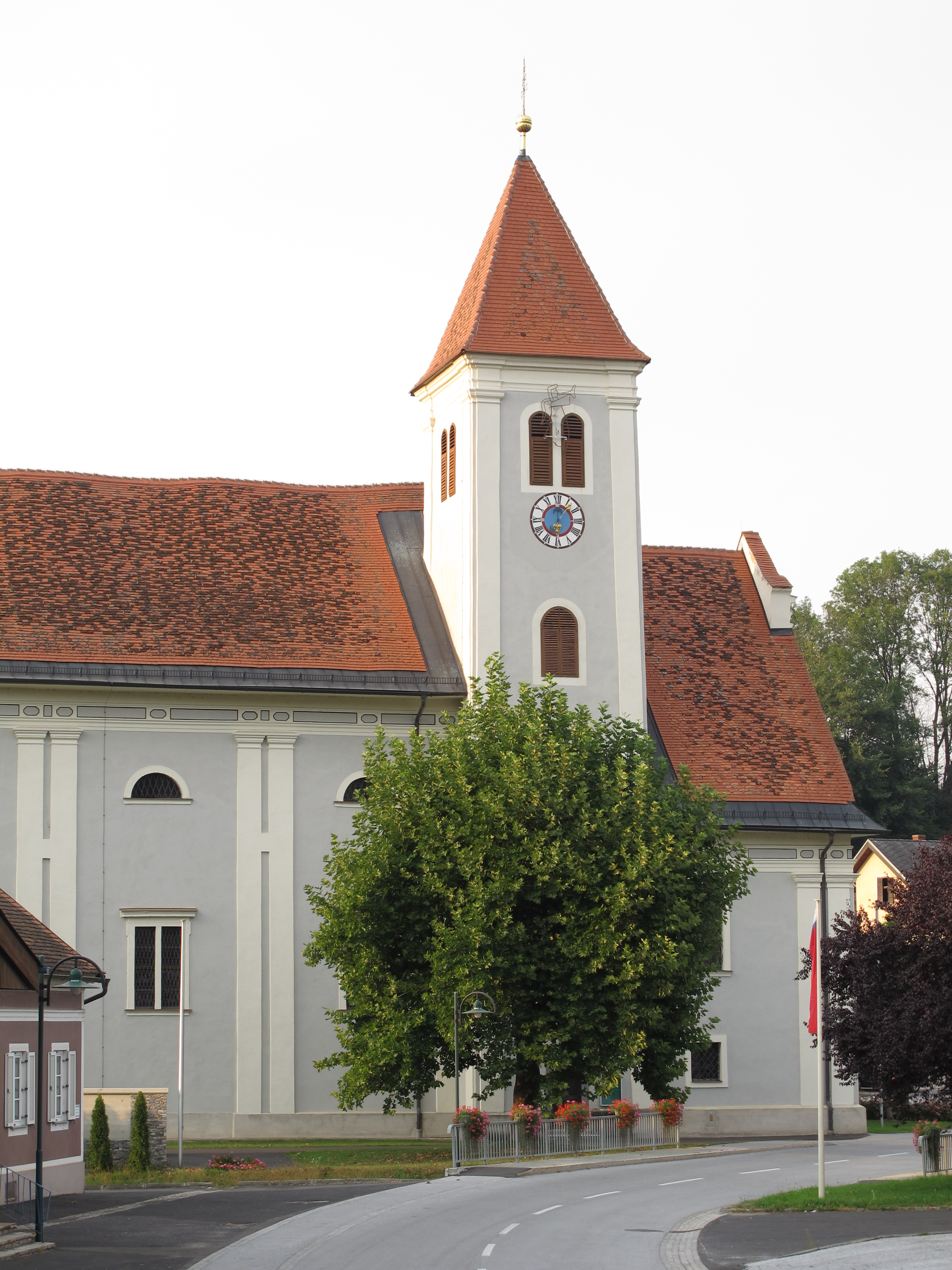
Breitenfeld parish church

Breitenfeld an der Rittschein is a former municipality in the district of Südoststeiermark in the Austrian state of Styria. Since the 2015 Styria municipal structural reform, it is part of the municipality Riegersburg.

== Population ==
Historical population
Year	Pop.	±%
1869	899	—
1880	882	−1.9%
1890	884	+0.2%
1900	897	+1.5%
1910	886	−1.2%
1923	857	−3.3%
1934	860	+0.4%
1939	819	−4.8%
1951	791	−3.4%
1961	817	+3.3%
1971	873	+6.9%
1981	856	−1.9%
1991	853	−0.4%
2001	815	−4.5%
2013	793	−2.7%
