= Niklasdorf train collision =

2018 railway incident in Austria

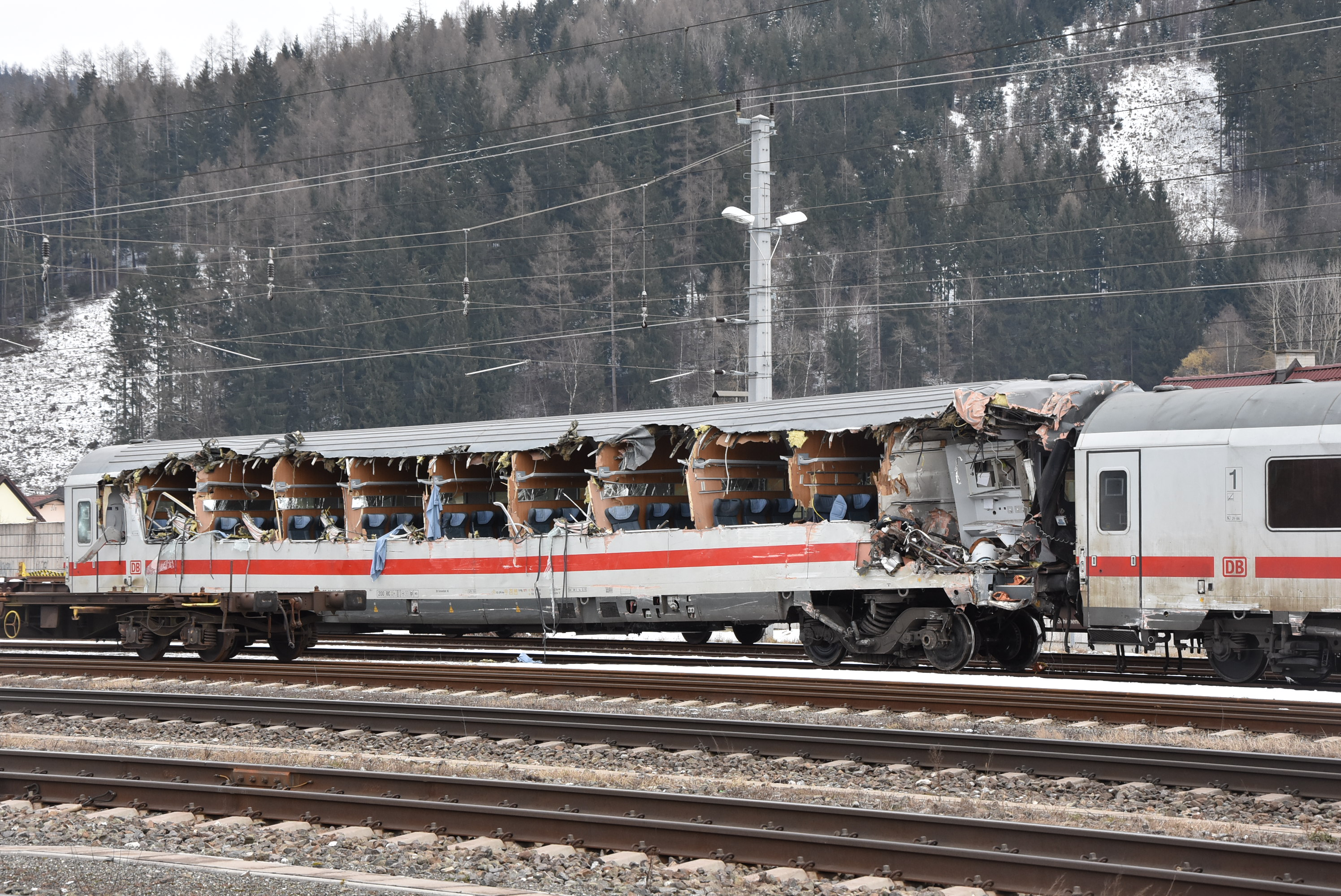

Details
- Date: 12 February 2018; 12:45 CET (11:45 UTC)
- Location: Niklasdorf
- Country: Austria
- Operator: Deutsche Bahn; ÖBB
- Incident type: Sidelong collision
- Cause: Under investigation

Statistics
- Trains: 2
- Deaths: 1
- Injured: 22

On 12 February 2018, two passenger trains collided at Niklasdorf, Austria. One person was killed and 22 were injured.

== Accident ==
At 12:45 Central European Time on 12 February 2018, two passenger trains were involved in a sidelong collision at Niklasdorf, Austria. The trains were a Deutsche Bahn EuroCity express train and a local train operated by ÖBB. Several carriages had one side ripped off. Carriages from both trains were derailed. One person was killed and 22 were injured. Both train drivers were amongst the injured. There were at least 60 passengers on the EuroCity train.

Nineteen ambulances and two emergency doctors were amongst the emergency services personnel sent to deal with the accident. The injured were taken to hospitals in Bruck an der Mur and Leoben. Everyone had been rescued by 14:30. The railway between Bruck an der Mur and Leoben was closed as a result of the accident. The line between Graz and Sankt Michael in Obersteiermark was also closed.

== Investigation ==
An investigation was launched into the cause of the accident by the Federal Accident Investigation Office (German: Unfalluntersuchungsstelle des Bundes).
