= Gai, Styria =

Gai
- Former municipality
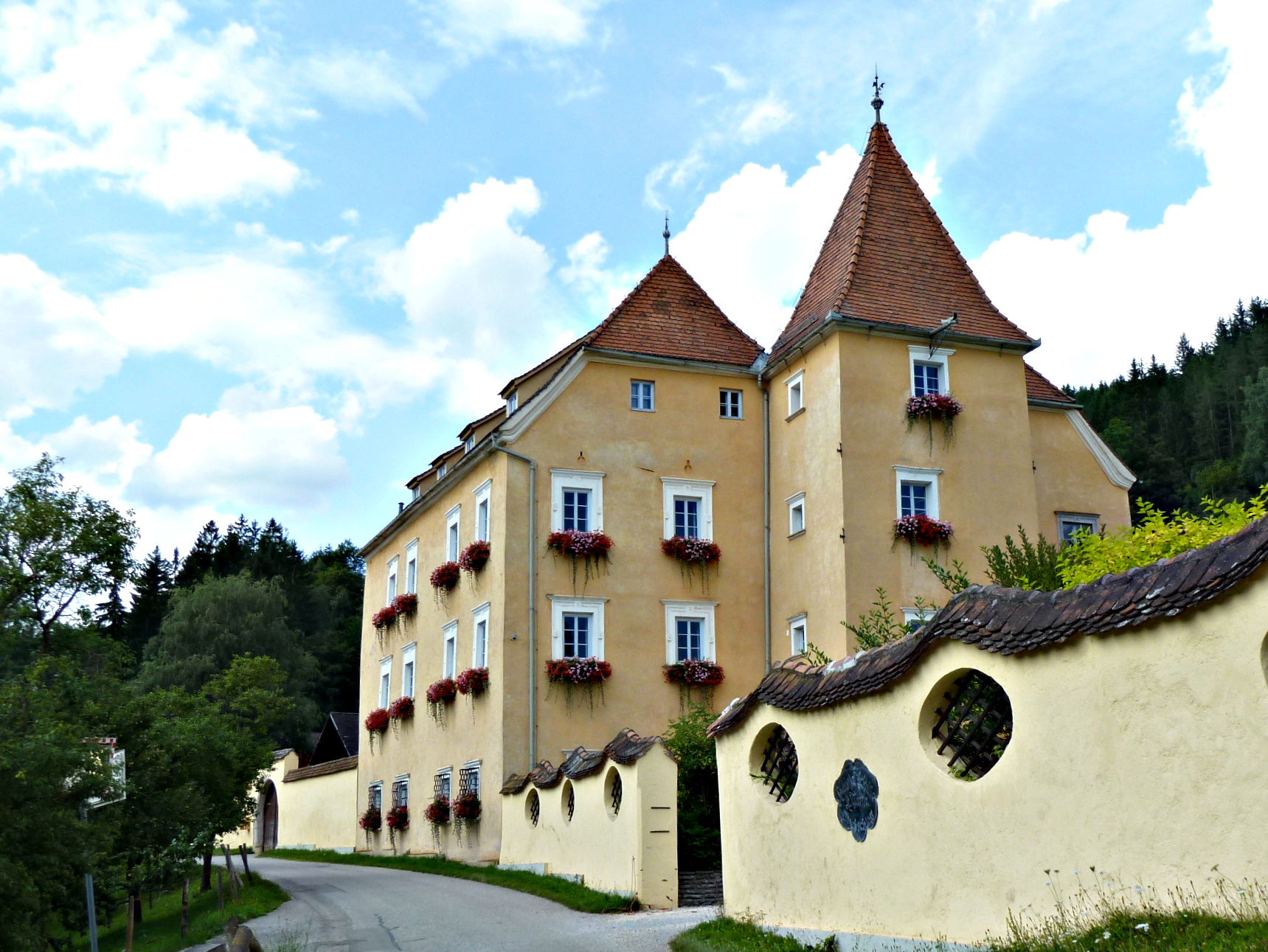

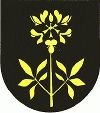
- Coat of arms

- Location within Austria
- Coordinates: 47°24′47.38″N 14°58′11.49″E
- Country: Austria
- State: Styria
- District: Leoben

Area
  - Total: 3.48 km^{2} (1.34 sq mi)
- Elevation: 720 m (2,360 ft)

Population (1-1-2012)
  - Total: 80
  - Density: 23/km^{2} (60/sq mi)
- Time zone: UTC+1 (CET)
  - Summer (DST): UTC+2 (CEST)
- Postal code: 8793
- Area code: +43/3847
- Vehicle registration: LN
- Website: www.gai.steiermark.at

Gai is a former municipality in the district of Leoben in the Austrian state of Styria. Since January 2013, it is part of the municipality Trofaiach.

== Geography ==
Gai lies about 10 kilometres (6.2 mi) northwest of Leoben on the Styrian Eisenstraße, 3 km (1.9 mi) southwest of Trofaiach.
