= Proleb =

- Municipality
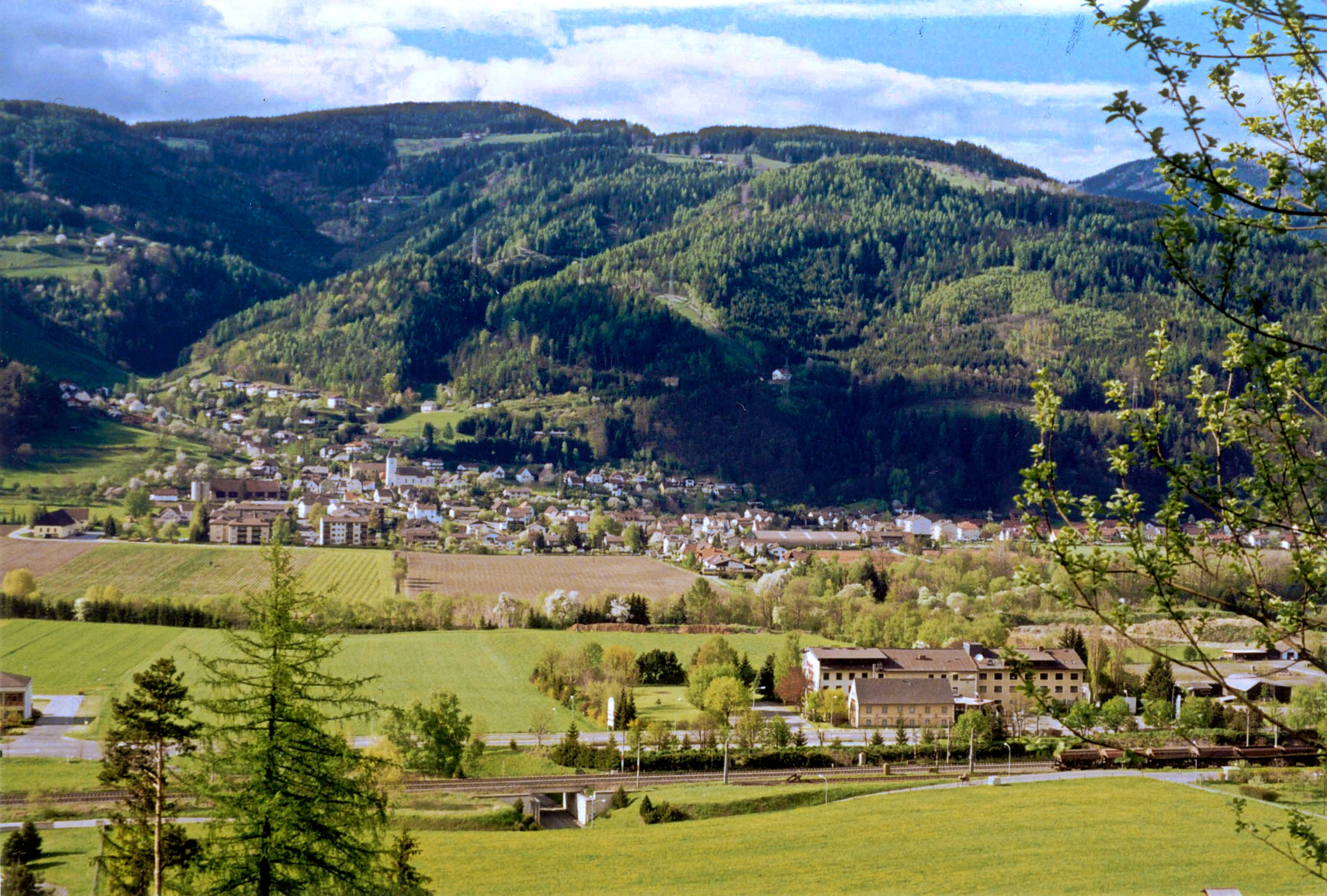
- View of Proleb

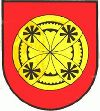
- Coat of arms

- Location within Austria
- Coordinates: 47°24′00″N 15°08′00″E
- Country: Austria
- State: Styria
- District: Leoben

Government
  - Mayor: Werner Scheer (SPÖ)

Area
  - Total: 24.52 km^{2} (9.47 sq mi)
- Elevation: 540 m (1,770 ft)

Population (2018-01-01)
  - Total: 1,534
  - Density: 62.56/km^{2} (162.0/sq mi)
- Time zone: UTC+1 (CET)
  - Summer (DST): UTC+2 (CEST)
- Postal code: 8712
- Area code: 03842
- Vehicle registration: LN
- Website: www.proleb.at

Proleb [prɔˈle:p] is a municipality in the district of Leoben in Styria, Austria. The municipal area comprises the northern Upper Mur-valley between Leoben and Sankt Dionysen, with the valleys of the streams Prentgrabenbach, Prolebbach and Kletschbach. The river Mur is the southern border of the municipal territory. The village valley is at 500 meters above sea level. The municipal area is mostly wooded and reaches up to over 1400 meters above sea level at the Klatschbachkogel.

The area covers 25 square kilometers, with three quarters being wooded and 17 percent used for agriculture.

The village includes the following four cadastral communities (in brackets population as per January 2022):

- Kletschach (74)
- Köllach (382)
- Prentgraben (38)
- Proleb (1098)

Proleb is a LEADER-Region of the Steirische Eisenstraße and belongs to the Regionext-Kleinregion Murtal, which comprises the neighbouring municipal areas Leoben, Niklasdorf, Proleb, Sankt Michael in der Obsteiermark and Sankt Stefan ob Leoben.

Although during the Styrian municipal structural reform between 2010 and 2015 Proleb was in discussion with Niklasdorf regarding a potential merger, the village has maintained its independence.
