= Josef Forster =

Josef Forster may refer to:

- Josef Forster (composer) (1838–1917), Austrian composer
- Josef Bohuslav Foerster (1859–1951), Czech composer, also spelled as "Förster"
