= Hafning bei Trofaiach =

- Former municipality
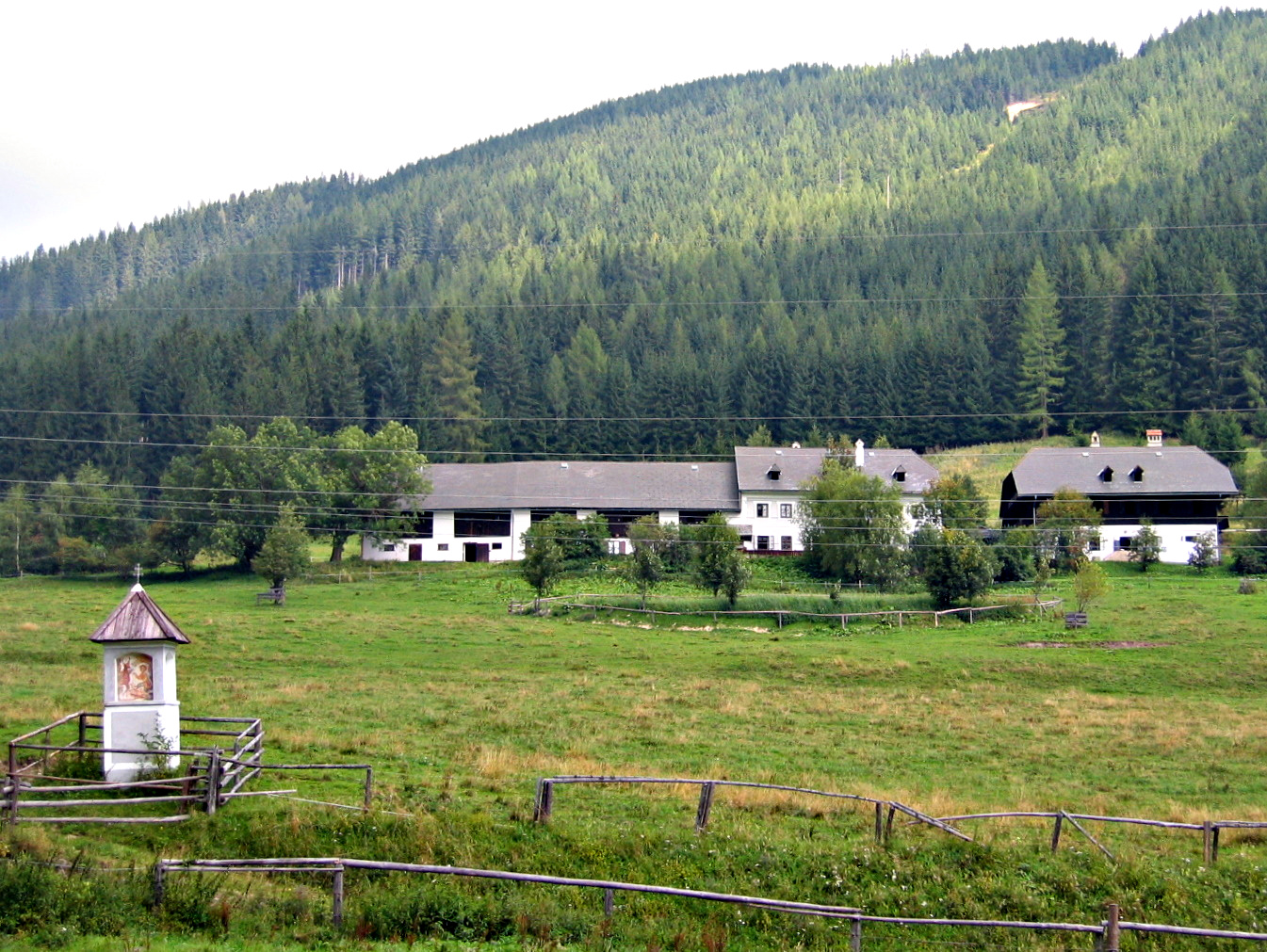
- Rötzhube (part of Hafning bei Trofaiach)

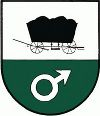
- Coat of arms

- Location within Austria
- Coordinates: 47°26′39″N 14°59′55″E
- Country: Austria
- State: Styria
- District: Leoben

Area
  - Total: 76.34 km^{2} (29.48 sq mi)
- Elevation: 685 m (2,247 ft)

Population (2007-01-01)
  - Total: 1,647
  - Density: 21.57/km^{2} (55.88/sq mi)
- Time zone: UTC+1 (CET)
  - Summer (DST): UTC+2 (CEST)
- Postal code: 8793 and 8794
- Area code: 03847
- Vehicle registration: LN
- Website: www.data-matic.at/hafning

Hafning bei Trofaiach is a village and a former municipality in the district of Leoben in Styria, Austria. Since January 2013, it is part of the town Trofaiach.

== Hafning Gasslfest ==
At the beginning of June, the "Gasslfest" is organised by the tradesmen of Hafning, in which the entire population of Hafning and the surrounding communities take part.
