= Stachel =

Stachel is a surname. Notable people with the surname include:

- Ari'el Stachel (born 1991), American actor
- Hellmuth Stachel (born 1942), Austrian mathematician
- Jack Stachel (1900–1965), American communist
- Johanna Stachel (born 1954), German physicist
- John Stachel (1928–2025), American physicist and philosopher of science
