= Sankt Stefan ob Leoben =

- Municipality
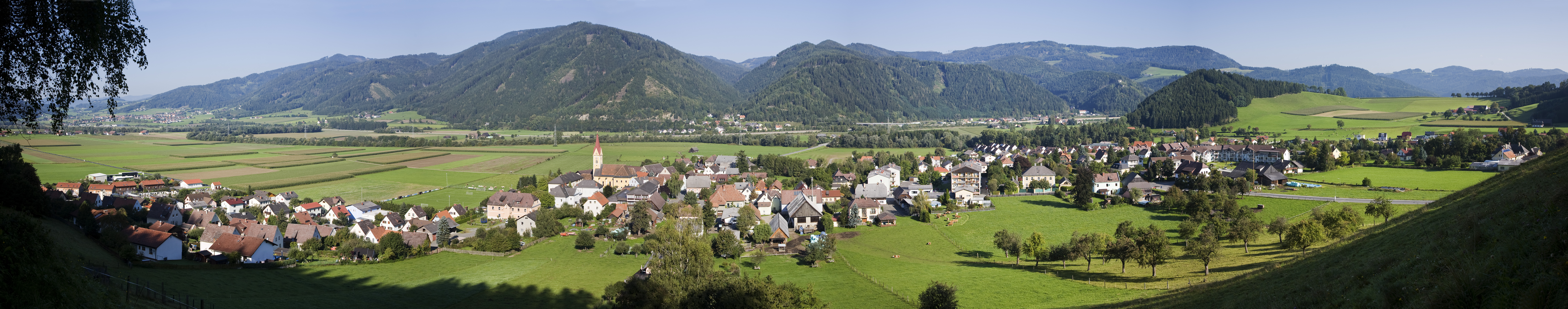
- View of Sankt Stefan ob Leoben

- Coat of arms

- Location within Austria
- Coordinates: 47°19′11″N 14°58′39″E
- Country: Austria
- State: Styria
- District: Leoben

Government
  - Mayor: Ronald Schlager (SPÖ)

Area
  - Total: 78.73 km^{2} (30.40 sq mi)
- Elevation: 588 m (1,929 ft)

Population (2018-01-01)
  - Total: 1,930
  - Density: 24.5/km^{2} (63.5/sq mi)
- Time zone: UTC+1 (CET)
  - Summer (DST): UTC+2 (CEST)
- Postal code: 8713
- Area code: 03832
- Vehicle registration: LN
- Website: www.st-stefan-leoben.at

Sankt Stefan ob Leoben is a municipality in the district of Leoben in the Austrian state of Styria.

== Geography ==
Sankt Stefan lies in the Mur valley about 15 km west of Leoben in the geographical center of Styria.
