= Sankt Peter-Freienstein =

- Municipality
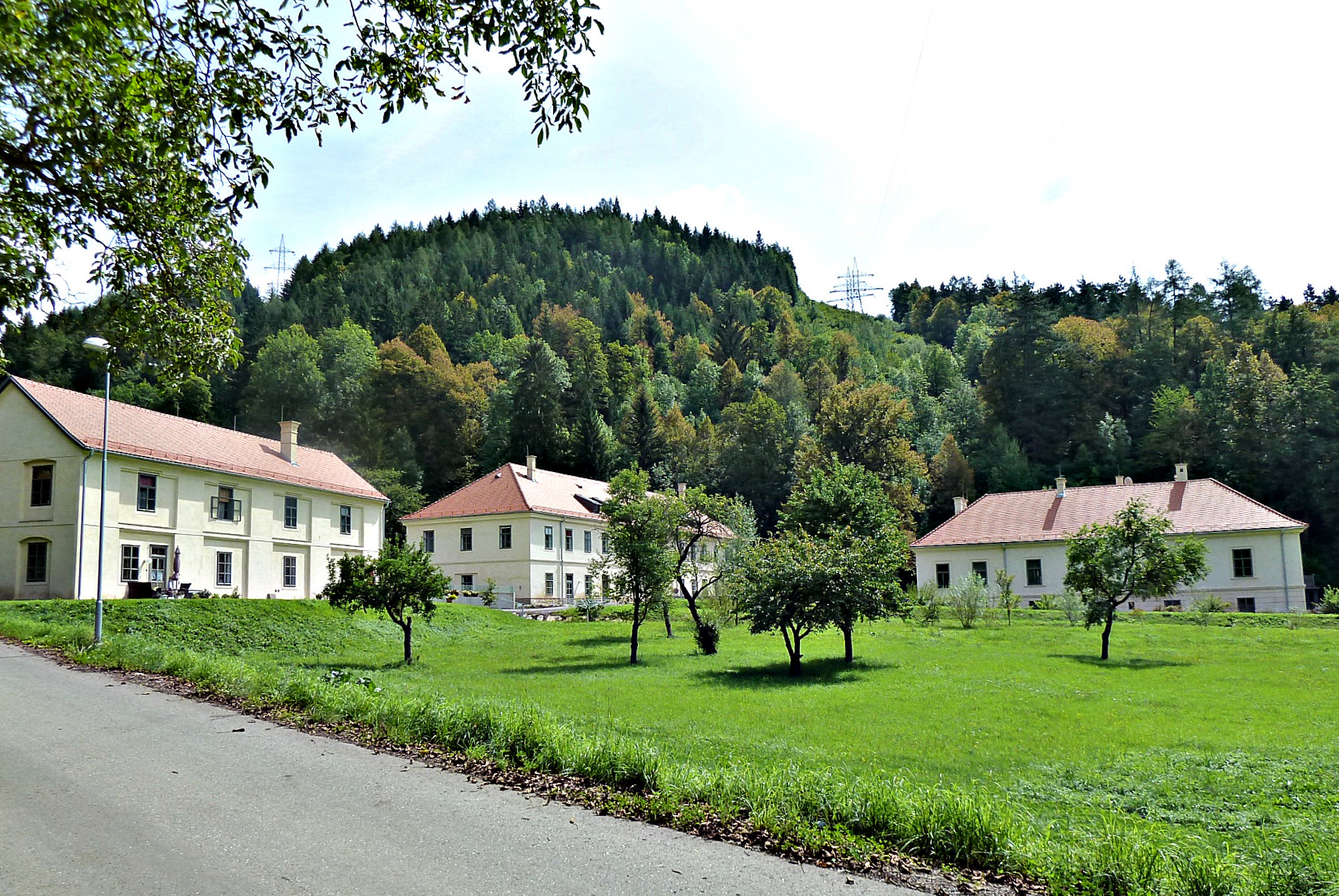
- Freienstein Castle

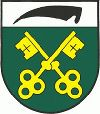
- Coat of arms

- Location within Austria
- Coordinates: 47°24′37″N 15°01′45″E
- Country: Austria
- State: Styria
- District: Leoben

Government
  - Mayor: DI Wolfgang Gomar (SPÖ)

Area
  - Total: 27.33 km^{2} (10.55 sq mi)
- Elevation: 600 m (2,000 ft)

Population (2018-01-01)
  - Total: 2,383
  - Density: 87.19/km^{2} (225.8/sq mi)
- Time zone: UTC+1 (CET)
  - Summer (DST): UTC+2 (CEST)
- Postal code: 8792
- Area code: 03842
- Vehicle registration: LN
- Website: www.st-peter-freienstein. gv.at

Sankt Peter-Freienstein is a municipality in the district of Leoben in Austrian state of Styria.

== Geography ==
The municipality lies on the southeast edge of the Eisenerz Alps the Vordernberger valley.
