= Leoben District =

Leoben District Bezirk Leoben (German)
- District
- Country: Austria
- Federal state: Styria
- Capital: Leoben
- Municipalities: 17

Government
  - District Governor: Markus Kraxner

Area
  - Total: 1,099.7 km^{2} (424.6 sq mi)

Population (2025)
  - Total: 59,071
  - Density: 53.716/km^{2} (139.12/sq mi)
- Time zone: UTC+01:00 (CET)
  - Summer (DST): UTC+02:00 (CEST)
- Vehicle registration: LE, LN (Note: LE for the city of Leoben, LN elsewhere.)
- NUTS code: AT223

Leoben District (German: [leˈoːbm̩]) is a district in the federal state of Styria in Austria. It has a population of 59,071 in an area of 1,099.7 square kilometres (424.6 sq mi) across its 17 municipalities.

== Municipalities ==
Towns (Städte) are indicated in boldface; market towns (Marktgemeinden) in italics; suburbs, hamlets and other subdivisions of a municipality are indicated in small characters.

- **Eisenerz**
- Hieflau
  - Jassingau
- Kalwang
  - Pisching, Schattenberg, Sonnberg
- Kammern im Liesingtal
  - Dirnsdorf, Glarsdorf, Leims, Liesing, Mochl, Mötschendorf, Pfaffendorf, Seiz, Sparsbach, Wolfgruben
- Kraubath an der Mur
  - Kraubathgraben, Leising
- **Leoben**
  - Donawitz, Göß, Hinterberg, Judendorf, Leitendorf, Seegraben
- Mautern in Steiermark
  - Eselberg, Liesingau, Magdwiesen, Rannach, Reitingau
- Niklasdorf
- Proleb
  - Kletschach, Köllach, Prentgraben
- Radmer
  - Radmer an der Hasel, Radmer an der Stube
- Sankt Michael in Obersteiermark
  - Brunn, Greith, Hinterlainsach, Jassing, Liesingtal, Vorderlainsach
- Sankt Peter-Freienstein
  - Hessenberg, Tollinggraben, Traidersberg
- Sankt Stefan ob Leoben
  - Kaisersberg, Lichtensteinerberg, Lobming, Niederdorf, Zmöllach
- Traboch
  - Madstein, Stadlhof, Timmersdorf
- **Trofaiach**
  - Edling, Gai, Gausendorf, Gimplach, Gößgraben, Hafning bei Trofaiach, Krumpen, Kurzheim, Laintal, Oberdorf, Putzenberg, Rötz, Schardorf, Töllach, Treffning, Untergimplach, Unterkurzheim, Windischbühel
- Vordernberg
- Wald am Schoberpaß
  - Liesing, Melling

== Demographics ==
As of 2025, the population is 59,071, of which 49.1% are male and 50.9% are female. Minors make up 14.1% of the population, and seniors make up 26.4%.

Historical population

Year	Pop.	±%
1869	34,502	—
1880	40,315	+16.8%
1890	46,256	+14.7%
1900	56,486	+22.1%
1910	63,069	+11.7%
1923	67,734	+7.4%
1934	65,434	−3.4%
1939	73,262	+12.0%

Year	Pop.	±%
1951	81,942	+11.8%
1961	83,197	+1.5%
1971	85,055	+2.2%
1981	79,154	−6.9%
1991	72,210	−8.8%
2001	66,748	−7.6%
2011	61,912	−7.2%
2021	58,941	−4.8%

Source: Statistics Austria

=== Immigration ===
As of 2025, immigrants make up 16.2% of the total population. The 5 largest foreign countries of birth are Bosnia and Herzegovina, Romania, Germany, Ukraine, and Croatia.
