= Wald am Schoberpass =

Wald am Schoberpaß
- Municipality
- Coat of arms

- Location within Austria
- Coordinates: 47°26′N 14°40′E
- Country: Austria
- State: Styria
- District: Leoben

Government
  - Mayor: Hans Schrabacher (SPÖ)

Area
  - Total: 90.43 km^{2} (34.92 sq mi)
- Elevation: 841 m (2,759 ft)

Population (2018-01-01)
  - Total: 586
  - Density: 6.48/km^{2} (16.8/sq mi)
- Time zone: UTC+1 (CET)
  - Summer (DST): UTC+2 (CEST)
- Postal code: 8781
- Area code: 03834
- Vehicle registration: LN
- Website: www.schoberpass.at

Wald am Schoberpass is a municipality in the district of Leoben in the Austrian state of Styria.

== Geography ==
The Schober Pass (elevation 849 metres or 2,785 feet) is a high mountain pass within the municipality. Wald am Schoberpaß lies on the Schober Pass between the Niederen Tauern and the Eisenerz Alps. The pass separates the watershed of the Palten, which flows into the Enns, and the Liesing, which flows into the Mur.
