= Vordernberg =

- Municipality
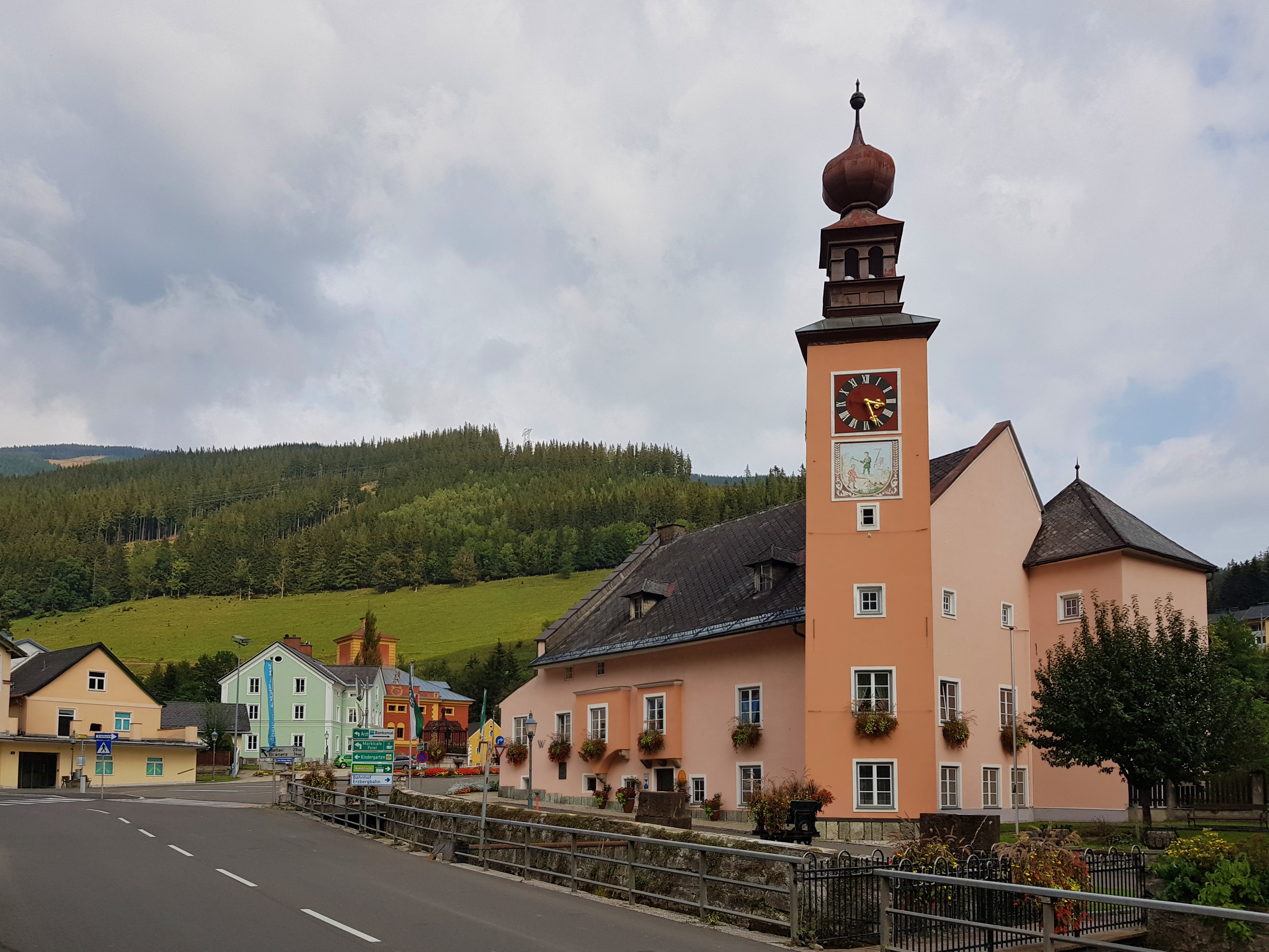

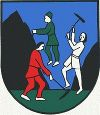
- Coat of arms

- Location within Austria
- Coordinates: 47°29′17″N 14°59′36″E
- Country: Austria
- State: Styria
- District: Leoben

Government
  - Mayor: Walter Hubner (SPÖ)

Area
  - Total: 27.74 km^{2} (10.71 sq mi)
- Elevation: 820 m (2,690 ft)

Population (2018-01-01)
  - Total: 1,045
  - Density: 37.67/km^{2} (97.57/sq mi)
- Time zone: UTC+1 (CET)
  - Summer (DST): UTC+2 (CEST)
- Postal code: 8794
- Area code: 03849
- Vehicle registration: LN
- Website: www.vordernberg. steiermark.at

Vordernberg is a municipality in the district of Leoben in the Austrian state of Styria.

== Population ==
Historical population
Year	Pop.	±%
1869	2,468	—
1880	3,012	+22.0%
1890	3,118	+3.5%
1900	3,112	−0.2%
1910	2,770	−11.0%
1934	2,516	−9.2%
1939	2,781	+10.5%
1951	2,739	−1.5%
1961	2,896	+5.7%
1971	2,519	−13.0%
1981	2,109	−16.3%
1991	1,832	−13.1%
2001	1,391	−24.1%
2011	1,080	−22.4%
2021	953	−11.8%
