= Kraubath an der Mur =

- Municipality
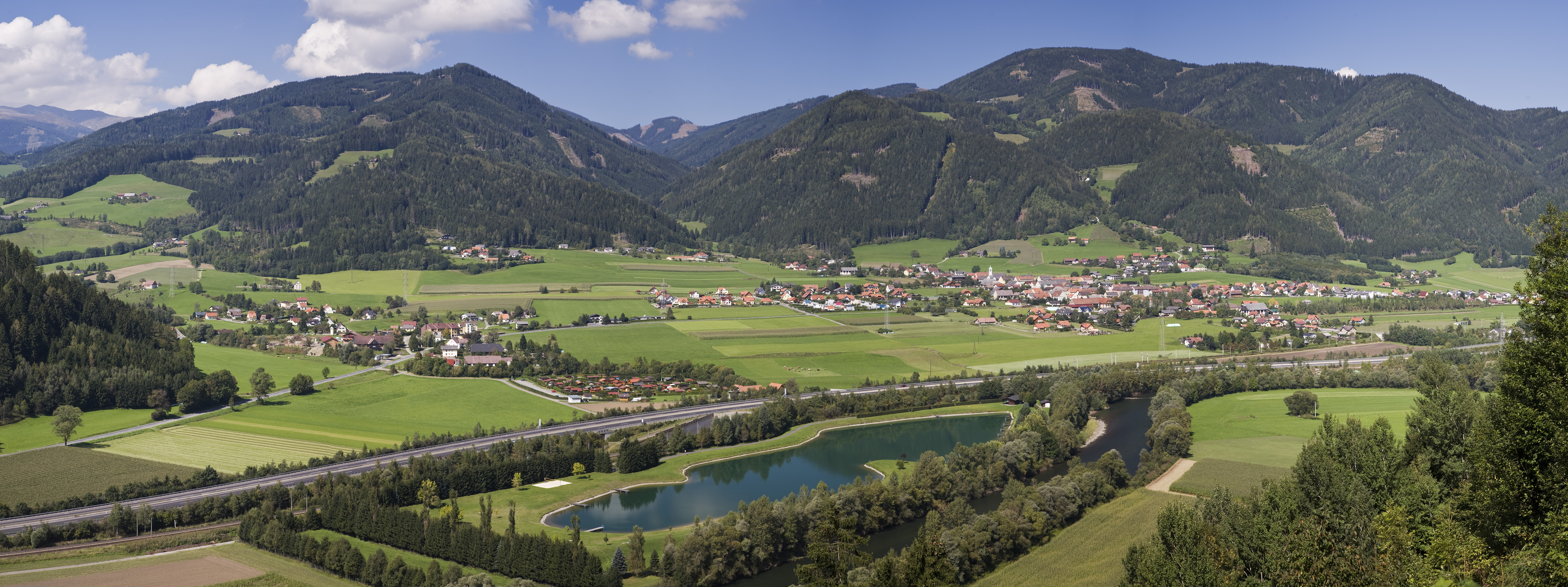
- View of Kraubath

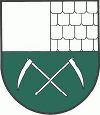
- Coat of arms

- Location within Austria Kraubath an der Mur (Austria)
- Coordinates: 47°18′00″N 14°55′48″E
- Country: Austria
- State: Styria
- District: Leoben

Government
  - Mayor: Erich Ofner (ÖVP)

Area
  - Total: 27.44 km^{2} (10.59 sq mi)
- Elevation: 632 m (2,073 ft)

Population (2018-01-01)
  - Total: 1,283
  - Density: 46.76/km^{2} (121.1/sq mi)
- Time zone: UTC+1 (CET)
  - Summer (DST): UTC+2 (CEST)
- Postal code: 8714
- Area code: 03832
- Vehicle registration: LN
- Website: www.kraubath.at

Kraubath an der Mur is a municipality in the district of Leoben in the Austrian state of Styria.

== Name ==
The name of this place is mentioned many times in the 11th-13th century charters and it is written regularly as "Chrowat" which is toponym variant of name "Croat".

== Geography ==
Kraubath an der Mur lies in the central Mur valley between Leoben and Knittelfeld.
