= Radmer =

- Municipality
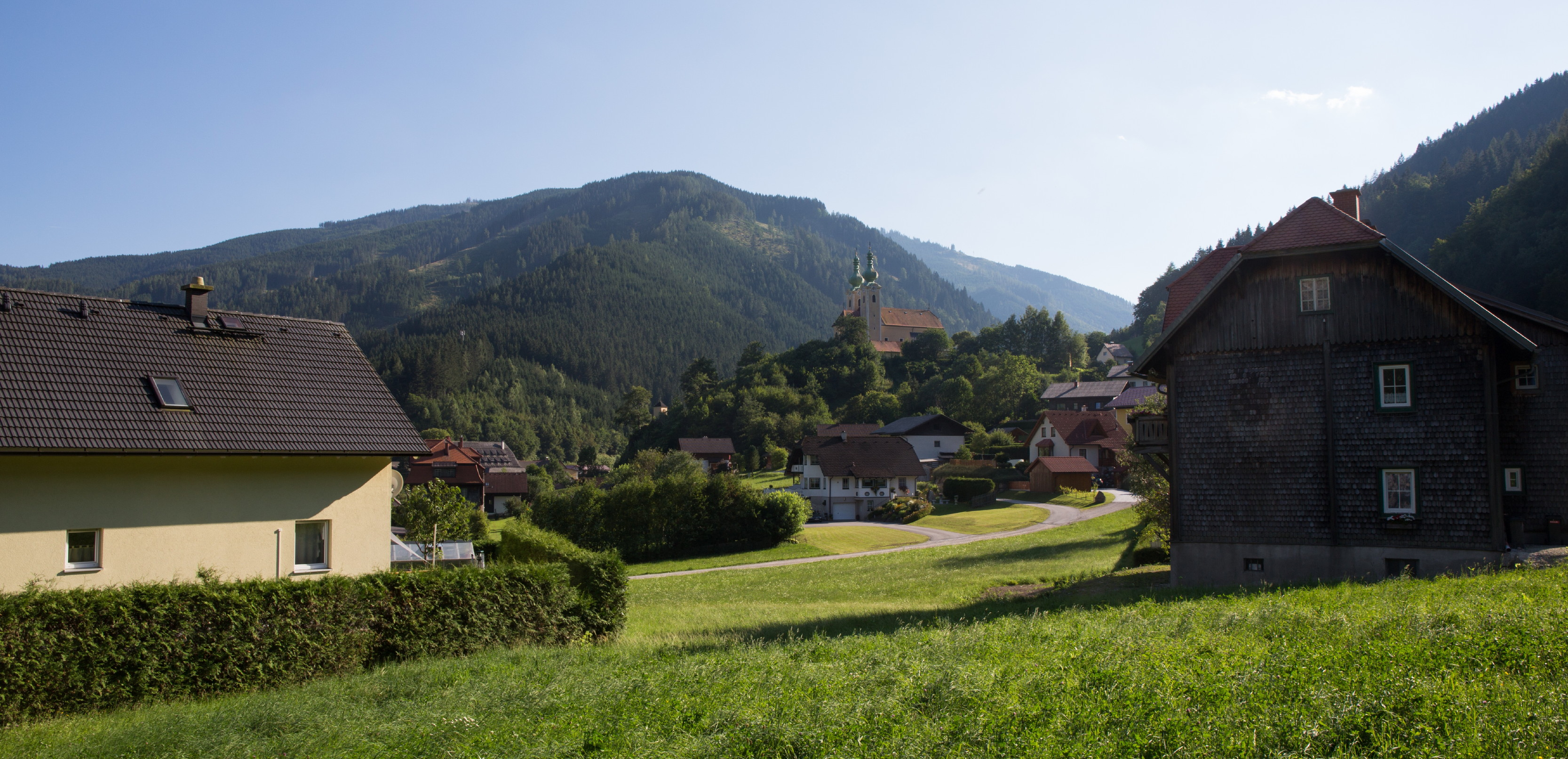

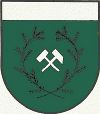
- Coat of arms

- Location within Austria
- Coordinates: 47°32′41″N 14°43′28″E
- Country: Austria
- State: Styria
- District: Leoben

Government
  - Mayor: Ludwig Gottsbacher (SPÖ)

Area
  - Total: 82.6 km^{2} (31.9 sq mi)
- Elevation: 729 m (2,392 ft)

Population (2018-01-01)
  - Total: 559
  - Density: 6.77/km^{2} (17.5/sq mi)
- Time zone: UTC+1 (CET)
  - Summer (DST): UTC+2 (CEST)
- Postal code: 8795
- Area code: 03635
- Vehicle registration: LN
- Website: www.radmer.at

Radmer is a municipality in the district of Leoben in Austrian state of Styria.

== Population ==
Historical population
Year	Pop.	±%
1869	882	—
1880	927	+5.1%
1890	937	+1.1%
1900	914	−2.5%
1910	908	−0.7%
1923	1,032	+13.7%
1934	904	−12.4%
1939	1,010	+11.7%
1951	986	−2.4%
1961	1,178	+19.5%
1971	1,160	−1.5%
1981	1,006	−13.3%
1991	903	−10.2%
2001	794	−12.1%
2011	678	−14.6%
2021	511	−24.6%

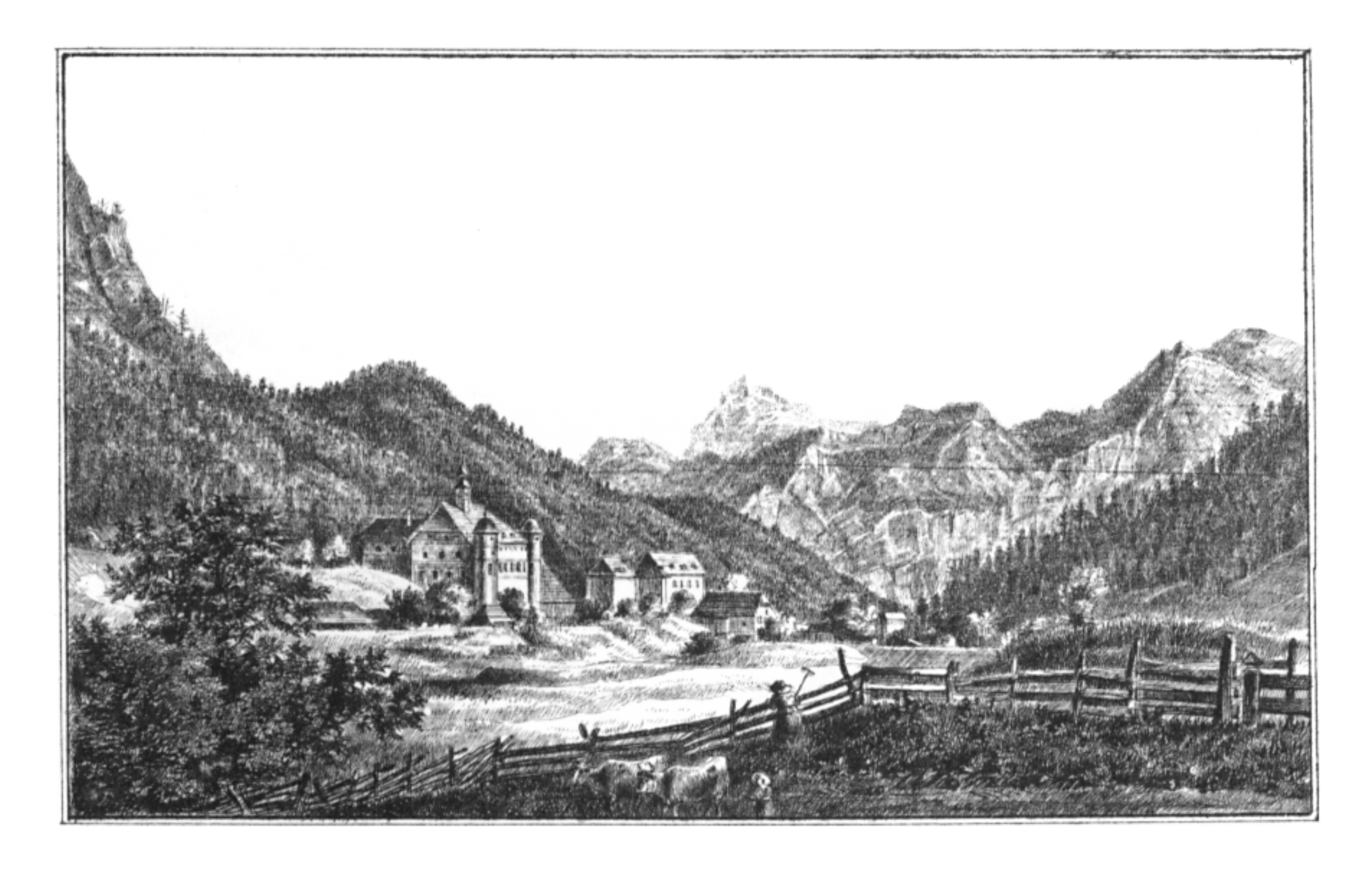
Castle Greifenberg, 1830, Lith. J.F. Kaiser, Graz
