= Prinzersdorf =

- Municipality
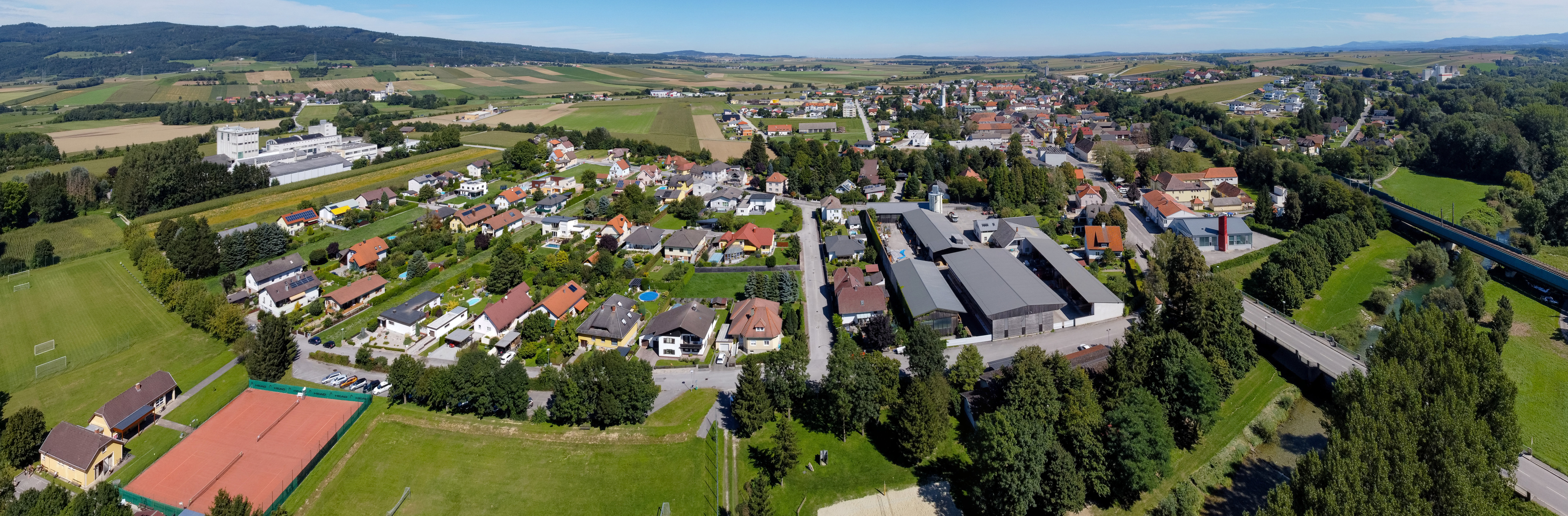
- Aerial view of Prinzersdorf

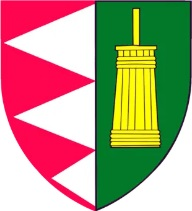
- Coat of arms

- Location within Austria
- Coordinates: 48°12′10″N 15°31′00″E
- Country: Austria
- State: Lower Austria
- District: Sankt Pölten-Land

Government
  - Mayor: Rudolf Schütz (ÖVP)

Area
  - Total: 4.06 km^{2} (1.57 sq mi)
- Elevation: 252 m (827 ft)

Population (2018-01-01)
  - Total: 1,617
  - Density: 398/km^{2} (1,030/sq mi)
- Time zone: UTC+1 (CET)
  - Summer (DST): UTC+2 (CEST)
- Postal code: 3385
- Area code: 02749
- Vehicle registration: PL
- Website: www.prinzersdorf.at

Prinzersdorf is a municipality in the district of Sankt Pölten-Land in the Austrian state of Lower Austria.

== Population ==
Historical population
Year	Pop.	±%
1971	1,113	—
1981	1,199	+7.7%
1991	1,306	+8.9%
2001	1,413	+8.2%
