= Traboch =

- Municipality
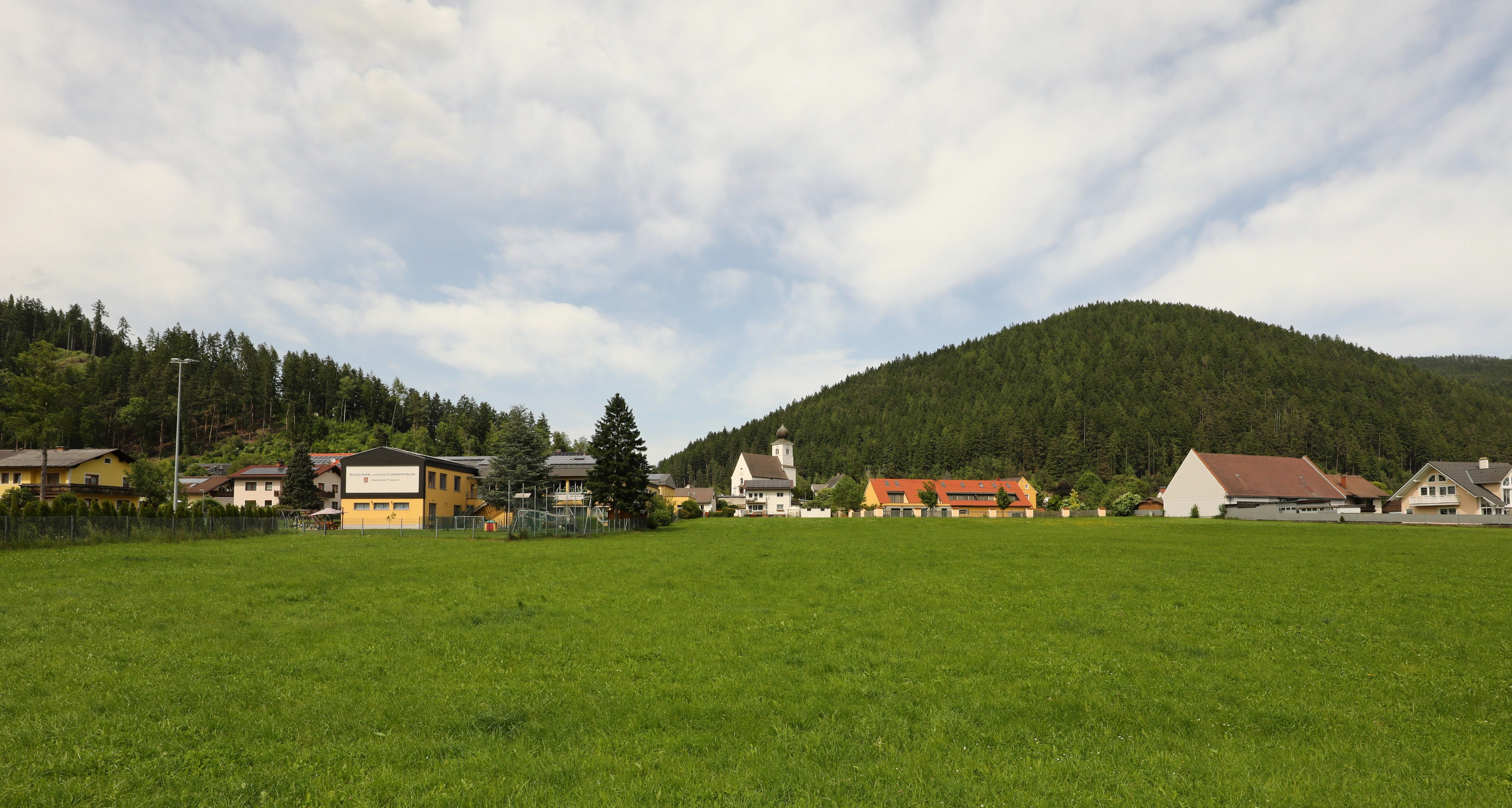

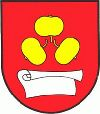
- Coat of arms

- Location within Austria
- Coordinates: 47°22′38″N 14°59′13″E
- Country: Austria
- State: Styria
- District: Leoben

Government
  - Mayor: Martin Schuchaneg (ÖVP)

Area
  - Total: 12.52 km^{2} (4.83 sq mi)
- Elevation: 622 m (2,041 ft)

Population (2018-01-01)
  - Total: 1,384
  - Density: 110.5/km^{2} (286.3/sq mi)
- Time zone: UTC+1 (CET)
  - Summer (DST): UTC+2 (CEST)
- Postal code: 8772
- Area code: 03833
- Vehicle registration: LN
- Website: www.traboch.at

Traboch is a municipality in the district of Leoben in the Austrian state of Styria.
