= Kalwang =

- Municipality
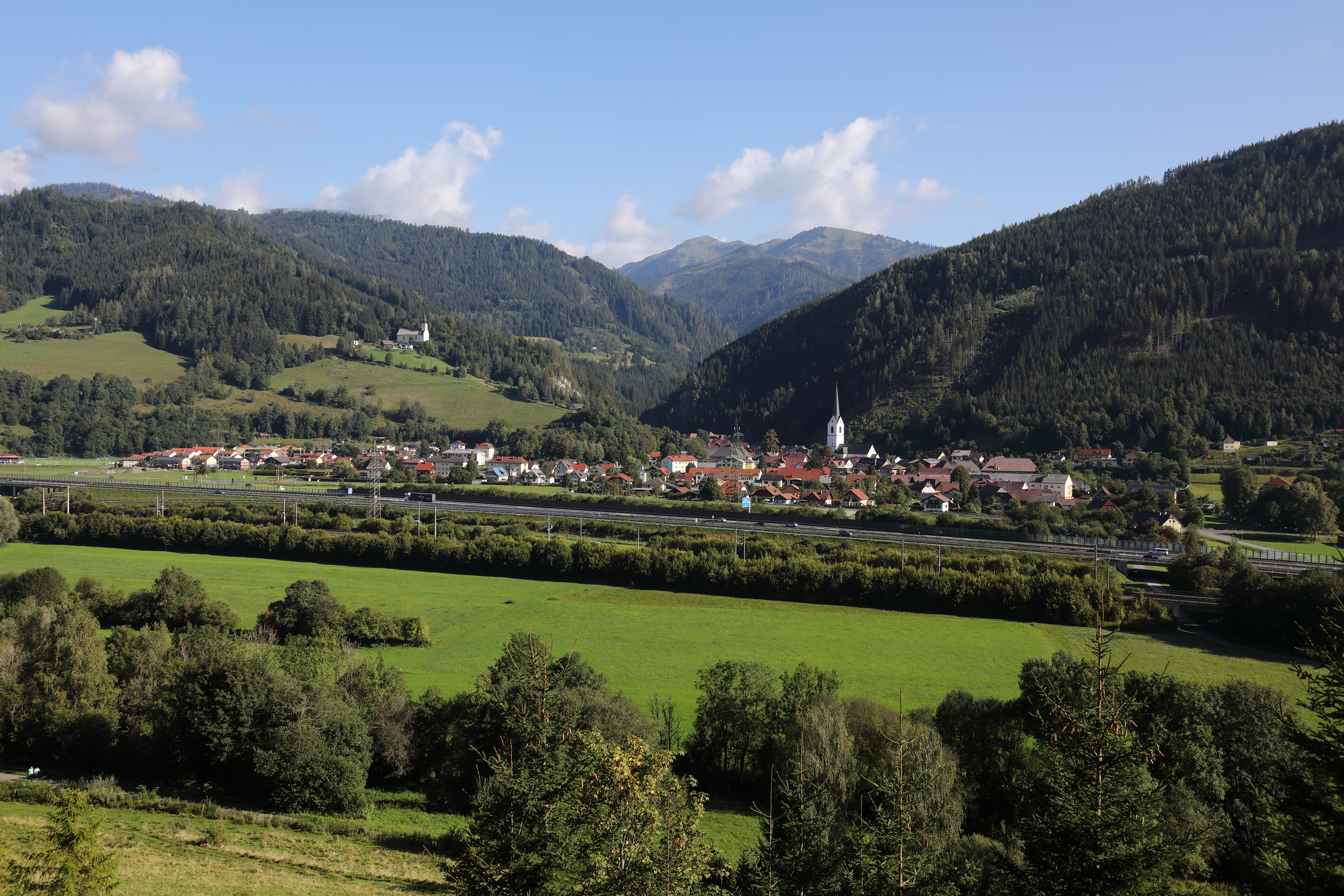

- Coat of arms

- Location within Austria
- Coordinates: 47°24′36″N 14°45′00″E
- Country: Austria
- State: Styria
- District: Leoben

Government
  - Mayor: Mario Angerer (ÖVP)

Area
  - Total: 67.16 km^{2} (25.93 sq mi)
- Elevation: 751 m (2,464 ft)

Population (2018-01-01)
  - Total: 987
  - Density: 14.7/km^{2} (38.1/sq mi)
- Time zone: UTC+1 (CET)
  - Summer (DST): UTC+2 (CEST)
- Postal code: 8775
- Area code: 03846
- Vehicle registration: LN
- Website: www.kalwang.at

Kalwang is a municipality in the district of Leoben in the Austrian state of Styria.

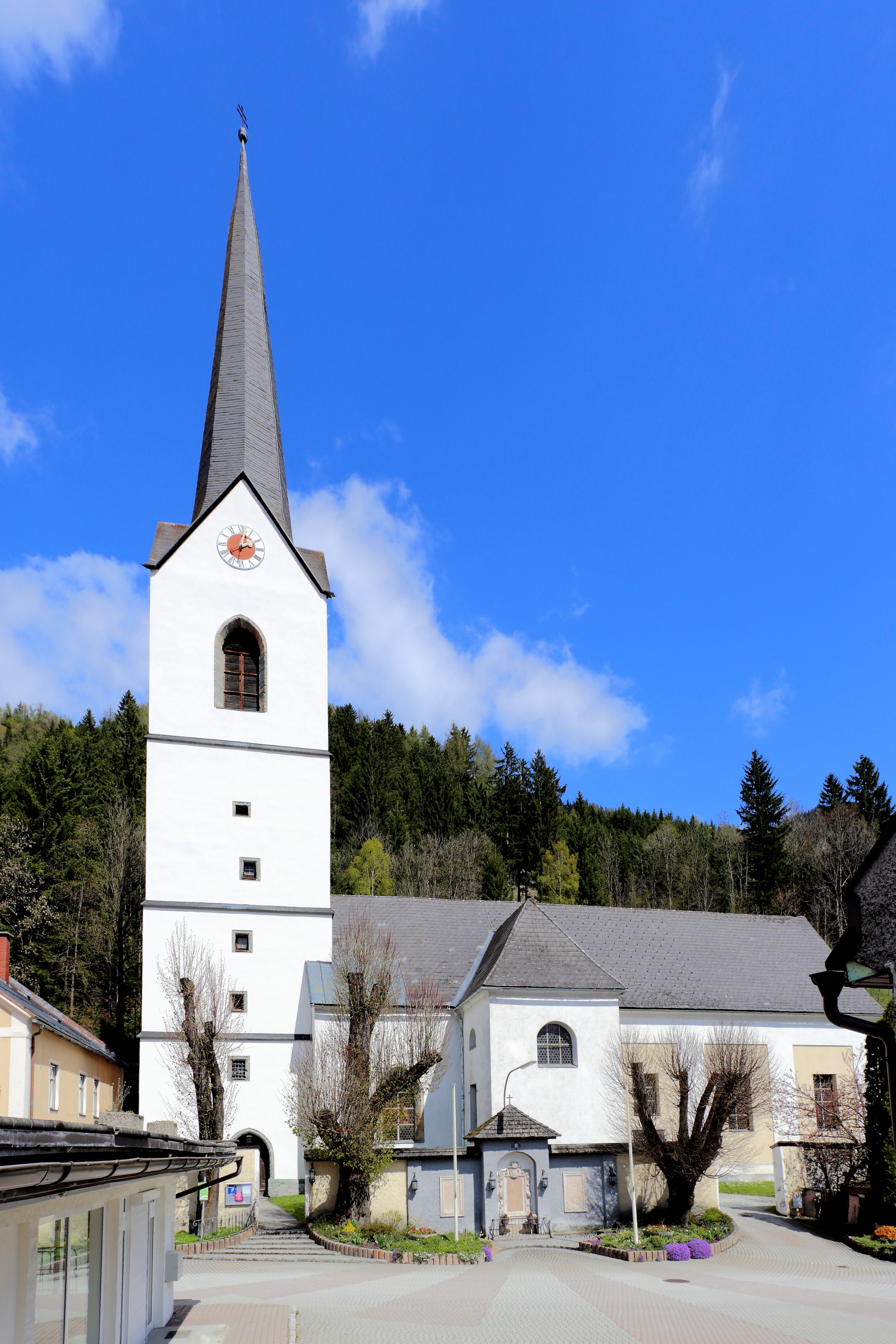
Parish church St. Oswald
