= Kammern im Liesingtal =

- Municipality
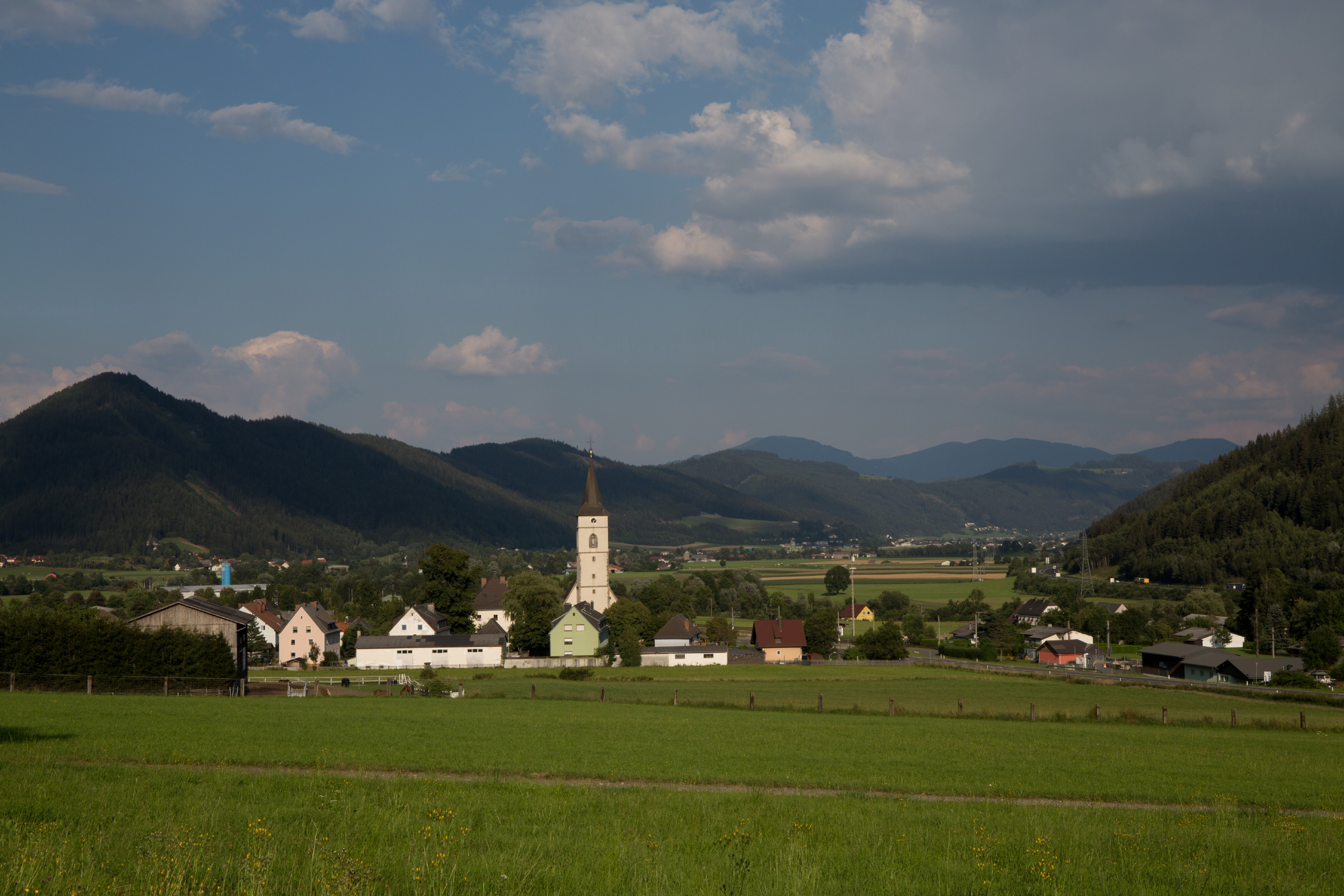

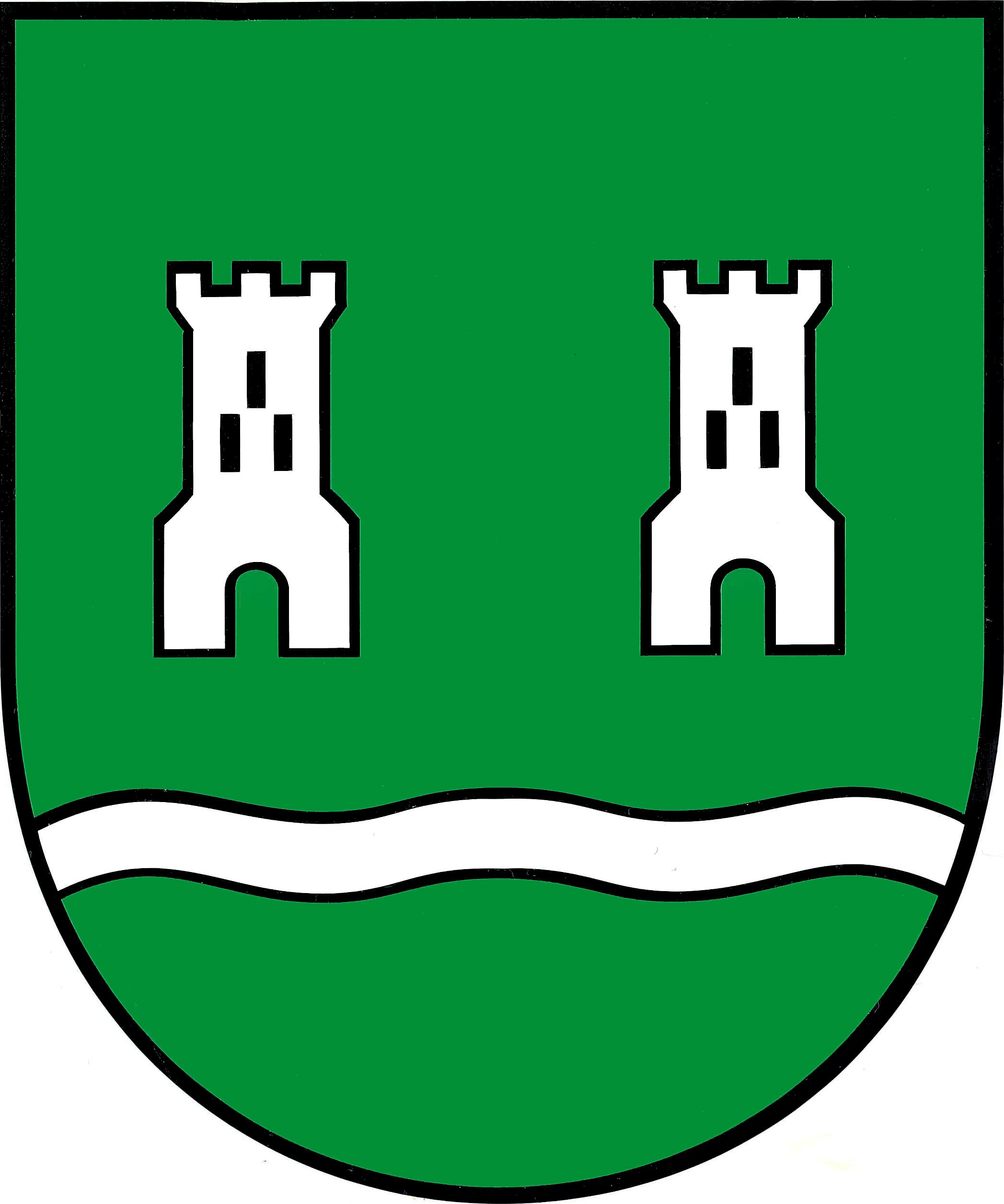
- Coat of arms

- Location within Austria
- Coordinates: 47°22′48″N 14°54′00″E
- Country: Austria
- State: Styria
- District: Leoben

Government
  - Mayor: Karl Dobnigg (SPÖ)

Area
  - Total: 58.86 km^{2} (22.73 sq mi)
- Elevation: 664 m (2,178 ft)

Population (2018-01-01)
  - Total: 1,600
  - Density: 27/km^{2} (70/sq mi)
- Time zone: UTC+1 (CET)
  - Summer (DST): UTC+2 (CEST)
- Postal code: 8772, 8773
- Area code: 03844
- Vehicle registration: LN
- Website: www.kammern-liesingtal.at

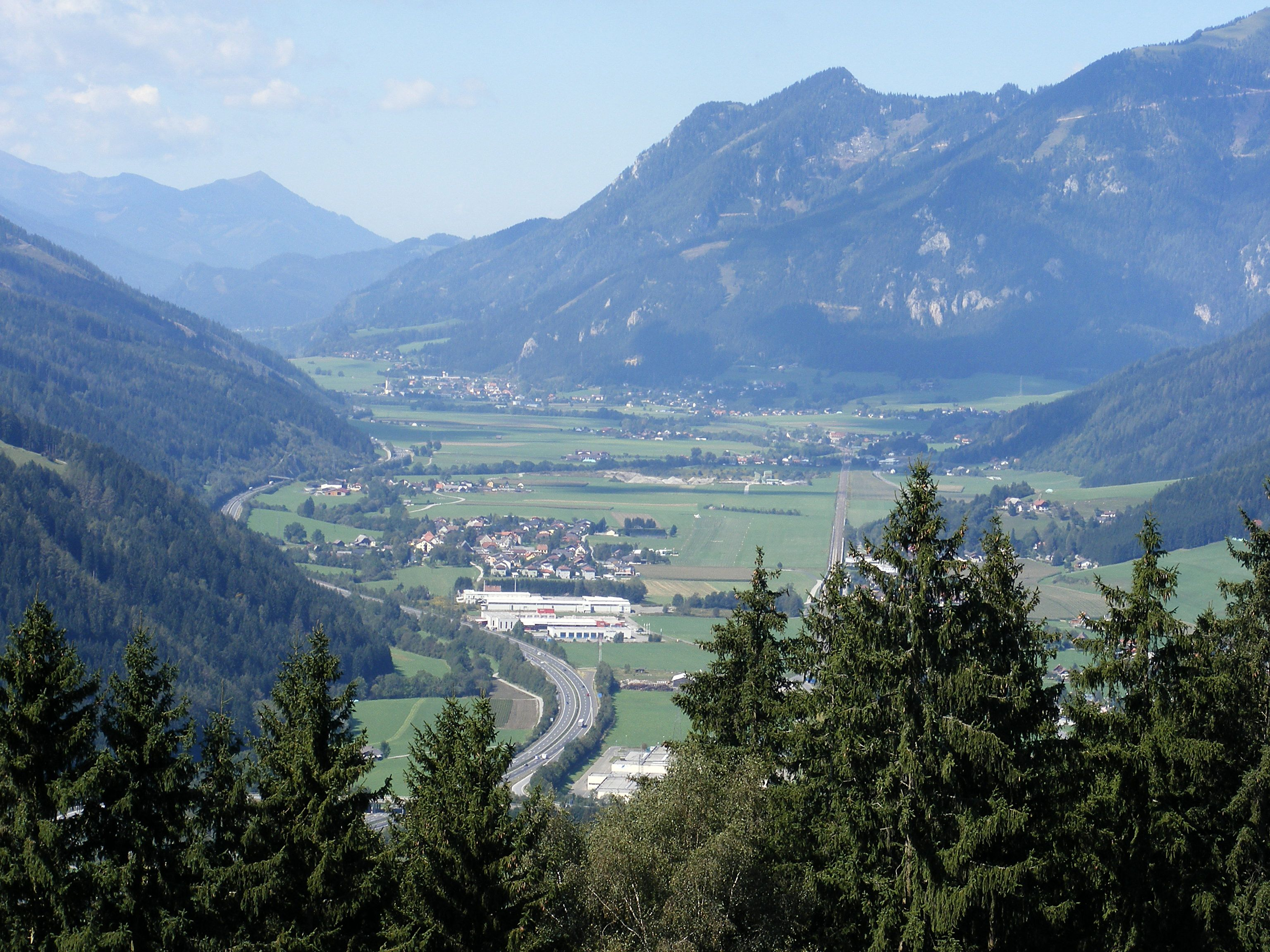
Lower valley

Kammern im Liesingtal is a municipality in the district of Leoben in the Austrian state of Styria.

== Geography ==
Kammern im Liesingtal lies in the Liesing valley in northeast Styria, in the center of upper Styria.
