= Josef Forster (composer) =

Austrian composer

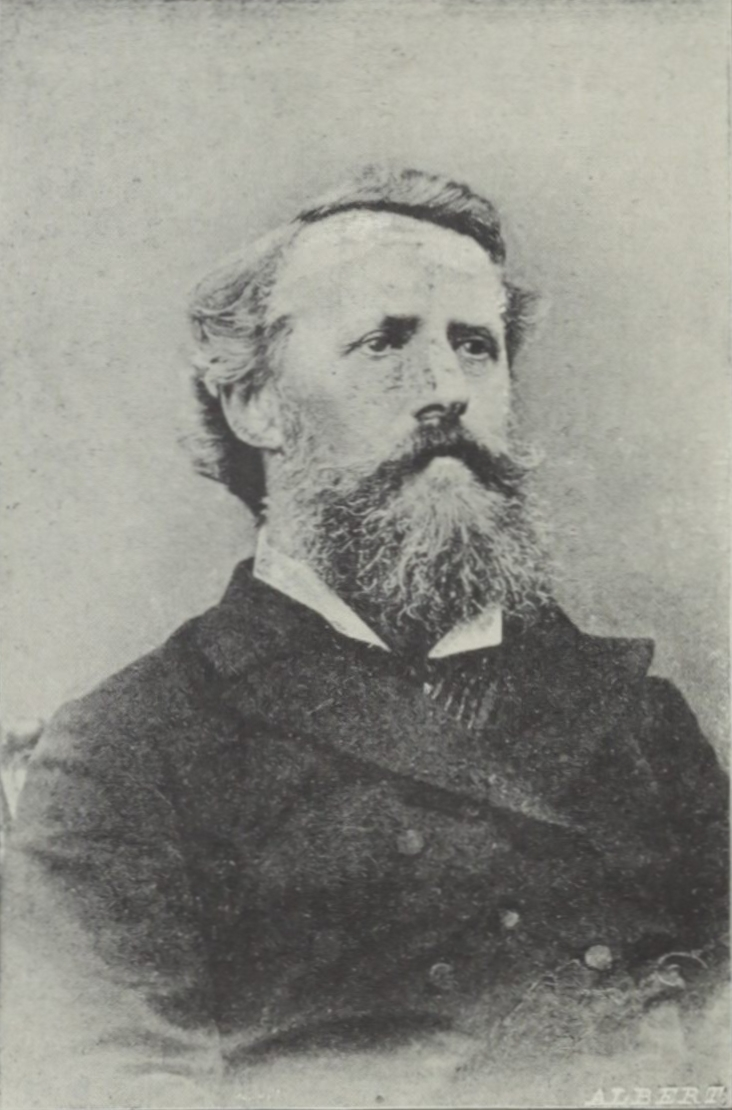
Josef Forster; photograph by Joseph Albert (1880s)

Josef Forster (20 January 1838 in Trofaiach – 23 March 1917 in Vienna) was an Austrian composer; known primarily for his operas and operettas.

== Biography ==
He was one of ten children born to Jakob Forster, an organist, and his wife Klara, the daughter of a choirmaster. After beginning his musical training at home, he became a choir boy at Admont Abbey, where he received further instruction from their organist, Franz Traunbauer (1775-1864). In 1854, he enrolled in the teacher training institute in Graz; followed by technical studies at the Joanneum (now the Graz University of Technology). It was during this time that he made his first attempts at composition; now lost. In 1865, he went to Vienna to study architecture, but soon gave up. To support himself, he worked as a private teacher. Forster also devised inventions which were not successful. He was, however, awarded several patents for optical devices, guns and engines.

With the support of Eduard Hanslick and Felix Otto Dessoff, he made his debut as a composer with two string quartets and a Symphony in C minor, performed in 1871 by the Vienna Philharmonic with Dessoff conducting. During the 1870s and 1880s, he premiered numerous operettas and ballets, notably The Assassins, inspired by a poem by Archduke Johann Salvator, who responded by giving Forster the Tuscan Knight's Cross for civil merit. Despite this, an application to be the Kapellmeister at the Burgtheater was not accepted.

His only major success was the one-act opera, The Rose of Pontevedra (1893), for which he won a first prize (a tie) from the Duchy of Saxe-Coburg and Gotha. It is considered one of the few quality verismo style operas in German and was performed regularly until 1914. His later works never became as popular. Der dot Mon (1902), based on a Fastnachtsspiel (burlesque) by Hans Sachs, failed, even though it received good reviews and was premiered at the Vienna State Opera with its director, Gustav Mahler, conducting.

In his later years, he developed an interest in mathematics and mistakenly believed that he had solved Fermat's Last Theorem. This resulted in a continuing argument with the committee in charge of awarding the Wolfskehl-Preis; worth 100,000 Goldmarks to anyone who could prove they had found a solution. His efforts were, predictably, futile. He died forgotten and poverty-stricken in 1917. Of his works, only a brief excerpt from Der dot Mon was ever recorded (in 1902, by the soprano, Margarete Michalek).

== Sources ==
- Alfred Seebacher-Mesaritsch: "Komponist und Erfinder". In: Trofaiach. Heimatbuch zur Stadterhebung. Graz 1979, pgs. 125–128.
- "Forster, Josef". In: Österreichisches Biographisches Lexikon 1815–1950 (ÖBL). Vol. 1, Austrian Academy of Sciences, Vienna 1957, p. 337 f. (Direct links to "p. 337", "p. 338")
- Oesterreichisches Musiklexikon. Vol.1. Verlag der Österreichischen Akademie der Wissenschaften, Vienna 2002, ISBN 3-7001-3043-0, pg.472.
