= Trofaiach =

- Municipality
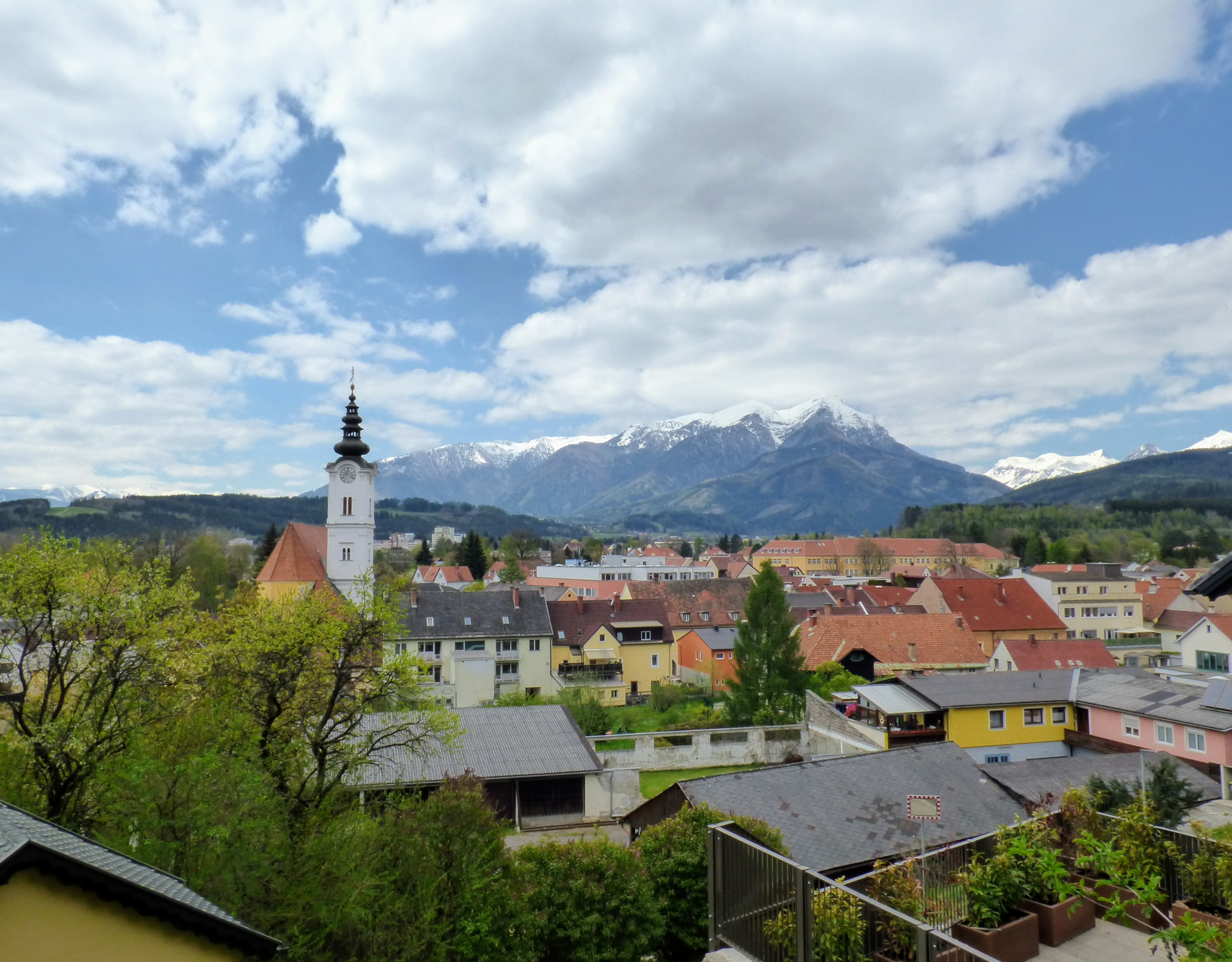
- Trofaiach

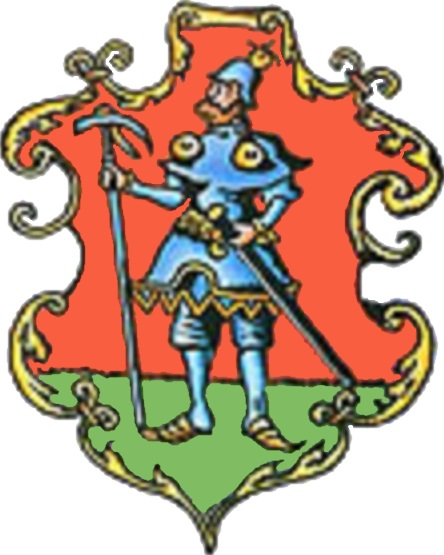
- Coat of arms

- Location within Austria
- Coordinates: 47°25′33.69″N 15°00′24.12″E
- Country: Austria
- State: Styria
- District: Leoben

Government
  - Mayor: Mario Abl (SPÖ)

Area
  - Total: 143.63 km^{2} (55.46 sq mi)
- Elevation: 658 m (2,159 ft)

Population (2018-01-01)
  - Total: 11,125
  - Density: 77.456/km^{2} (200.61/sq mi)
- Time zone: UTC+1 (CET)
  - Summer (DST): UTC+2 (CEST)
- Postal code: 8793
- Area code: +43 3847
- Vehicle registration: LN
- Website: https://www.trofaiach.gv.at/

Trofaiach is a municipality in the Leoben district of the state of Styria in Austria, the site of a post World War II British sector displaced persons camp. On 1 January 2013, it was merged with the neighbouring municipalities of Hafning bei Trofaiach and Gai. The municipality had 11,003 inhabitants on 1 January 2023.

== Sons and daughters of the town ==
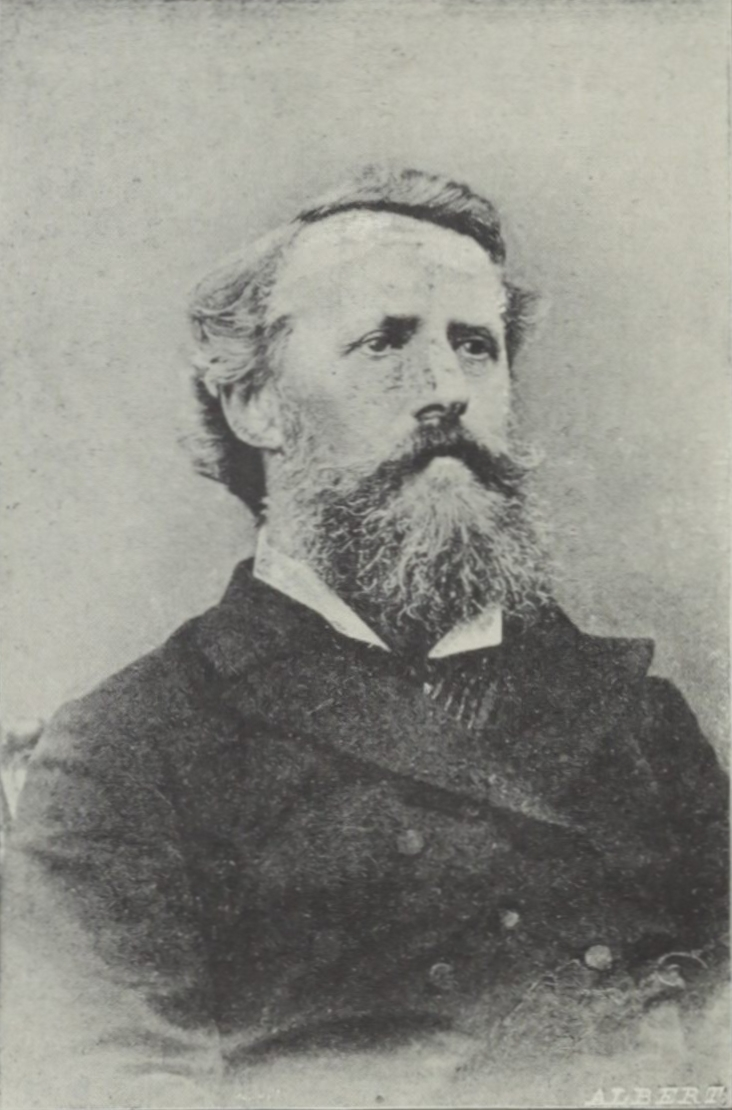
Josef Forster

- Josef Forster (1838-1917), composer, he wrote several, at that time successful, but now forgotten operas
- Hellmuth Stachel (born 1942), grew up in Trofaiach, Austrian mathematician and professor of geometry at the Vienna University of Technology.
- Hannes Arch (1967-2016), aerobatics pilot, first Austrian participant in the Red Bull Air Race Series
- Monika Maierhofer (born 1967), former ski racer
