= Niklasdorf =

- Municipality
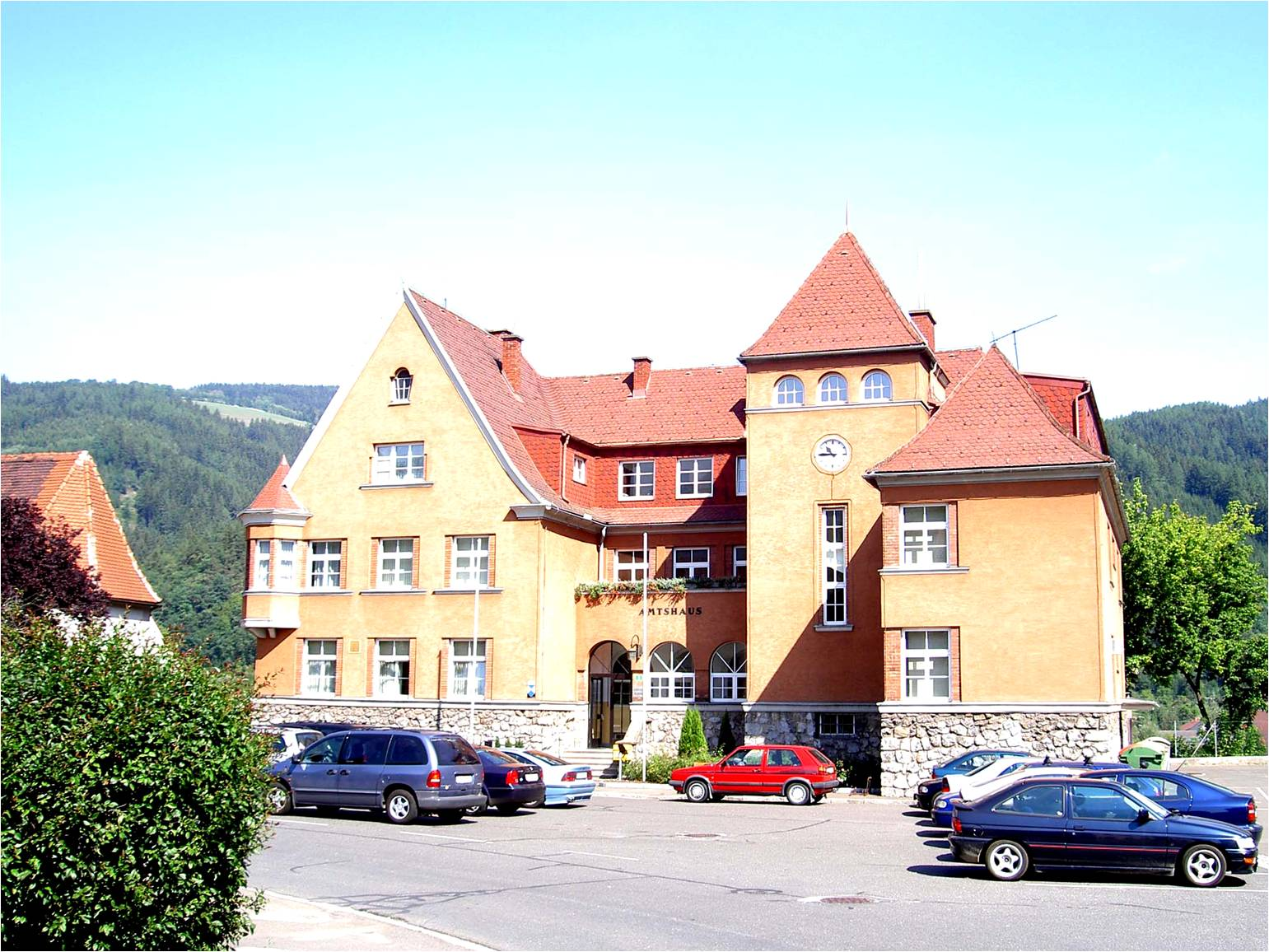
- Municipal office

- Coat of arms

- Location within Austria
- Coordinates: 47°25′00″N 15°10′00″E
- Country: Austria
- State: Styria
- District: Leoben

Government
  - Mayor: Johann Marak (SPÖ)

Area
  - Total: 15.19 km^{2} (5.86 sq mi)
- Elevation: 521 m (1,709 ft)

Population (2018-01-01)
  - Total: 2,515
  - Density: 165.6/km^{2} (428.8/sq mi)
- Time zone: UTC+1 (CET)
  - Summer (DST): UTC+2 (CEST)
- Postal code: 8712
- Area code: 03842
- Vehicle registration: LN
- Website: www.niklasdorf.info

Niklasdorf is a municipality in the district of Leoben in the Austrian state of Styria.

== Population ==
Historical population
Year	Pop.	±%
1869	541	—
1880	621	+14.8%
1890	785	+26.4%
1900	1,001	+27.5%
1910	1,481	+48.0%
1923	1,855	+25.3%
1934	2,444	+31.8%
1939	2,630	+7.6%
1951	3,180	+20.9%
1961	3,350	+5.3%
1971	3,365	+0.4%
1981	3,349	−0.5%
1991	2,987	−10.8%
2001	2,697	−9.7%
2011	2,549	−5.5%
2021	2,365	−7.2%
