= Hellmuth Stachel =

Austrian mathematician (born 1942)

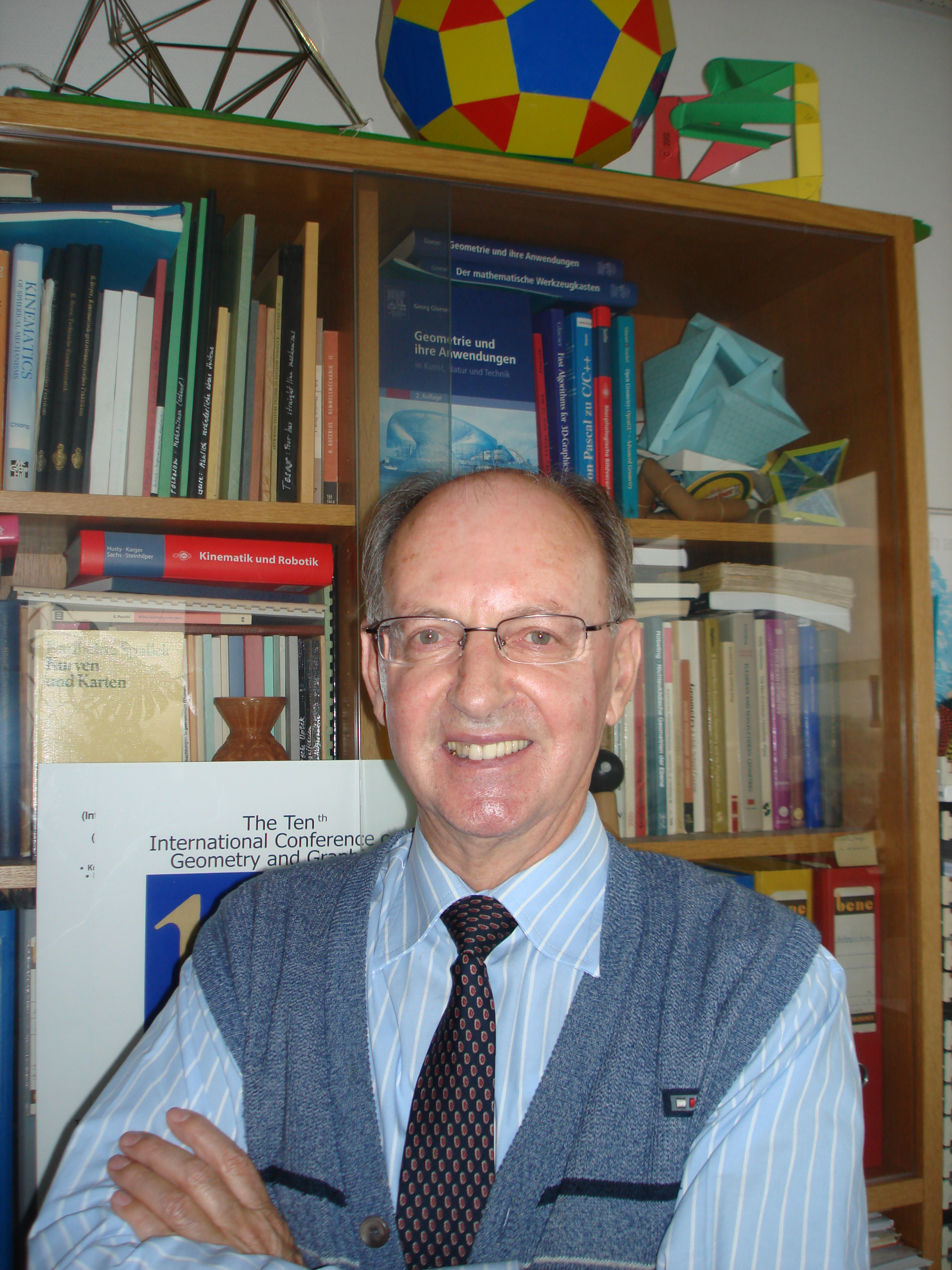
- Born: October 6, 1942 (age 83); Graz, Styria, Austria
- Citizenship: Austria
- Education: University of Graz, Graz University of Technology
- Scientific career
- Fields: Mathematics
- Workplaces: University of Graz, Technical University of Vienna
- Doctoral advisor: Fritz Hohenberg

Hellmuth Stachel (born October 6, 1942, in Graz, Austria) is an Austrian mathematician, a professor of geometry at the Technical University of Vienna, who is known due to his contributions to geometry, kinematics and computer-aided design.

== Biography ==
Stachel was born on October 6, 1942, in Graz to the family of primary school teachers. He graduated from an elementary school in Trofaiach and secondary school (gymnasium) in Leoben. In 1965 he graduated from the University of Graz and Graz University of Technology, obtaining a diploma of a school teacher in “mathematics” and “descriptive geometry.” As a Ph.D. student of Graz University he majored in “mathematics, astronomy and philosophy.” His doctoral advisor was Professor Fritz Hohenberg. Hellmuth Stachel obtained his doctorate in 1969 from Graz University and passed thought habilitation in 1971 at the Technical University of Graz. In 1980 he moved to the Vienna University of Technology.

Stachel held several visiting positions in China: in August 1984 he was a visiting professor at South China University of Technology in Guangzhou and, in October 1989, at Tongji University in Shanghai.

Stachel takes an active part in the work of “International Society for Geometry and Graphics” (ISGG). In 1990 he was elected a chairman and, in 1994, a vice-president of the society. In 1996 he has created the scientific journal Journal for Geometry and Graphics and since then serves it as the Editor-in-Chief.

== Research ==
Stachel wrote three books (in cooperation with other scholars) and approximately 120 scientific articles on classical and descriptive geometry, kinematics and the theory of mechanisms, as well as on computer aided design. He studied flexible polyhedra in the 4-dimensional Euclidean space and 3-dimensional Lobachevsky space.

== Awards and prizes ==
In 1991 Stachel was elected a corresponding member of the Austrian Academy of Sciences. In 1993 he received the “German-Austrian University-Software Award” for the development of educational Cad-3D programs. In 2004 he received The Steve M. Slaby Award. On November, 1st 2010 Hellmuth Stachel received an honorary doctorate from the Dresden University of Technology.

== Books ==
- G. Glaeser and H. Stachel. Open Geometry: OpenGL + Advanced Geometry. Springer: New York, 1999, 392 p. ISBN 978-0-387-98599-2.
- T. Arens, F. Hettlich, Ch. Karpfinger, U. Kockelkorn, K. Lichtenegger, and H. Stachel. Mathematik, 1.Aufl. Spektrum: Heidelberg, 2008, 1500 p. ISBN 978-3-8274-1758-9.
- T. Arens, F. Hettlich, Ch. Karpfinger, U. Kockelkorn, K. Lichtenegger, and H. Stachel. Arbeitsbuch Mathematik. Spektrum: Heidelberg, 2009, 683 p. ISBN 978-3-8274-2123-4.
- G. Glaeser, H. Stachel and B. Odehnal. The Universe of Conics: From the ancient Greeks to 21st century developments. Springer Spektrum: Heidelberg, 1st ed. 2016, 488 p. ISBN 9-783-6624-5449-7.
- B. Odehnal, G. Glaeser and H. Stachel. The Universe of Quadrics. Springer: NY, 1st ed. 2020, 600 p. ISBN 978-3-662-61052-7

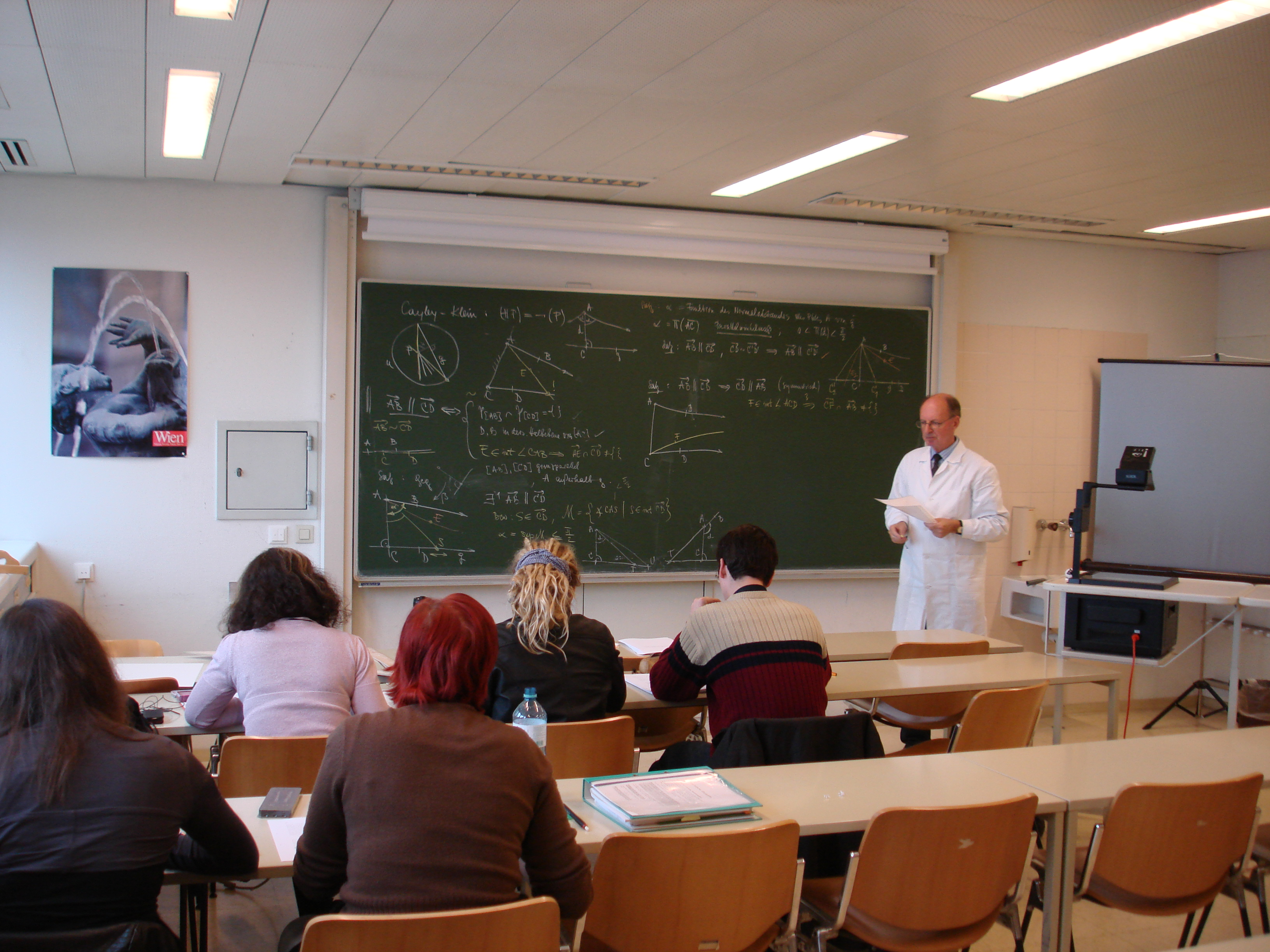
Professor Hellmuth Stachel delivers a lecture on Non-Euclidean Geometry at Vienna University of Technology on November 17, 2009

== Articles on flexible polyhedra ==
- H. Stachel. Flexible octahedra in the hyperbolic space. In the book: Non-Euclidean geometries. János Bolyai memorial volume (Eds. A. Prékopa et al.). New York: Springer. Mathematics and its Applications (Springer) 581, 209–225 (2006). ISBN 978-0-387-29554-1.
- H. Stachel. Flexible cross-polytopes in the Euclidean 4-space. J. Geom. Graph. 4, No.2, 159–167 (2000). ISSN 1433-8157.
- H. Stachel. Higher order flexibility of octahedra. Period. Math. Hung. 39, No.1–3, 225–240 (1999). ISSN 0031-5303.
