= Sankt Michael in Obersteiermark =

- Municipality
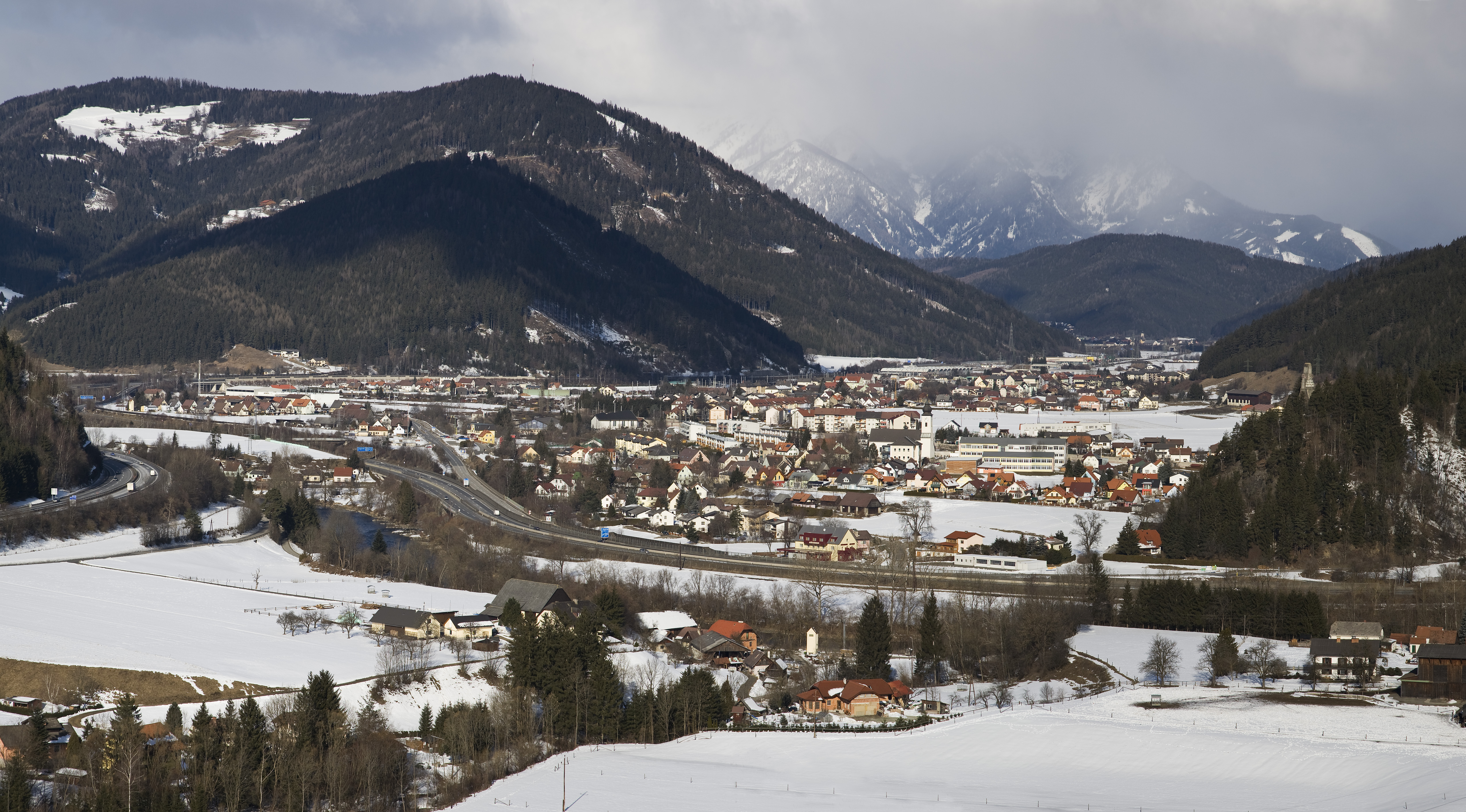

- Coat of arms

- Location within Austria
- Coordinates: 47°20′19″N 15°01′06″E
- Country: Austria
- State: Styria
- District: Leoben

Government
  - Mayor: Heinz Jungwirth (SPÖ)

Area
  - Total: 56.09 km^{2} (21.66 sq mi)
- Elevation: 596 m (1,955 ft)

Population (2018-01-01)
  - Total: 3,060
  - Density: 54.6/km^{2} (141/sq mi)
- Time zone: UTC+1 (CET)
  - Summer (DST): UTC+2 (CEST)
- Postal code: 8770
- Area code: 03843
- Vehicle registration: LN
- Website: www.st-michael.steiermark.at

Sankt Michael in Obersteiermark is a municipality in the district of Leoben in the Austrian state of Styria.
