= Gemmersdorf =

Village in Austria

Coordinates: 46°45′N 14°55′E

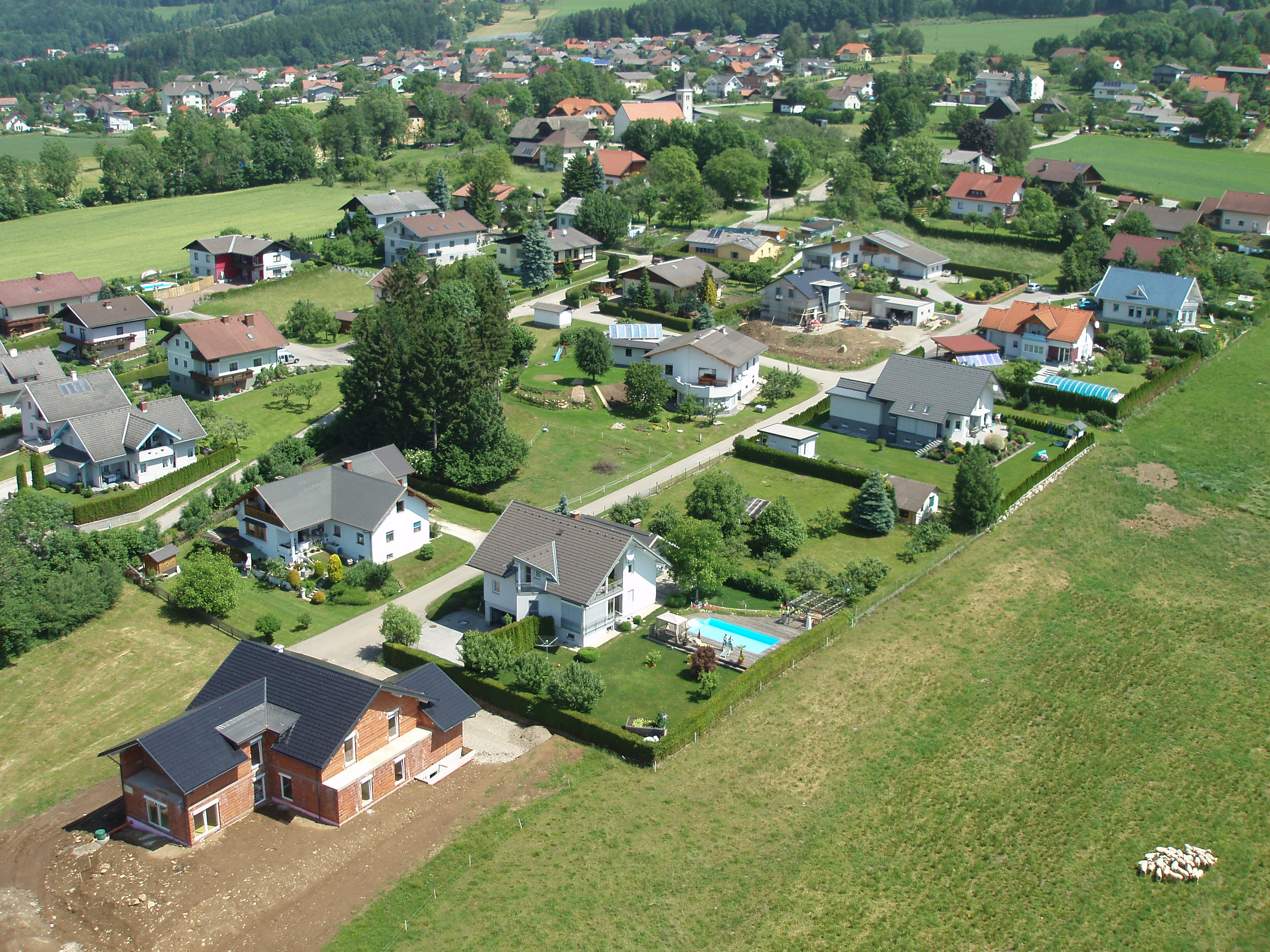
View from the south of Gemmersdorf

Gemmersdorf is a village in Austria with 687 inhabitants and is a district of the municipality Sankt Andrä. It's situated on the Gemmersdorfer Straße at the foot of Koralpe, six kilometres east of Sankt Andrä.

== Public Institutions ==
- Local Fire Brigade Gemmersdorf
- Chapel of ease Gemmersdorf
