= Rannach =

River in Germany

Location
- Country: Germany
- State: Bavaria

Physical characteristics
- Mouth
  - location: Aisch
  - coordinates: 49.4936°N 10.4042°E
- Length: 12.7 km (7.9 mi)

Basin features
- Progression: Aisch→ Regnitz→ Main→ Rhine→ North Sea

Rannach is a river in Bavaria, Germany. It flows into the Aisch in Bad Windsheim.

== See also ==
- List of rivers of Bavaria
