= Telephone numbers in Austria =

- The area code zones approximately follow the boundaries of the states, but Burgenland, Vorarlberg, Eastern Tyrol and the western part of Lower Austria are assigned to other areas.
- Country: Austria
- Continent: Europe
- Regulator: RTR
- Numbering plan type: open
- Format: (0x…) xx…
- Country code: +43
- International access: 00
- Long-distance: 0

Telephone numbers in Austria have no standard lengths for either area codes or subscriber numbers, meaning that some subscriber numbers may be as short as three digits. Larger towns have shorter area codes permitting longer subscriber numbers in that area.

== Examples of lengths of telephone numbers ==
Prefix	Service type
00	International call prefix
112	General emergency number
118 xxx	Directory assistance services
122	Fire brigade
133	Police
140	Mountain rescue
144	Ambulance
147	Telephone counselling for children (Rat auf Draht)
15xx	General information services (time etc.)
0718	Internet dial-up numbers
0720	Location independent landline numbers
0780	Convergent services with ENUM (VoIP)
0800	National free call
00800	International free call
0804	Internet dial-up numbers
08xx	Service numbers
09xx	Premium rate

== Area codes ==
Prefix code with 0 when dialed within Austria:

City	Code
Abfaltersbach	4846
Absdorf	2278
Abtenau	6243
Hochburg-Ach	7727
Achenkirch	5246
Admont	3613
Aflenz	3861
Afritz am See	4247
Aggsbach	2712
Aigen im Mühlkreis	7281
Ainet	4853
Alberschwende	5579
Alkoven	7274
Alland	2258
Allentsteig	2824
Alpbach	5336
Altenberg bei Linz	7230
Yspertal	7415
Altenmarkt an der Triesting	2673
Altheim	7723
Ampflwang im Hausruckwald	7675
Amstetten	7472
Andorf	7766
Andrichsfurt	7750
Anger	3175
Angern an der March	2283
Annaberg-Lungötz	6463
Anthering	6223
Antiesenhofen	7759
Apetlon	2175
Arbesbach	2813
Ardagger	7479
Arnfels	3455
Arnoldstein	4255
Aschach an der Donau	7273
Aschbach-Markt	7476
Aspangberg-Sankt Peter	2642
Asparn an der Zaya	2577
Assling	4855
Attersee am Attersee	7666
Attnang-Puchheim	7674
Atzenbrugg	2275
Tamsweg	6470
Au	5515
Auersthal	2288
Außerfragant	4785
Außervillgraten	4843
Axams	5234
Bad Aussee	3622
Bad Bleiberg	4244
Bad Fischau	2639
Bad Gastein	6434
Bad Gleichenberg	3159
Bad Goisern	6135
Bad Großpertholz	2857
Bad Hall	7258
Bad Hofgastein	6432
Bad Ischl	6132
Bad Kleinkirchheim	4240
Bad Kreuzen	7266
Bad Leonfelden	7213
Bad Mitterndorf	3623
Bad Radkersburg	3476
Bad Sankt Leonhard im Lavanttal	4350
Bad Sauerbrunn	2625
Bad Schallerbach	7249
Bad Traunstein	2878
Bad Zell	7263
Baden	2252
Baumgartenberg	7269
Berndorf	2672
Bernhardsthal	2557
Bernstein im Burgenland	3354
Bezau	5514
Bichlbach	5674
Birkfeld	3174
Bischoffeld	3513
Bischofshofen	6462
Bleiburg	4235
Blindenmarkt	7473
Bludenz	5552
Bodensdorf	4243
Böheimkirchen	2743
Bramberg am Wildkogel	6566
Brand	5559
Brandenberg	5331
Brand-Nagelberg	2859
Braunau am Inn	7722
Bregenz	5574
Breitenau am Hochlantsch	3866
Breitenfurt bei Wien	2239
Bretstein	3576
Brixlegg	5337
Bruck an der Großglocknerstraße	6545
Bruck an der Leitha	2162
Bruck an der Mur	3862
Brückl	4214
Brunn an der Wild	2989
Burgau	3383
Dalaas	5585
Damüls	5510
Dellach (Gailtal)	4718
Dellach im Drautal	4714
Deutsch-Brodersdorf	2255
Deutsch Goritz	3474
Deutsch Jahrndorf	2144
Deutsch Schützen-Eisenberg	3365
Deutsch-Wagram	2247
Deutschkreutz	2613
Deutschlandsberg	3462
Dienten am Hochkönig	6461
Dobersberg	2843
Dobl	3136
Donnersbach	3683
Donnersbachwald	3680
Doren	5516
Dorfgastein	6433
Dornbirn	5572
Draßburg	2686
Draßmarkt	2617
Drosendorf-Zissersdorf	2915
Drösing	2536
Droß	2719
Dürnstein	2711
Ebbs	5373
Ebene Reichenau	4275
Ebenfurth	2624
Ebensee	6133
Eberau	3323
Eberndorf	4236
Eberschwang	7753
Ebreichsdorf	2254
Edelschrott	3145
Eferding	7272
Egg	5512
Eggelsberg	7748
Eggenburg	2984
Eggerding	7767
Eggern	2863
Eggersdorf bei Graz	3117
Ehrenhausen	3453
Ehrwald	5673
Eibiswald	3466
Eichgraben	2773
Eisenerz	3848
Eisenkappel-Vellach	4238
Eisenstadt	2682
Elbigenalp	5634
Ellmau	5358
Elmen	5635
Els	2876
Enns	7223
Enzersdorf an der Fischa	2230
Ernstbrunn	2576
Esternberg	7714
Eugendorf	6225
Euratsfeld	7474
Faak am See	4254
Faistenau	6228
Fehring	3155
Feichten	5475
Feistritz an der Drau	4245
Feistritz im Rosental	4228
Feldbach	3152
Feldkirch	5522
Feldkirchen an der Donau	7233
Feldkirchen in Kärnten	4276
Felixdorf	2628
Fels am Wagram	2738
Ferlach	4227
Fieberbrunn	5354
Filzmoos	6453
Fischamend	2232
Fischbach	3170
Flachau	6457
Flattnitz	4269
Fließ	5449
Flinsbach	2741
Flirsch	5447
Fohnsdorf	3573
Frankenburg am Hausruck	7683
Frankenfels	2725
Frankenmarkt	7684
Frauenkirchen	2172
Freistadt	7942
Fresing	3456
Friedberg	3339
Friedburg	7746
Friesach	4268
Frohnleiten	3126
Fügen	5288
Fulpmes	5225
Fürnitz	4257
Fürstenfeld	3382
Fusch an der Großglocknerstraße	6546
Fuschl am See	6226
Gaaden	2237
Gaflenz	7353
Gaishorn am See	3617
Gallizien	4221
Gallneukirchen	7235
Galtür	5443
Gaming	7485
Gams bei Hieflau	3637
Gansbach	2753
Gänserndorf	2282
Gars am Kamp	2985
Gaschurn	5558
Gasen	3171
Gaspoltshofen	7735
Gattendorf	2142
Gaweinstal	2574
Geistthal	3149
Gemmersdorf	4355
Geras	2912
Gerasdorf bei Wien	2246
Gerlos	5284
Gföhl	2716
Ginzling	5285
Glanegg	4277
Gleinstätten	3457
Gleisdorf	3112
Globasnitz	4230
Gloggnitz	2662
Gmünd	2852
Gmünd in Kärnten	4732
Gmunden	7612
Gnadendorf	2525
Gnas	3151
Gnesau	4278
Göllersdorf	2954
Golling an der Salzach	6244
Gols	2173
Göpfritz an der Wild	2825
Göriach	6483
Gosau	6136
Göstling an der Ybbs	7484
Götzis	5523
Grafenschlag	2875
Grafenstein	4225
Grainbrunn	2877
Gramatneusiedl	2234
Gratkorn	3124
Graz	316
Greifenburg	4712
Grein	7268
Greith	3885
Gresten	7487
Gries am Brenner	5274
Gries im Sellrain	5236
Grieskirchen	7248
Griffen	4233
Grimmenstein	2644
Gröbming	3685
Grödig	6246
Groß Gerungs	2812
Groß Sankt Florian	3464
Großarl	6414
Groß-Enzersdorf	2249
Großglobnitz	2823
Großgmain	6247
Großkirchheim	4825
Großkrut	2556
Großmugl	2268
Großpetersdorf	3362
Großraming	7254
Großrußbach	2263
Großschönau	2815
Groß-Siegharts	2847
Großsteinbach	3386
Großtraberg	7218
Großweikersdorf	2955
Grünau im Almtal	7616
Grünbach am Schneeberg	2637
Grünburg	7257
Gschnitz	5276
Gummern	4245
Gunskirchen	7246
Guntersdorf	2951
Gurten	7757
Güssing	3322
Gutau	7946
Gutenstein	2634
Haag	7434
Haag am Hausruck	7732
Hadersdorf am Kamp	2735
Hägerau	5633
Haibach ob der Donau	7279
Hainburg a.d. Donau	2165
Hainfeld	2764
Hall in Tirol	5223
Hallein	6245
Hallstatt	6134
Hannersdorf	3364
Hargelsberg	7225
Hartberg	3332
Haugsdorf	2944
Haus	3686
Hausleiten	2265
Häusling	5289
Hausmening	7475
Heidenreichstein	2862
Heiligenblut am Großglockner	4824
Heiligenkreuz am Waasen	3134
Heiligenkreuz im Lafnitztal	3325
Helfenberg	7216
Hellmonsödt	7215
Henndorf am Wallersee	6214
Hermagor-Pressegger See	4282
Herrnbaumgarten	2555
Herzogenburg	2782
Herzogsdorf	7231
Hieflau	3634
Hinterriß	5245
Hintersee	6224
Hinterstoder	7564
Hirschbach im Mühlkreis	7948
Hirschegg	3141
Hittisau	5513
Hochfilzen	5359
Hochfügen	5280
Hochneukirchen	2648
Höchst	5578
Hof bei Salzburg	6229
Hofkirchen an der Trattnach	7734
Hofkirchen im Mühlkreis	7285
Hohenau an der March	2535
Hohenberg	2767
Hohenems	5576
Hohentauern	3618
Hohenwarth-Mühlbach am Manhartsberg	2957
Hollabrunn	2952
Hollenstein an der Ybbs	7445
Hopfgarten im Brixental	5335
Hörbranz	5573
Horitschon	2610
Horn	2982
Hornstein	2689
Hörsching	7221
Hötzelsdorf	2913
Huben	4872
Hürth	3475
Hüttau	6458
Hüttenberg	4263
Hüttschlag	6417
Idolsberg	2731
Ilz	3385
Imst	5412
Innerkrems	4736
Neustift-Innermanzing	2774
Innsbruck	512
Irnfritz	2986
Ischgl	5444
Japons	2914
Jenbach	5244
Jennersdorf	3329
Jochberg	5355
Johnsbach	3611
Jois	2160
Judenburg	3572
Jungholz	5676
Kainach bei Voitsberg	3148
Kaindorf	3334
Kals am Großglockner	4876
Kalsdorf bei Graz	3135
Kaltenbach	5283
Kaltenleutgeben	2238
Kalwang	3846
Kammern im Liesingtal	3844
Kapfenstein	3157
Kappl	5445
Kaprun	6547
Karlstein an der Thaya	2844
Karlstift	2816
Kartitsch	4848
Kasten bei Böheimkirchen	2744
Katsch an der Mur	3588
Kaumberg	2765
Kautendorf	2524
Kautzen	2864
Kefermarkt	7947
Kematen am Innbach	7247
Kematen an der Krems	7228
Kematen an der Ybbs	7448
Kematen in Tirol	5232
Kilb	2748
Kindberg	3865
Kirchbach	4284
Kirchbach in der Steiermark	3116
Kirchberg am Wagram	2279
Kirchberg am Walde	2854
Kirchberg am Wechsel	2641
Kirchberg an der Pielach	2722
Kirchberg bei Mattighofen	7747
Kirchberg in Tirol	5357
Kirchdorf an der Krems	7582
Kirchham	7619
Kirchschlag in der Buckligen Welt	2646
Kirchstetten	2523
Kittsee	2143
Kitzbühel	5356
Klagenfurt am Wörthersee	463
Klaus an der Pyhrnbahn	7585
Klausen-Leopoldsdorf	2257
Kleblach-Lind	4768
Klein Sankt Paul	4264
Kleinarl	6418
Kleinlobming	3516
Kleinreifling	7357
Kleinwarasdorf	2614
Kleinzell	2766
Klösterle	5582
Klosterneuburg	2243
Knittelfeld	3512
Köflach	3144
Kohfidisch	3366
Königswiesen	7955
Kopfing im Innkreis	7763
Kopfstetten	2214
Koppl	6221
Korneuburg	2262
Kössen	5375
Kötschach-Mauthen	4715
Kottes	2873
Köttmannsdorf	4220
Krakaudorf	3535
Kraubath an der Mur	3832
Krems an der Donau	2732
Kremsbrücke	4735
Kremsmünster	7583
Krieglach	3855
Krimml	6564
Krispl	6240
Krottendorf-Gaisfeld	3143
Krumbach (Niederösterreich)	2647
Krumpendorf am Wörthersee	4229
Kufstein	5372
Kühtai	5239
Kukmirn	3328
Kumberg	3132
Kundl	5338
Laa an der Thaya	2522
Laakirchen	7613
Lackendorf	2619
Ladendorf	2575
Lafnitz	3338
Lambach	7245
Lambrechten	7765
Lamprechtshausen	6274
Landeck	5442
Landl	3633
Langau	7480
Langen bei Bregenz	5575
Längenfeld	5253
Langenlois	2734
Langenwang	3854
Langenzersdorf	2244
Langschlag	2814
Lassee	2213
Laterns	5526
Launsdorf	4213
Lavamünd	4356
Lech	5583
Leibnitz	3452
Lembach im Mühlkreis	7286
Lend	6416
Leoben	3842
Leobersdorf	2256
Leogang	6583
Leopoldsdorf im Marchfelde	2216
Lesachtal	4716
Lessach	6484
Leutasch	5214
Leutschach	3454
Lichtenau im Waldviertel	2718
Lichtenberg	7239
Lichtenegg	2643
Liebenau	7953
Liebenfels	4215
Lienz	4852
Liezen	3612
Lilienfeld	2762
Linz	732
Litschau	2865
Litzelsdorf	3358
Lochen am See	7745
Lockenhaus	2616
Lofer	6588
Loipersdorf-Kitzladen	3359
Loosdorf	2754
Losenstein	7255
Lunz am See	7486
Lustenau	5577
Lutzmannsburg	2615
Maissau	2958
Mallnitz	4784
Malta	4733
Mandling	6454
Mank	2755
Mannersdorf am Leithagebirge	2168
Mannersdorf an der Rabnitz	2611
Marbach an der Donau	7413
Marchegg	2285
Marchtrenk	7243
Maria Alm am Steinernen Meer	6584
Maria Neustift	7250
Maria Saal	4223
Maria Schmolln	7743
Maria-Lanzendorf	2235
Mariapfarr	6473
Mariazell	3882
Markgrafneusiedl	2248
Markt Allhau	3356
Markt Hartmannsdorf	3114
Markt Piesting	2633
Markt Sankt Martin	2618
Martinsberg	2874
Matrei am Brenner	5273
Matrei in Osttirol	4875
Mattersburg	2626
Mattighofen	7742
Mattsee	6217
Matzen-Raggendorf	2289
Mauerkirchen	7724
Maurach	5243
Mautern in Steiermark	3845
Mauterndorf	6472
Mauthausen	7238
Mayrhofen	5285
Melk	2752
Mellau	5518
Metnitz	4267
Mettmach	7755
Mieming	5264
Miklauzhof	4237
Millstatt am See	4766
Mistelbach an der Zaya	2572
Mitterdorf im Mürztal	3858
Mittersill	6562
Mittertrixen	4231
Möderbrugg	3571
Mödling	2236
Modriach	3146
Möllbrücke	4769
Molln	7584
Mönchdorf	7267
Mondsee	6232
Mönichkirchen	2649
Moorbad Harbach	2858
Mörtschach	4826
Mühlbach am Hochkönig	6467
Mühlen	3586
Muhr	6479
Münchendorf	2259
Munderfing	7744
Münzkirchen	7716
Murau	3532
Mureck	3472
Mürzsteg	3859
Mürzzuschlag	3852
Nappersdorf	2953
Nassereith	5265
Nauders	5473
Navis	5278
Nenzing	5525
Nestelbach bei Graz	3133
Neuberg an der Mürz	3857
Neufelden	7282
Neuhofen an der Krems	7227
Neukirchen (Altmünster)	7618
Neukirchen am Großvenediger	6565
Neukirchen am Walde	7278
Neukirchen an der Enknach	7729
Neulengbach	2772
Neumarkt am Wallersee	6216
Neumarkt im Hausruckkreis	7733
Neumarkt im Mühlkreis	7941
Neumarkt in Steiermark	3584
Neunkirchen	2635
Neupölla	2988
Neusiedl am See	2167
Neusiedl an der Zaya	2533
Neustadtl an der Donau	7471
Neustift im Stubaital	5226
Nickelsdorf	2146
Niederfellabrunn	2269
Niederfladnitz	2949
Niedernsill	6548
Niedersulz	2534
Nikolsdorf	4858
Nötsch im Gailtal	4256
Nußdorf am Haunsberg	6276
Obdach	3578
Oberdrauburg	4710
Ober-Grafendorf	2747
Oberhofen am Irrsee	6213
Oberkappel	7284
Obernberg am Inn	7758
Oberndorf an der Melk	7483
Oberndorf bei Salzburg	6272
Oberpullendorf	2612
Oberschützen	3353
Obersiebenbrunn	2286
Obertauern	6456
Obertilliach	4847
Obertraun	6131
Obertrum am See	6219
Obervellach	4782
Oberwaltersdorf	2253
Oberwang	6233
Oberwart	3352
Oberweiden	2284
Oberwölbling	2786
Oberwölz	3581
Obritz	2943
Oed-Oehling	7478
Oetz	5252
Oppenberg	3619
Opponitz	7444
Orth an der Donau	2212
Ostermiething	6278
Ottenschlag	2872
Ottensheim	7234
Ottnang am Hausruck	7676
Ötztal-Bahnhof	5266
Pabneukirchen	7265
Paldau	3150
Palfau	3638
Parndorf	2166
Passail	3179
Paudorf	2736
Peggau	3127
Peilstein im Mühlviertel	7287
Perg	7262
Pernegg an der Mur	3867
Pernitz	2632
Perschling	2784
Petronell-Carnuntum	2163
Pettenbach	7586
Pettneu am Arlberg	5448
Peuerbach	7276
Pfaffenschlag bei Waidhofen an der Thaya	2848
Pfunds	5474
Pichl-Kainisch	3624
Piesendorf	6549
Pinkafeld	3357
Pischeldorf	4224
Pischelsdorf in der Steiermark	3113
Pitten	2627
Pöchlarn	2757
Podersdorf am See	2177
Pöggstall	2758
Pölfing-Brunn	3465
Pöllau	3335
Pöls	3579
Pörtschach am Wörther See	4272
Pottendorf	2623
Pöttsching	2631
Poysdorf	2552
Prägraten am Großvenediger	4877
Pram	7736
Prebl	4353
Preding	3185
Pregarten	7236
Prein an der Rax	2665
Preitenegg	4354
Prellenkirchen	2145
Preßbaum	2233
Prinzersdorf	2749
Probstdorf	2215
Prutz	5472
Puch bei Weiz	3177
Puchberg am Schneeberg	2636
Puchenstuben	2726
Pulkau	2946
Purbach am Neusiedler See	2683
Purgstall an der Erlauf	7489
Purkersdorf	2231
Pusterwald	3574
Pyhra	2745
Raab	7762
Raabs an der Thaya	2846
Rabenstein an der Pielach	2723
Radenthein	4246
Radmer	3635
Radstadt	6452
Raggal	5553
Rainbach im Mühlkreis	7949
Ramingstein	6475
Rappottenstein	2828
Rastenfeld	2826
Ratten	3173
Rauris	6544
Rechnitz	3363
Reichenau an der Rax	2666
Reichenau im Mühlkreis	7211
Reichenfels	4359
Reichenthal	7214
Reidling	2276
Reifnitz	4273
Reißeck	4783
Rennweg am Katschberg	4734
Retz	2942
Reutte	5672
Ried am Riederberg	2271
Ried im Innkreis	7752
Ried im Traunkreis	7588
Riedau	7764
Riegersburg	3153
Hardegg	2916
Riezlern	5517
Rohrau	2164
Rohrbach in Oberösterreich	7289
Roppen	5417
Rosenau am Hengstpaß	7566
Rossatz	2714
Rothenthurn	4767
Rottenmann	3614
Rückersdorf	2264
Ruden	4234
Rußbach am Paß Gschütt	6242
Rust	2685
Saalbach-Hinterglemm	6541
Saalfelden am Steinernen Meer	6582
Salla	3147
Salzburg	662
Sandl	7944
Sankt Aegidi	7717
Sankt Aegyd am Neuwalde	2768
Sankt Andrä	4358
Sankt Andrä-Wördern	2242
Sankt Anna am Aigen	3158
Sankt Anton am Arlberg	5446
Sankt Florian	7224
Sankt Gallen	3632
Sankt Gallenkirch	5557
Sankt Georgen am Walde	7954
Sankt Georgen an der Gusen	7237
Sankt Georgen an der Stiefing	3183
Sankt Georgen im Attergau	7667
Sankt Georgen ob Murau	3537
Sankt Gilgen	6227
Sankt Jakob im Rosental	4253
Sankt Jakob in Defereggen	4873
Sankt Jodok am Brenner	5279
Sankt Johann am Tauern	3575
Sankt Johann im Pongau	6412
Sankt Johann in Tirol	5352
Sankt Kanzian am Klopeiner See	4239
Sankt Katharein an der Laming	3869
Sankt Koloman	6241
Sankt Lambrecht	3585
Sankt Leonhard am Forst	2756
Sankt Leonhard am Hornerwald	2987
Sankt Leonhard im Pitztal	5413
Sankt Lorenzen am Wechsel	3331
Sankt Lorenzen bei Knittelfeld	3515
Sankt Marein bei Graz	3119
Sankt Marein im Mürztal	3864
Sankt Margareten im Rosental	4226
Sankt Margarethen im Burgenland	2680
Sankt Margarethen im Lungau	6476
Sankt Martin am Grimming	3684
Sankt Martin am Wöllmißberg	3140
Sankt Martin im Innkreis	7751
Sankt Martin im Mühlkreis	7232
Sankt Michael im Burgenland	3327
Sankt Michael im Lungau	6477
Sankt Michael in Obersteiermark	3843
Sankt Nikolai im Sölktal	3689
Sankt Oswald bei Freistadt	7945
Sankt Oswald bei Plankenwarth	3123
Sankt Oswald in Freiland	3469
Sankt Oswald ob Eibiswald	3468
St. Pankraz	7565
St. Pantaleon	6277
Sankt Paul im Lavanttal	4357
Sankt Peter am Kammersberg	3536
Sankt Peter am Ottersbach	3477
Sankt Peter in der Au	7477
Sankt Pölten	2742
Sankt Ruprecht an der Raab	3178
Sankt Stefan im Gailtal	4283
Sankt Valentin	7435
Sankt Veit an der Glan	4212
Sankt Veit an der Gölsen	2763
Sankt Veit im Mühlkreis	7217
Sankt Veit in Defereggen	4879
Sankt Wolfgang im Salzkammergut	6138
Sarleinsbach	7283
Satteins	5524
Sattledt	7244
Schardenberg	7713
Schärding	7712
Scharnitz	5213
Scharnstein	7615
Scheibbs	7482
Scheifling	3582
Schiedlberg	7251
Schladming	3687
Schönau im Mühlkreis	7261
Schönbach	2827
Schönberg am Kamp	2733
Schönberg-Lachtal	3587
Schönwies	5418
Schottwien	2663
Schrems	2853
Schröcken	5519
Schruns	5556
Schützen am Gebirge	2684
Schwadorf	2230
Schwanberg	3467
Schwand im Innkreis	7728
Schwanenstadt	7673
Schwarzach im Pongau	6415
Schwarzau im Gebirge	2667
Schwarzenau	2849
Schwarzenbach an der Pielach	2724
Schwarzenberg am Böhmerwald	7280
Schwaz	5242
Schweiggers	2829
Sebersdorf	3333
Seckau	3514
See	5441
Seefeld in Tirol	5212
Seekirchen am Wallersee	6212
Seewalchen am Attersee	7662
Sellrain	5230
Selzthal	3616
Semmering	2664
Serfaus	5476
Siegendorf	2687
Sieggraben	2621
Sieghartskirchen	2274
Sierndorf	2267
Sierning	7259
Sigmundsherberg	2983
Sillian	4842
Silz	5263
Sinabelkirchen	3118
Sipbachzell	7240
Sirnitz	4279
Sitzendorf an der Schmida	2959
Soboth	3460
Söchau	3387
Söding	3137
Sölden	5254
Söll	5333
Sonntag	5554
Spital am Pyhrn	7563
Spital am Semmering	3853
Spittal an der Drau	4762
Spitz	2713
Stadl an der Mur	3534
Stadtschlaining	3355
Stainach	3682
Stainz	3463
Stanzach	5632
Stegersbach	3326
Steinach am Brenner	5272
Steinakirchen am Forst	7488
Steinbach am Attersee	7663
Steinberg am Rofan	5248
Steinbrunn	2688
Steinerkirchen an der Traun	7241
Steinfeld	4717
Steuerberg	4271
Steyr	7252
Stockenboi	4761
Stockerau	2266
Straden	3473
Straßburg	4266
Strasshof an der Nordbahn	2287
Straßwalchen	6215
Strem	3324
Strengberg	7432
Strobl	6137
Stronsdorf	2526
Stubenberg	3176
Studenzen	3115
Stützenhofen	2554
Suben	7711
Tadten	2176
Tamsweg	6474
Tannheim	5675
Taufkirchen an der Pram	7719
Tauplitz	3688
Taxenbach	6543
Techendorf	4713
Telfs	5262
Ternberg	7256
Ternitz	2630
Terz	3883
Thalgau	6235
Theras	2947
Thiersee	5376
Thüringen	5550
Tiefenfucha	2739
Tösens	5477
Traboch	3833
Tragöß	3868
Trahütten	3461
Traismauer	2783
Traun	7229
Traunkirchen	7617
Trautmannsdorf an der Leitha	2169
Treffen am Ossiacher See	4248
Treibach	4262
Tresdorf	4823
Trieben	3615
Trins	5275
Trofaiach	3847
Tröpolach	4285
Tulbing	2273
Tulln an der Donau	2272
Turnau	3863
Türnitz	2769
Turrach	3533
Tux	5287
Tweng	6471
Übelbach	3125
Ulrichsberg	7288
Umhausen	5255
Unken	6589
Unterach am Attersee	7665
Untergurgl	5256
Unterlaussa	3631
Unter-Meisling	2717
Untertauern	6455
Unterweißenbach	7956
Unzmarkt-Frauenburg	3583
Uttendorf	6563
Veitsch	3856
Velden am Wörther See	4274
Velm-Götzendorf	2538
Villach	4242
Vils	5677
Virgen	4874
Vitis	2841
Vöcklabruck	7672
Vöcklamarkt	7682
Voitsberg	3142
Völkermarkt	4232
Vorau	3337
Vorchdorf	7614
Vordernberg	3849
Vorderweißenbach	7219
Wagrain	6413
Waidhofen an der Thaya	2842
Waidhofen an der Ybbs	7442
Waidring	5353
Waizenkirchen	7277
Walchsee	5374
Wald am Schoberpaß	3834
Waldbach	3336
Waldenstein	2855
Waldhausen im Strudengau	7260
Waldkirchen am Wesen	7718
Waldzell	7754
Wallern im Burgenland	2174
Wallsee-Sindelburg	7433
Wartberg an der Krems	7587
Warth	2629
Wattens	5224
Wegscheid	3884
Weichselboden	3886
Weikertschlag an der Thaya	2845
Weins-Isperdorf	7414
Weißbriach	4286
Weißenbach am Lech	5678
Weissenbach an der Triesting	2674
Weißenkirchen in der Wachau	2715
Weitensfeld im Gurktal	4265
Weitersfeld	2948
Weitersfelden	7952
Weitra	2856
Weiz	3172
Wels	7242
Wenns	5414
Werfen	6468
Werfenweng	6466
Wernberg	4252
Westendorf	5334
Weyer	7355
Weyregg am Attersee	7664
Wien	1 (previously: 222)
Wiener Neustadt	2622
Wienerbruck	2728
Wieselburg	7416
Wiesmath	2645
Wildalpen	3636
Wildon	3182
Wildschönau	5339
Wilfersdorf	2573
Wilhelmsburg	2746
Wilhering	7226
Willendorf	2620
Windhaag bei Freistadt	7943
Windhaag bei Perg	7264
Windischgarsten	7562
Winklarn	7472
Winzendorf-Muthmannsdorf	2638
Wolfern	7253
Wolfsberg	4352
Wolfsberg im Schwarzautal	3184
Wolkersdorf im Weinviertel	2245
Wörgl	5332
Wulzeshofen	2527
Ybbs an der Donau	7412
Ybbsitz	7443
Zederhaus	6478
Zell am Moos	6234
Zell am See	6542
Zell am Ziller	5282
Zellerndorf	2945
Zeltweg	3577
Ziersdorf	2956
Zirl	5238
Zistersdorf	2532
Zurndorf	2147
Zwentendorf an der Donau	2277
Zwettl an der Rodl	7212
Zwettl-Niederösterreich	2822

== Mobile phone codes ==
In ascending numeric order:

Mobile Providers with own Networks
Provider	Code
Drei	660 and 699
A1	664
T-Mobile	676

Mobile Providers without own Networks
Provider	Network	Code
Telering^{1}	T-Mobile	650
MTEL Austria	A1	667
BoB^{2}	A1	680
yesss!^{2}	A1	681 and 6998
Eety^{2}	Drei	665
Tele2	A1	688
Vectone	T-Mobile	688
HoT	T-Mobile	677
spusu	Drei	670
Lidl Connect	Drei	690

- ^{1} Telering was bought by T-Mobile in 2005. As of 2006, Telering uses the network-infrastructure of T-Mobile. As a special requirement of the European commission, many of the former transmitters and frequencies previously operated by Telering were given to Orange and Drei.
- ^{2} BoB is a discount service of A1. yesss! was a discount service of Orange, now sold to A1. Eety is a discount service of Orange (now Drei).

Due to Mobile number portability, the code is not an accurate way to determine the provider of a mobile phone number. The providers assign only in exceptional cases (special sort of custom numbers, more expensive) non-existing numbers with a different prefix, and this is handled similarly to porting an existing number from the desired network. However, the providers still have administrative sovereignty over their own prefixes.

== Special/Service codes ==
Service	Code
call-by-call providers	10
public (emergency) services	1xx
phone breakdown advice (land line)	111
generic emergency service	112
directory service	118
car breakdown assistance (ÖAMTC)	120
fire department (emergency)	122
car breakdown assistance (ARBÖ)	123
police (emergency)	133
mountain rescue	140
telephone counseling for adults (Telefonseelsorge)	142
ambulance (emergency)	144
telephone counseling for children (Rat auf Draht)	147
public services	1xxx
free services	802
free services	800
dial-up / ISP	804
dial-up / ISP	718
personal services	710
personal services	730
personal services	740
premium rate	901
premium rate	930
premium rate	931
premium rate	900
premium rate dialers	939
services with regulated max. tariffs	820
services with regulated max. tariffs	828
services with regulated max. tariffs	810
services with regulated max. tariffs	821
telekom austria premium rate services	711
numbers for convergent services	780
virtual private network (VPN)	50x
