= Radkersburg District =

Coordinates: 46.754°N 15.817°E

Radkersburg District Bezirk Radkersburg
- District
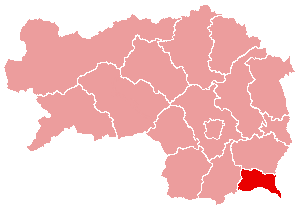
- Radkersburg District in Styria
- Country: Austria
- State: Styria
- Number of municipalities: 18

Area
  - Total: 337.0 km^{2} (130.1 sq mi)

Population (2001)
  - Total: 24,068
  - Density: 71.42/km^{2} (185.0/sq mi)
- Time zone: UTC+1 (CET)
  - Summer (DST): UTC+2 (CEST)

Bezirk Radkersburg is a former district of the state of Styria in Austria. Radkersburg merged with the district of Feldbach to form the new district Südoststeiermark on January 1, 2013.

== Municipalities ==
Suburbs, hamlets and other subdivisions of a municipality are indicated in small characters.

- Bad Radkersburg
- Bierbaum am Auersbach
- Deutsch Goritz
  - Hofstätten bei Deutsch Goritz, Krobathen, Oberspitz, Salsach, Schrötten bei Deutsch Goritz, Unterspitz, Weixelbaum, Haselbach
- Dietersdorf am Gnasbach
- Eichfeld
  - Hainsdorf-Brunnsee, Oberrakitsch
- Gosdorf
  - Diepersdorf, Fluttendorf, Misselsdorf
- Halbenrain
  - Dietzen, Donnersdorf, Dornau, Drauchen, Hürth, Oberpurkla, Unterpurkla, Hof bei Straden, Karla, Neusetz, Radochen
- Klöch
  - Deutsch Haseldorf, Gruisla, Klöchberg, Pölten
- Mettersdorf am Saßbach
  - Landorf, Rannersdorf am Saßbach, Rohrbach am Rosenberg, Zehensdorf
- Mureck
- Murfeld
  - Lichendorf, Oberschwarza, Seibersdorf bei Sankt Veit, Unterschwarza, Weitersfeld an der Mur
- Radkersburg Umgebung
  - Altneudörfl, Dedenitz, Goritz bei Radkersburg, Hummersdorf, Laafeld, Pfarrsdorf, Pridahof, Sicheldorf, Zelting
- Ratschendorf
- Sankt Peter am Ottersbach
  - Edla, Entschendorf am Ottersbach, Oberrosenberg, Perbersdorf bei Sankt Peter, Wiersdorf, Wittmannsdorf
- Straden
  - Hart bei Straden, Kronnersdorf, Marktl, Nägelsdorf, Schwabau, Waasen am Berg, Wieden-Klausen, Waldprecht
- Tieschen
  - Größing, Jörgen, Laasen, Patzen, Pichla bei Radkersburg
- Trössing
- Weinburg am Saßbach
  - Perbersdorf bei Sankt Veit, Pichla bei Mureck, Priebing, Siebing
