= Oberstorcha =

- Former municipality
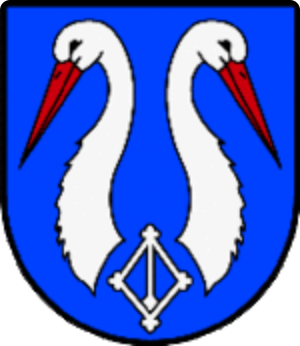
- Coat of arms

- Location within Austria
- Coordinates: 46°58′00″N 15°47′00″E
- Country: Austria
- State: Styria
- District: Südoststeiermark

Area
  - Total: 8.79 km^{2} (3.39 sq mi)
- Elevation: 310 m (1,020 ft)

Population (1 January 2016)
  - Total: 636
  - Density: 72.4/km^{2} (187/sq mi)
- Time zone: UTC+1 (CET)
  - Summer (DST): UTC+2 (CEST)
- Postal code: 8324
- Area code: +43 3115
- Vehicle registration: FB
- Website: www.oberstorcha. steiermark.at

Oberstorcha is a former municipality in the district of Südoststeiermark in the Austrian state of Styria. Since the 2015 Styria municipal structural reform, it is divided between the municipalities Paldau and Kirchberg an der Raab.

== Population ==
Historical population
Year	Pop.	±%
1869	682	—
1880	671	−1.6%
1890	673	+0.3%
1900	624	−7.3%
1910	645	+3.4%
1923	586	−9.1%
1934	643	+9.7%
1939	594	−7.6%
1951	612	+3.0%
1961	574	−6.2%
1971	591	+3.0%
1981	599	+1.4%
1991	588	−1.8%
2001	580	−1.4%
2013	624	+7.6%
