= Marktl (disambiguation) =

Marktl is the name of the following places:

- Marktl in Upper Bavaria, Germany
- a cadastral community of the municipality Straden in Styria, Austria
- a cadastral community of the municipality Lilienfeld in Lower Austria, Austria
