= Bierbaum am Auersbach =

- Former municipality
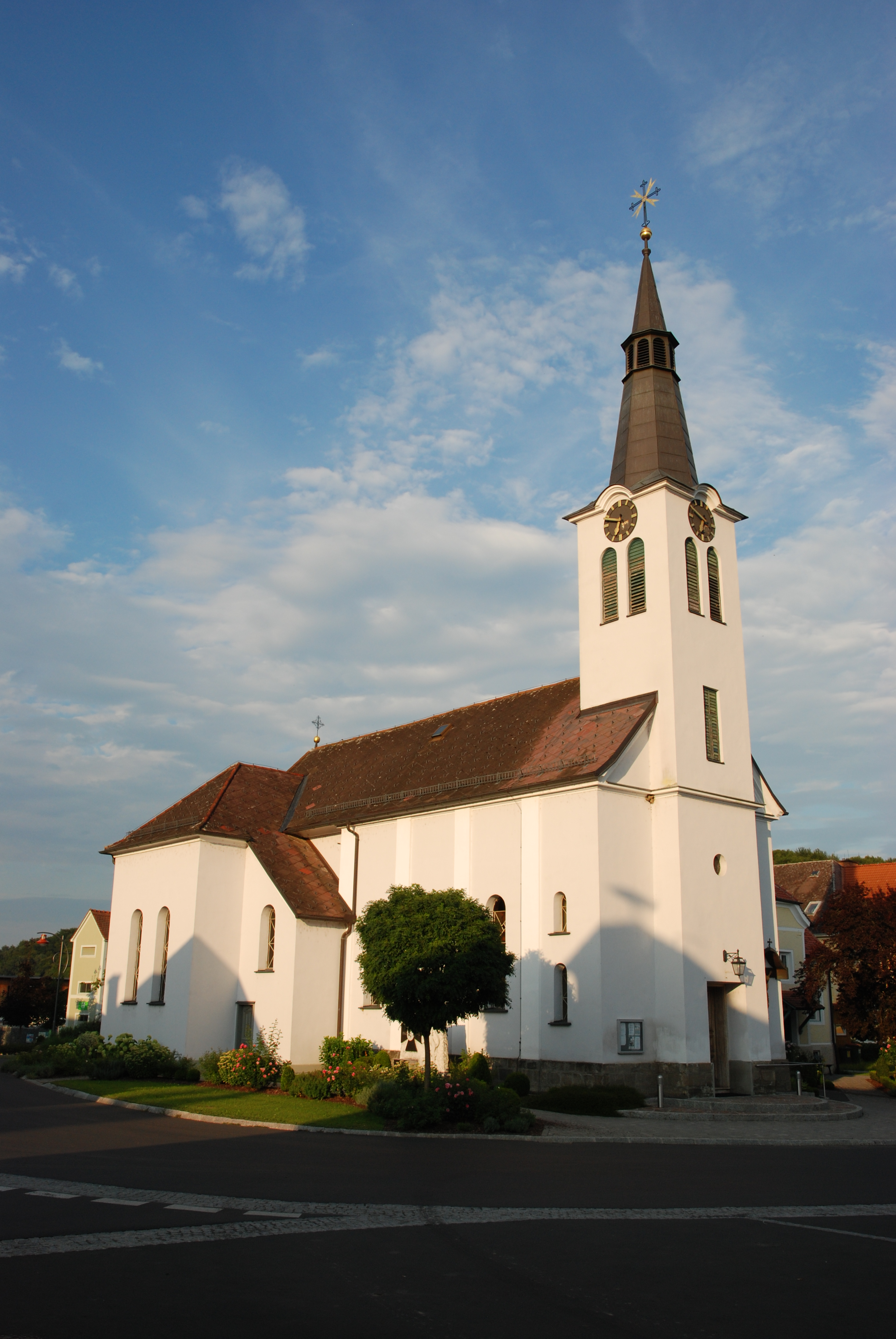
- Bierbaum am Auersbach parish church

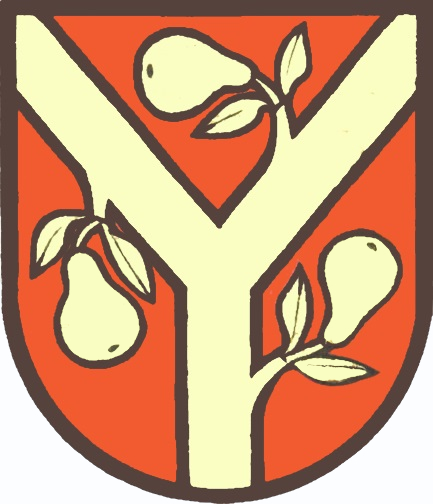
- Coat of arms

- Location within Austria
- Coordinates: 46°49′48″N 15°46′48″E
- Country: Austria
- State: Styria
- District: Südoststeiermark

Area
  - Total: 5.18 km^{2} (2.00 sq mi)
- Elevation: 296 m (971 ft)

Population (1 January 2016)
  - Total: 477
  - Density: 92.1/km^{2} (238/sq mi)
- Time zone: UTC+1 (CET)
  - Summer (DST): UTC+2 (CEST)
- Postal code: 8093
- Area code: 03477
- Vehicle registration: RA
- Website: www.bierbaum-auersbach.at

Bierbaum am Auersbach is a former municipality in the district of Südoststeiermark in the Austrian state of Styria. Since the 2015 Styria municipal structural reform, it is part of the municipality Sankt Peter am Ottersbach.

== Population ==
Historical population
| Year | Pop. | ±% |
|---|---|---|
| 1869 | 451 | — |
| 1880 | 458 | +1.6% |
| 1890 | 423 | −7.6% |
| 1900 | 400 | −5.4% |
| 1910 | 438 | +9.5% |
| 1923 | 437 | −0.2% |
| 1934 | 415 | −5.0% |
| 1939 | 395 | −4.8% |
| 1951 | 401 | +1.5% |
| 1961 | 465 | +16.0% |
| 1971 | 643 | +38.3% |
| 1981 | 606 | −5.8% |
| 1991 | 528 | −12.9% |
| 2001 | 508 | −3.8% |
| 2012 | 477 | −6.1% |
