= Trössing =

- Former municipality
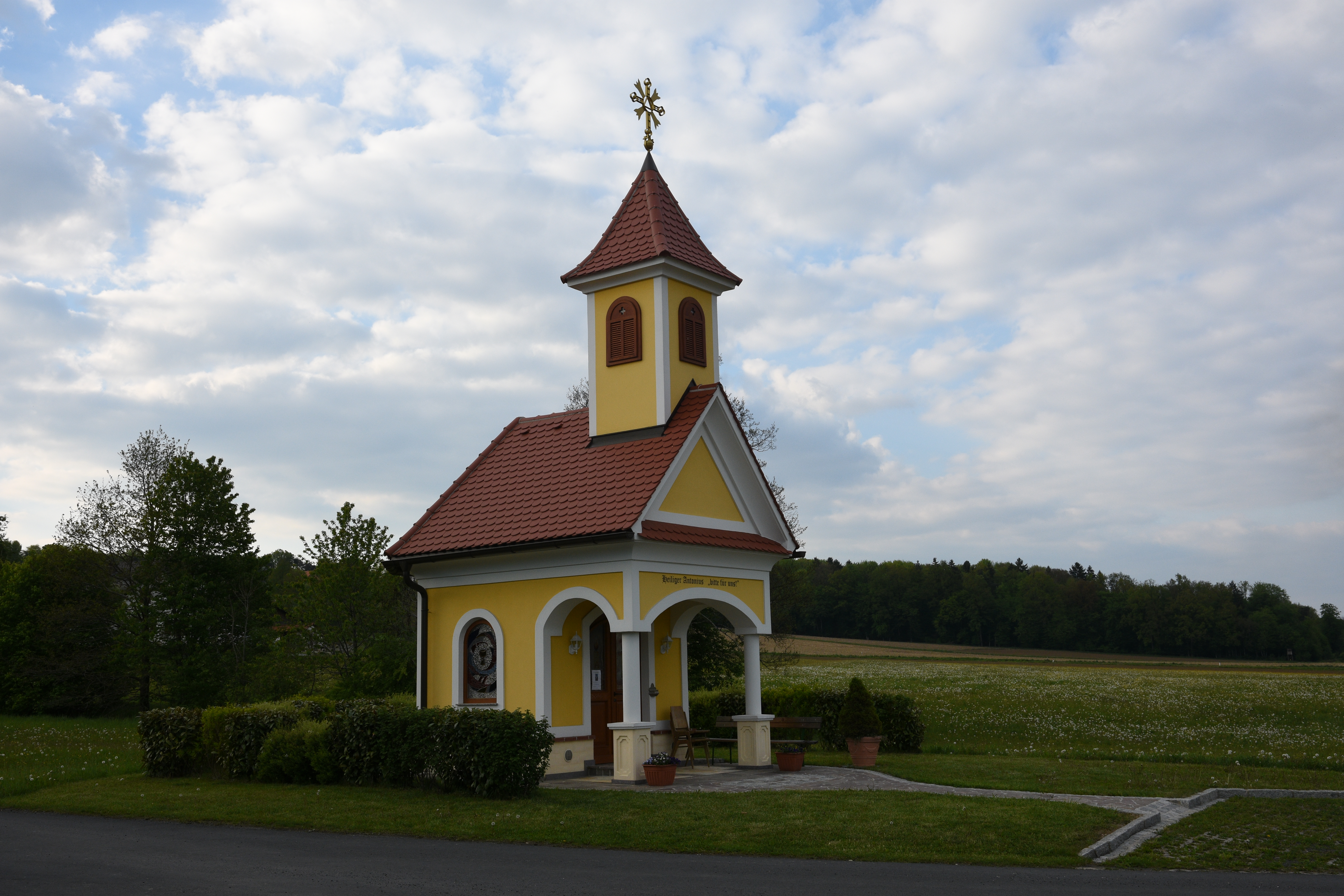
- Chapel in Trössing

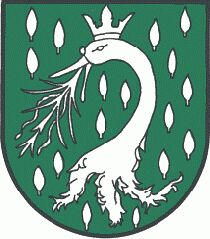
- Coat of arms

- Location within Austria
- Coordinates: 46°49′36″N 15°49′11″E
- Country: Austria
- State: Styria
- District: Südoststeiermark

Area
  - Total: 4.16 km^{2} (1.61 sq mi)
- Elevation: 260 m (850 ft)

Population (1 January 2016)
  - Total: 277
  - Density: 66.6/km^{2} (172/sq mi)
- Time zone: UTC+1 (CET)
  - Summer (DST): UTC+2 (CEST)
- Postal code: 8342, 8345
- Area code: 03477
- Vehicle registration: RA
- Website: www.troessing. steiermark.at

Trössing is a former municipality in the district of Südoststeiermark in the Austrian state of Styria. Since the 2015 Styria municipal structural reform, it is part of the municipality Gnas.

== Population ==
Historical population
Year	Pop.	±%
1869	358	—
1880	380	+6.1%
1890	378	−0.5%
1900	341	−9.8%
1910	336	−1.5%
1923	308	−8.3%
1934	316	+2.6%
1939	300	−5.1%
1951	305	+1.7%
1961	268	−12.1%
1971	307	+14.6%
1981	348	+13.4%
1991	311	−10.6%
2001	291	−6.4%
2012	277	−4.8%
