= Ratschendorf =

- Former municipality
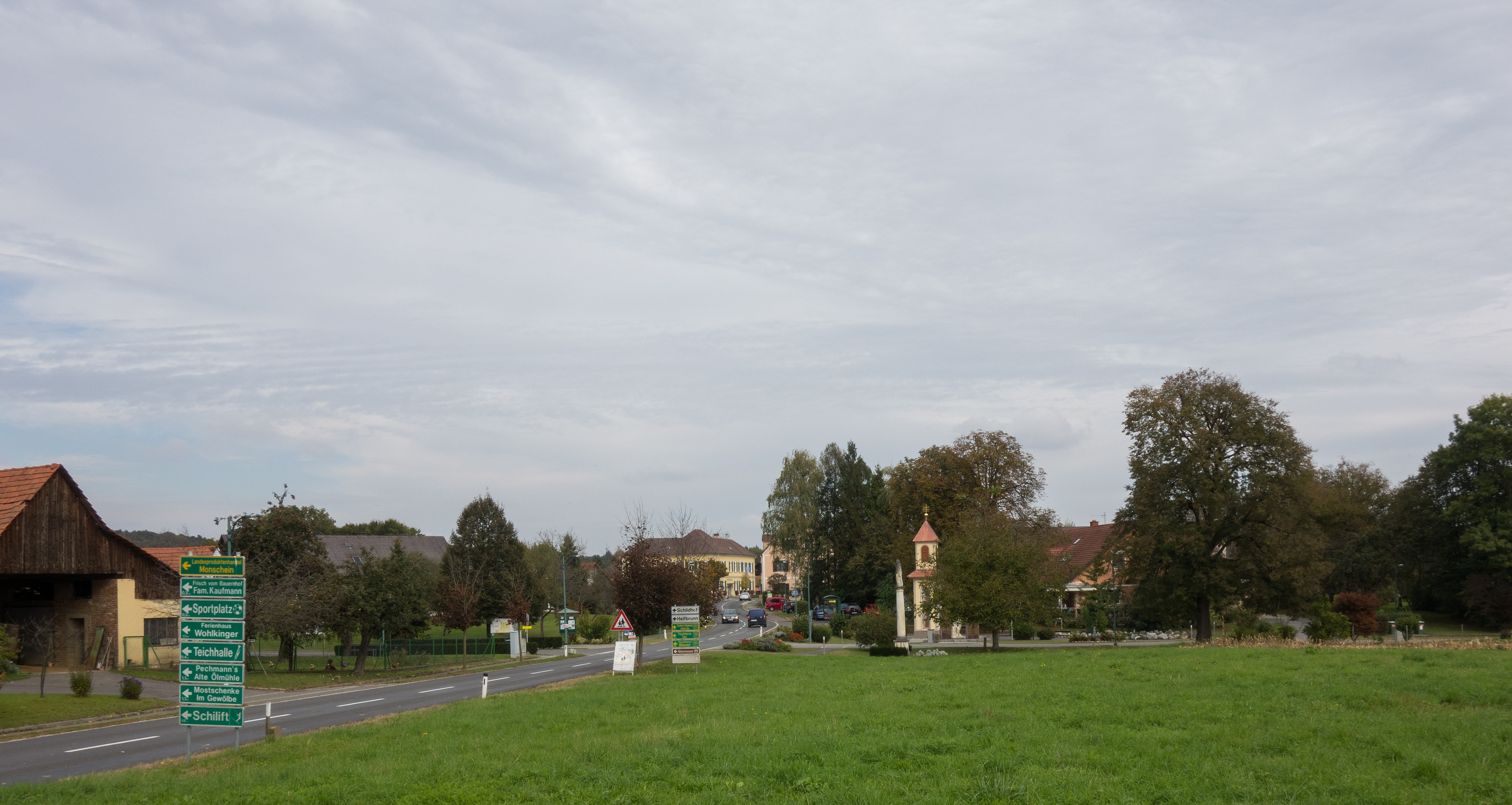
- View of Ratschendorf

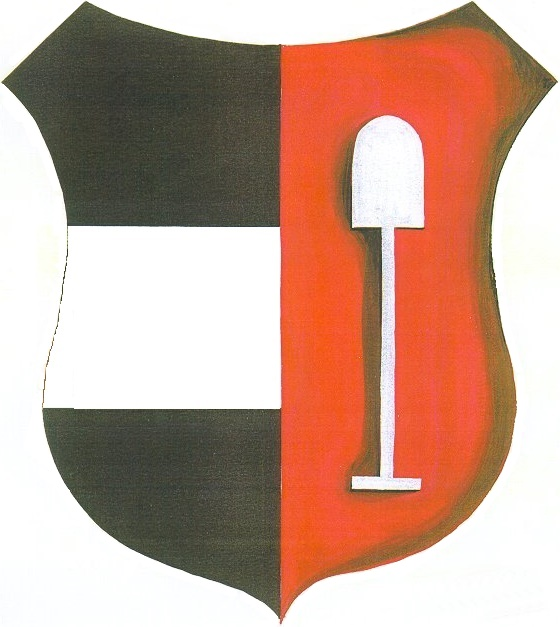
- Coat of arms

- Location within Austria
- Coordinates: 46°44′40″N 15°49′00″E
- Country: Austria
- State: Styria
- District: Südoststeiermark

Area
  - Total: 10.39 km^{2} (4.01 sq mi)
- Elevation: 240 m (790 ft)

Population (1 January 2016)
  - Total: 619
  - Density: 59.6/km^{2} (154/sq mi)
- Time zone: UTC+1 (CET)
  - Summer (DST): UTC+2 (CEST)
- Postal code: 8483
- Area code: 03474
- Vehicle registration: RA
- Website: www.ratschendorf.at

Ratschendorf (Slovene: Račja vas) is a former municipality in the district of Südoststeiermark in the Austrian state of Styria. Since the 2015 Styria municipal structural reform, it is part of the municipality Deutsch Goritz.

== Population ==
Historical population
Year	Pop.	±%
1869	657	—
1880	700	+6.5%
1890	740	+5.7%
1900	705	−4.7%
1910	726	+3.0%
1923	722	−0.6%
1934	760	+5.3%
1939	723	−4.9%
1951	749	+3.6%
1961	673	−10.1%
1971	663	−1.5%
1981	684	+3.2%
1991	679	−0.7%
2001	624	−8.1%
2012	619	−0.8%
