= Dietersdorf am Gnasbach =

- Former municipality
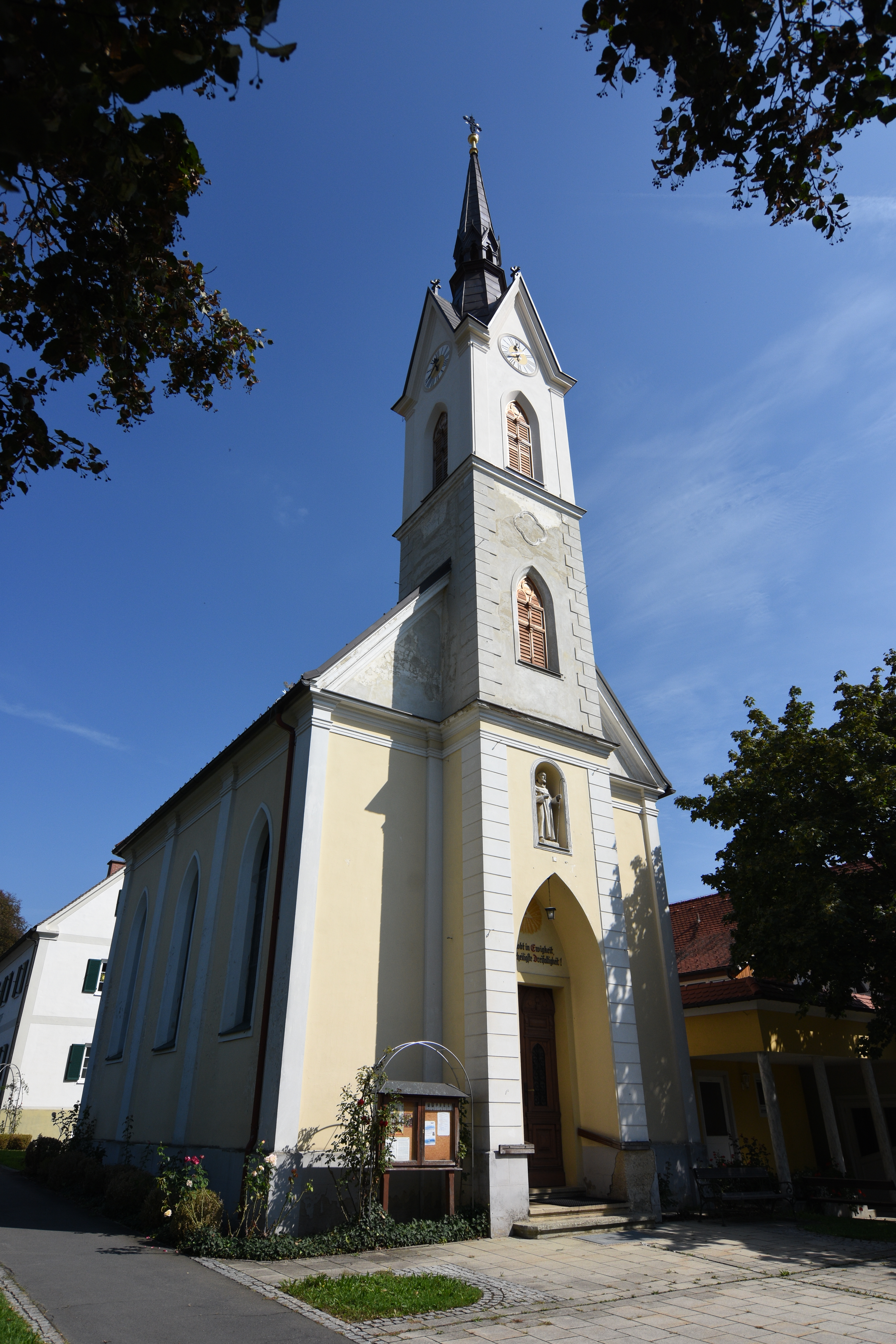
- Catholic church in Dietersdorf

- Location within Austria
- Coordinates: 46°48′36″N 15°48′36″E
- Country: Austria
- State: Styria
- District: Südoststeiermark

Area
  - Total: 6.56 km^{2} (2.53 sq mi)
- Elevation: 273 m (896 ft)

Population (1 January 2016)
  - Total: 370
  - Density: 56/km^{2} (150/sq mi)
- Time zone: UTC+1 (CET)
  - Summer (DST): UTC+2 (CEST)
- Postal code: 8093
- Area code: 03477
- Vehicle registration: RA
- Website: www.dietersdorf-gnasbach.steiermark.at

Dietersdorf am Gnasbach is a former municipality in the district of Südoststeiermark in the Austrian state of Styria. Since the 2015 Styria municipal structural reform, it is part of the municipality Sankt Peter am Ottersbach.

== Population ==
Historical population
Year	Pop.	±%
1869	554	—
1880	522	−5.8%
1890	515	−1.3%
1900	464	−9.9%
1910	454	−2.2%
1923	460	+1.3%
1934	468	+1.7%
1939	427	−8.8%
1951	407	−4.7%
1961	390	−4.2%
1971	478	+22.6%
1981	430	−10.0%
1991	406	−5.6%
2001	383	−5.7%
2012	370	−3.4%
