= Feldbach, Styria =

Feldbach
- Municipality
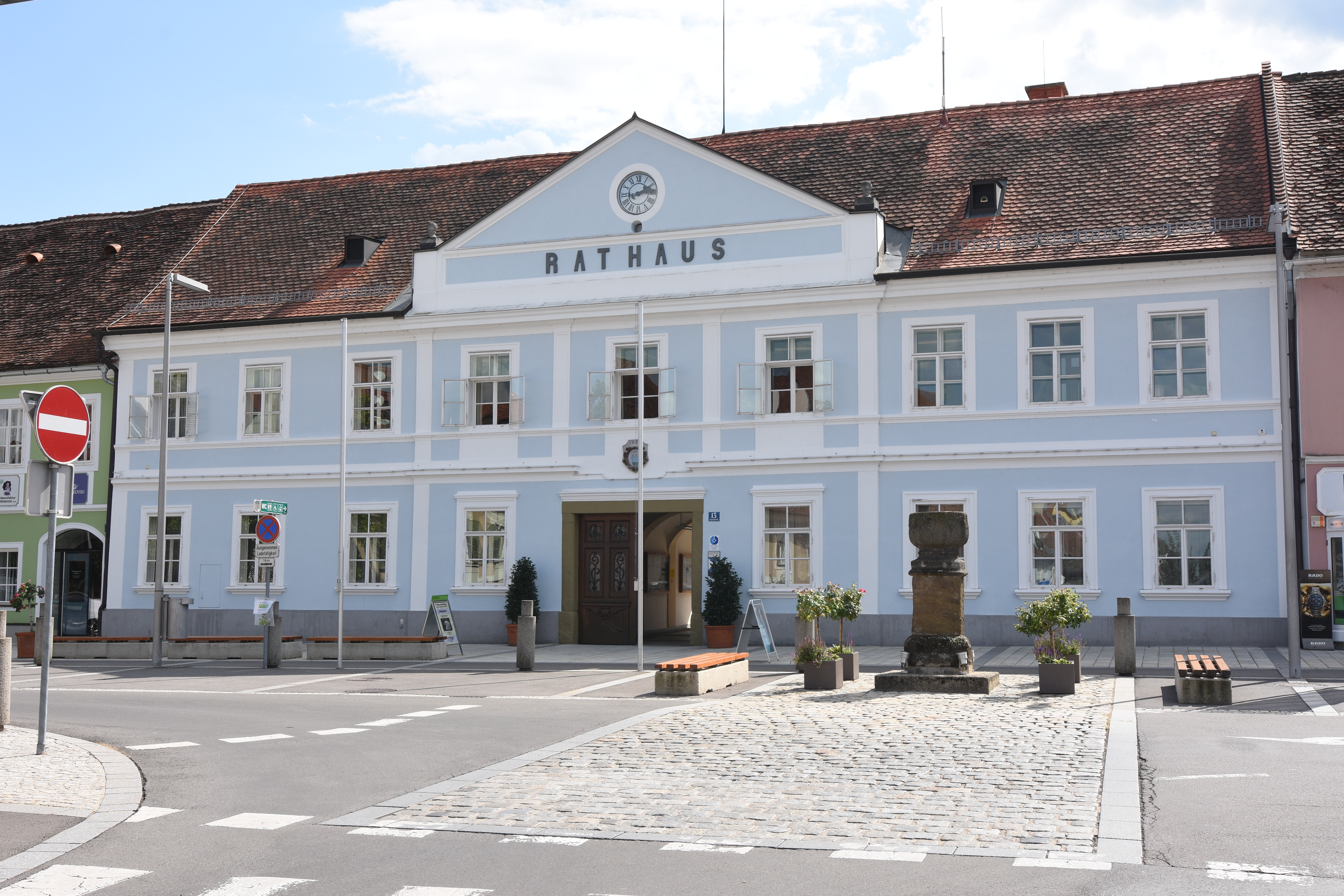
- Former Town hall

- Coat of arms

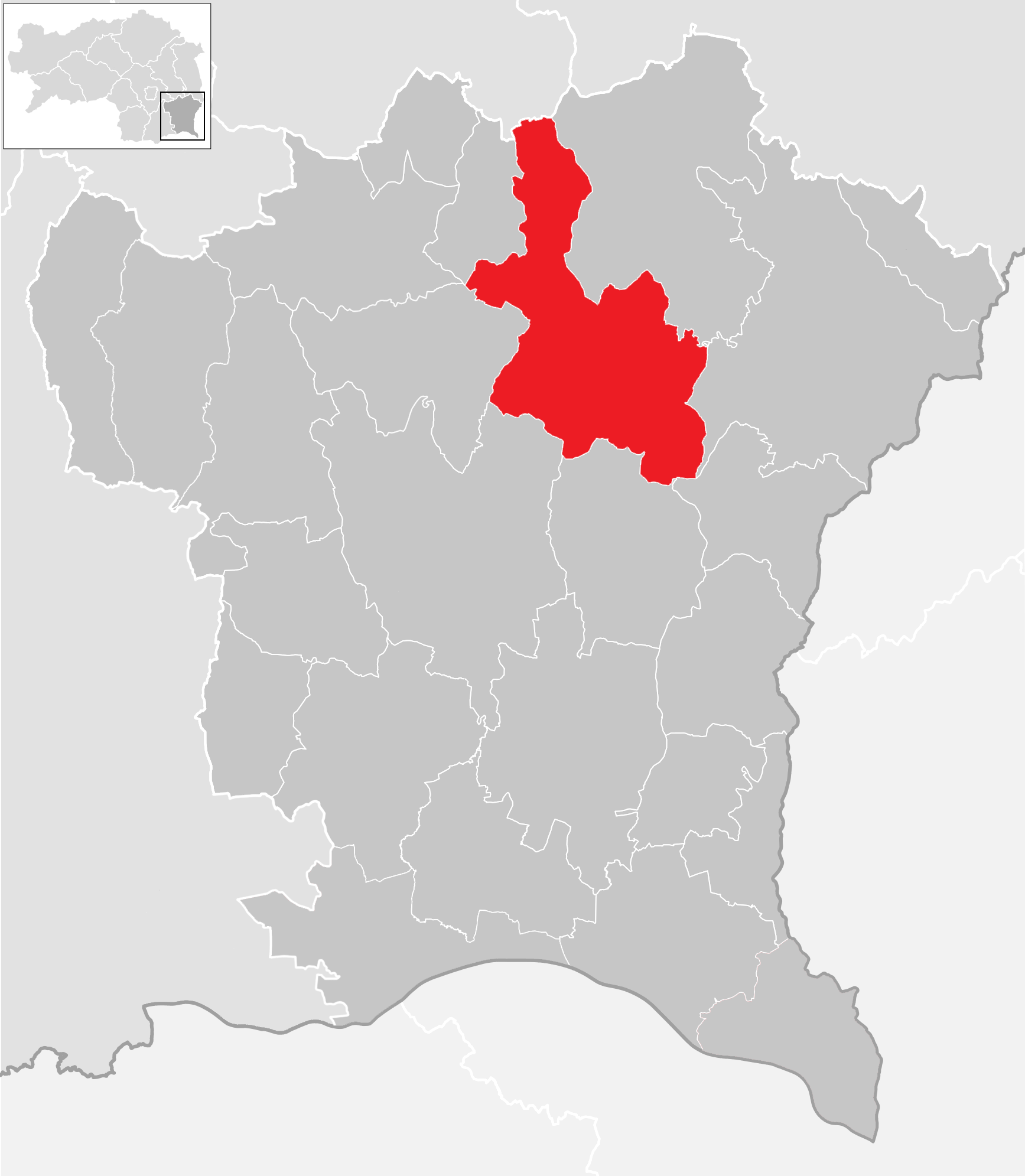
- Location within Südoststeiermark district

- Location within Austria
- Coordinates: 46°57′00″N 15°53′00″E
- Country: Austria
- State: Styria
- District: Südoststeiermark

Government
  - Mayor: Josef Ober (ÖVP)

Area
  - Total: 67.13 km^{2} (25.92 sq mi)
- Elevation: 282 m (925 ft)

Population (2018-01-01)
  - Total: 13,369
  - Density: 199.2/km^{2} (515.8/sq mi)
- Time zone: UTC+1 (CET)
  - Summer (DST): UTC+2 (CEST)
- Postal code: 8330
- Area code: +43 3152
- Vehicle registration: SO
- Website: www.feldbach.gv.at

Feldbach (Austrian German pronunciation: [ˈfɛldbax]; Slovene: Vrbna) is a town in the southeast of the Austrian state of Styria, near the Slovenian and Hungarian border. It is located in the valley around the river Raab. With 13,421 inhabitants (as of 1 January 2023), Feldbach is the fifth largest town in Styria.

== History ==
Findings from the Neolithic period prove the early existence of a settlement in the area where Feldbach is now located. The name "Feldbach" was first mentioned in 1188 as "Velwinbach". A parish exists since 1232.

In 1469, Feldbach was devastated by rebellious troops. This is probably the reason why the Feldbach Tabor, a medieval fortress, was built.

In the 15th century, Feldbach was the setting of many conflicts between rival aristocratic families which caused destruction and pillages in the town. Finally, after the Hajduks (which accompanied the attacking Ottoman Turks) destroyed the whole town, except the Tabor hill, a closed fortification with several gates was built.

Feldbach experienced a major economic upswing after the Hungarian Western railroad was opened in 1873. At the same time the nearby spa Bad Gleichenberg became well known.

During World War I a prisoner-of-war camp existed in Feldbach.

== Population ==
Historical population
Year	Pop.	±%
1869	5,876	—
1880	6,466	+10.0%
1890	6,849	+5.9%
1900	6,965	+1.7%
1910	7,417	+6.5%
1923	7,895	+6.4%
1934	8,613	+9.1%
1939	8,634	+0.2%
1951	9,248	+7.1%
1961	9,865	+6.7%
1971	10,807	+9.5%
1981	11,323	+4.8%
1991	11,784	+4.1%
2001	12,593	+6.9%
2011	12,910	+2.5%
2021	13,371	+3.6%

== Sights ==
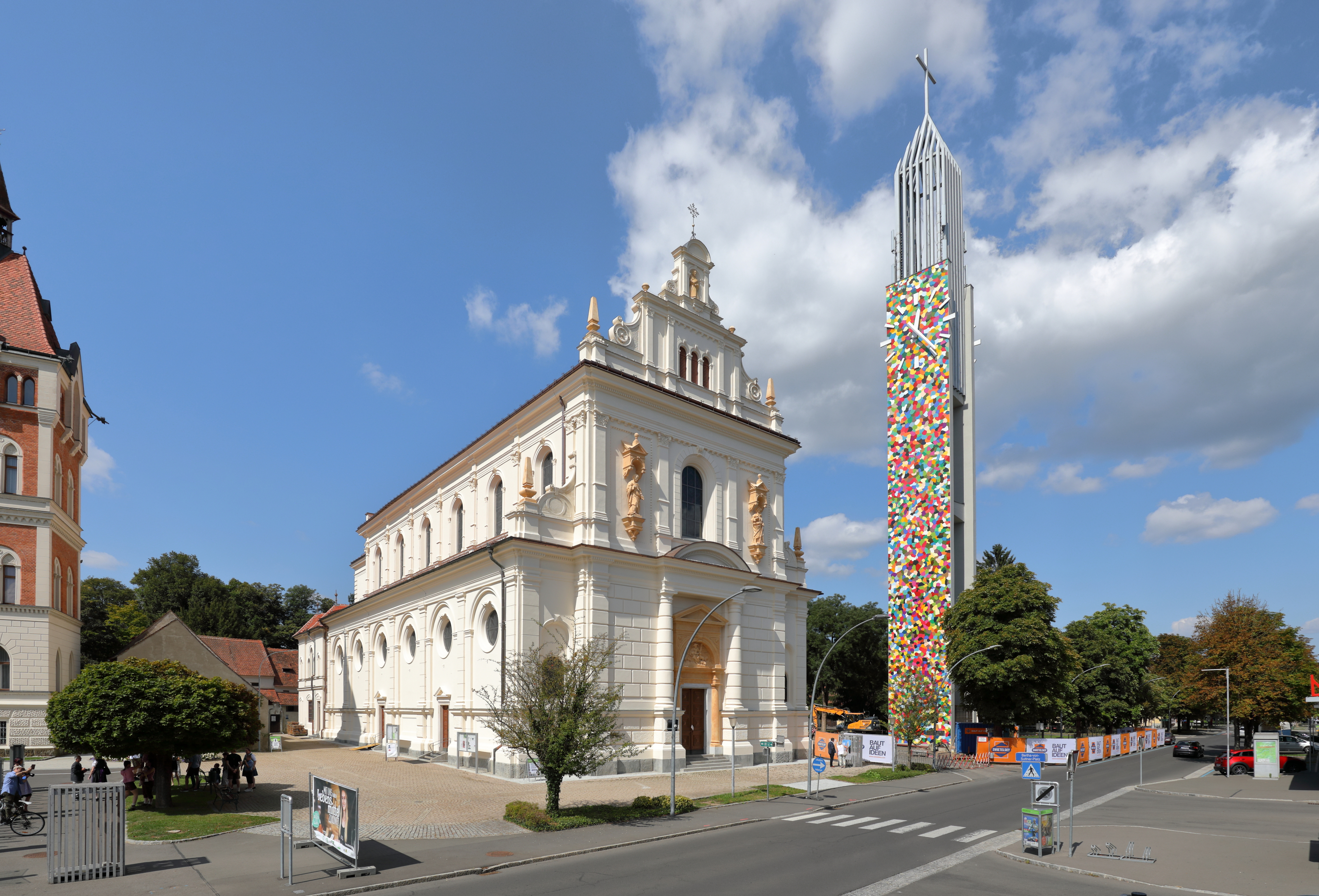
Parish church Holy Leonhard

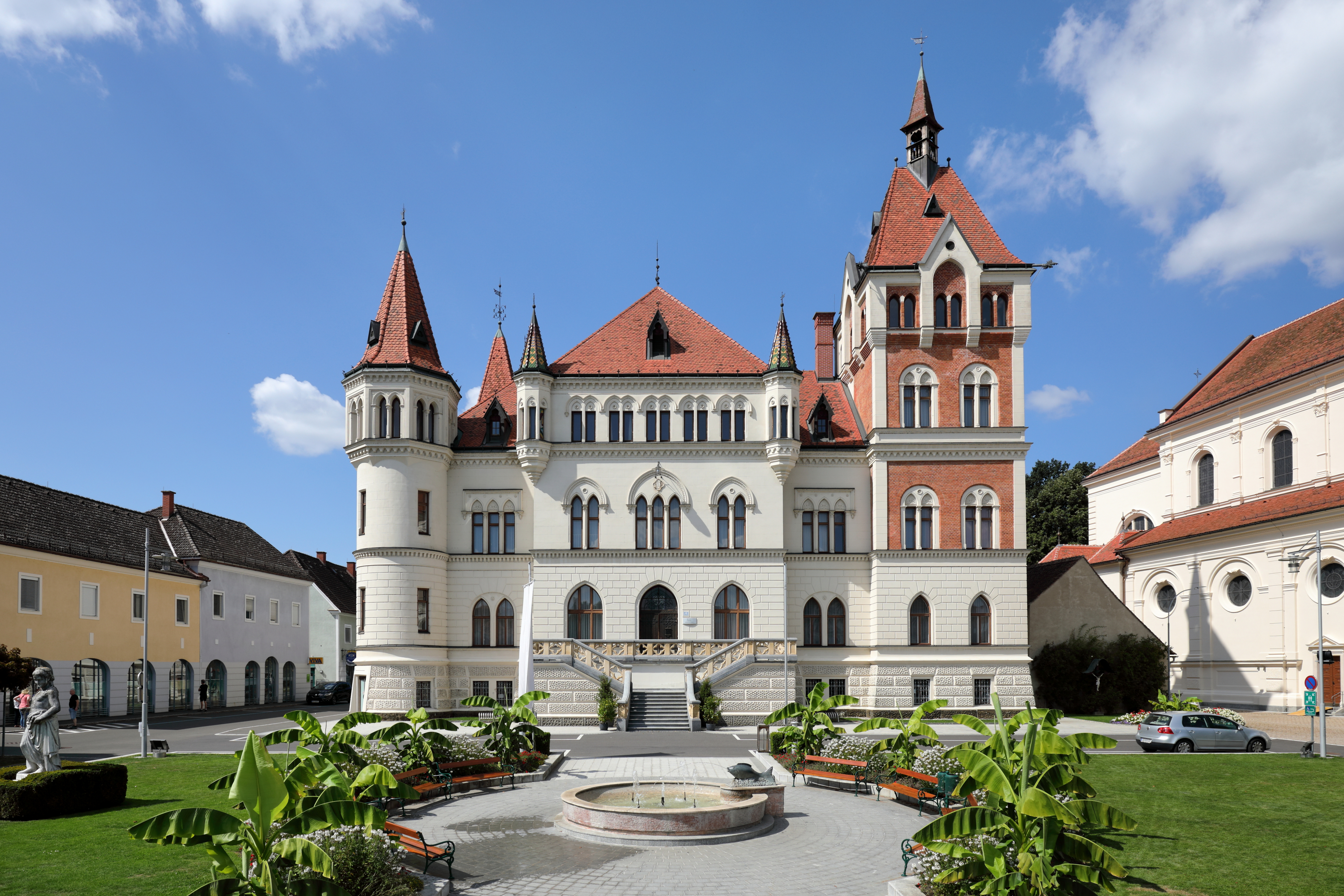
Villa Hold and new town hall

- Parish church Holy Leonhard: The first church was connected to the tabor building which still exists today. Building works for the new church in renaissance style started in 1898 which was planned by Hans Pascher. The original church tower was destroyed in 1945, which was then replaced by a free-standing tower painted in multiple flecks of colour.
- Steinener Metzen: The town's landmark is estimated to have been erected in the 15th century. This goblet-like measure of quantity was used as a standard measure for wooden containers for crops and is the only one of its type in Austria.
- Marian column: First built in 1717, it was later destroyed during the Second World War and rebuilt in 1949. It is located in the main square.
- Tabor museum: The tabor was built as a fortification during the Middle Ages and now houses a museum dedicated to life in the region from the Stone Ages up until the recent past. Exhibitions include the first Austrian fishing museum, the first Austrian tailoring museum and documents from World War I and World War II.
- Villa Hold: This neo-Gothic villa is situated next to the parish church Holy Leonhard and houses the music school, the city choir, the registrar's office as well as the citizenship office.
- Villa Julian Burkert: this gothic villa is located in the city centre, next to the music school and between church. It was built during the 19th century.
- Various chapels in the area
