= Murfeld =

- Former municipality
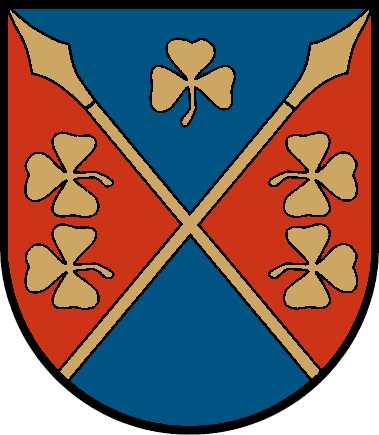
- Coat of arms

- Location within Austria
- Coordinates: 46°42′45″N 15°41′47″E
- Country: Austria
- State: Styria
- District: Südoststeiermark

Area
  - Total: 24.21 km^{2} (9.35 sq mi)
- Elevation: 244 m (801 ft)

Population (2018-01-01)
  - Total: 1,645
  - Density: 67.95/km^{2} (176.0/sq mi)
- Time zone: UTC+1 (CET)
  - Summer (DST): UTC+2 (CEST)
- Postal code: 8473, 8471, 8423
- Area code: +43 3472, +43 3453
- Vehicle registration: SO
- Website: www.murfeld.at

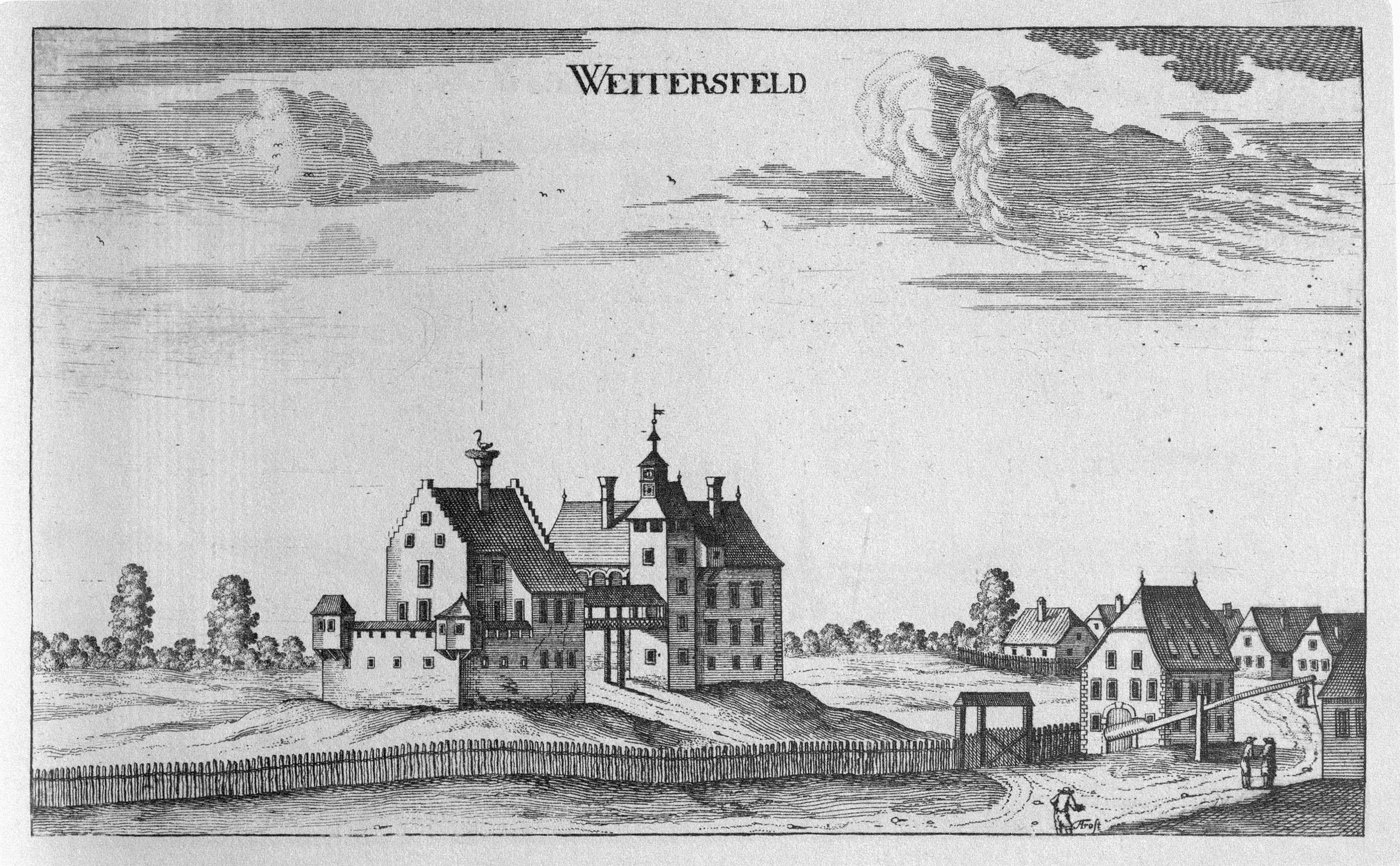
Vischer - Topographia Ducatus Stiriae - 468 Weitersfeld bei Mureck

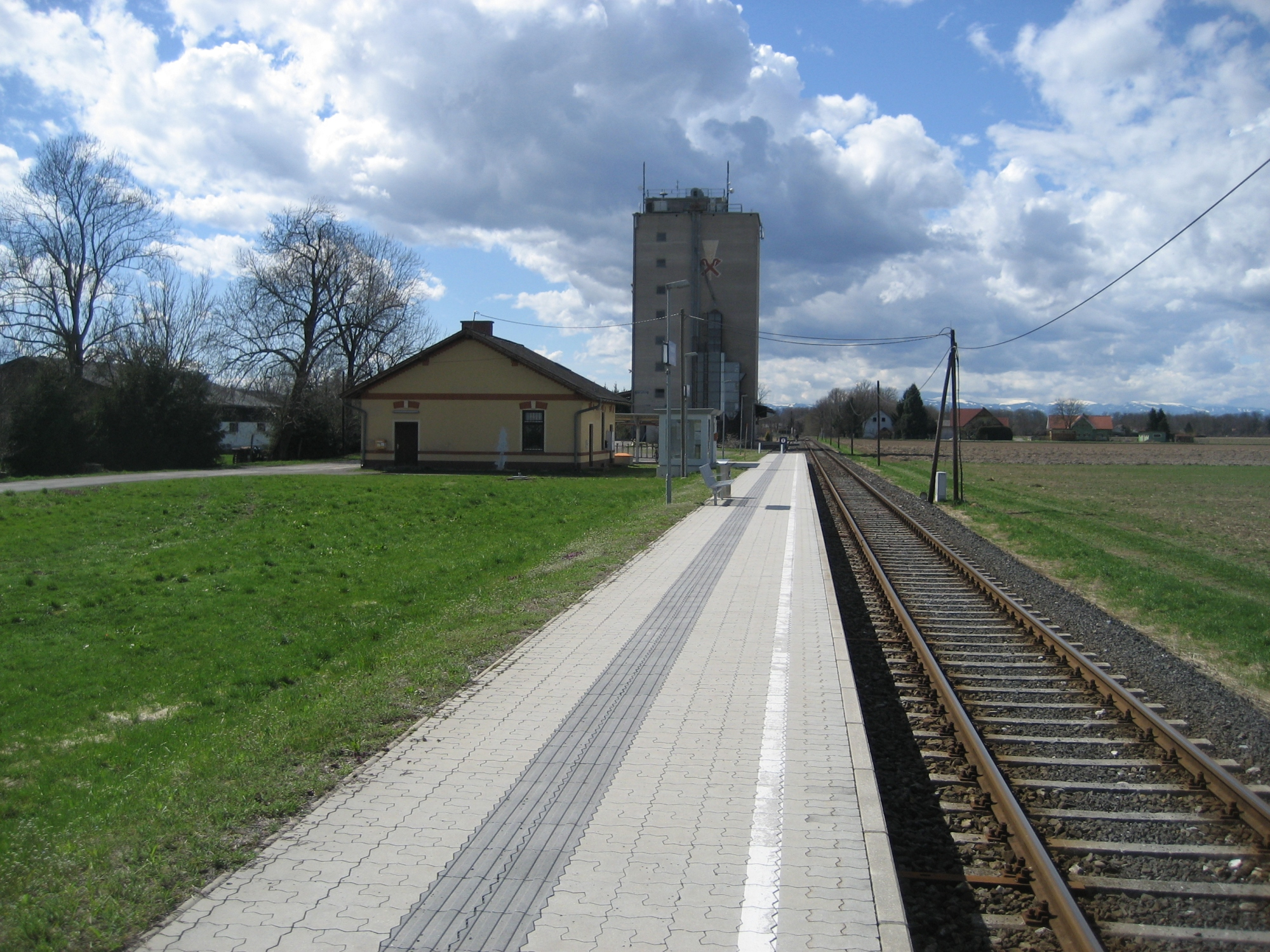
Weitersfeld an der Mur-Bf-02

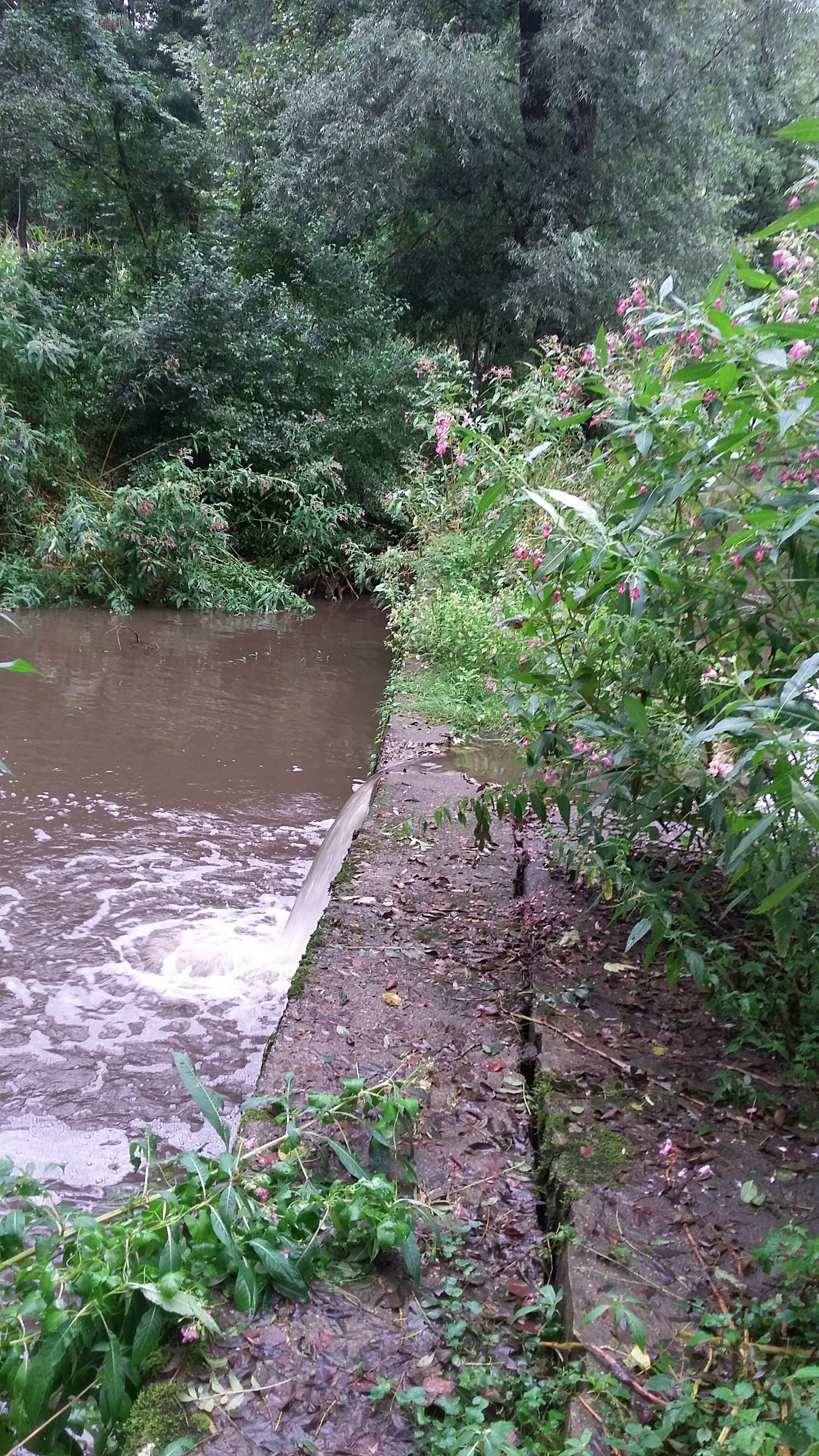
Abtrennung Mühlbach

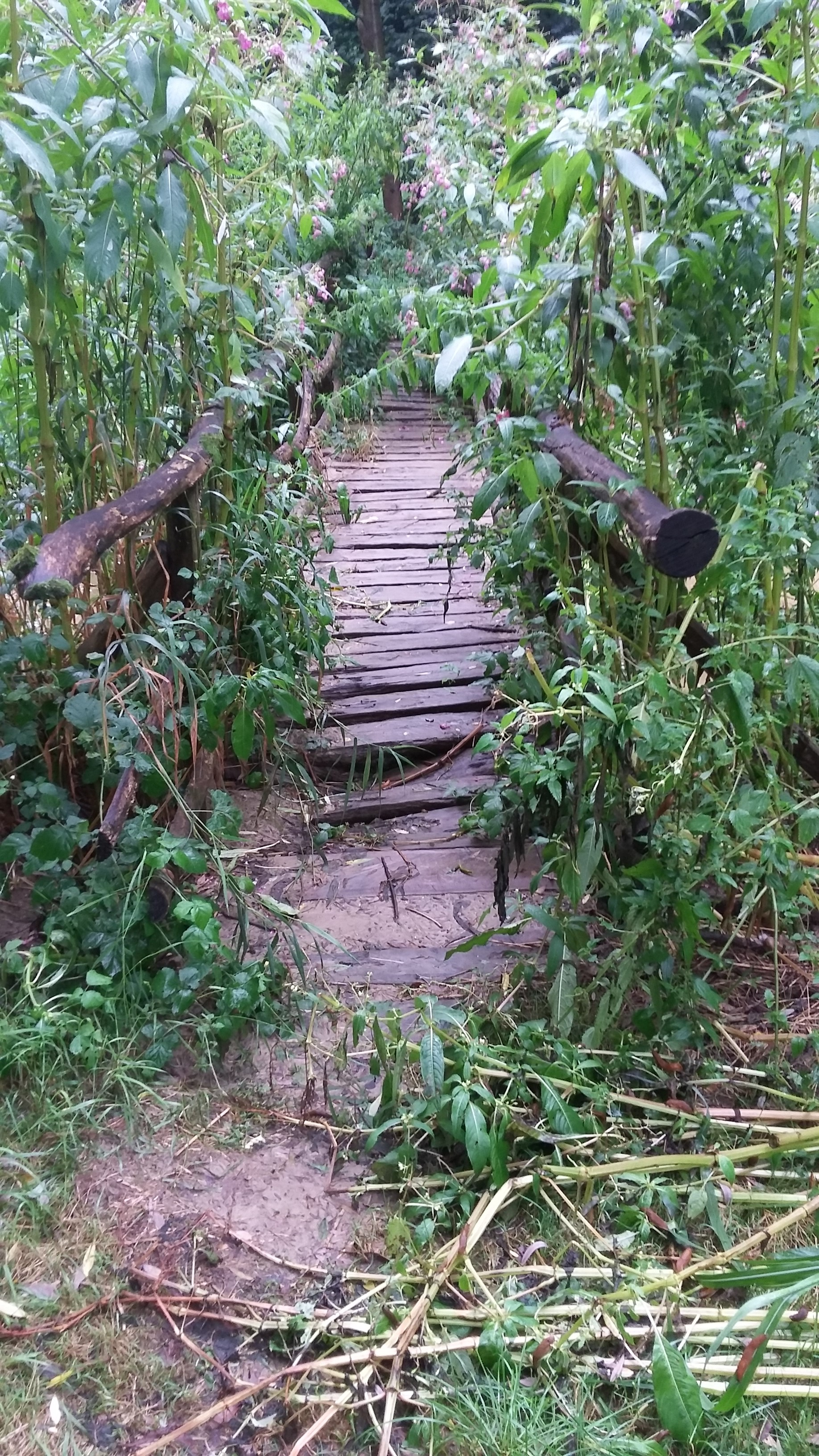
Brücke Schwarzaubach

Murfeld was the southernmost municipality of the Austrian district of Südoststeiermark. As of January 1, 2020, the Municipality was split between the Municipalities of Sankt Veit am Vogau (new code 61060) (to the north) and Straß in Steiermark (new code 61061), to the east, in the district of Leibnitz. The Catastral Subdivision of Seibersdorf bei Sankt Veit (289) merged with Sankt Veit am Vogau. The Catastral Subdivisions of Lichendorf (494), Oberschwarza (152), Unterschwarza (213) and Weitersfeld (527) merged with Straß in Steiermark.

(Murfeld is also the name of a different place: a township in the Liebenau district of Graz.)

Murfeld municipality is known for its gorgeous landscape, the Murradwanderweg (a trail for bicycles along the River Mur), its agriculture, a tiny grocery store and the widely known Murfähre (a ferry across the River Mur).

== Former Subdivisions ==
- Lichendorf (494)
- Oberschwarza (152)
- Seibersdorf bei Sankt Veit (289)
- Unterschwarza (213)
- Weitersfeld (527)

Murfeld is the name of the municipality, it is not named after a settlement. Therefore, there is no town called Murfeld.

== Population ==
Historical population

| Year | Pop. | ±% |
|---|---|---|
| 1869 | 1,788 | — |
| 1880 | 1,899 | +6.2% |
| 1890 | 1,924 | +1.3% |
| 1900 | 1,847 | −4.0% |
| 1910 | 1,934 | +4.7% |
| 1923 | 1,920 | −0.7% |
| 1934 | 1,944 | +1.2% |
| 1939 | 1,833 | −5.7% |
| 1951 | 1,899 | +3.6% |

| Year | Pop. | ±% |
|---|---|---|
| 1961 | 1,731 | −8.8% |
| 1971 | 1,809 | +4.5% |
| 1981 | 1,727 | −4.5% |
| 1991 | 1,695 | −1.9% |
| 2001 | 1,704 | +0.5% |
| 2012 | 1,666 | −2.2% |
| 2013 | 1,682 | +1.0% |
| 2015 | 1,655 | −1.6% |

== Politics ==
=== Municipal Council ===
The Municipal council consists of 15 members and since 2015 of the following mandates:

- 6 ÖVP - sets the mayor
- 5 Bürgerliste Murfeld - sets the financial representative
- 3 SPÖ
- 1 FPÖ

== Communities and organisations ==
=== Fire department ===
The fire department of Oberschwarza is responsible to guard Oberschwarza and Seibersdorf. In 2007 the fire departments of Oberschwarza and Unterschwarza finished constructing a new fire-station, which was built jointly by both fire departments. The following fire departments are present in Murfeld:

- FF Lichendof
- FF Weitersfeld
- FF Unterschwarza
- FF Oberschwarza

=== Sports clubs ===
- SVU Romann Murfeld
- SG Oberschwarza
- Sportgemeinschaft Seibersdorf
- ESV Seibersdorf
- ESV Unterschwarza
- ESV Weitersfeld

=== Charity clubs ===
- Murfelder Adventlauf
