= Edelsbach bei Feldbach =

- Municipality
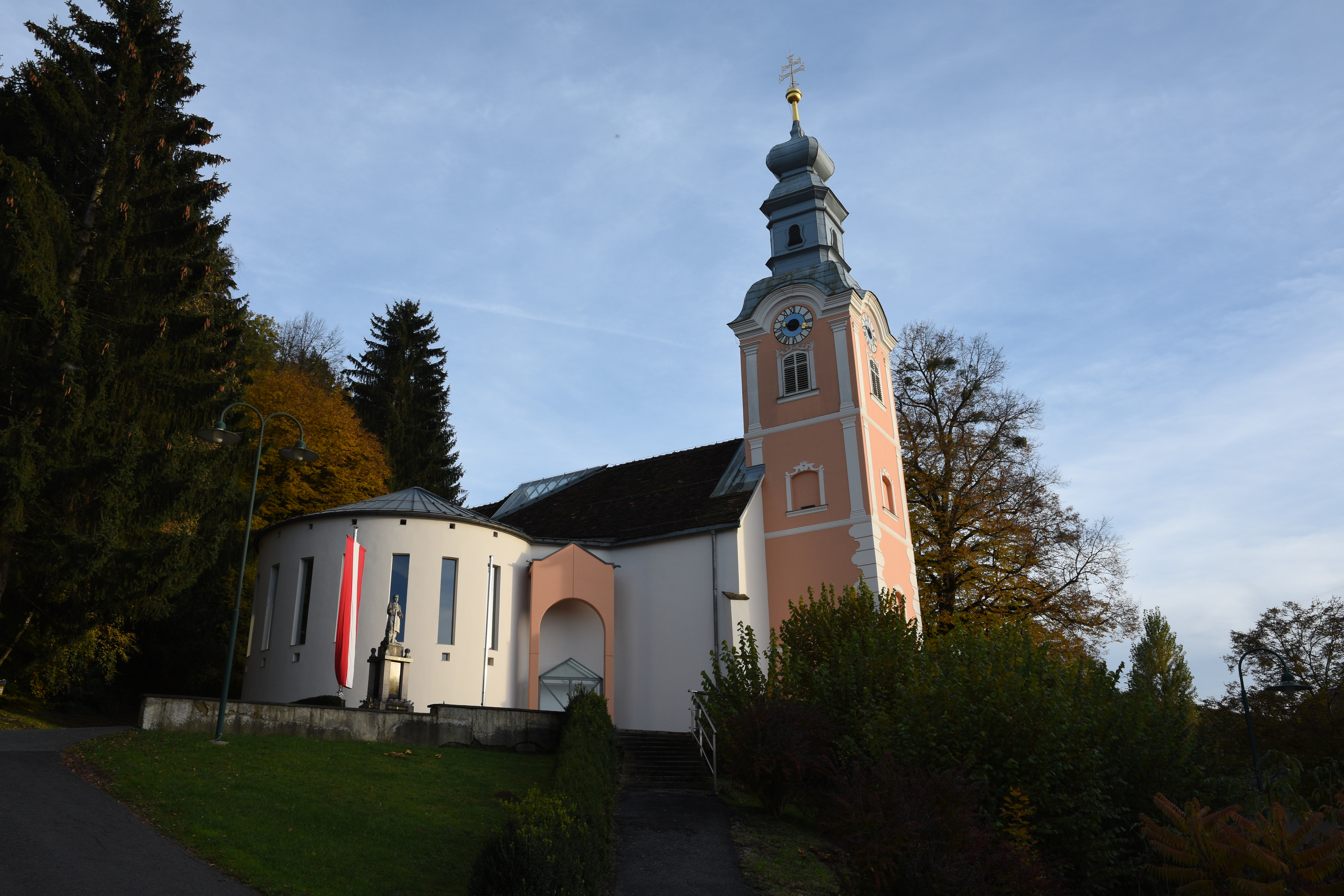
- Edelsbach parish church

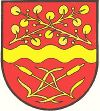
- Coat of arms

- Location within Austria
- Coordinates: 46°59′00″N 15°50′00″E
- Country: Austria
- State: Styria
- District: Feldbach

Government
  - Mayor: Alfred Buchgraber (ÖVP)

Area
  - Total: 16.09 km^{2} (6.21 sq mi)
- Elevation: 328 m (1,076 ft)

Population (2018-01-01)
  - Total: 1,342
  - Density: 83.41/km^{2} (216.0/sq mi)
- Time zone: UTC+1 (CET)
  - Summer (DST): UTC+2 (CEST)
- Postal code: 8332
- Area code: +43 3152
- Vehicle registration: FB
- Website: www.edelsbach.at

Edelsbach bei Feldbach is a municipality in the district of Südoststeiermark in the Austrian state of Styria.

== Population ==
Historical population
Year	Pop.	±%
1869	1,191	—
1880	1,209	+1.5%
1890	1,223	+1.2%
1900	1,237	+1.1%
1910	1,299	+5.0%
1923	1,270	−2.2%
1934	1,321	+4.0%
1939	1,308	−1.0%
1951	1,354	+3.5%
1961	1,239	−8.5%
1971	1,295	+4.5%
1981	1,295	+0.0%
1991	1,309	+1.1%
2001	1,371	+4.7%
2013	1,365	−0.4%
