= Pirching am Traubenberg =

- Municipality
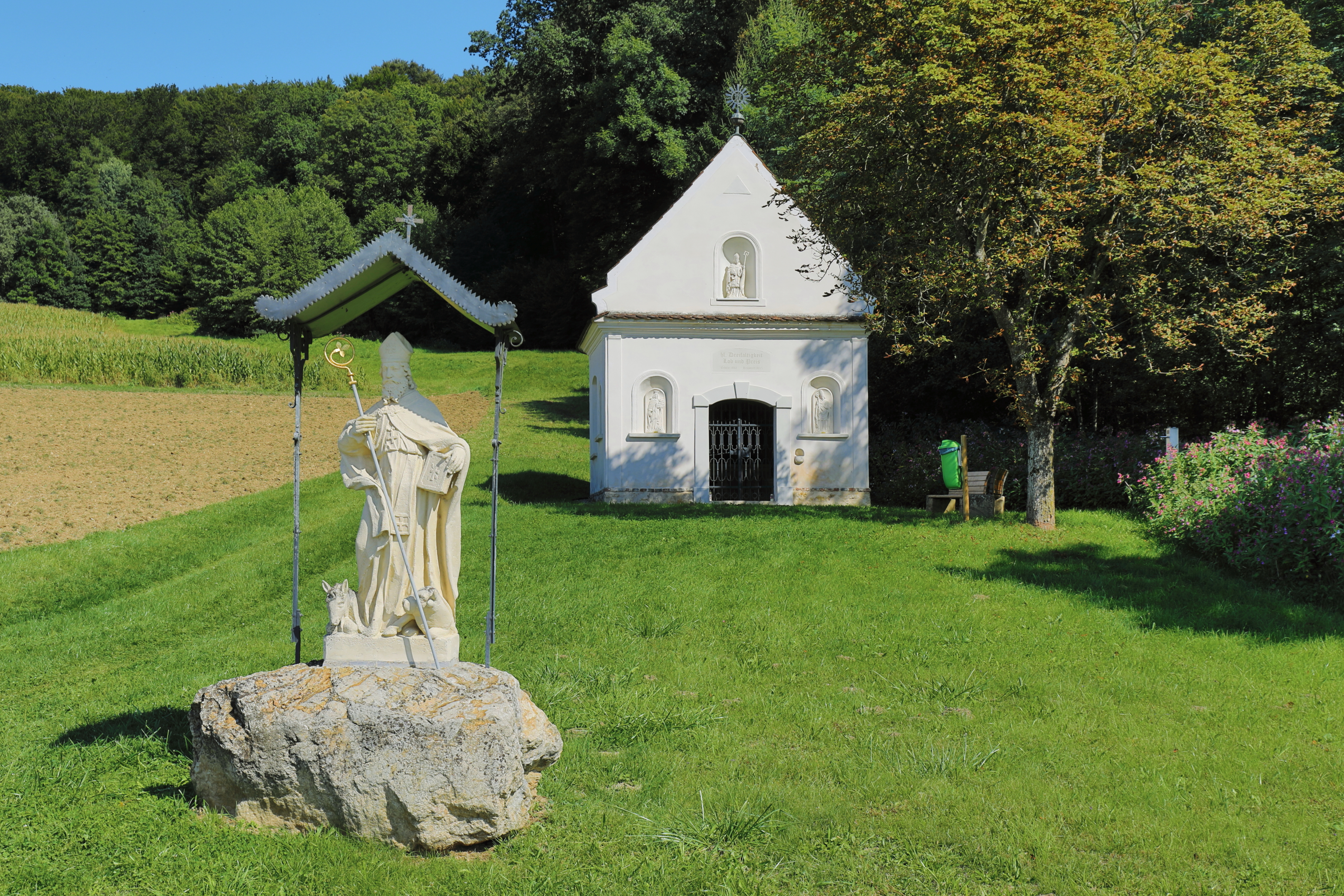
- Chapel and statue in Pirching

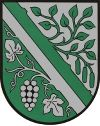
- Coat of arms

- Location within Austria
- Coordinates: 46°57′00″N 15°36′00″E
- Country: Austria
- State: Styria
- District: Südoststeiermark

Government
  - Mayor: Franz Matzer (ÖVP)

Area
  - Total: 31.5 km^{2} (12.2 sq mi)
- Elevation: 350 m (1,150 ft)

Population (2018-01-01)
  - Total: 2,567
  - Density: 81.5/km^{2} (211/sq mi)
- Time zone: UTC+1 (CET)
  - Summer (DST): UTC+2 (CEST)
- Postal code: 8081
- Area code: +43 3134
- Vehicle registration: FB
- Website: www.pirching-traubenberg.gv.at

Pirching am Traubenberg is a municipality in the district of Südoststeiermark in the Austrian state of Styria.

== Population ==
Historical population
Year	Pop.	±%
1869	1,221	—
1880	1,242	+1.7%
1890	1,200	−3.4%
1900	1,158	−3.5%
1910	1,161	+0.3%
1923	1,157	−0.3%
1934	1,168	+1.0%
1939	1,093	−6.4%
1951	1,099	+0.5%
1961	1,079	−1.8%
1971	1,120	+3.8%
1981	1,188	+6.1%
1991	1,282	+7.9%
2001	1,440	+12.3%
2013	1,610	+11.8%
