= Kapfenstein =

- Municipality
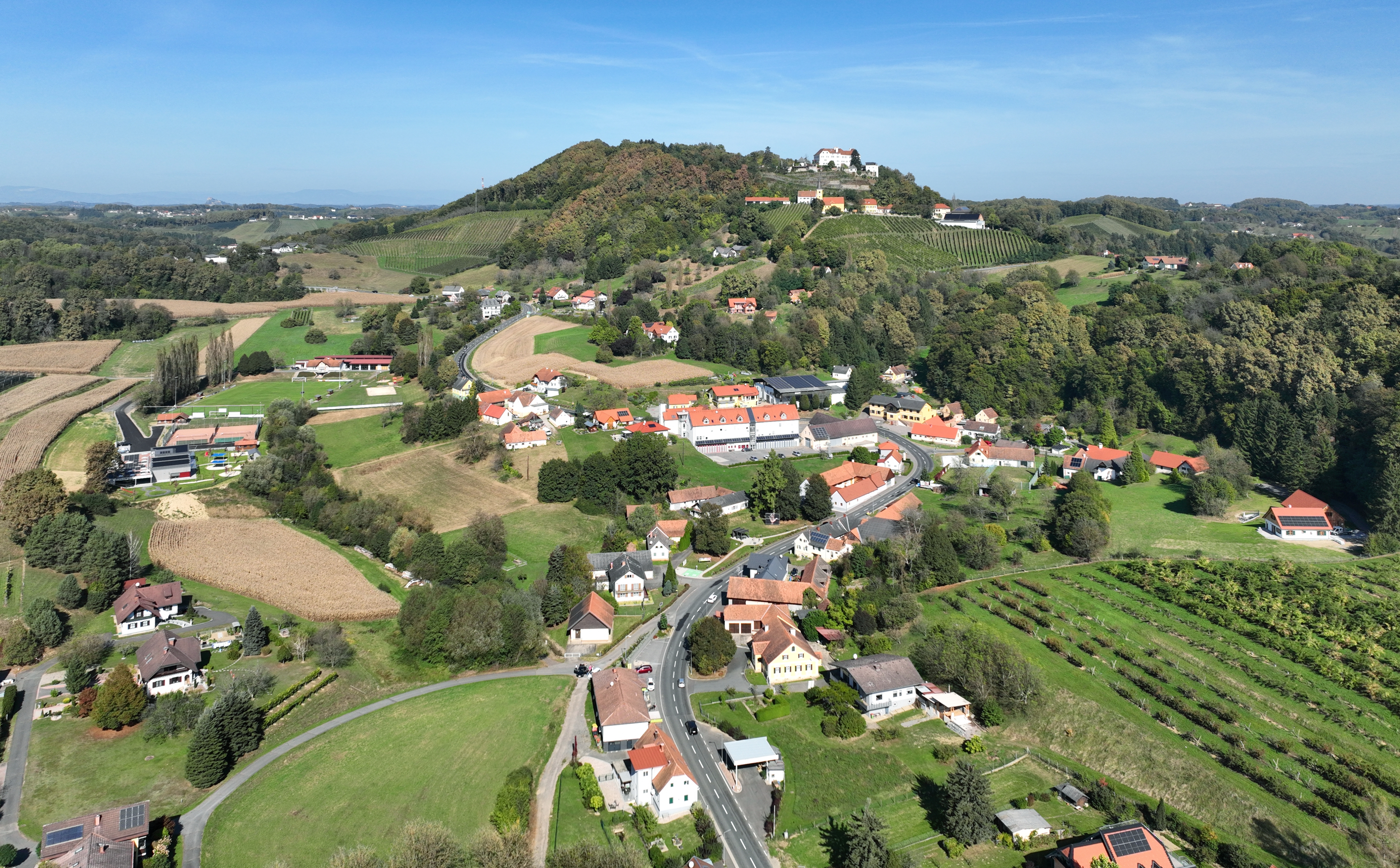
- South view of Kapfenstein

- Coat of arms

- Location within Austria
- Coordinates: 46°53′00″N 15°58′00″E
- Country: Austria
- State: Styria
- District: Südoststeiermark

Government
  - Mayor: Franz Nell (ÖVP)

Area
  - Total: 28.62 km^{2} (11.05 sq mi)
- Elevation: 300 m (980 ft)

Population (2018-01-01)
  - Total: 1,557
  - Density: 54.40/km^{2} (140.9/sq mi)
- Time zone: UTC+1 (CET)
  - Summer (DST): UTC+2 (CEST)
- Postal code: 8353
- Area code: +43 3157
- Vehicle registration: FB
- Website: www.kapfenstein.at

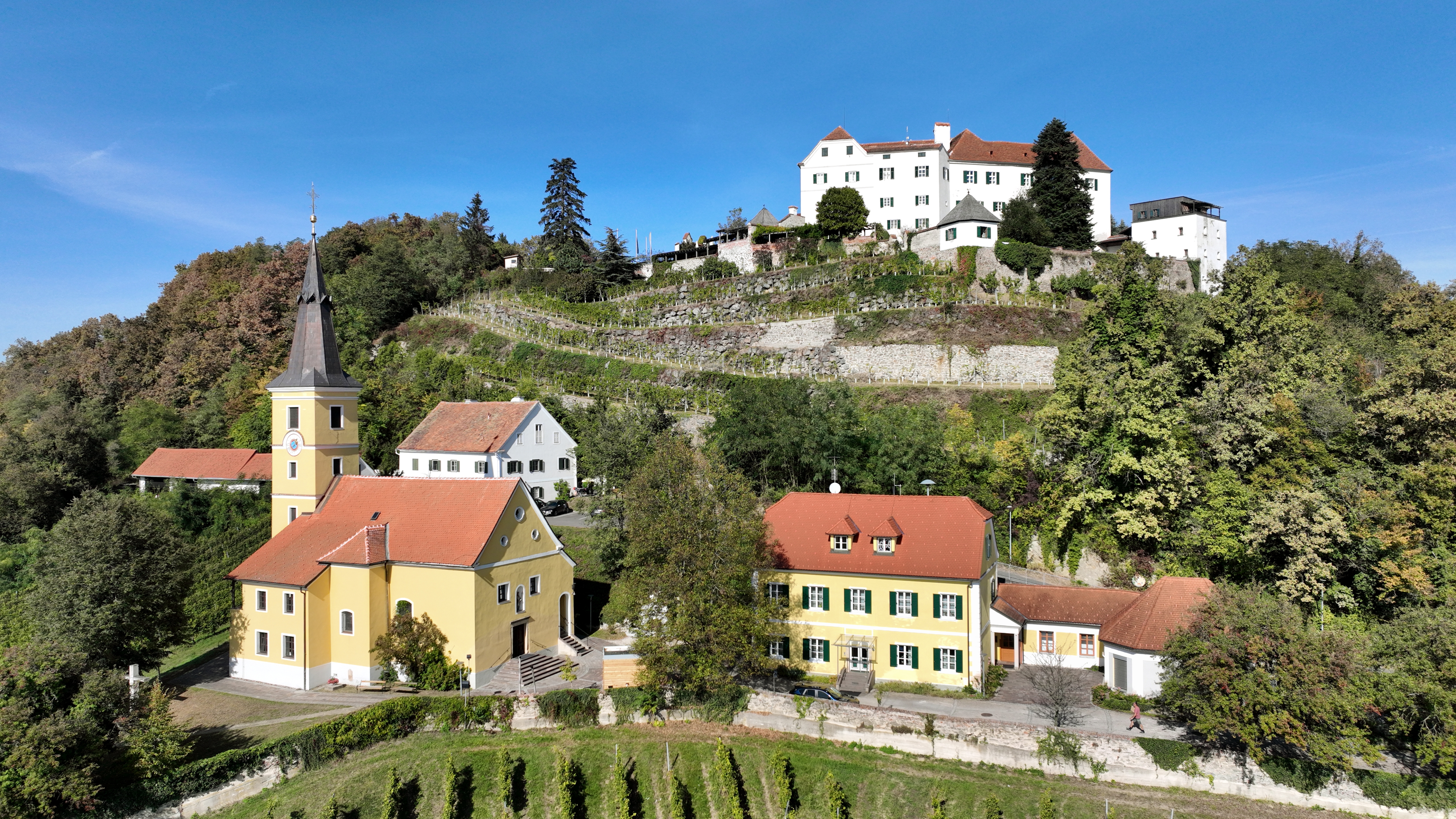
Kapfenstein castle and parish church

Kapfenstein is a municipality in the district of Südoststeiermark in the Austrian state of Styria.

== Population ==
Historical population
Year	Pop.	±%
1869	2,286	—
1880	2,258	−1.2%
1890	2,299	+1.8%
1900	2,235	−2.8%
1910	2,187	−2.1%
1923	2,112	−3.4%
1934	2,057	−2.6%
1939	1,926	−6.4%
1951	1,877	−2.5%
1961	1,891	+0.7%
1971	1,917	+1.4%
1981	1,880	−1.9%
1991	1,754	−6.7%
2001	1,691	−3.6%
2013	1,615	−4.5%
