= Bad Gleichenberg =

- Municipality
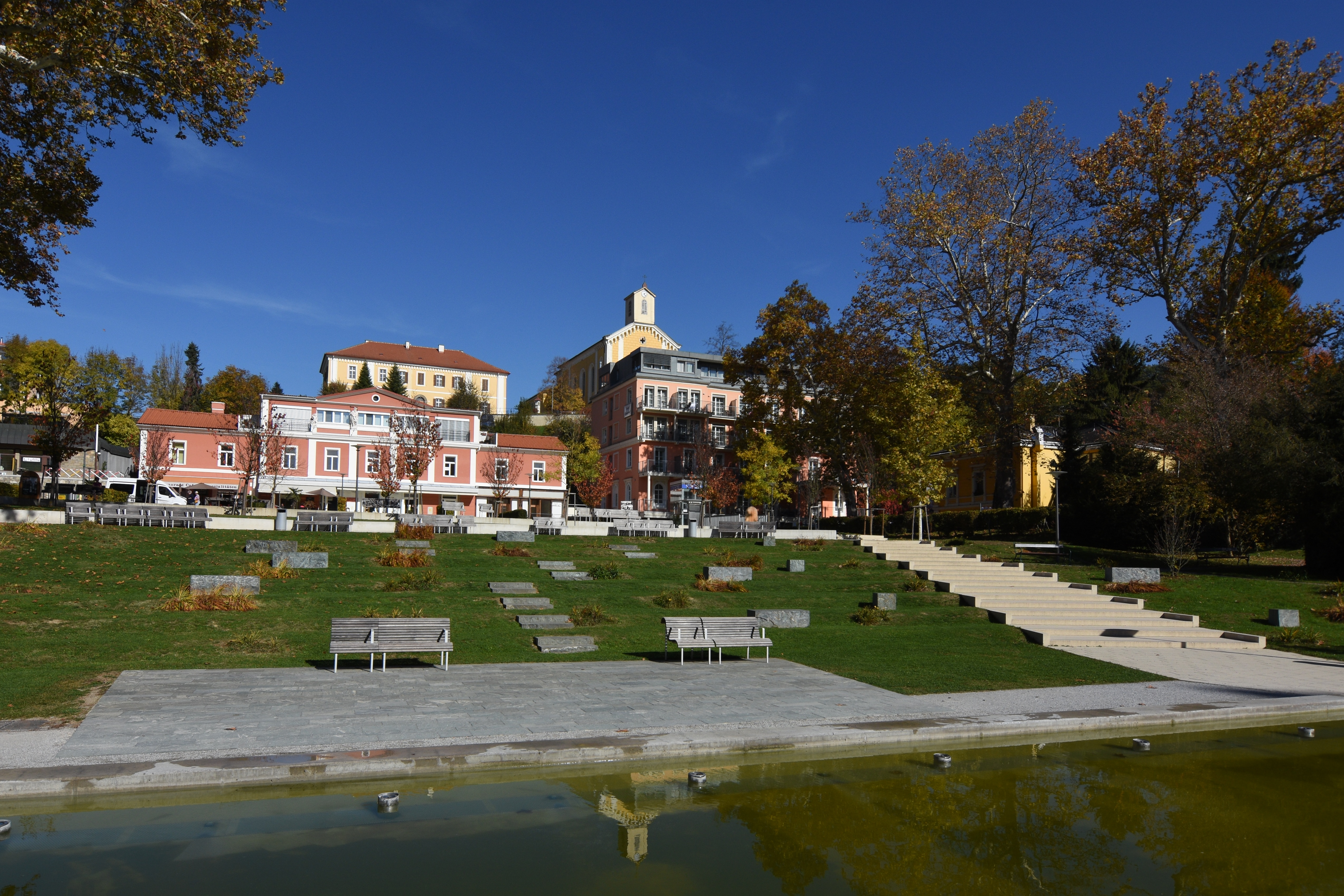
- Centre of Bad Gleichenberg

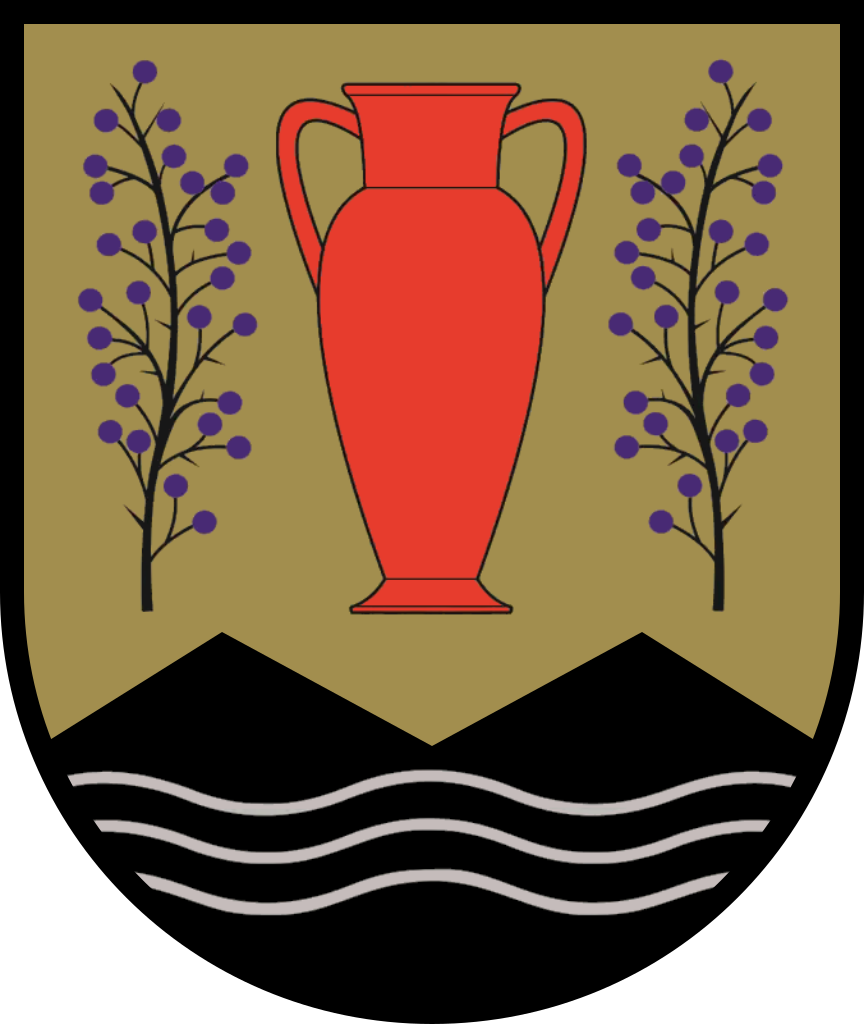
- Coat of arms

- Location within Austria
- Coordinates: 46°52′00″N 15°54′00″E
- Country: Austria
- State: Styria
- District: Südoststeiermark

Government
  - Mayor: Michael Karl (ÖVP)

Area
  - Total: 38.72 km^{2} (14.95 sq mi)
- Elevation: 317 m (1,040 ft)

Population (2018-01-01)
  - Total: 5,314
  - Density: 137.2/km^{2} (355.5/sq mi)
- Time zone: UTC+1 (CET)
  - Summer (DST): UTC+2 (CEST)
- Postal code: 8344, 8343
- Area code: +43 3159
- Vehicle registration: FB
- Website: https://www.bad-gleichenberg.gv.at/

Bad Gleichenberg is a municipality in the district of Südoststeiermark in the Austrian state of Styria.

== Population ==
Historical population
Year	Pop.	±%
1869	3,754	—
1880	4,336	+15.5%
1890	4,718	+8.8%
1900	4,495	−4.7%
1910	4,271	−5.0%
1923	4,058	−5.0%
1934	4,171	+2.8%
1939	4,110	−1.5%
1951	4,323	+5.2%
1961	4,395	+1.7%
1971	4,701	+7.0%
1981	4,633	−1.4%
1991	4,883	+5.4%
2001	5,174	+6.0%
2011	5,302	+2.5%
2021	5,173	−2.4%
