= Gnas, Styria =

Gnas
- Municipality
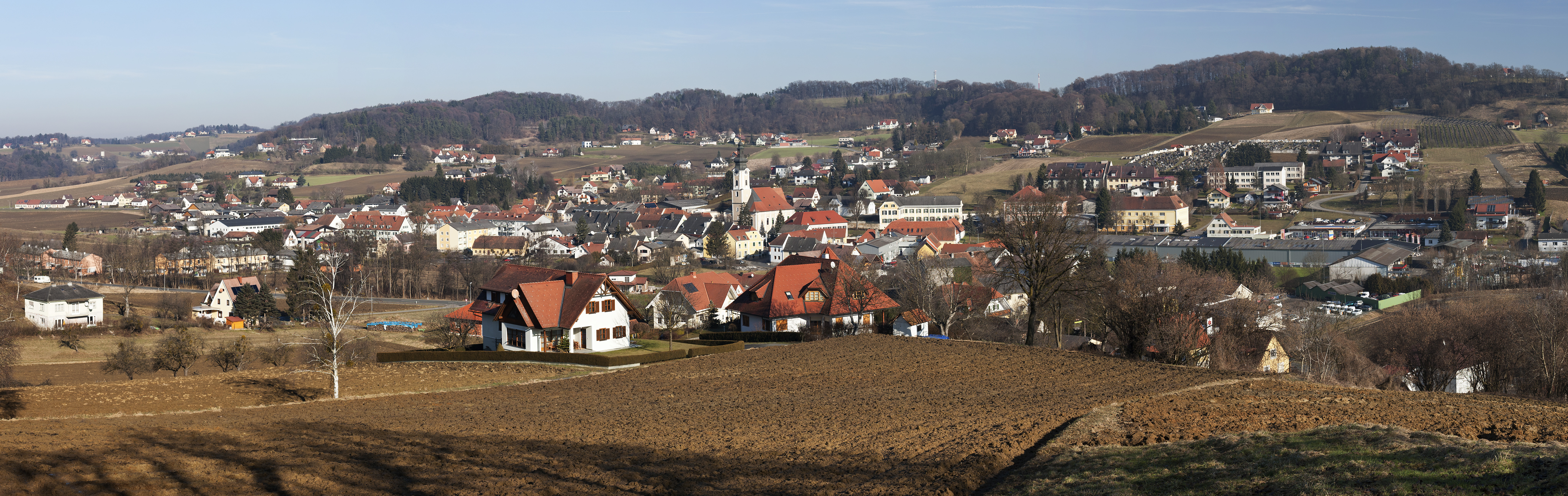
- Gnas viewed from the west

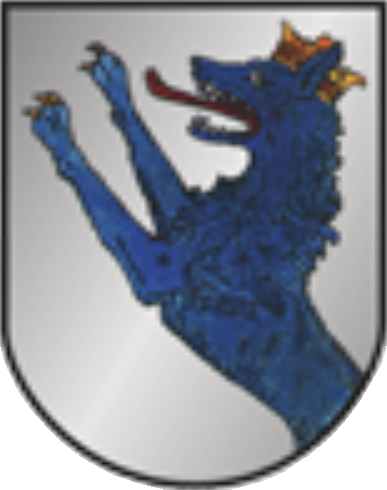
- Coat of arms

- Location within Austria
- Coordinates: 46°52′00″N 15°50′00″E
- Country: Austria
- State: Styria
- District: Südoststeiermark

Government
  - Mayor: Gerhard Meixner (ÖVP)

Area
  - Total: 81.37 km^{2} (31.42 sq mi)
- Elevation: 279 m (915 ft)

Population (2018-01-01)
  - Total: 6,046
  - Density: 74.30/km^{2} (192.4/sq mi)
- Time zone: UTC+1 (CET)
  - Summer (DST): UTC+2 (CEST)
- Postal code: 8342
- Area code: +43 3151
- Vehicle registration: FB
- Website: www.gnas.at

Gnas is a municipality in the district of Südoststeiermark in the Austrian state of Styria.

== Population ==
All figures based on the 2015 area.

Historical population
| Year | Pop. | ±% |
|---|---|---|
| 1869 | 7,048 | — |
| 1880 | 7,443 | +5.6% |
| 1890 | 7,416 | −0.4% |
| 1900 | 6,988 | −5.8% |
| 1910 | 6,729 | −3.7% |
| 1923 | 6,575 | −2.3% |
| 1934 | 6,743 | +2.6% |
| 1939 | 6,471 | −4.0% |
| 1951 | 6,241 | −3.6% |
| 1961 | 6,129 | −1.8% |
| 1971 | 6,446 | +5.2% |
| 1981 | 6,548 | +1.6% |
| 1991 | 6,481 | −1.0% |
| 2001 | 6,415 | −1.0% |
| 2019 | 6,016 | −6.2% |
