= Klöch =

- Municipality
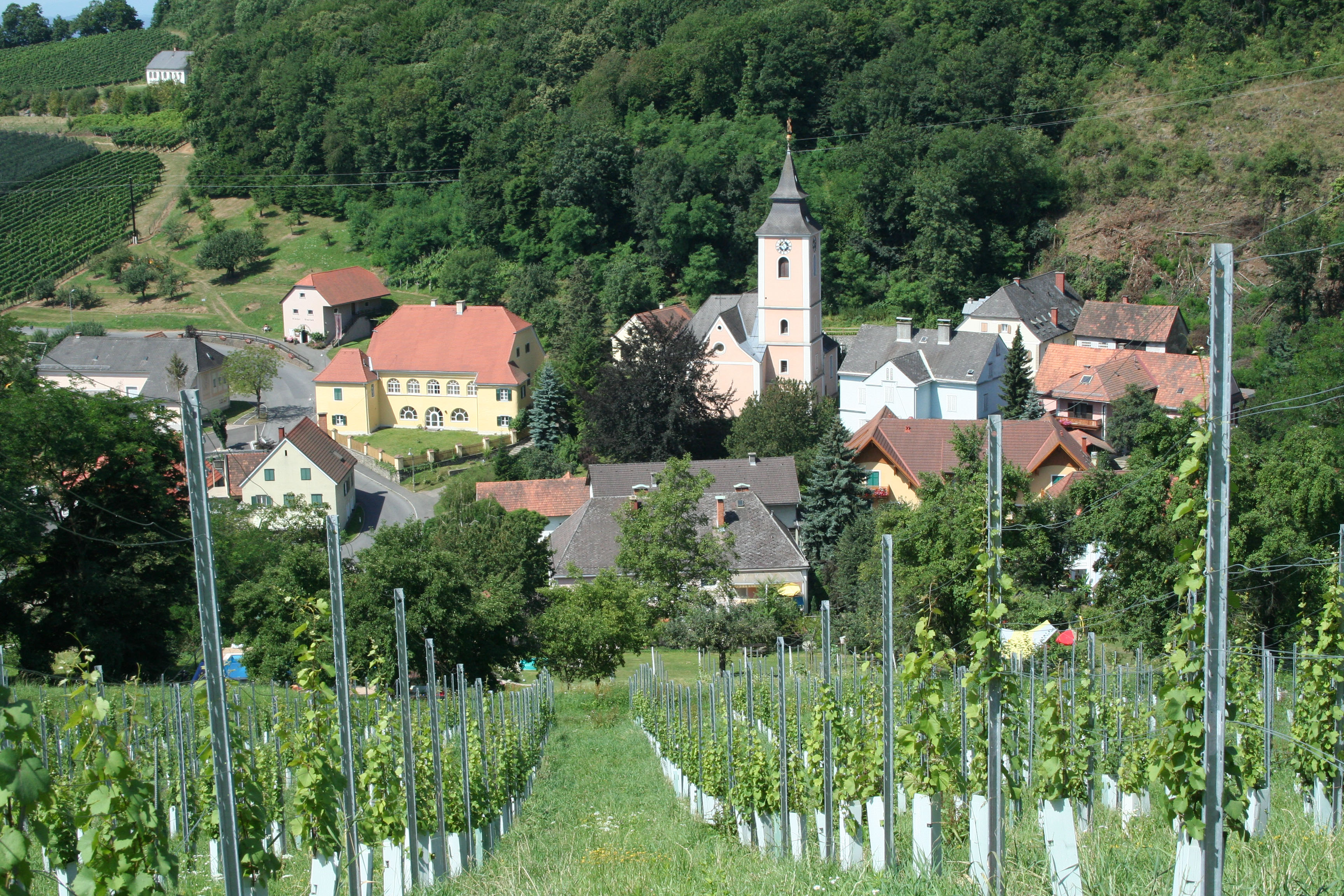
- View of Klöch

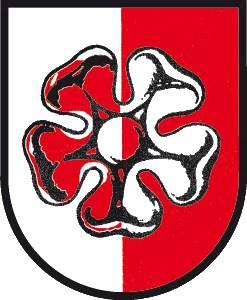
- Coat of arms

- Location within Austria
- Coordinates: 46°46′00″N 15°58′00″E
- Country: Austria
- State: Styria
- District: Südoststeiermark

Government
  - Mayor: Josef Doupona (ÖVP)

Area
  - Total: 16.4 km^{2} (6.3 sq mi)
- Elevation: 290 m (950 ft)

Population (2018-01-01)
  - Total: 1,192
  - Density: 72.7/km^{2} (188/sq mi)
- Time zone: UTC+1 (CET)
  - Summer (DST): UTC+2 (CEST)
- Postal code: 8493
- Area code: 03475
- Vehicle registration: RA
- Website: www.kloech.com

Klöch is a municipality in the district of Südoststeiermark in the Austrian state of Styria.

== Population ==
Historical population
Year	Pop.	±%
1869	1,398	—
1880	1,402	+0.3%
1890	1,497	+6.8%
1900	1,421	−5.1%
1910	1,452	+2.2%
1923	1,482	+2.1%
1934	1,538	+3.8%
1939	1,368	−11.1%
1951	1,658	+21.2%
1961	1,453	−12.4%
1971	1,393	−4.1%
1981	1,370	−1.7%
1991	1,318	−3.8%
2001	1,329	+0.8%
2012	1,223	−8.0%
