= Kirchberg an der Raab =

- Municipality
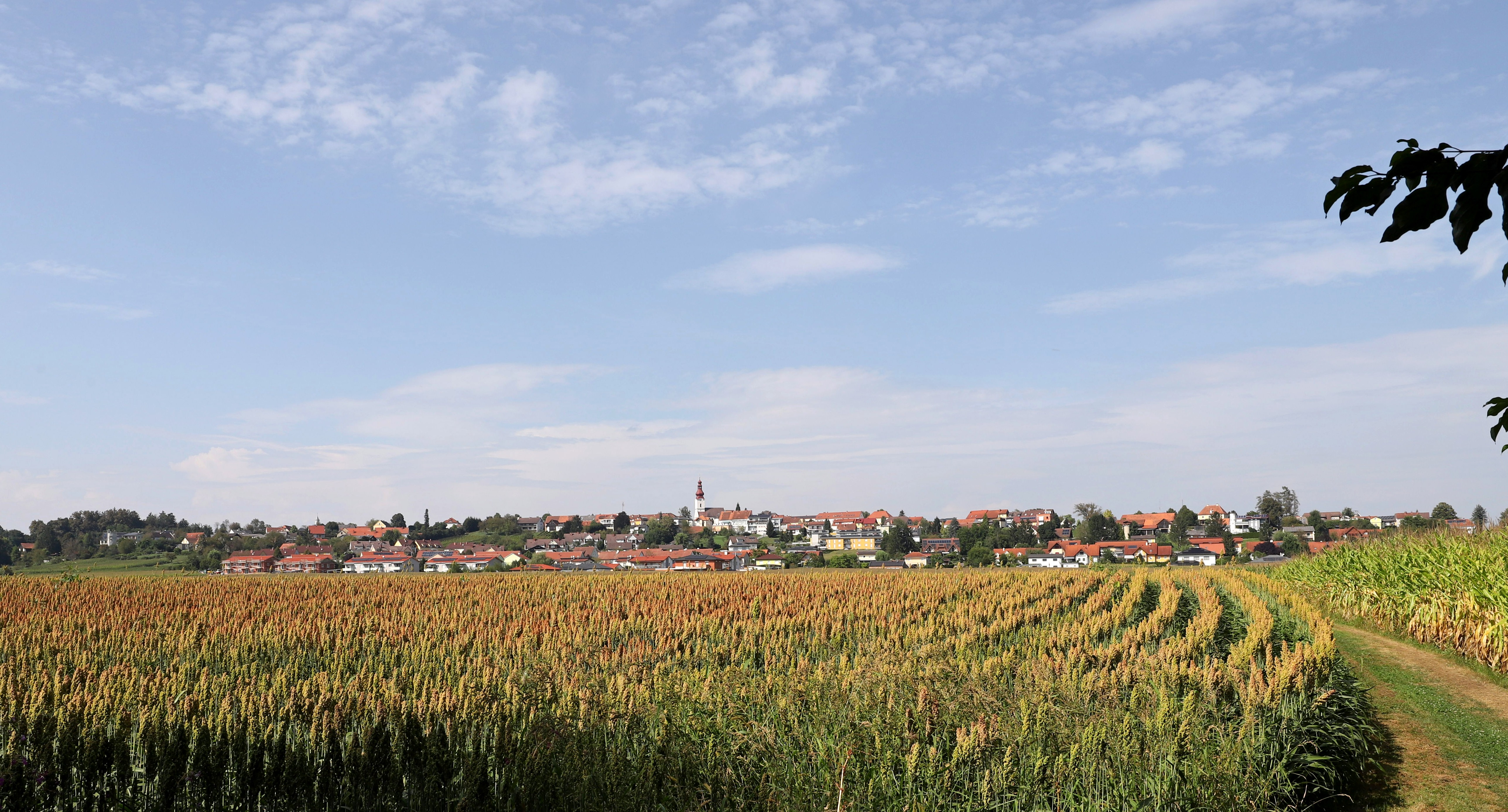
- Kirchberg Castle

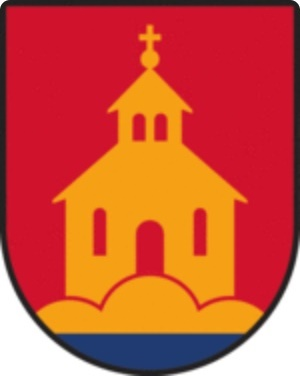
- Coat of arms

- Location within Austria Location within Styria
- Coordinates: 46°59′00″N 15°46′00″E
- Country: Austria
- State: Styria
- District: Südoststeiermark

Government
  - Mayor: Helmut Ofner (ÖVP)

Area
  - Total: 43.79 km^{2} (16.91 sq mi)
- Elevation: 370 m (1,210 ft)

Population (2018-01-01)
  - Total: 4,488
  - Density: 102.5/km^{2} (265.4/sq mi)
- Time zone: UTC+1 (CET)
  - Summer (DST): UTC+2 (CEST)
- Postal code: 8324
- Area code: +43 3115
- Vehicle registration: SO
- Website: www.kirchberg-raab.at

Kirchberg an der Raab is a municipality in the district of Südoststeiermark in the Austrian state of Styria.

== Population ==
Historical population
Year	Pop.	±%
1869	1,269	—
1880	1,384	+9.1%
1890	1,461	+5.6%
1900	1,508	+3.2%
1910	1,636	+8.5%
1923	1,574	−3.8%
1934	1,587	+0.8%
1939	1,519	−4.3%
1951	1,522	+0.2%
1961	1,516	−0.4%
1971	1,617	+6.7%
1981	1,623	+0.4%
1991	1,784	+9.9%
2001	1,892	+6.1%
2013	2,003	+5.9%
