= Halbenrain =

- Municipality
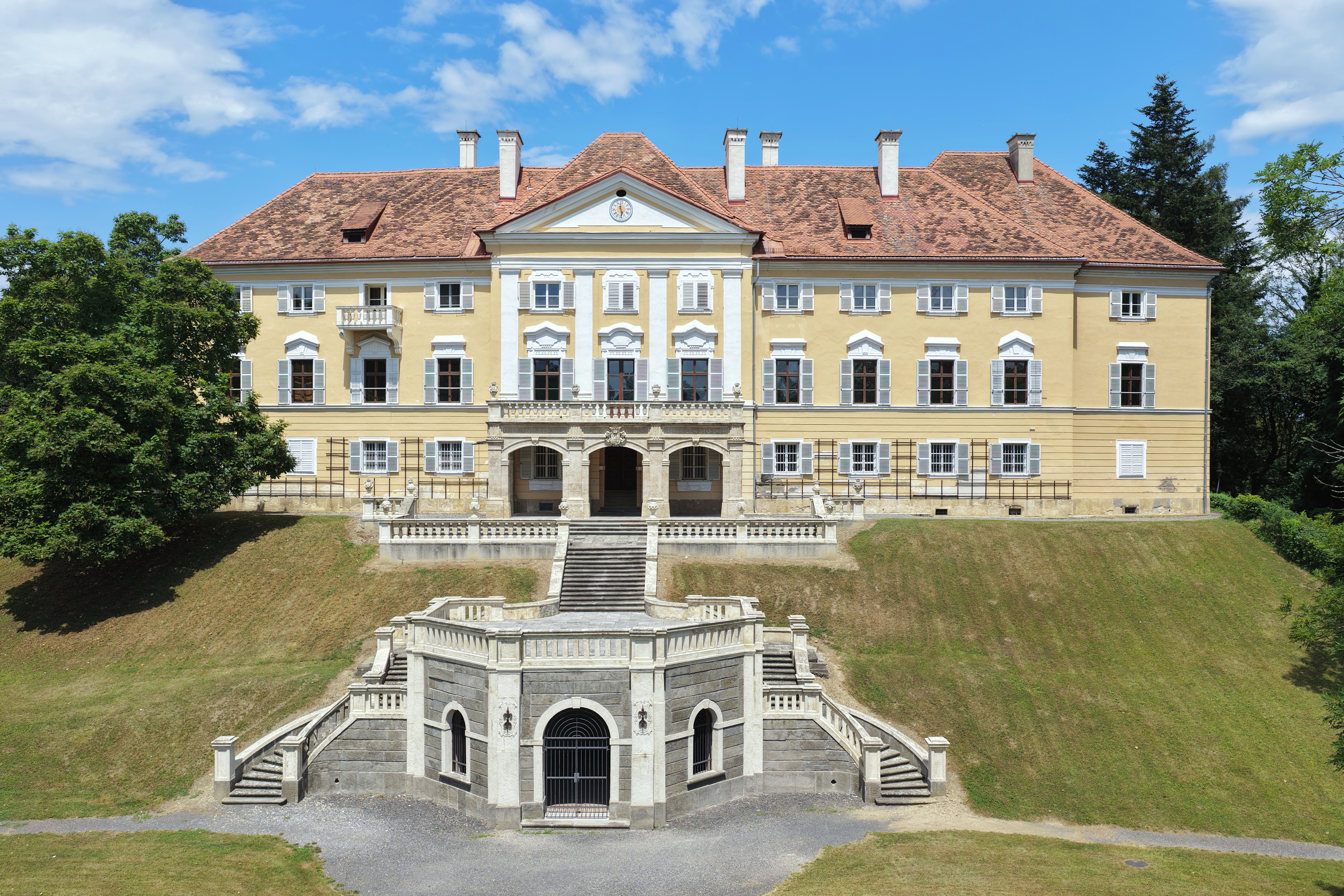
- Halbenrain Castle

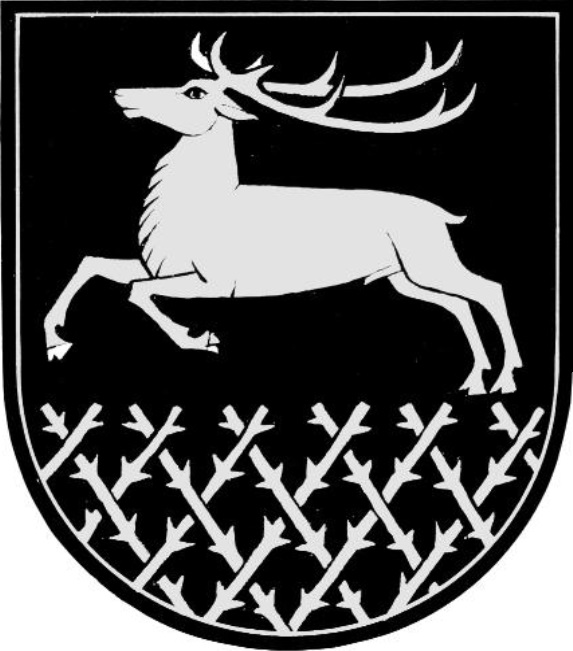
- Coat of arms

- Location within Austria Location within Styria
- Coordinates: 46°43′19″N 15°56′48″E
- Country: Austria
- State: Styria
- District: Südoststeiermark

Government
  - Mayor: Dietmar Tschiggerl (ÖVP)

Area
  - Total: 38.69 km^{2} (14.94 sq mi)
- Elevation: 223 m (732 ft)

Population (2018-01-01)
  - Total: 1,747
  - Density: 45.15/km^{2} (116.9/sq mi)
- Time zone: UTC+1 (CET)
  - Summer (DST): UTC+2 (CEST)
- Postal code: 8492
- Area code: 03476
- Vehicle registration: RA
- Website: www.halbenrain.gv.at

Halbenrain (Slovene: Obrajna) is a municipality in the district of Südoststeiermark in the Austrian state of Styria.

== Population ==
Historical population
Year	Pop.	±%
1869	2,155	—
1880	2,221	+3.1%
1890	2,362	+6.3%
1900	2,408	+1.9%
1910	2,487	+3.3%
1923	2,430	−2.3%
1934	2,285	−6.0%
1939	2,233	−2.3%
1951	2,257	+1.1%
1961	2,039	−9.7%
1971	2,030	−0.4%
1981	1,975	−2.7%
1991	1,946	−1.5%
2001	1,881	−3.3%
2012	1,786	−5.1%
