= Mettersdorf am Saßbach =

- Municipality
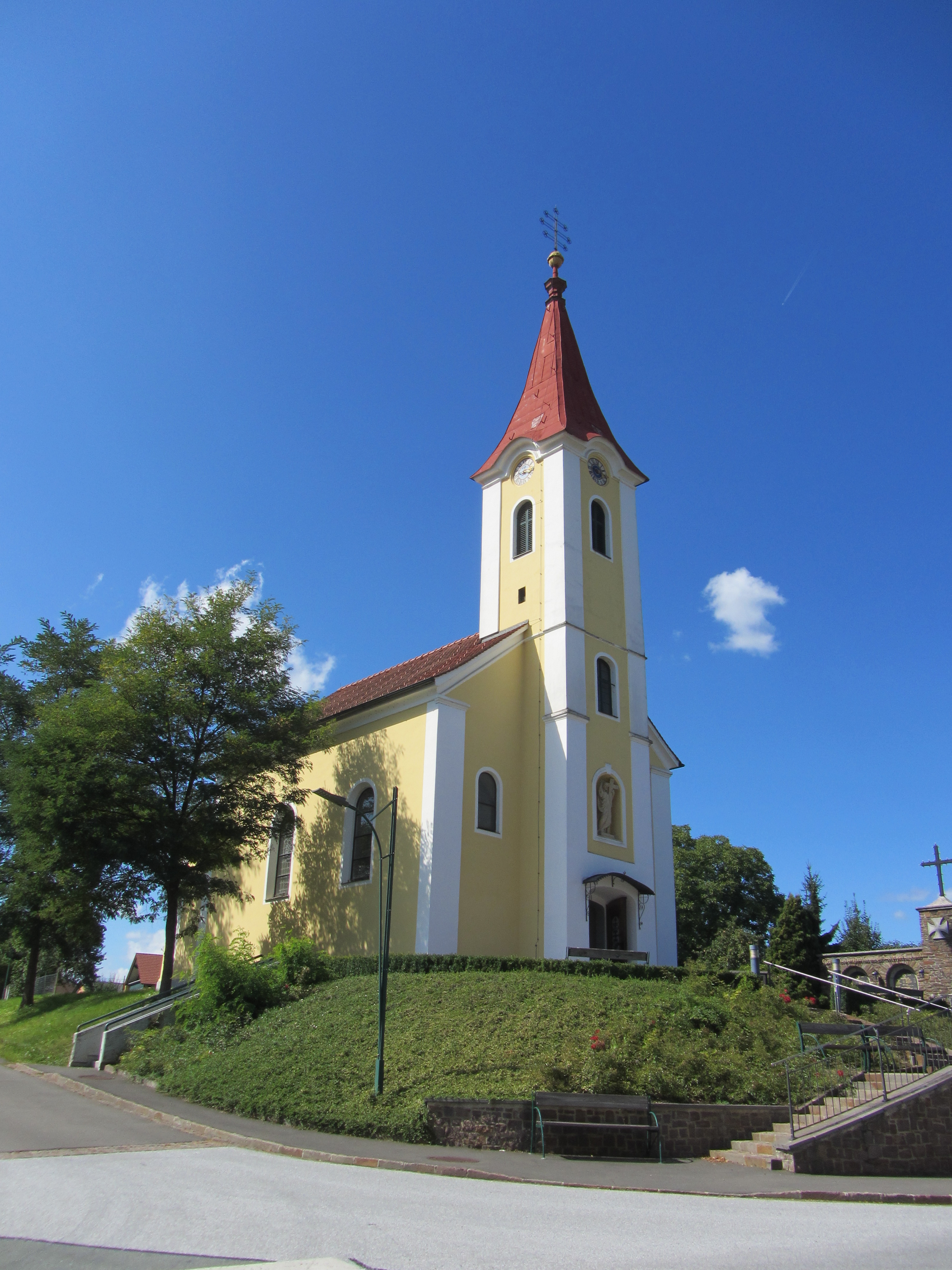
- Mettersdorf parish church

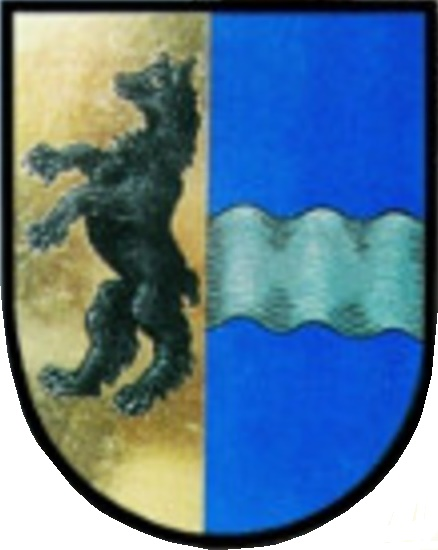
- Coat of arms

- Location within Austria
- Coordinates: 46°48′17″N 15°42′39″E
- Country: Austria
- State: Styria
- District: Südoststeiermark

Government
  - Mayor: Johann SCHWEIGLER (ÖVP)

Area
  - Total: 22.7 km^{2} (8.8 sq mi)
- Elevation: 281 m (922 ft)

Population (2018-01-01)
  - Total: 1,282
  - Density: 56.5/km^{2} (146/sq mi)
- Time zone: UTC+1 (CET)
  - Summer (DST): UTC+2 (CEST)
- Postal code: 8092
- Area code: 03477
- Vehicle registration: RA
- Website: mettersdorf-sassbach.gv.at

Mettersdorf am Saßbach is a municipality in the district of Südoststeiermark in the Austrian state of Styria.

== Population ==
Historical population
Year	Pop.	±%
1869	1,483	—
1880	1,477	−0.4%
1890	1,467	−0.7%
1900	1,480	+0.9%
1910	1,522	+2.8%
1923	1,489	−2.2%
1934	1,471	−1.2%
1939	1,381	−6.1%
1951	1,314	−4.9%
1961	1,248	−5.0%
1971	1,403	+12.4%
1981	1,454	+3.6%
1991	1,397	−3.9%
2001	1,329	−4.9%
2012	1,318	−0.8%
