= Paldau =

- Municipality
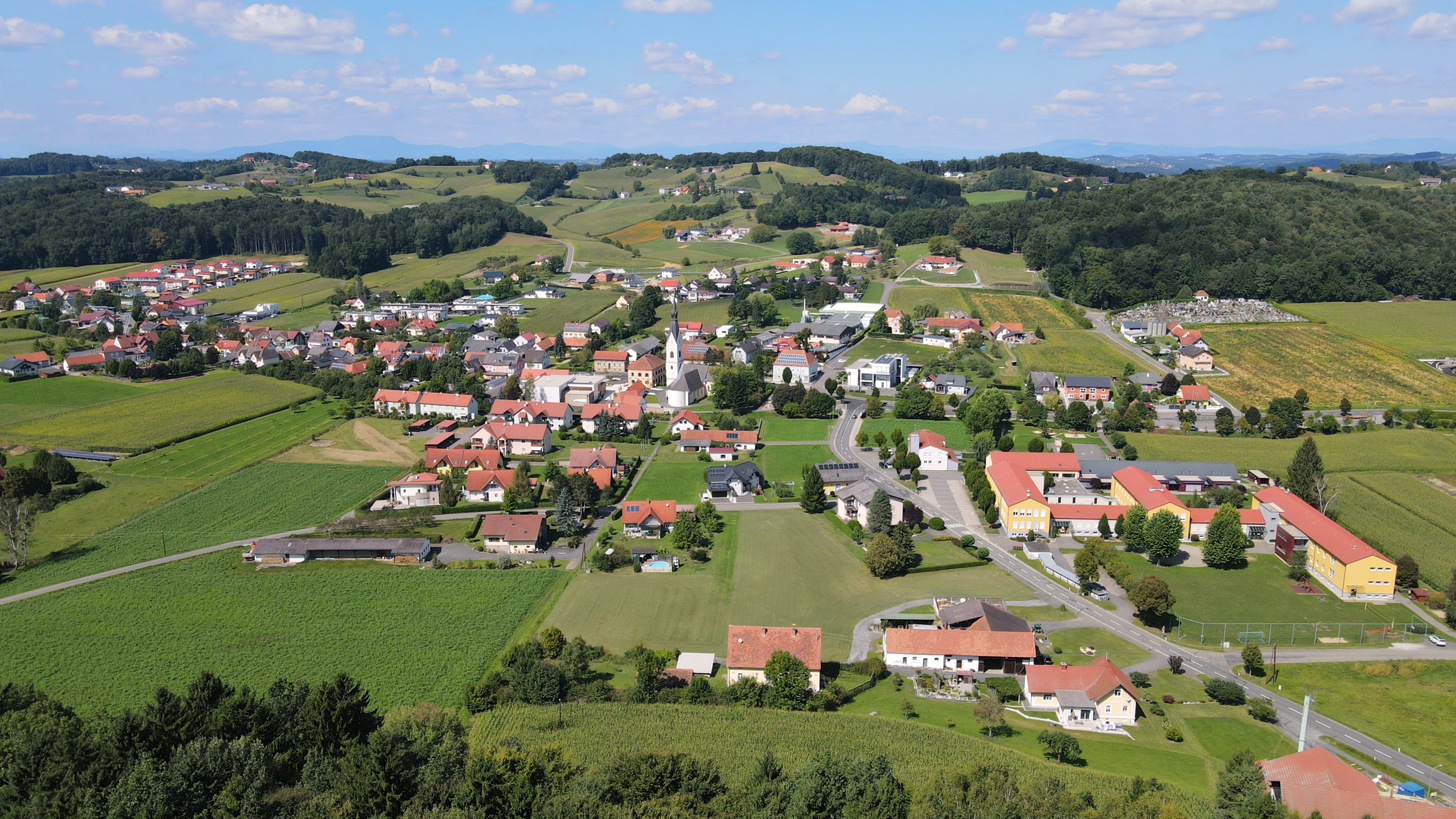
- Aerial view of Paldau

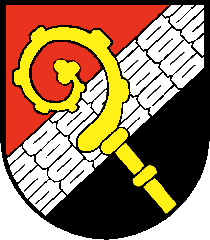
- Coat of arms

- Location within Austria
- Coordinates: 46°56′00″N 15°48′00″E
- Country: Austria
- State: Styria
- District: Südoststeiermark

Government
  - Mayor: Karl Konrad (ÖVP)

Area
  - Total: 39.12 km^{2} (15.10 sq mi)
- Elevation: 309 m (1,014 ft)

Population (2018-01-01)
  - Total: 3,130
  - Density: 80.0/km^{2} (207/sq mi)
- Time zone: UTC+1 (CET)
  - Summer (DST): UTC+2 (CEST)
- Postal code: 8341
- Area code: +43 3150
- Vehicle registration: FB
- Website: www.paldau.at

Paldau is a municipality in the district of Südoststeiermark in the Austrian state of Styria.

== Population ==
Historical population
| Year | Pop. | ±% |
|---|---|---|
| 1869 | 1,825 | — |
| 1880 | 1,957 | +7.2% |
| 1890 | 2,048 | +4.6% |
| 1900 | 1,997 | −2.5% |
| 1910 | 2,026 | +1.5% |
| 1923 | 1,973 | −2.6% |
| 1934 | 2,005 | +1.6% |
| 1939 | 1,922 | −4.1% |
| 1951 | 1,953 | +1.6% |
| 1961 | 1,940 | −0.7% |
| 1971 | 1,976 | +1.9% |
| 1981 | 1,970 | −0.3% |
| 1991 | 2,066 | +4.9% |
| 2001 | 2,081 | +0.7% |
| 2013 | 2,084 | +0.1% |
