= Straden =

- Municipality
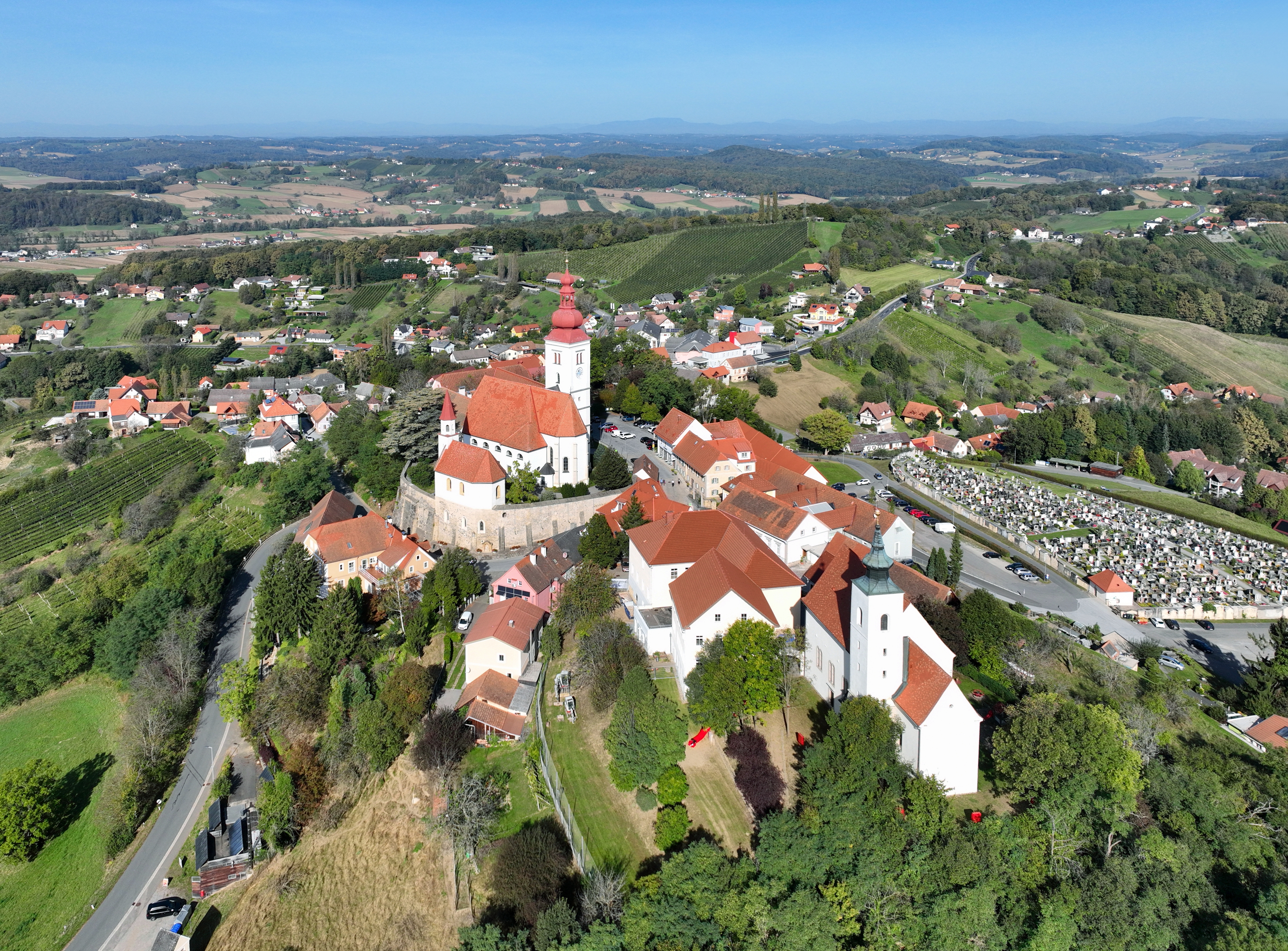
- Southeast view of Straden with the Himmelsberg in the foreground

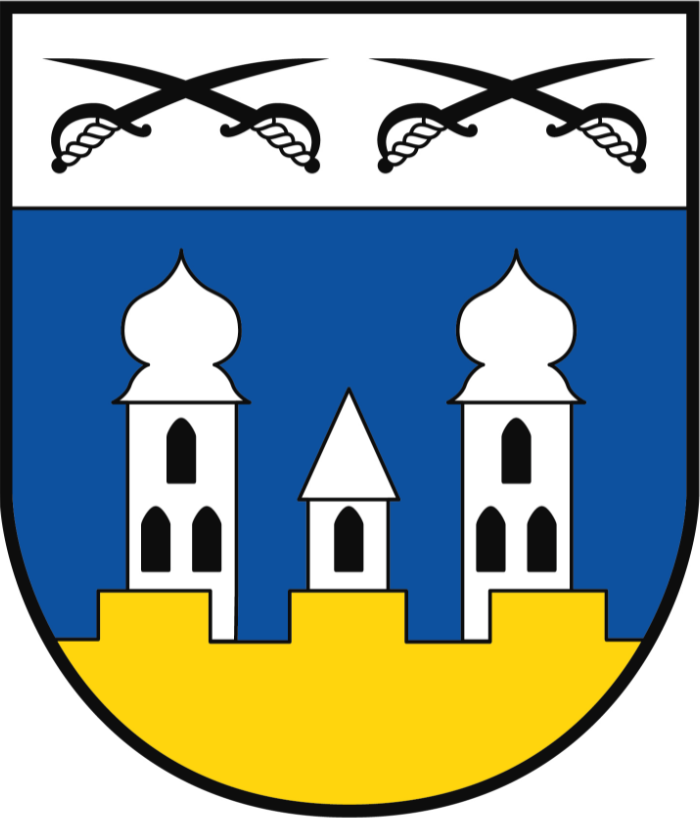
- Coat of arms

- Location within Austria
- Coordinates: 46°48′21″N 15°52′16″E
- Country: Austria
- State: Styria
- District: Südoststeiermark

Government
  - Mayor: Alfred Schuster (ÖVP)

Area
  - Total: 56.33 km^{2} (21.75 sq mi)
- Elevation: 209 m (686 ft)

Population (2018-01-01)
  - Total: 3,601
  - Density: 63.93/km^{2} (165.6/sq mi)
- Time zone: UTC+1 (CET)
  - Summer (DST): UTC+2 (CEST)
- Postal code: 8345
- Area code: 03473
- Vehicle registration: RA
- Website: www.straden.gv.at

Straden is a municipality in the district of Südoststeiermark in the Austrian state of Styria.

== Population ==
Historical population
Year	Pop.	±%
1869	2,006	—
1880	2,052	+2.3%
1890	2,075	+1.1%
1900	1,962	−5.4%
1910	1,927	−1.8%
1923	1,898	−1.5%
1934	1,901	+0.2%
1939	1,786	−6.0%
1951	1,763	−1.3%
1961	1,676	−4.9%
1971	1,690	+0.8%
1981	1,691	+0.1%
1991	1,700	+0.5%
2001	1,699	−0.1%
2012	1,550	−8.8%

|
