= Deutsch Goritz =

- Municipality
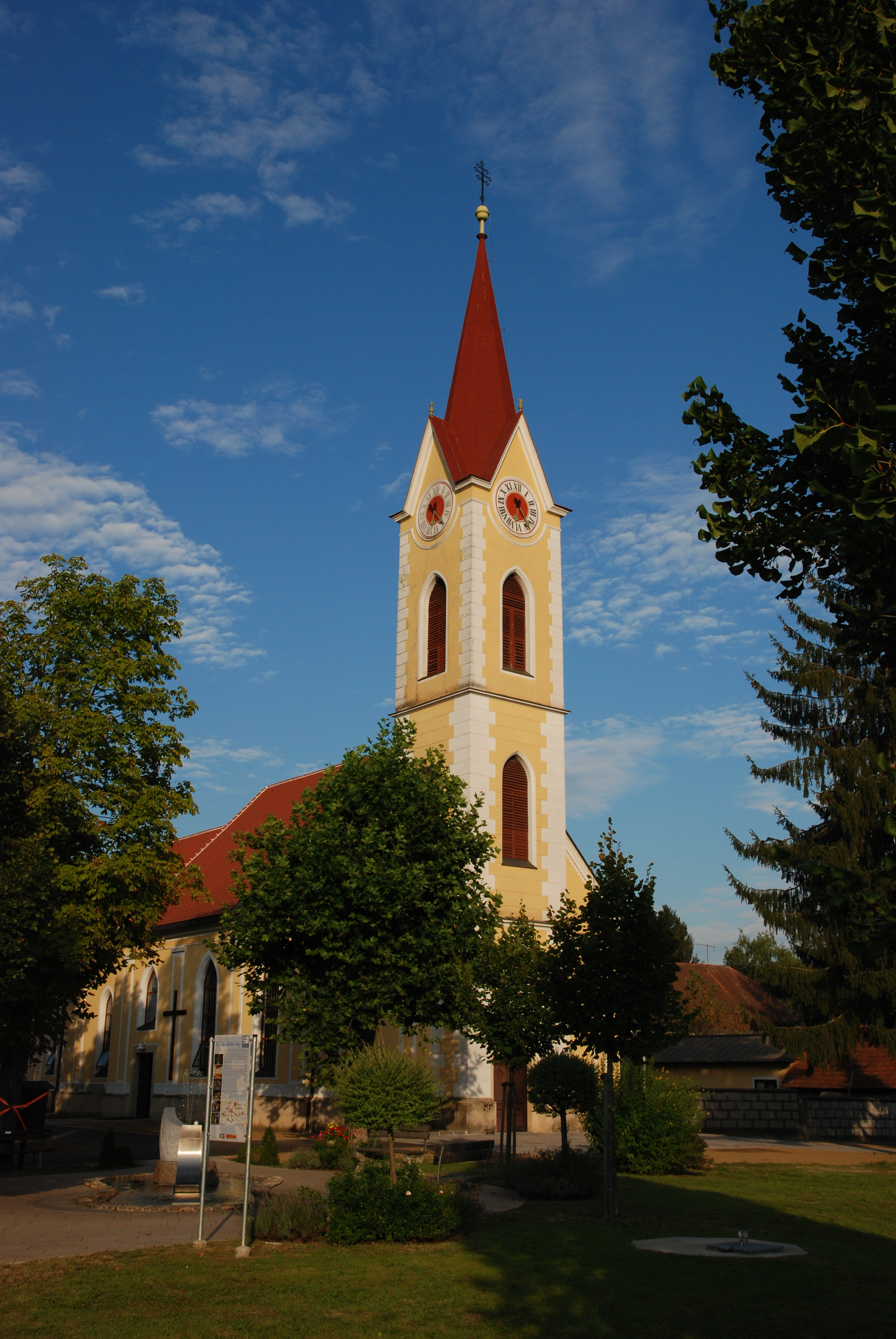
- Deutsch Goritz parish church

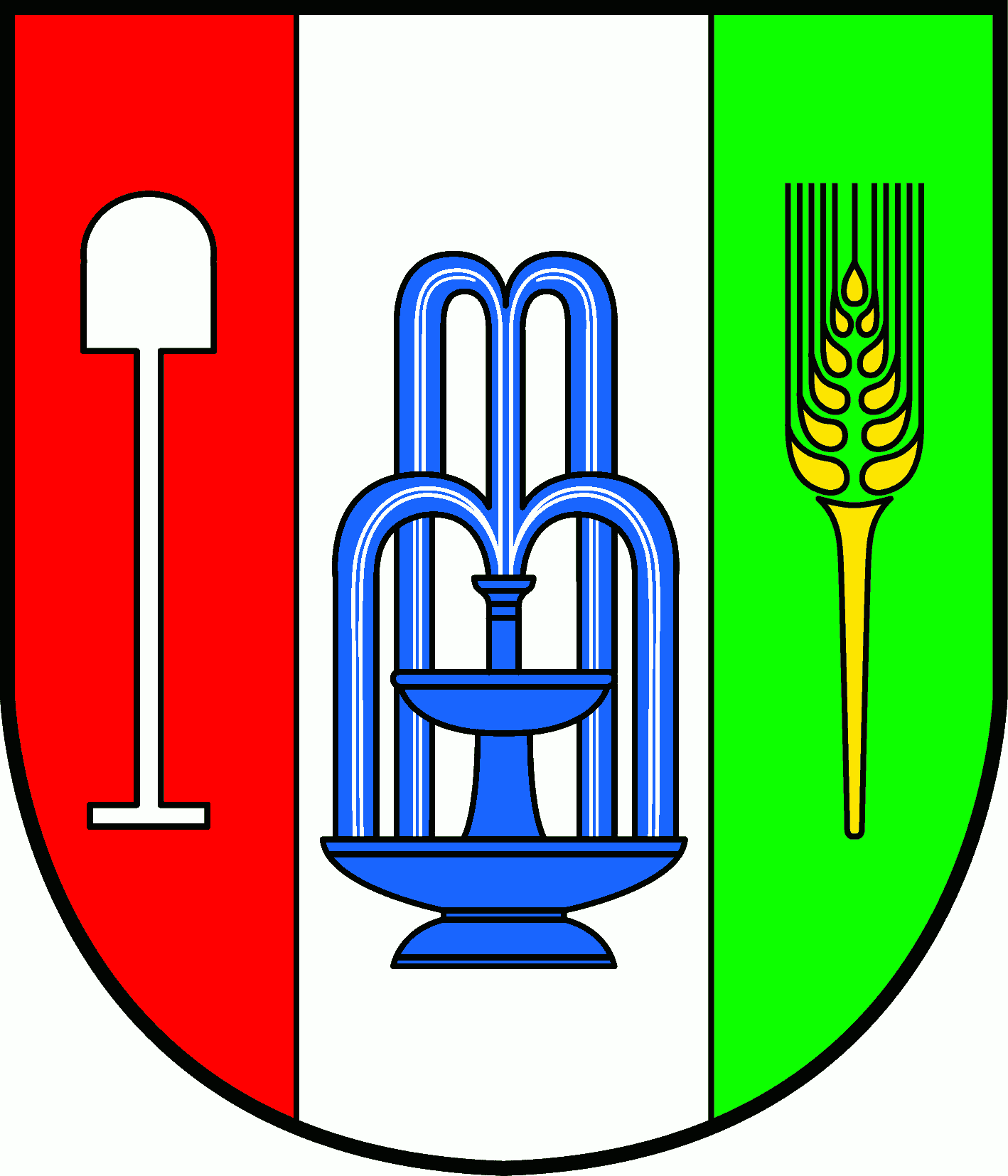
- Coat of arms

- Location within Austria
- Coordinates: 46°45′00″N 15°49′48″E
- Country: Austria
- State: Styria
- District: Südoststeiermark

Government
  - Mayor: Heinrich Tomschitz (ÖVP)

Area
  - Total: 33.71 km^{2} (13.02 sq mi)
- Elevation: 244 m (801 ft)

Population (2018-01-01)
  - Total: 1,816
  - Density: 53.87/km^{2} (139.5/sq mi)
- Time zone: UTC+1 (CET)
  - Summer (DST): UTC+2 (CEST)
- Postal code: 8483
- Area code: 03474
- Vehicle registration: RA
- Website: www.deutsch-goritz.at

Deutsch Goritz is a municipality in the district of Südoststeiermark in the Austrian state of Styria.

== Population ==
Historical population
Year	Pop.	±%
1869	1,634	—
1880	1,733	+6.1%
1890	1,721	−0.7%
1900	1,662	−3.4%
1910	1,756	+5.7%
1923	1,686	−4.0%
1934	1,705	+1.1%
1939	1,617	−5.2%
1951	1,622	+0.3%
1961	1,526	−5.9%
1971	1,492	−2.2%
1981	1,402	−6.0%
1991	1,365	−2.6%
2001	1,340	−1.8%
2012	1,231	−8.1%
