= Sankt Peter am Ottersbach =

- Municipality
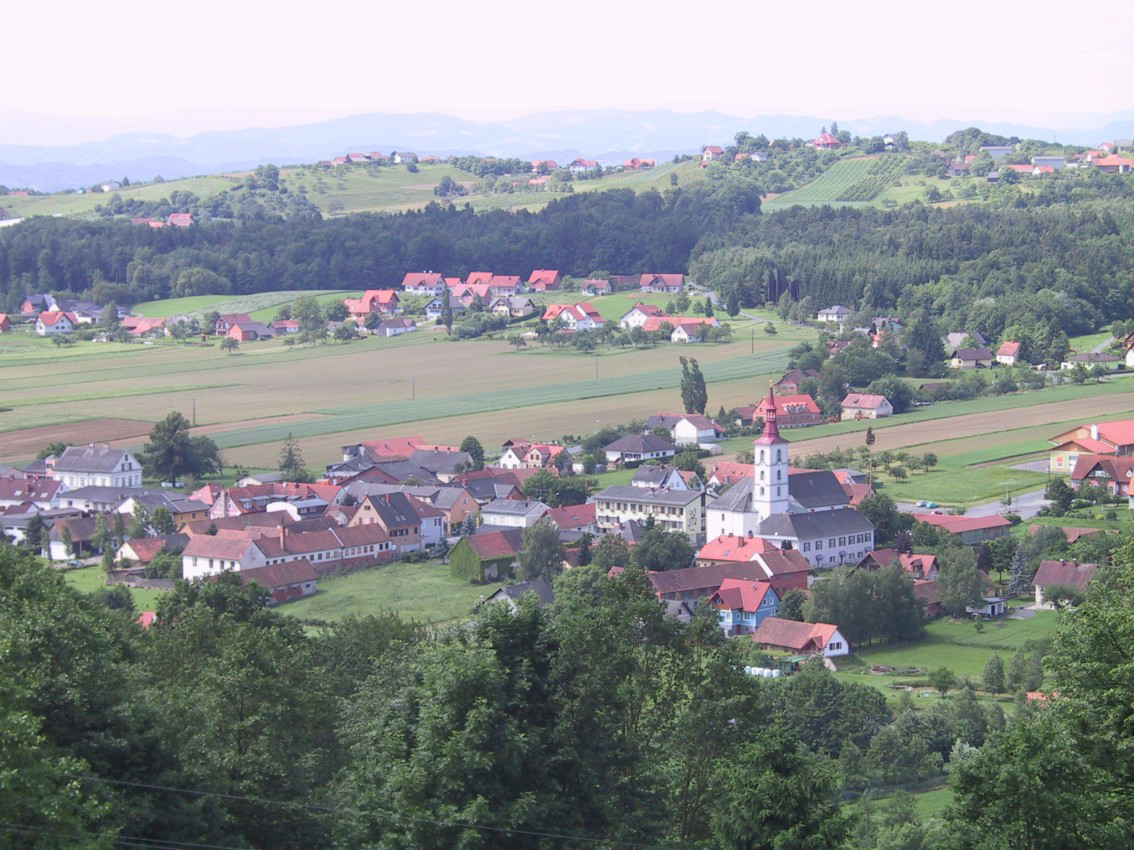

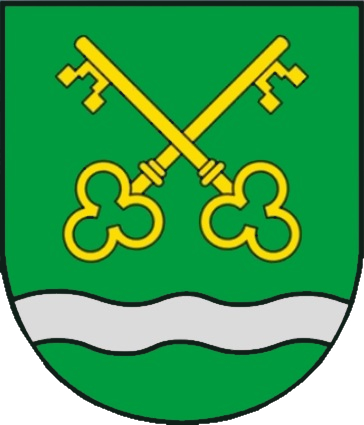
- Coat of arms

- Location within Austria
- Coordinates: 46°47′52″N 15°45′33″E
- Country: Austria
- State: Styria
- District: Südoststeiermark

Government
  - Mayor: Reinhold Ebner (ÖVP)

Area
  - Total: 48.33 km^{2} (18.66 sq mi)
- Elevation: 380 m (1,250 ft)

Population (2018-01-01)
  - Total: 2,950
  - Density: 61.0/km^{2} (158/sq mi)
- Time zone: UTC+1 (CET)
  - Summer (DST): UTC+2 (CEST)
- Postal code: 8093
- Area code: 03477
- Vehicle registration: RA
- Website: www.stpeter-weindorf.at

Sankt Peter am Ottersbach is a municipality in the district of Südoststeiermark in the Austrian state of Styria.

== Population ==
Historical population
Year	Pop.	±%
1869	3,003	—
1880	2,998	−0.2%
1890	2,945	−1.8%
1900	2,843	−3.5%
1910	2,918	+2.6%
1923	2,795	−4.2%
1934	2,811	+0.6%
1939	2,742	−2.5%
1951	2,784	+1.5%
1961	2,567	−7.8%
1971	2,685	+4.6%
1981	2,626	−2.2%
1991	2,477	−5.7%
2001	2,357	−4.8%
2012	2,261	−4.1%
2018	2,950	+30.5%

== Geography ==
Sankt Peter am Ottersbach is located 10 kilometers north of the border with Slovenia and 20 kilometers east of the Pyhrn Autobahn A9, in the southeastern region of Styria, Austria, along the Ottersbach river, which gives the municipality its name.

The landscape of Sankt Peter am Ottersbach is characterized by gentle hills and valleys, steep vineyards, orchards, forests, and fields. The area's small-scale agriculture continues to serve as a livelihood for a portion of the population. Sankt Peter am Ottersbach is particularly known for its wines.

== History ==
Sankt Peter am Ottersbach is a settlement with a history spanning nearly 800 years. Due to its economic and cultural significance, the municipality was elevated to the status of a market town on August 1, 1974.
