= Südoststeiermark District =

Coordinates: 46.9500°N 15.8833°E

Südoststeiermark District Bezirk Südoststeiermark
- District
- Country: Austria
- State: Styria
- Number of municipalities: 25
- Administrative seat: Feldbach
- Established: 2013-01-01

Government
  - District Governor: Elke Schunter-Angerer

Area
  - Total: 983 km^{2} (380 sq mi)
- 2021

Population (1. January 2021)
  - Total: 83,841
  - Density: 85.3/km^{2} (221/sq mi)
- Time zone: UTC+01:00 (CET)
  - Summer (DST): UTC+02:00 (CEST)
- ISO 3166 code: AT-623
- Vehicle registration: SO
- NUTS code: AT224

Bezirk Südoststeiermark (Austrian German: [sydˈɔstˌʃtaɪɐmark]; "South East Styria") is a district of the state of Styria in Austria. It was formed on January 1, 2013 through a merger of the former Radkersburg District and Feldbach District.

== Municipalities ==
Until the end of 2014 Südoststeiermark incorporated 74 municipalities. Since the 1 January Styria municipal structural reform, the district consists of 26 municipalities, Since 2020 the following 25 municipalities:

- Bad Gleichenberg
- Bad Radkersburg
- Deutsch Goritz
- Edelsbach bei Feldbach
- Eichkögl
- Fehring
- Feldbach
- Gnas
- Halbenrain
- Jagerberg
- Kapfenstein
- Kirchbach-Zerlach
- Kirchberg an der Raab
- Klöch
- Mettersdorf am Saßbach
- Mureck
- Paldau
- Pirching am Traubenberg
- Riegersburg
- Sankt Anna am Aigen
- Sankt Peter am Ottersbach
- Sankt Stefan im Rosental
- Straden
- Tieschen
- Unterlamm
