= Kirchschlag =

Kirchschlag may refer to the following places in Austria:

- Kirchschlag in der Buckligen Welt, a town in the district Wiener Neustadt-Land, Lower Austria
- Kirchschlag, Zwettl, a municipality in the district of Zwettl, Lower Austria
- Kirchschlag bei Linz, a municipality in the district Urfahr-Umgebung, Upper Austria
