= Großnondorf =

Großnondorf is the name of the following places:

- a cadastral community in the municipal Guntersdorf, Lower Austria, Austria
- a cadastral community in the municipal Sallingberg, Lower Austria, Austria
