= Großgöttfritz =

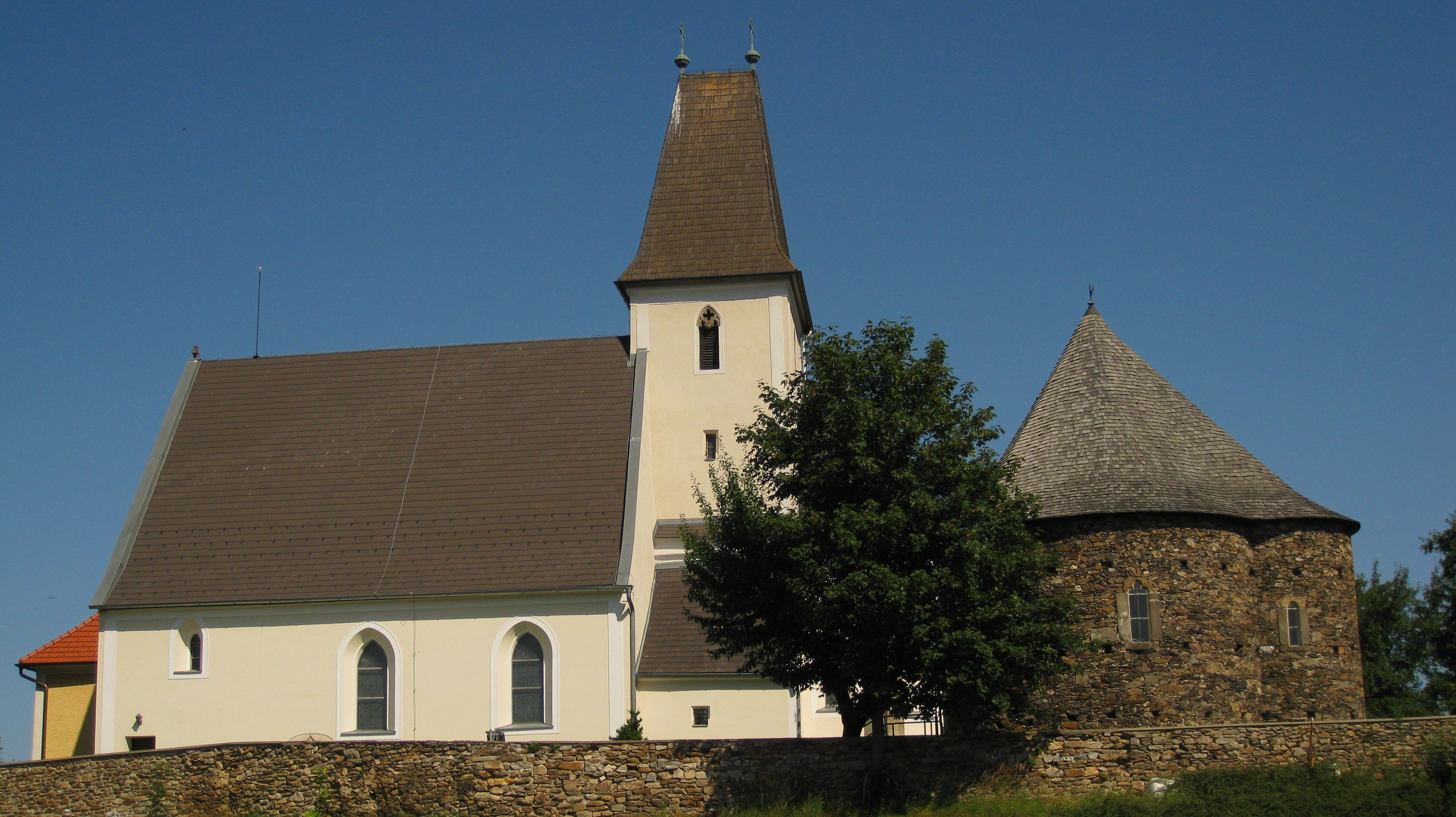
- Großgöttfritz parish church

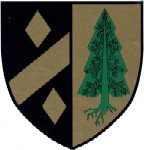
- Coat of arms

- Location within Austria
- Coordinates: 48°32′00″N 15°11′00″E
- Country: Austria
- State: Lower Austria
- District: Zwettl

Government
  - Mayor: Johann Hofbauer (ÖVP)

Area
  - Total: 40.17 km^{2} (15.51 sq mi)
- Elevation: 714 m (2,343 ft)

Population (2018-01-01)
  - Total: 1,371
  - Density: 34.13/km^{2} (88.40/sq mi)
- Time zone: UTC+1 (CET)
  - Summer (DST): UTC+2 (CEST)
- Postal code: 3913
- Area code: 02875
- Vehicle registration: ZT
- Website: www.grossgoettfritz.at

Großgöttfritz is a municipality in the district of Zwettl in the Austrian state of Lower Austria.

== Population ==
Historical population
| Year | Pop. | ±% |
|---|---|---|
| 1971 | 1,496 | — |
| 1981 | 1,410 | −5.7% |
| 1991 | 1,394 | −1.1% |
| 2001 | 1,468 | +5.3% |
