= Kottes-Purk =

- Municipality
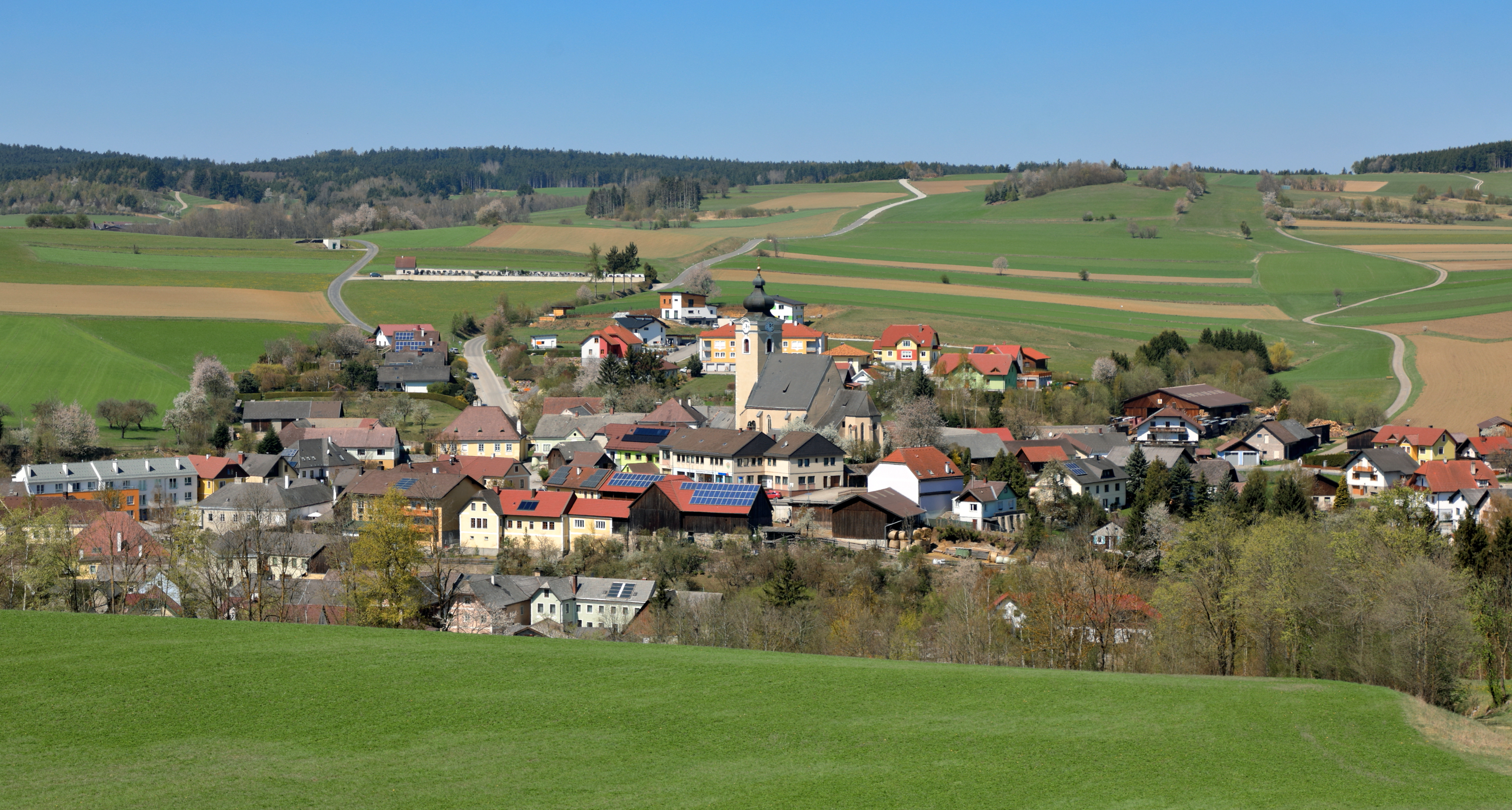

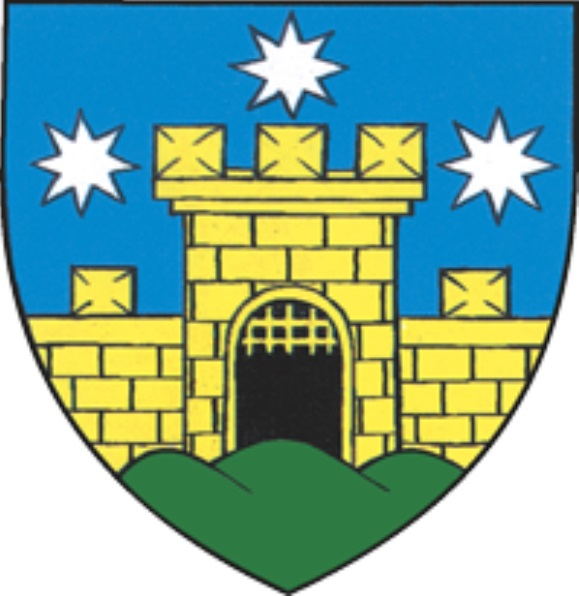
- Coat of arms

- Location within Austria
- Coordinates: 48°25′00″N 15°18′00″E
- Country: Austria
- State: Lower Austria
- District: Zwettl

Government
  - Mayor: Wolfgang Vogl (ÖVP)

Area
  - Total: 58.61 km^{2} (22.63 sq mi)
- Elevation: 706 m (2,316 ft)

Population (2018-01-01)
  - Total: 1,485
  - Density: 25.34/km^{2} (65.62/sq mi)
- Time zone: UTC+1 (CET)
  - Summer (DST): UTC+2 (CEST)
- Postal code: 3623
- Area code: 02873
- Vehicle registration: ZT
- Website: www.kottes-purk.at

Kottes-Purk is a municipality in the district of Zwettl in the Austrian state of Lower Austria.

== Population ==
Historical population
Year	Pop.	±%
1971	1,890	—
1981	1,788	−5.4%
1991	1,672	−6.5%
2001	1,628	−2.6%
