= Grafenschlag =

- Municipality
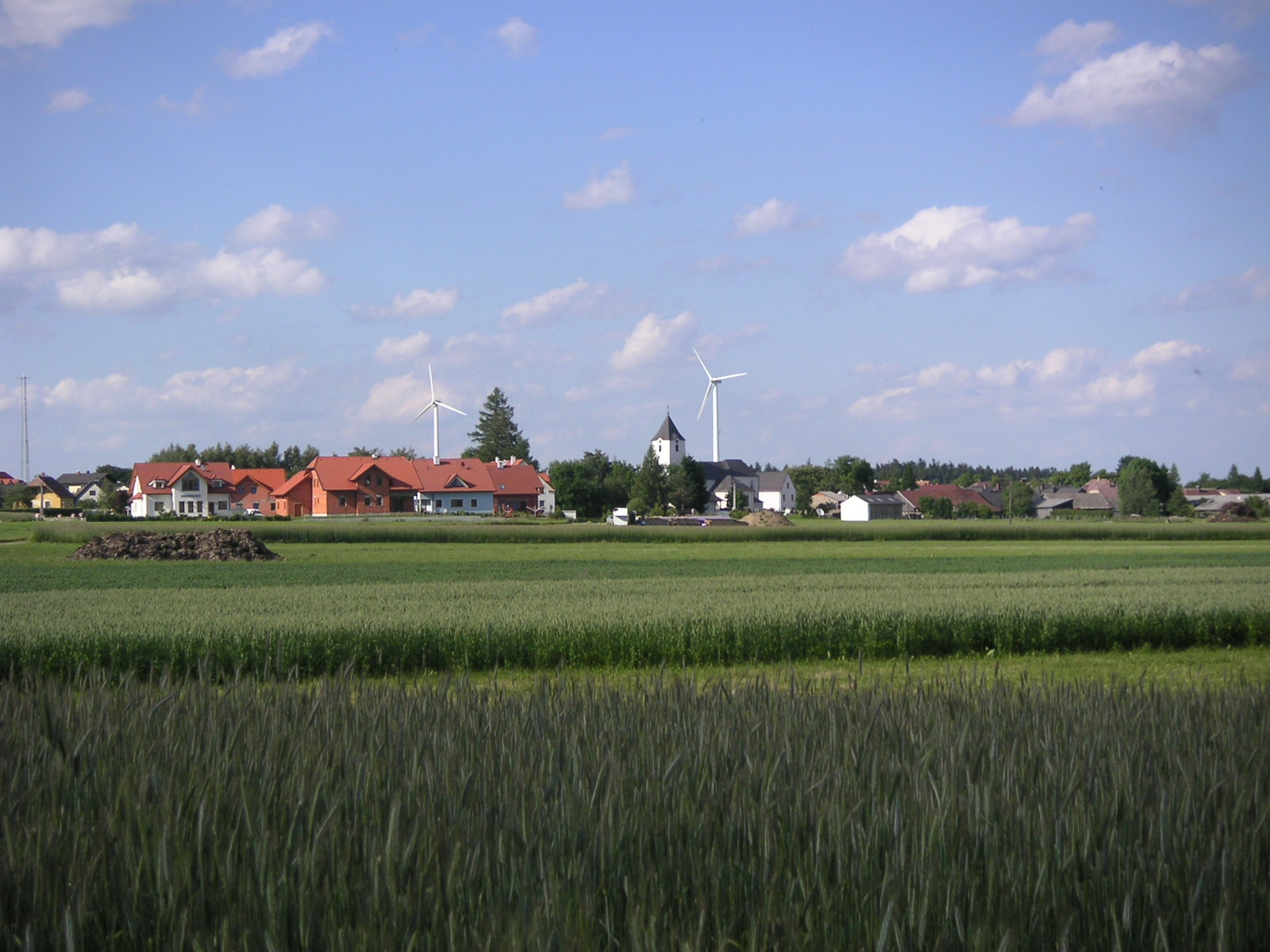
- Southwest view of Grafenschlag

- Coat of arms

- Location within Austria
- Coordinates: 48°30′00″N 15°10′00″E
- Country: Austria
- State: Lower Austria
- District: Zwettl

Government
  - Mayor: Engelbert Heiderer (ÖVP)

Area
  - Total: 34.2 km^{2} (13.2 sq mi)
- Elevation: 780 m (2,560 ft)

Population (2018-01-01)
  - Total: 853
  - Density: 24.9/km^{2} (64.6/sq mi)
- Time zone: UTC+1 (CET)
  - Summer (DST): UTC+2 (CEST)
- Postal code: 3912
- Area code: 02875
- Vehicle registration: ZT
- Website: www.grafenschlag.at

Grafenschlag is a municipality in the district of Zwettl in the Austrian state of Lower Austria.

== Population ==
Historical population
Year	Pop.	±%
1971	1,109	—
1981	1,048	−5.5%
1991	870	−17.0%
2001	893	+2.6%
2011	876	−1.9%
