= Zwettl District =

Coordinates: 48.581°N 15.152°E

Zwettl District Bezirk Zwettl
- District
- Country: Austria
- State: Lower Austria
- Number of municipalities: 24
- Administrative seat: Zwettl

Government
  - District Governor: Markus Peham (since 2022)

Area
  - Total: 1,399.8 km^{2} (540.5 sq mi)

Population (2024)
  - Total: 41,765
  - Density: 29.836/km^{2} (77.276/sq mi)
- Time zone: UTC+01:00 (CET)
  - Summer (DST): UTC+02:00 (CEST)
- Vehicle registration: ZT
- NUTS code: AT124
- NUTS code: 325

Bezirk Zwettl is a district of the state of Lower Austria in Austria.

== Municipalities ==
Suburbs, hamlets and other subdivisions of a municipality are indicated in small characters.

- Allentsteig
  - Allentsteig, Bernschlag, Reinsbach, Thaua, Zwinzen
- Altmelon
  - Altmelon, Dietrichsbach, Dürnberg, Fichtenbach, Großpertenschlag, Kleinpertenschlag, Kronberg, Kronegg, Marchstein, Perwolfs, Schwarzau
- Arbesbach
  - Arbesbach, Brunn, Etlas, Haselbach, Kamp, Neumelon, Pretrobruck, Purrath, Rammelhof, Schönfeld, Schwarzau, Wiesensfeld
- Bärnkopf
- Echsenbach
  - Echsenbach, Gerweis, Großkainraths, Haimschlag, Kleinpoppen, Rieweis, Wolfenstein
- Göpfritz an der Wild
  - Almosen, Breitenfeld, Georgenberg, Göpfritz an der Wild, Kirchberg an der Wild, Merkenbrechts, Scheideldorf, Schönfeld an der Wild, Weinpolz
- Grafenschlag
  - Bromberg, Grafenschlag, Kaltenbrunn, Kleingöttfritz, Kleinnondorf, Langschlag, Schafberg, Wielands
- Groß Gerungs
  - Aigen, Albern, Antenfeinhöfe, Blumau, Böhmsdorf, Dietmanns, Egres, Etlas, Etzen, Frauendorf, Freitzenschlag, Griesbach, Groß Gerungs, Groß Meinharts, Haid, Harruck, Häuslern, Heinreichs, Hypolz, Josefsdorf, Kinzenschlag, Klein Gundholz, Klein Reinprechts, Klein Wetzles, Kotting Nondorf, Marharts, Mühlbach, Nonndorf, Ober Neustift, Ober Rosenauerwald, Oberkirchen, Preinreichs, Reitern, Schall, Schönbichl, Siebenberg, Sitzmanns, Thail, Wendelgraben, Wurmbrand
- Großgöttfritz
  - Engelbrechts, Frankenreith, Großgöttfritz, Großweißenbach, Kleinweißenbach, Reichers, Rohrenreith, Sprögnitz
- Gutenbrunn
  - Gutenbrunn, Ulrichschlag
- Kirchschlag
  - Bernhardshof, Eck, Gaßles, Kienings, Kirchschlag, Merkengerst, Pleßberg, Roggenreith, Scheib, Schneeberg
- Kottes-Purk
  - Bernhards, Dankholz, Doppl, Elsenreith, Ensberg, Ernst, Felles, Fohra, Gotthardschlag, Gschwendt, Günsles, Heitzles, Hörans, Kalkgrub, Koppenhof, Kottes, Leopolds, Münichreith, Pfaffenschlag, Pötzles, Purk, Reichpolds, Richterhof, Runds, Schoberhof, Singenreith, Teichmanns, Trittings, Voirans, Voitsau, Weikartschlag, Wernhies
- Langschlag
  - Bruderndorf, Bruderndorferwald, Fraberg, Kainrathschlag, Kasbach, Kehrbach, Kleinpertholz, Kogschlag, Langschlag, Langschlägerwald, Mittelberg, Mitterschlag, Münzbach, Reichenauerwald, Schmerbach, Siebenhöf, Stierberg, Streith
- Martinsberg
  - Edlesberg, Kleingerungs, Kleinpertholz, Loitzenreith, Martinsberg, Mitterndorf, Oed, Pitzeichen, Poggschlag, Reitzendorf, Thumling, Walpersdorf, Weixelberg, Wiehalm
- Ottenschlag
  - Bernreith, Endlas, Jungschlag, Neuhof, Oedwinkel, Ottenschlag, Reith
- Pölla
  - Altpölla, Döllersheim, Franzen, Kienberg, Kleinenzersdorf, Kleinraabs, Krug, Neupölla, Nondorf, Ramsau, Reichhalms, Schmerbach am Kamp, Waldreichs, Wegscheid am Kamp, Wetzlas
- Rappottenstein
  - Aggsbach, Arnreith, Dietharts, Grossgundholz, Grötschen, Grünbach, Hausbach, Höhendorf, Kirchbach, Kleinnondorf, Lembach, Neustift, Oberrabenthan, Pehendorf, Pfaffendorf, Pirkenreith, Rappottenstein, Reichenbach, Riebeis, Ritterkamp, Roiten, Selbitz
- Sallingberg
  - Armschlag, Grainbrunn, Großnondorf, Heubach, Kamles, Kleinhaslau, Lugendorf, Moniholz, Rabenhof, Sallingberg, Spielleithen, Spielleithen, Voitschlag
- Schönbach
  - Aschen, Dorfstadt, Fichtenhöfen, Grub im Thale, Klein-Siegharts, Lengau, Lichtenau, Lohn, Pernthon, Schönbach
- Schwarzenau
  - Ganz, Großhaselbach, Hausbach, Limpfings, Modlisch, Schlag, Schwarzenau, Stögersbach
- Schweiggers
  - Großreichenbach, Kleinwolfgers, Limbach, Mannshalm, Meinhartschlag, Perndorf, Reinbolden, Sallingstadt, Schwarzenbach, Schweiggers, Siebenlinden, Streitbach, Unterwindhag, Vierlings, Walterschlag, Windhof
- Traunstein
  - Biberschlag, Dietmanns, Gürtelberg, Haselberg, Hummelberg, Kaltenbach, Pfaffings, Prettles, Schönau, Spielberg, Stein, Traunstein, Walterschlag, Weidenegg
- Waldhausen
  - Brand, Gutenbrunn, Hirschenschlag, Königsbach, Loschberg, Niedernondorf, Niederwaltenreith, Obernondorf, Rappoltschlag, Waldhausen, Werschenschlag, Wiesenreith
- Zwettl
  - Annatsberg, Bernhards, Böhmhöf, Bösenneunzen, Edelhof, Eschabruck, Friedersbach, Gerlas, Germanns, Gerotten, Gradnitz, Großglobnitz, Großhaslau, Gschwendt, Guttenbrunn, Hörmanns, Hörweix, Jagenbach, Jahrings, Kleehof, Kleinmeinharts, Kleinotten, Kleinschönau, Koblhof, Marbach am Walde, Mayerhöfen, Merzenstein, Mitterreith, Moidrams, Negers, Neusiedl, Niederglobnitz, Niederneustift, Niederneustift, Niederstrahlbach, Oberstrahlbach, Oberwaltenreith, Ottenschlag, Purken, Ratschenhof, Rieggers, Ritzmannshof, Rosenau Dorf, Rosenau Schloss, Rottenbach, Rudmanns, Schickenhof, Syrafeld, Unterrabenthan, Unterrosenauerwald, Uttissenbach, Waldhams, Wolfsberg, Zwettl Stift, Zwettl
