= Bärnkopf =

- Municipality
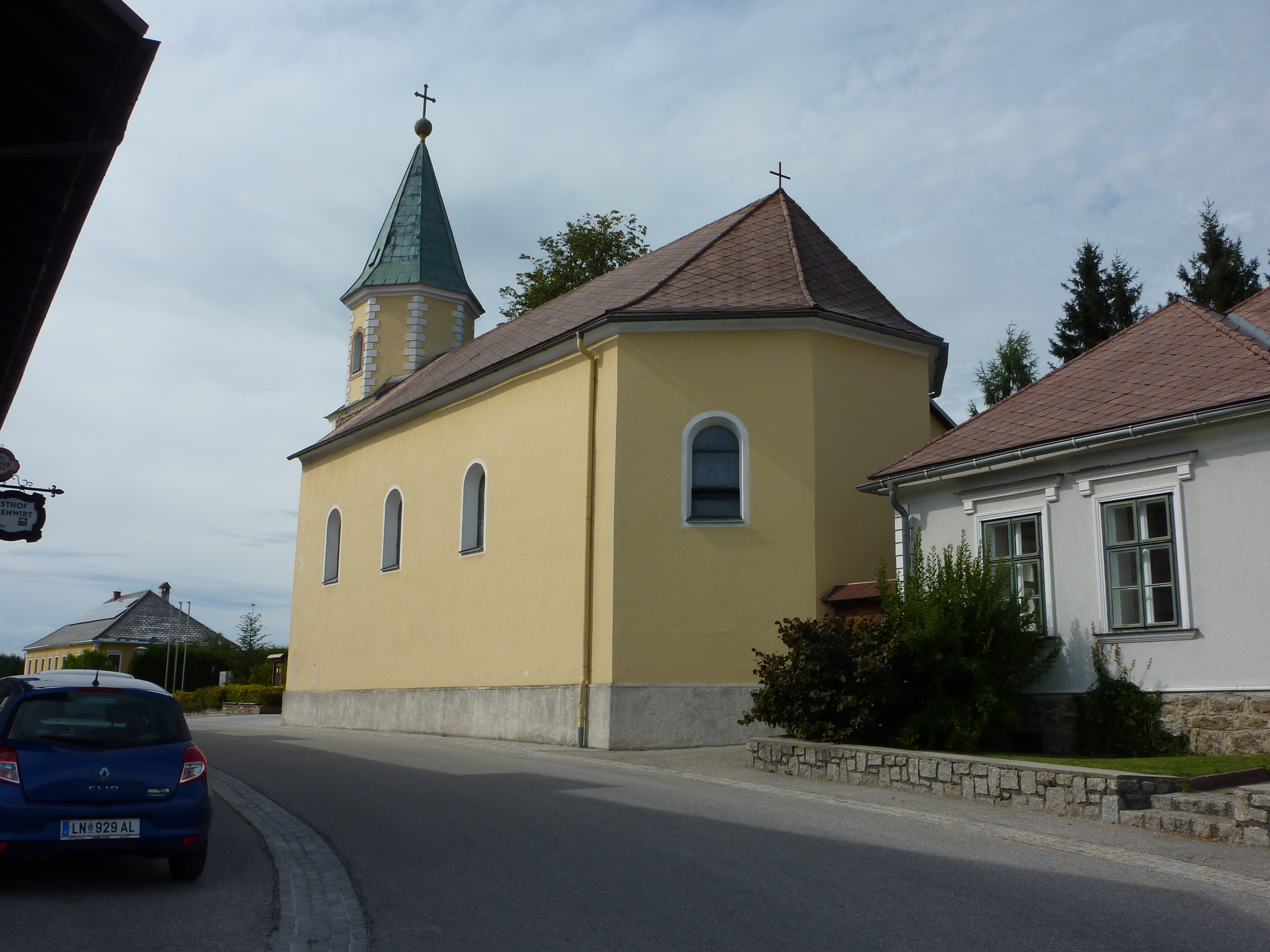
- Bärnkopf parish church

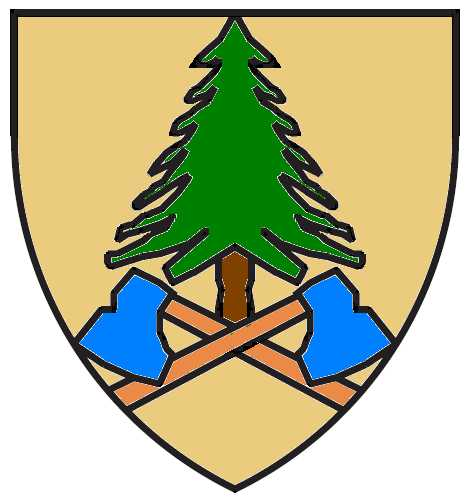
- Coat of arms

- Location within Austria
- Coordinates: 48°23′27″N 15°00′21″E
- Country: Austria
- State: Lower Austria
- District: Zwettl

Government
  - Mayor: Ernst Hauschild (SPÖ)

Area
  - Total: 47.62 km^{2} (18.39 sq mi)
- Elevation: 968 m (3,176 ft)

Population (2018-01-01)
  - Total: 355
  - Density: 7.45/km^{2} (19.3/sq mi)
- Time zone: UTC+1 (CET)
  - Summer (DST): UTC+2 (CEST)
- Postal code: 3665
- Area code: 02874
- Vehicle registration: ZT
- Website: www.baernkopf.at

Bärnkopf is a municipality in the district of Zwettl in the Austrian state of Lower Austria.

== Population ==
Historical population
| Year | Pop. | ±% |
|---|---|---|
| 1971 | 465 | — |
| 1981 | 414 | −11.0% |
| 1991 | 384 | −7.2% |
| 2001 | 378 | −1.6% |
