= Schönbach, Austria =

Schönbach
- Municipality
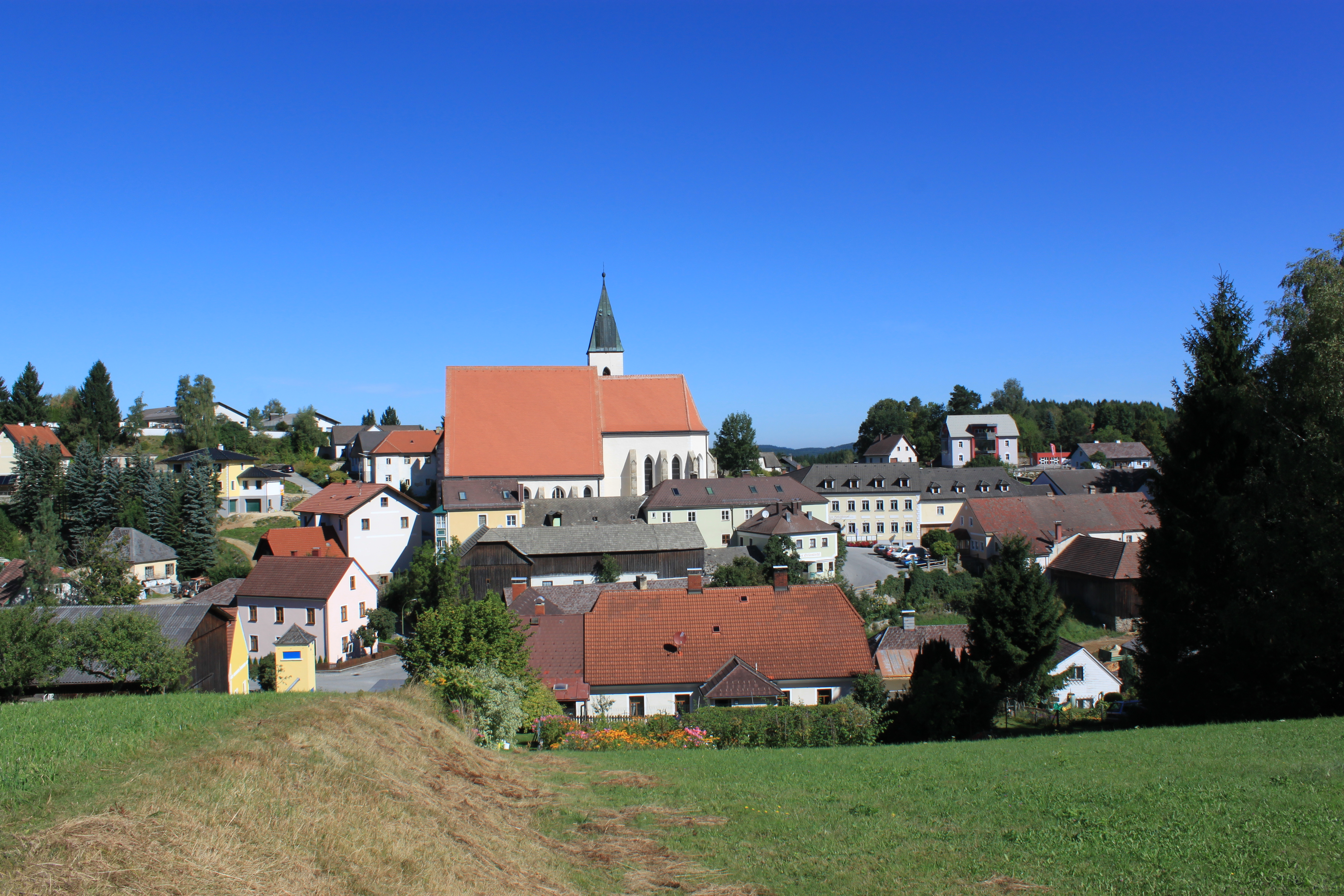
- Schönbach

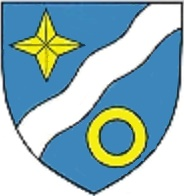
- Coat of arms

- Location within Austria
- Coordinates: 48°27′00″N 15°02′00″E
- Country: Austria
- State: Lower Austria
- District: Zwettl

Government
  - Mayor: Ewald Fröschl (ÖVP)

Area
  - Total: 34.65 km^{2} (13.38 sq mi)
- Elevation: 731 m (2,398 ft)

Population (2018-01-01)
  - Total: 798
  - Density: 23.0/km^{2} (59.6/sq mi)
- Time zone: UTC+1 (CET)
  - Summer (DST): UTC+2 (CEST)
- Postal code: 3633
- Area code: 02827
- Vehicle registration: ZT
- Website: www.schoenbach.at

Schönbach is a town in the district of Zwettl in the Austrian state of Lower Austria.

== Population ==
Historical population
Year	Pop.	±%
1971	1,069	—
1981	1,031	−3.6%
1991	1,036	+0.5%
2001	939	−9.4%
