= Göpfritz an der Wild =

- Municipality
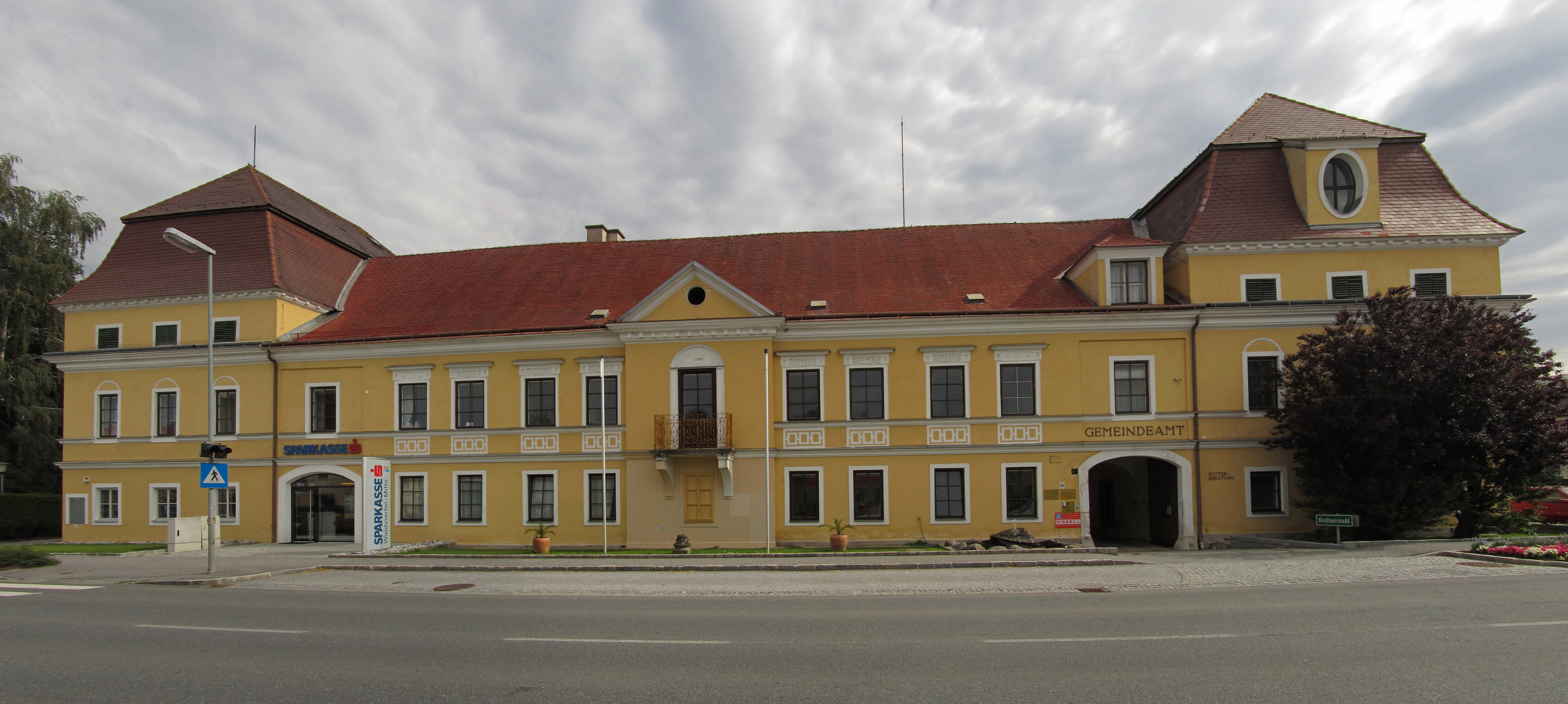
- Göpfritz Castle

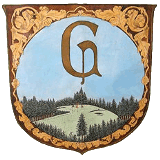
- Coat of arms

- Location within Austria
- Coordinates: 48°43′00″N 15°24′00″E
- Country: Austria
- State: Lower Austria
- District: Zwettl

Government
  - Mayor: Erich Mautner (SPÖ)

Area
  - Total: 60.64 km^{2} (23.41 sq mi)
- Elevation: 580 m (1,900 ft)

Population (2018-01-01)
  - Total: 1,826
  - Density: 30.11/km^{2} (77.99/sq mi)
- Time zone: UTC+1 (CET)
  - Summer (DST): UTC+2 (CEST)
- Postal code: 3800
- Area code: 02825
- Vehicle registration: ZT
- Website: www.goepfritz-wild.gv.at

Göpfritz an der Wild is a municipality in the district of Zwettl in the Austrian state of Lower Austria.

== Population ==
Historical population
Year	Pop.	±%
1971	2,233	—
1981	1,986	−11.1%
1991	1,881	−5.3%
2001	1,809	−3.8%
