= Gutenbrunn =

- Municipality
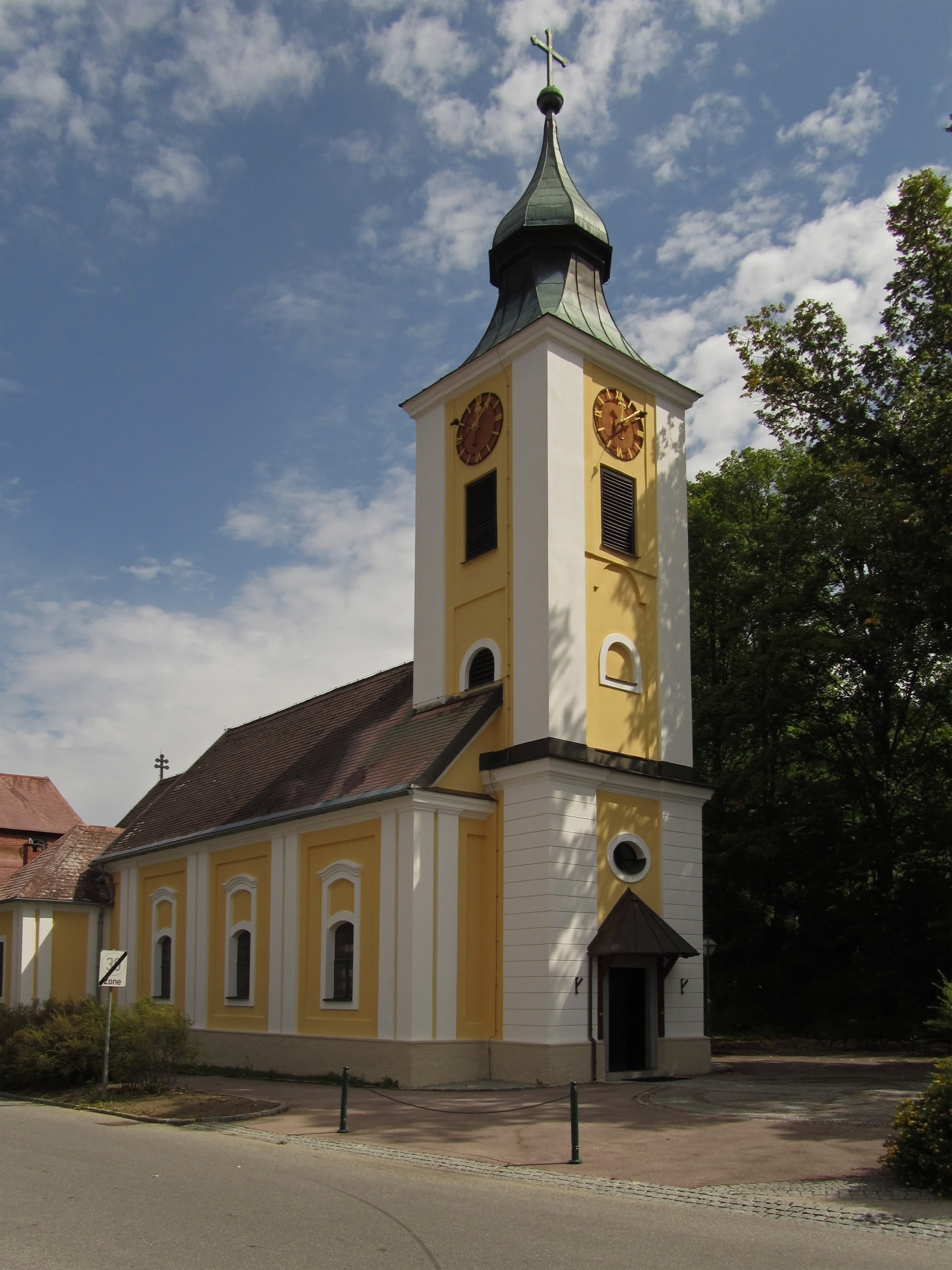
- Gutenbrunn parish church

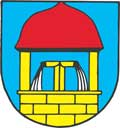
- Coat of arms

- Location within Austria
- Coordinates: 48°21′00″N 15°07′00″E
- Country: Austria
- State: Lower Austria
- District: Zwettl

Government
  - Mayor: Adelheid Ebner (SPÖ)

Area
  - Total: 27.4 km^{2} (10.6 sq mi)
- Elevation: 858 m (2,815 ft)

Population (2018-01-01)
  - Total: 536
  - Density: 19.6/km^{2} (50.7/sq mi)
- Time zone: UTC+1 (CET)
  - Summer (DST): UTC+2 (CEST)
- Postal code: 3665
- Area code: 02874
- Vehicle registration: ZT
- Website: www.gutenbrunn.at

Gutenbrunn is a municipality in the district of Zwettl in the Austrian state of Lower Austria.

== Population ==
Historical population
Year	Pop.	±%
1971	772	—
1981	684	−11.4%
1991	626	−8.5%
2001	600	−4.2%
