= Allentsteig =

- Municipality
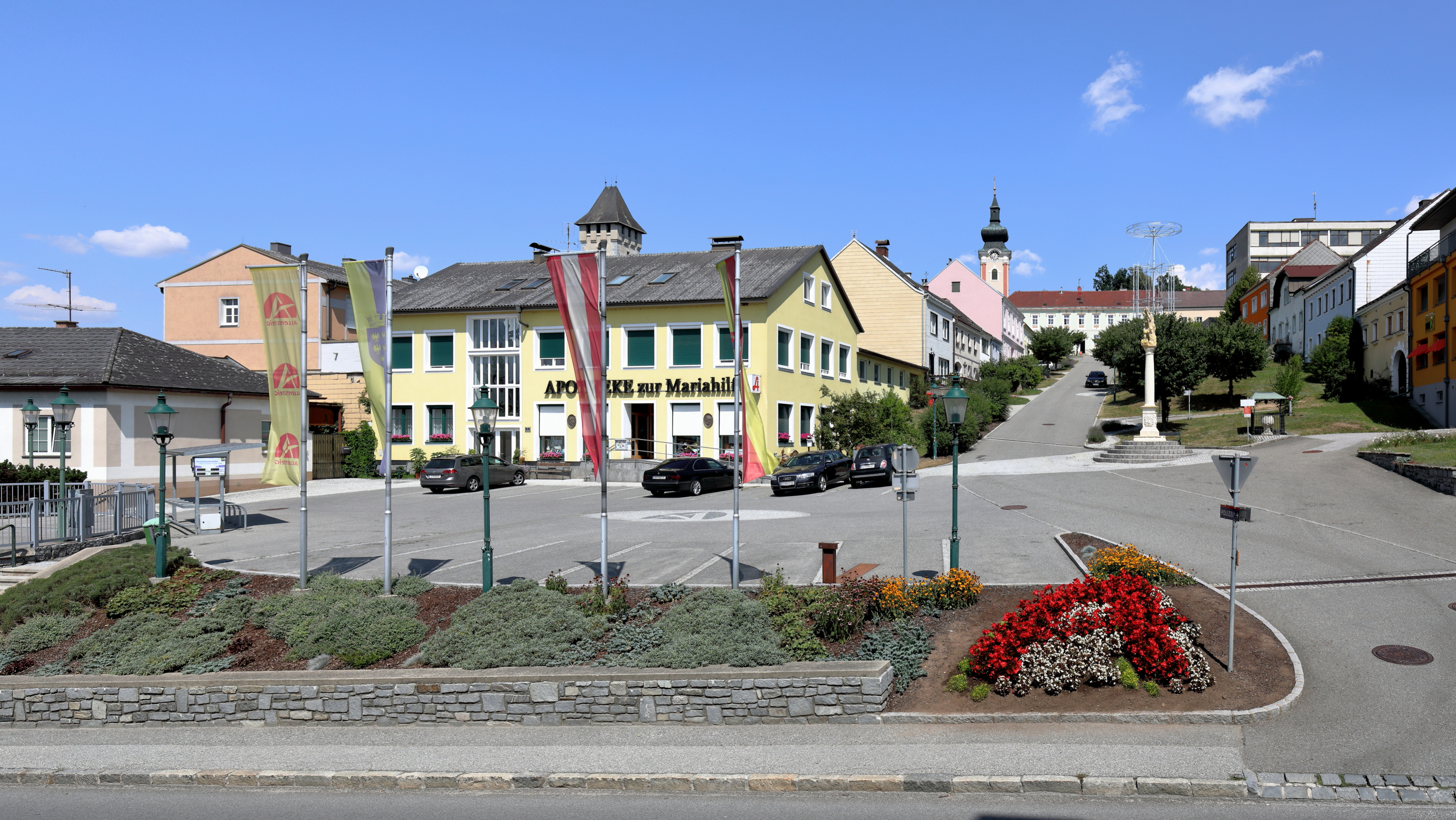

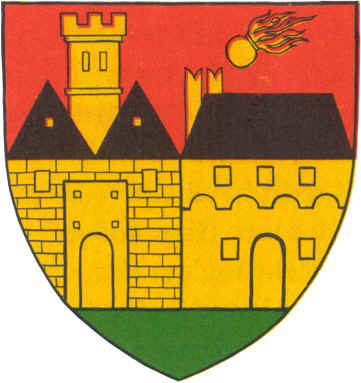
- Coat of arms

- Location within Austria
- Coordinates: 48°41′46.54″N 15°19′38.64″E
- Country: Austria
- State: Lower Austria
- District: Zwettl

Government
  - Mayor: Andreas Kramer (ÖVP)

Area
  - Total: 71.65 km^{2} (27.66 sq mi)
- Elevation: 550 m (1,800 ft)

Population (2018-01-01)
  - Total: 1,835
  - Density: 25.61/km^{2} (66.33/sq mi)
- Time zone: UTC+1 (CET)
  - Summer (DST): UTC+2 (CEST)
- Postal code: 3804
- Area code: 02824
- Vehicle registration: ZT
- Website: www.allentsteig.gv.at

Allentsteig is a municipality in the district of Zwettl, in Lower Austria, Austria.

Just outside Allentsteig there is a German World War II cemetery with almost 3,900 graves. Mainly German soldiers who were killed in the final battles of World War II - trying to prevent the Russian advances into Austria and Germany. The cemetery is located just outside an Austrian military training facility.

== Population ==
Historical population
Year	Pop.	±%
1869	3,549	—
1880	3,618	+1.9%
1890	3,704	+2.4%
1900	4,034	+8.9%
1910	4,301	+6.6%
1923	3,907	−9.2%
1934	3,967	+1.5%
1939	3,604	−9.2%
1951	3,101	−14.0%
1961	2,765	−10.8%
1971	2,790	+0.9%
1981	2,842	+1.9%
1991	2,447	−13.9%
2001	2,163	−11.6%
2011	2,043	−5.5%
