= Ottenschlag =

- Municipality
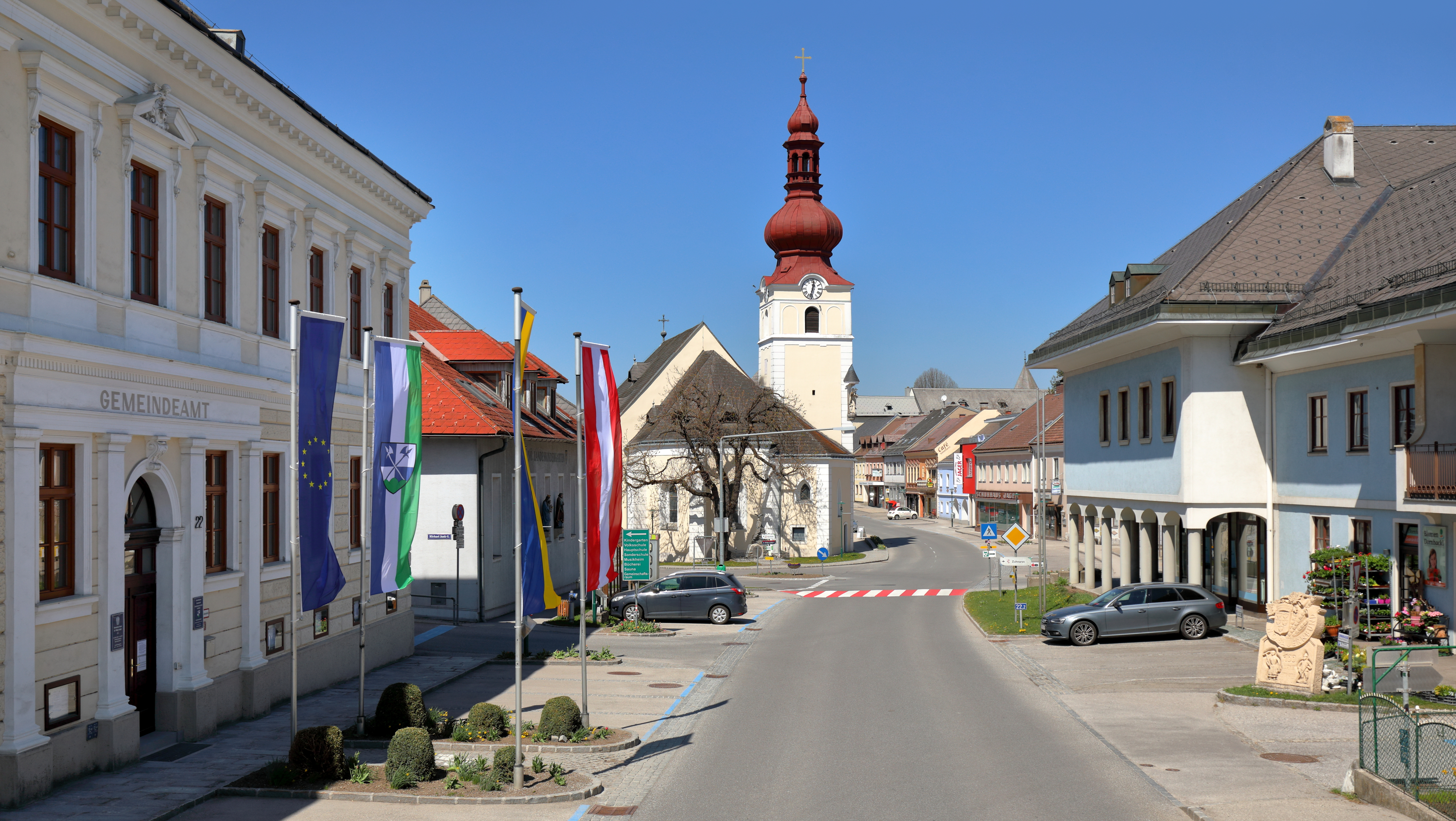
- Center of Ottenschlag

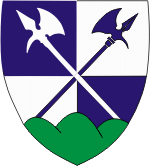
- Coat of arms

- Location within Austria
- Coordinates: 48°25′00″N 15°13′00″E
- Country: Austria
- State: Lower Austria
- District: Zwettl

Government
  - Mayor: Christa Jager (since 2010) (ÖVP)

Area
  - Total: 26.18 km^{2} (10.11 sq mi)
- Elevation: 849 m (2,785 ft)

Population (2018-01-01)
  - Total: 1,002
  - Density: 38.27/km^{2} (99.13/sq mi)
- Time zone: UTC+1 (CET)
  - Summer (DST): UTC+2 (CEST)
- Postal code: 3631
- Area code: 02872
- Vehicle registration: ZT
- Website: www.ottenschlag.com

Ottenschlag is a municipality in the district of Zwettl in the Austrian state of Lower Austria. It is home to Schloss Ottenschlag, a water castle dating from the early 16th century.

== Population ==
Historical population
Year	Pop.	±%
1971	1,220	—
1981	1,202	−1.5%
1991	1,130	−6.0%
2001	1,102	−2.5%

== See also ==
- Flugplatz Ottenschlag
