= Waldhausen =

- Municipality
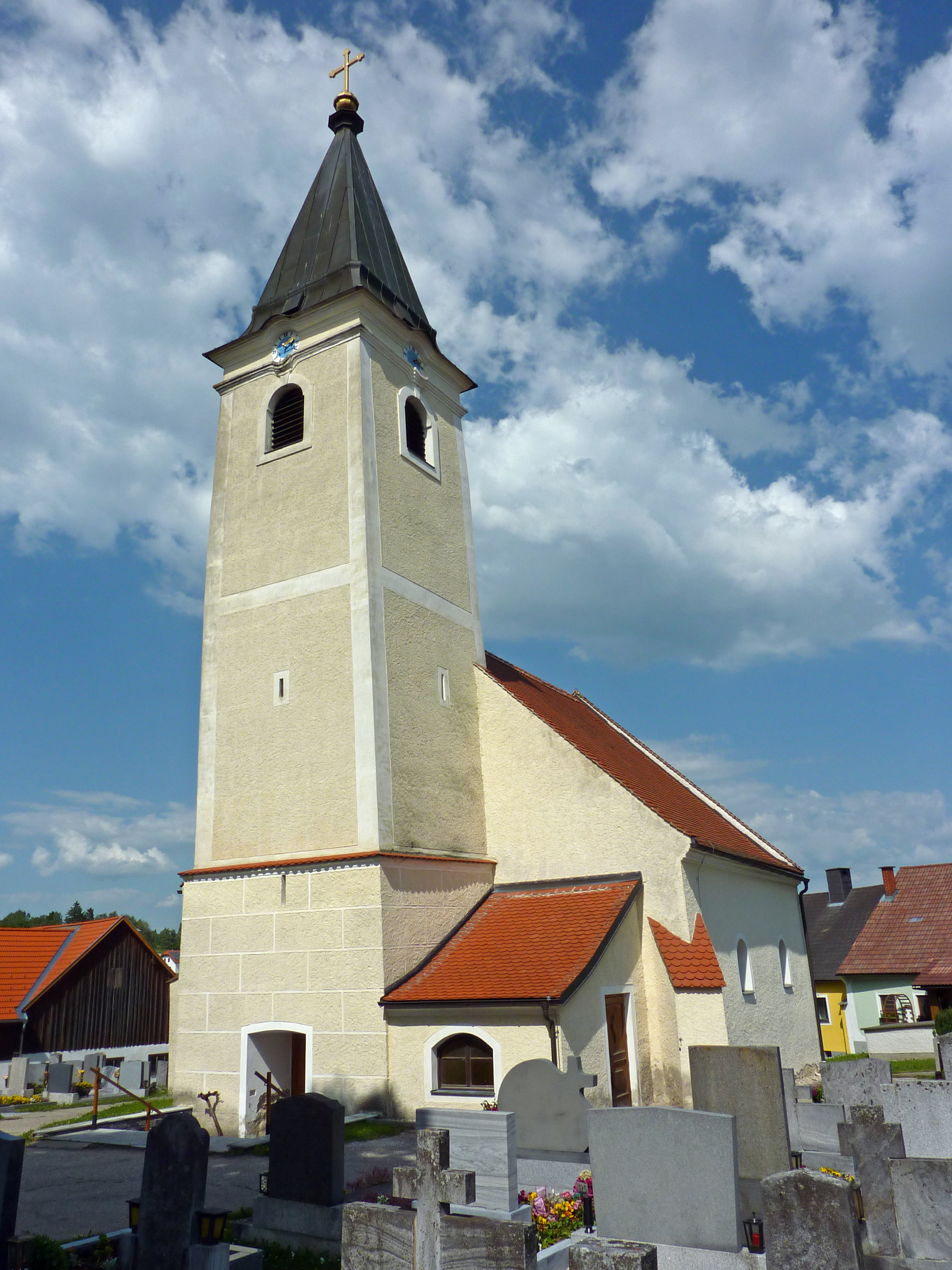
- Waldhausen parish church

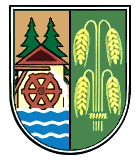
- Coat of arms

- Location within Austria
- Coordinates: 48°31′00″N 15°15′00″E
- Country: Austria
- State: Lower Austria
- District: Zwettl

Government
  - Mayor: Franz Häusler (ÖVP)

Area
  - Total: 39.92 km^{2} (15.41 sq mi)
- Elevation: 682 m (2,238 ft)

Population (2018-01-01)
  - Total: 1,215
  - Density: 30.44/km^{2} (78.83/sq mi)
- Time zone: UTC+1 (CET)
  - Summer (DST): UTC+2 (CEST)
- Postal code: 3914
- Area code: 02877
- Vehicle registration: ZT
- Website: www.tiscover.at

Waldhausen is a municipality in the district of Zwettl in the Austrian state of Lower Austria.

== Geography ==
Waldhausen lies in the Waldviertel in Lower Austria. About 42.86 percent of the municipality is forested.
