= Pölla =

- Municipality
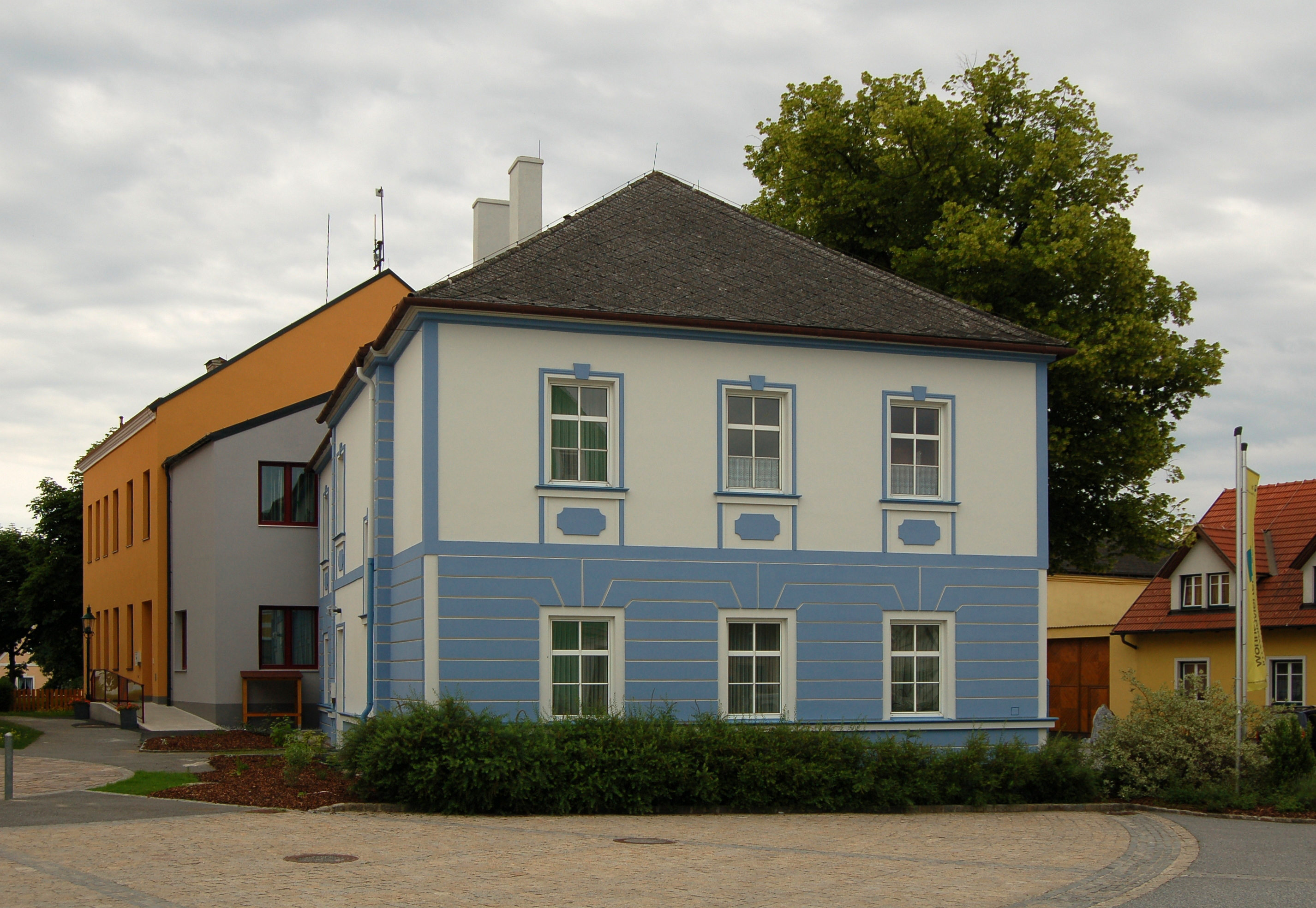
- Town hall at Neupölla

- Coat of arms

- Location within Austria
- Coordinates: 48°38′00″N 15°27′00″E
- Country: Austria
- State: Lower Austria
- District: Zwettl

Government
  - Mayor: Johann Müllner (ÖVP)

Area
  - Total: 104.35 km^{2} (40.29 sq mi)
- Elevation: 475 m (1,558 ft)

Population (2018-01-01)
  - Total: 939
  - Density: 9.00/km^{2} (23.3/sq mi)
- Time zone: UTC+1 (CET)
  - Summer (DST): UTC+2 (CEST)
- Postal code: 3593
- Area code: 02988
- Vehicle registration: ZT
- Website: www.poella.gv.at

Pölla is a municipality in the district of Zwettl in the Austrian state of Lower Austria.

== Geography ==
It is situated roughly in the center of the northwestern region of the Austrian region called Waldviertel. About 46 per cent of the municipality is forested.

== Subdivision ==
The municipality of Pölla consists of:

- Altpölla
- Döllersheim
- Felsenberg
- Franzen
- Kienberg
- Kleinenzersdorf
- Kleinraabs
- Krug
- Neupölla (municipal seat)
- Nondorf
- Ramsau
- Reichhalms
- Riegers
- Schmerbach am Kamp
- Thaures
- Waldreichs
- Wegscheid am Kamp
- Wetzlas

== Population ==
Historical population
Year	Pop.	±%
1971	1,305	—
1981	1,211	−7.2%
1991	1,091	−9.9%
2001	1,056	−3.2%
