= Martinsberg =

- Municipality
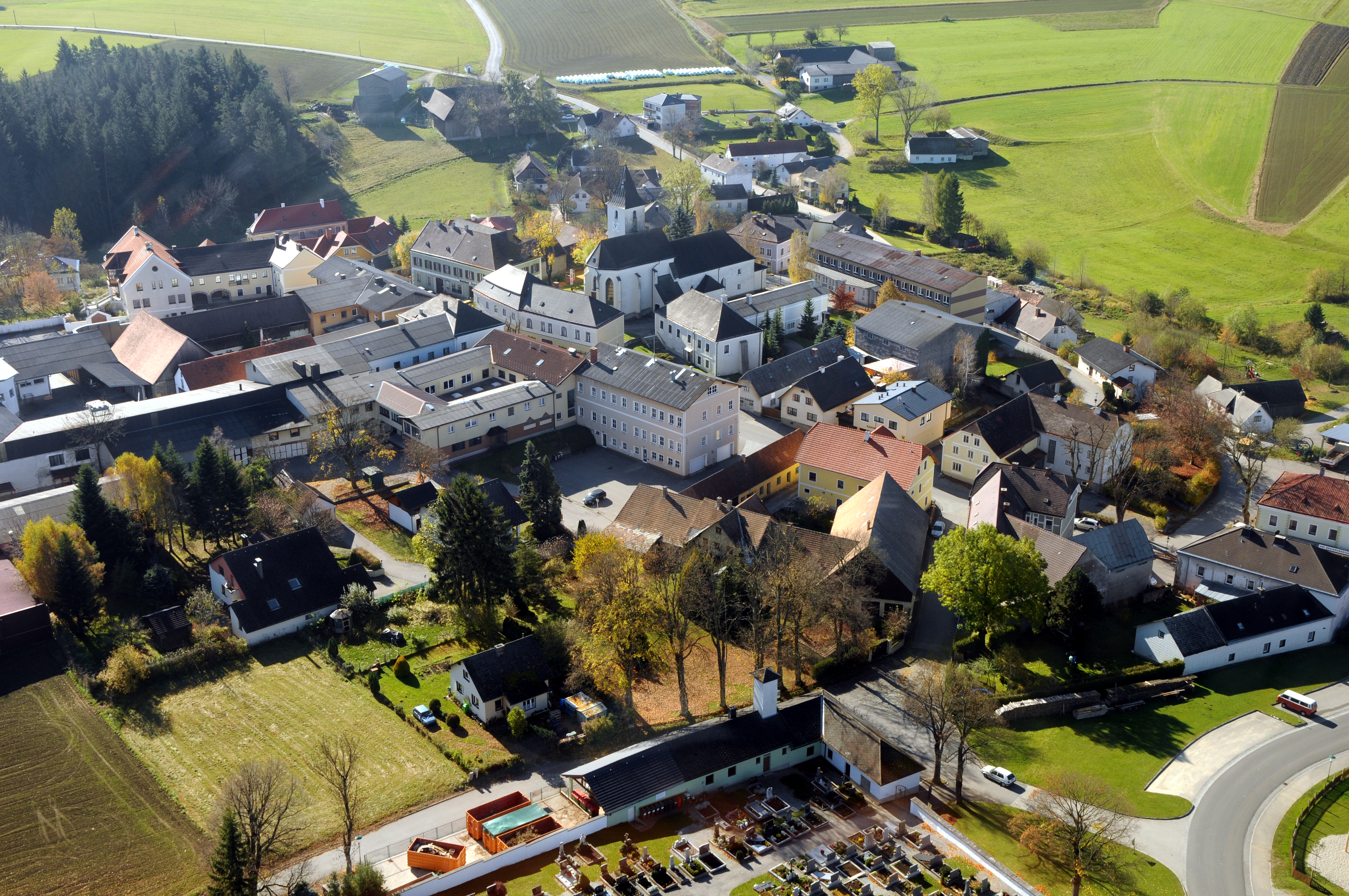

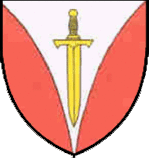
- Coat of arms

- Location within Austria
- Coordinates: 48°22′00″N 15°09′00″E
- Country: Austria
- State: Lower Austria
- District: Zwettl

Government
  - Mayor: Friedrich Fürst (ÖVP)

Area
  - Total: 33.77 km^{2} (13.04 sq mi)
- Elevation: 825 m (2,707 ft)

Population (2018-01-01)
  - Total: 1,096
  - Density: 32.45/km^{2} (84.06/sq mi)
- Time zone: UTC+1 (CET)
  - Summer (DST): UTC+2 (CEST)
- Postal code: 3664
- Area code: 02874
- Vehicle registration: ZT
- Website: www.martinsberg.at

Martinsberg is a market town in the District Zwettl in the Austrian state of Lower Austria.

== Geography ==
About 43.1 percent of the municipality is forested.

== Population ==
Historical population
Year	Pop.	±%
1971	1,419	—
1981	1,317	−7.2%
1991	1,242	−5.7%
2001	1,221	−1.7%
