= Altmelon =

- Municipality
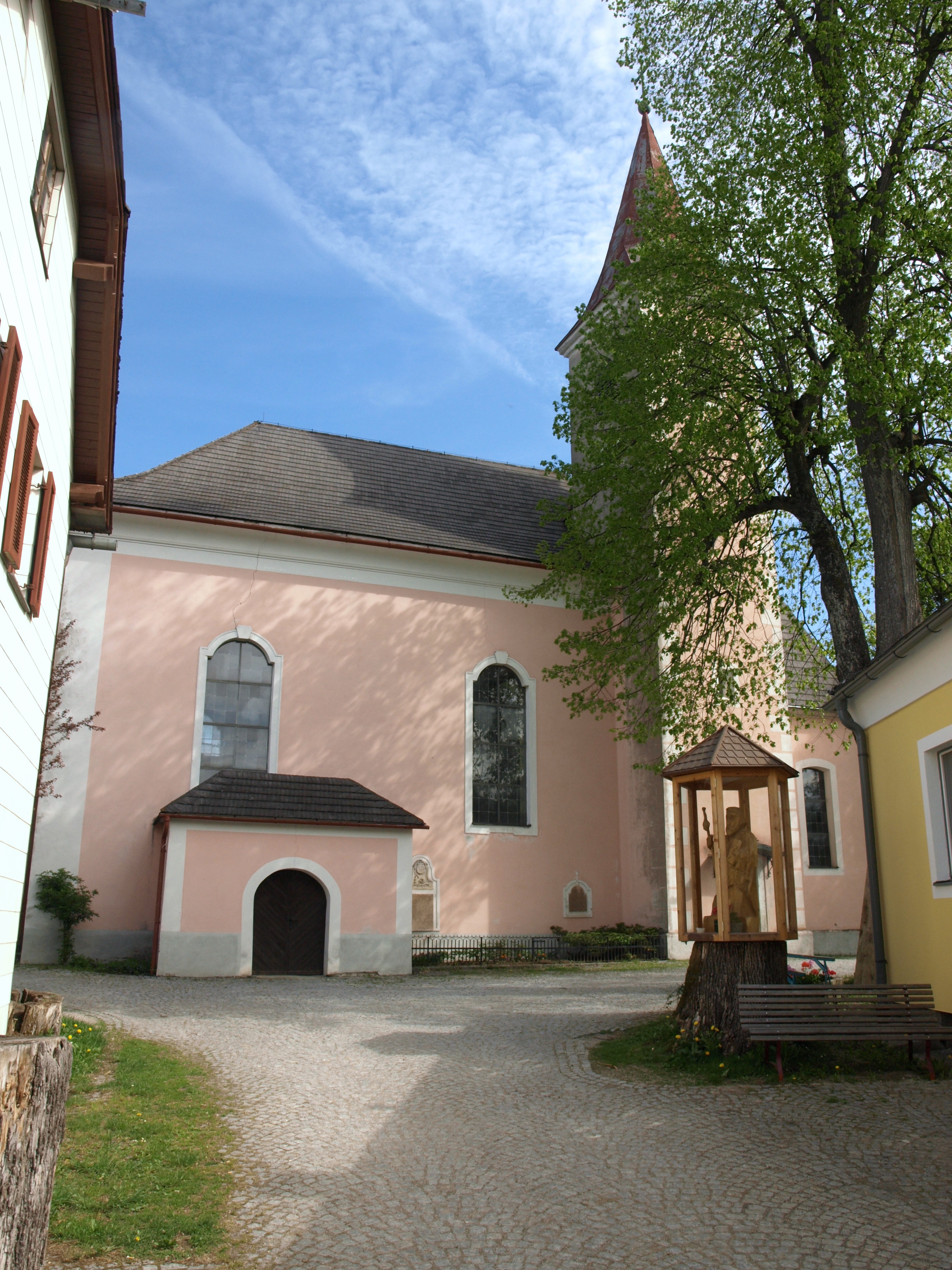
- Altmelon parish church

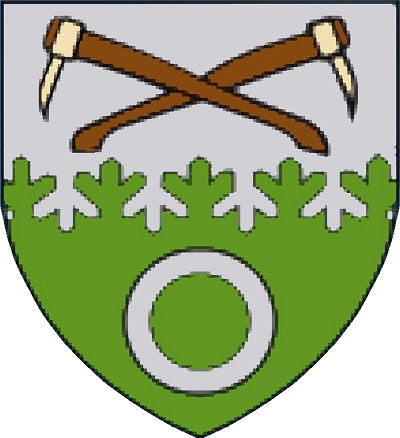
- Coat of arms

- Location within Austria
- Coordinates: 48°27′00″N 14°58′00″E
- Country: Austria
- State: Lower Austria
- District: Zwettl

Government
  - Mayor: Josef Auer (ÖVP)

Area
  - Total: 38.34 km^{2} (14.80 sq mi)
- Elevation: 880 m (2,890 ft)

Population (2018-01-01)
  - Total: 862
  - Density: 22.5/km^{2} (58.2/sq mi)
- Time zone: UTC+1 (CET)
  - Summer (DST): UTC+2 (CEST)
- Postal code: 3925
- Area code: 0 28 13
- Vehicle registration: ZT
- Website: www.altmelon.at

Altmelon is a municipality in the district of Zwettl in the Austrian state of Lower Austria.

== Population ==
Historical population
Year	Pop.	±%
1971	1,053	—
1981	924	−12.3%
1991	922	−0.2%
2011	864	−6.3%
