= Bad Traunstein =

- Municipality
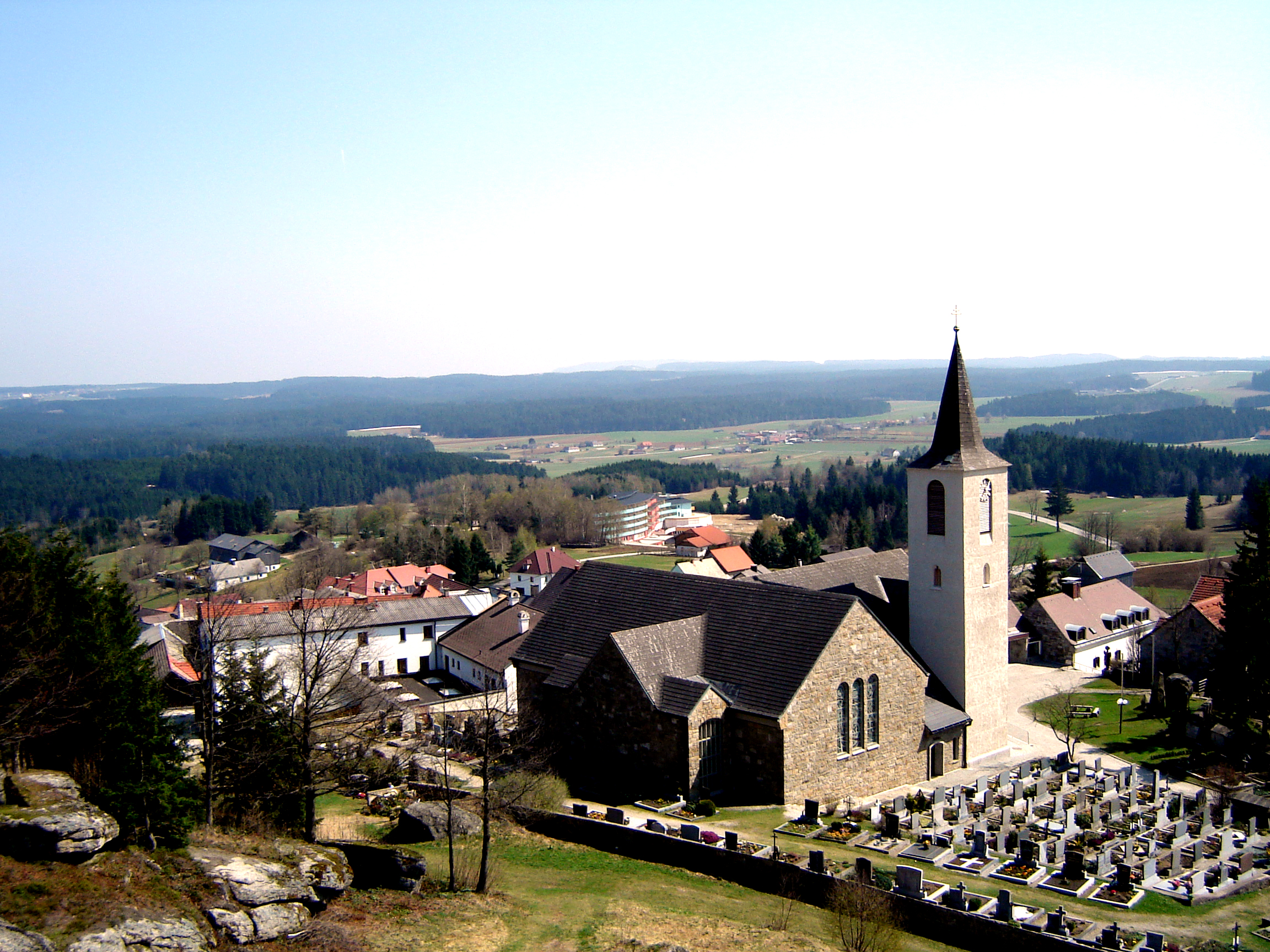
- Church of Saint George

- Coat of arms

- Location within Austria
- Coordinates: 48°25′00″N 15°05′00″E
- Country: Austria
- State: Lower Austria
- District: Zwettl

Government
  - Mayor: Roland Zimmer (ÖVP)

Area
  - Total: 47.42 km^{2} (18.31 sq mi)
- Elevation: 923 m (3,028 ft)

Population (2018-01-01)
  - Total: 1,036
  - Density: 21.85/km^{2} (56.58/sq mi)
- Time zone: UTC+1 (CET)
  - Summer (DST): UTC+2 (CEST)
- Postal code: 3632
- Area code: 02878
- Vehicle registration: ZT
- Website: www.traunstein.gv.at

Bad Traunstein (formerly Traunstein) is a market town and municipality in the district of Zwettl in the Austrian state of Lower Austria. In 2010 its official name was changed into Bad Traunstein, referring to the local spa complex that had been opened a few years earlier (cf. German bad 'spa').

== Population ==
Historical population
Year	Pop.	±%
1971	1,274	—
1981	1,244	−2.4%
1991	1,121	−9.9%
2001	1,089	−2.9%
