= Echsenbach =

- Municipality
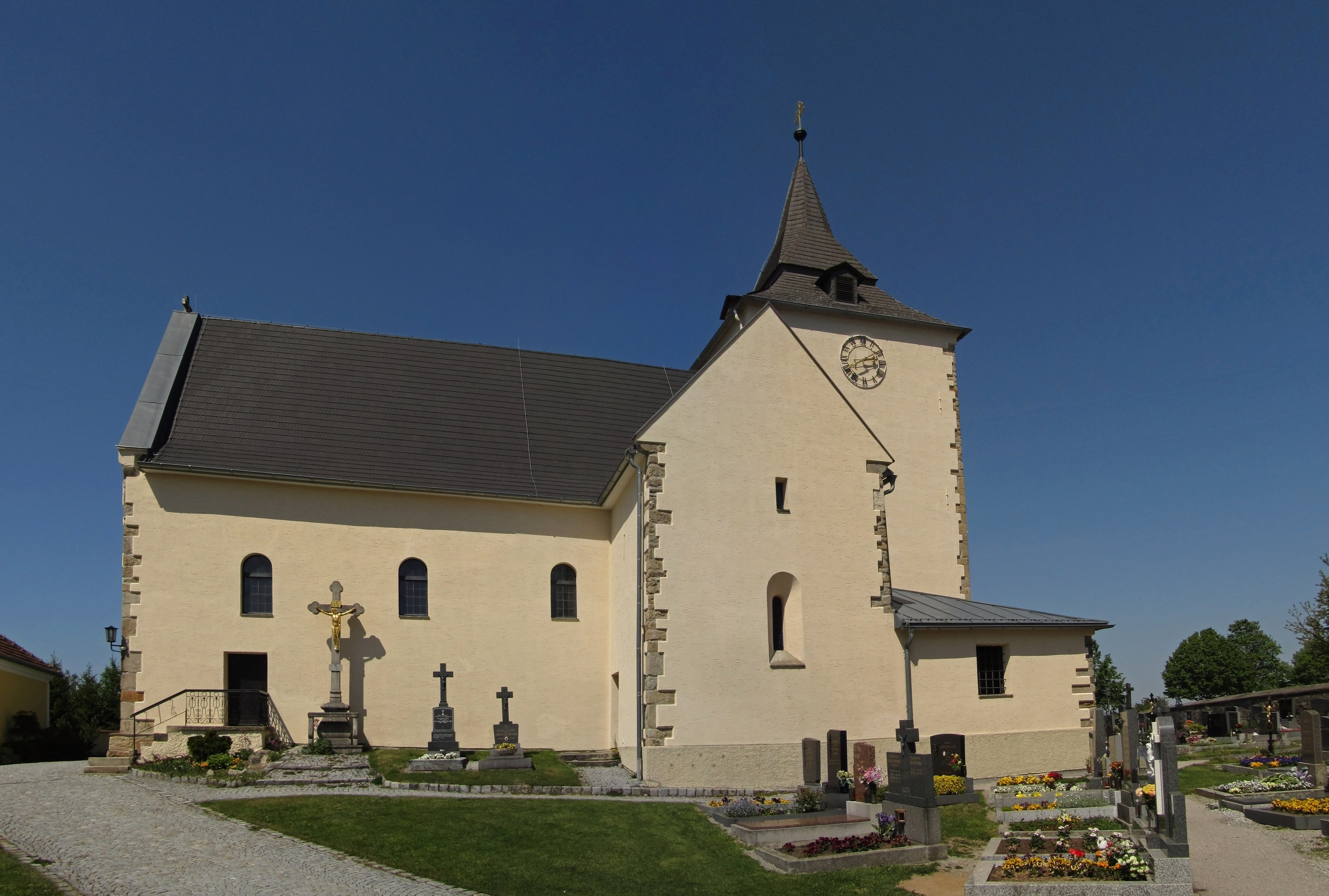
- Echsenbach parish church

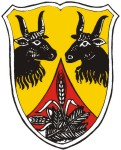
- Coat of arms

- Location within Austria
- Coordinates: 48°43′00″N 15°12′00″E
- Country: Austria
- State: Lower Austria
- District: Zwettl

Government
  - Mayor: Josef Baireder

Area
  - Total: 23.16 km^{2} (8.94 sq mi)
- Elevation: 572 m (1,877 ft)

Population (2018-01-01)
  - Total: 1,256
  - Density: 54.23/km^{2} (140.5/sq mi)
- Time zone: UTC+1 (CET)
  - Summer (DST): UTC+2 (CEST)
- Postal code: 3903
- Area code: 02849
- Vehicle registration: ZT
- Website: www.echsenbach.gv.at

Echsenbach is a municipality in the district of Zwettl in the Austrian state of Lower Austria.

== Population ==
Historical population
Year	Pop.	±%
1971	1,315	—
1981	1,214	−7.7%
1991	1,259	+3.7%
2001	1,249	−0.8%
