= Flugplatz Ottenschlag =

Airport in Austria

Ottenschlag Airport Flugplatz Ottenschlag
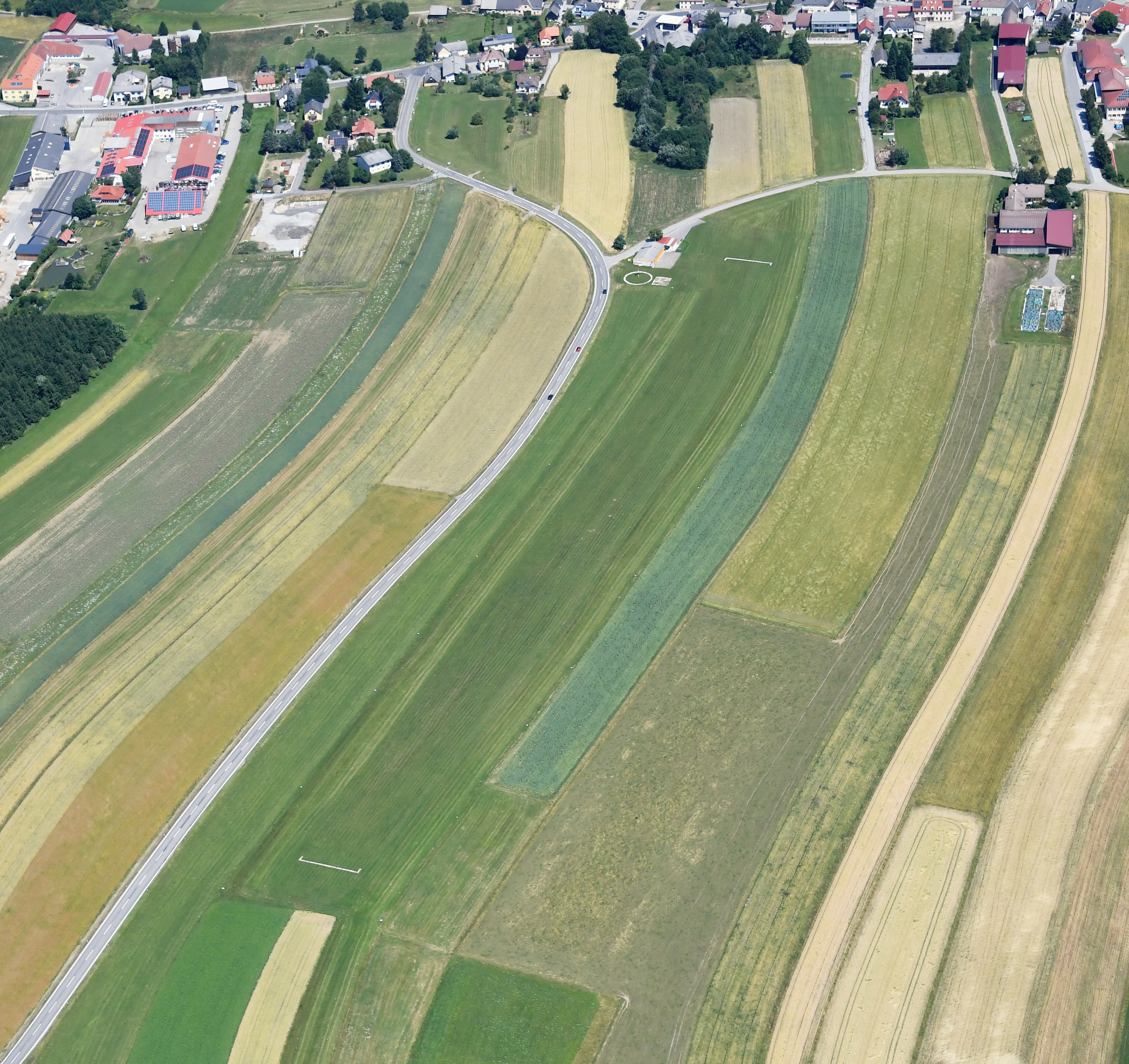
- IATA: none; ICAO: LOAA

Summary
- Airport type: Private
- Serves: Ottenschlag
- Location: Austria
- Elevation AMSL: 2,877 ft / 877 m
- Coordinates: 48°25′6.5″N 015°12′55.1″E

Map
- Location of Ottenschlag Airport in Austria

Runways
Direction	Length		Surface
Direction	ft	m	Surface
03/21	1,830	558	Grass
- Source: Landings.com

Ottenschlag Airport (German: Flugplatz Ottenschlag, ICAO: LOAA) is a private use airport located 1 kilometre (1 mi) south-southwest of Ottenschlag, Lower Austria, Austria.

== See also ==
- List of airports in Austria
