= Rappottenstein =

- Municipality
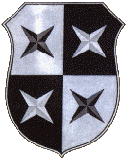
- Coat of arms

- Location within Austria
- Coordinates: 48°31′00″N 15°04′00″E
- Country: Austria
- State: Lower Austria
- District: Zwettl

Government
  - Mayor: Friedrich Wagner (ÖVP)

Area
  - Total: 65.77 km^{2} (25.39 sq mi)
- Elevation: 671 m (2,201 ft)

Population (2018-01-01)
  - Total: 1,724
  - Density: 26.21/km^{2} (67.89/sq mi)
- Time zone: UTC+1 (CET)
  - Summer (DST): UTC+2 (CEST)
- Postal code: 3911
- Area code: 02828
- Vehicle registration: ZT
- Website: www.rappottenstein.at

Rappottenstein is a municipality in the district of Zwettl in the Austrian state of Lower Austria.

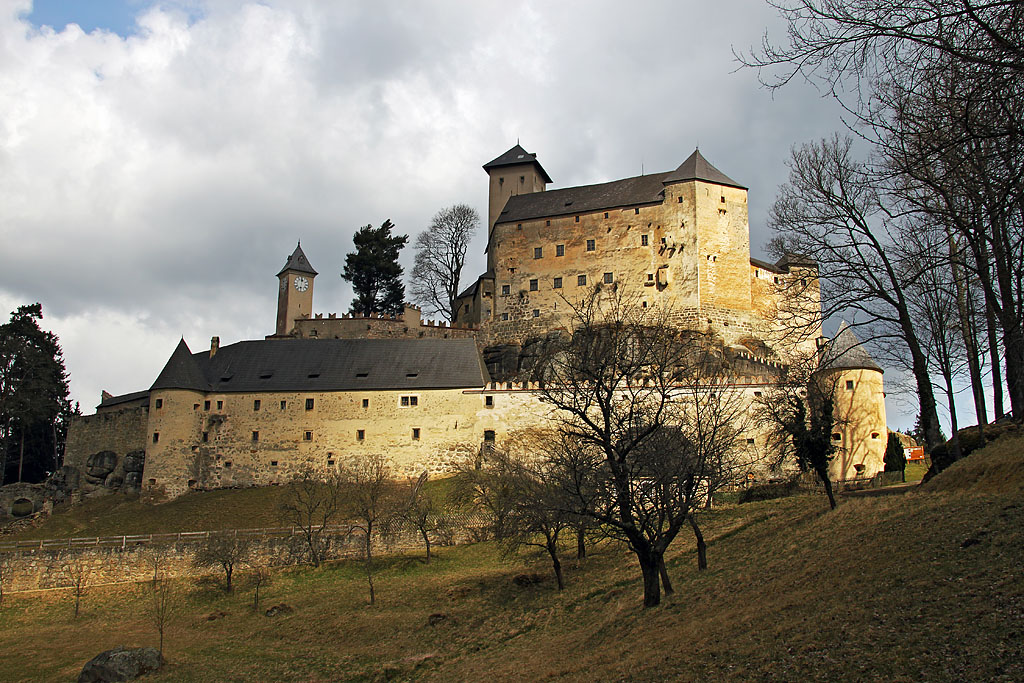
Rappottenstein castle

== Gallery ==
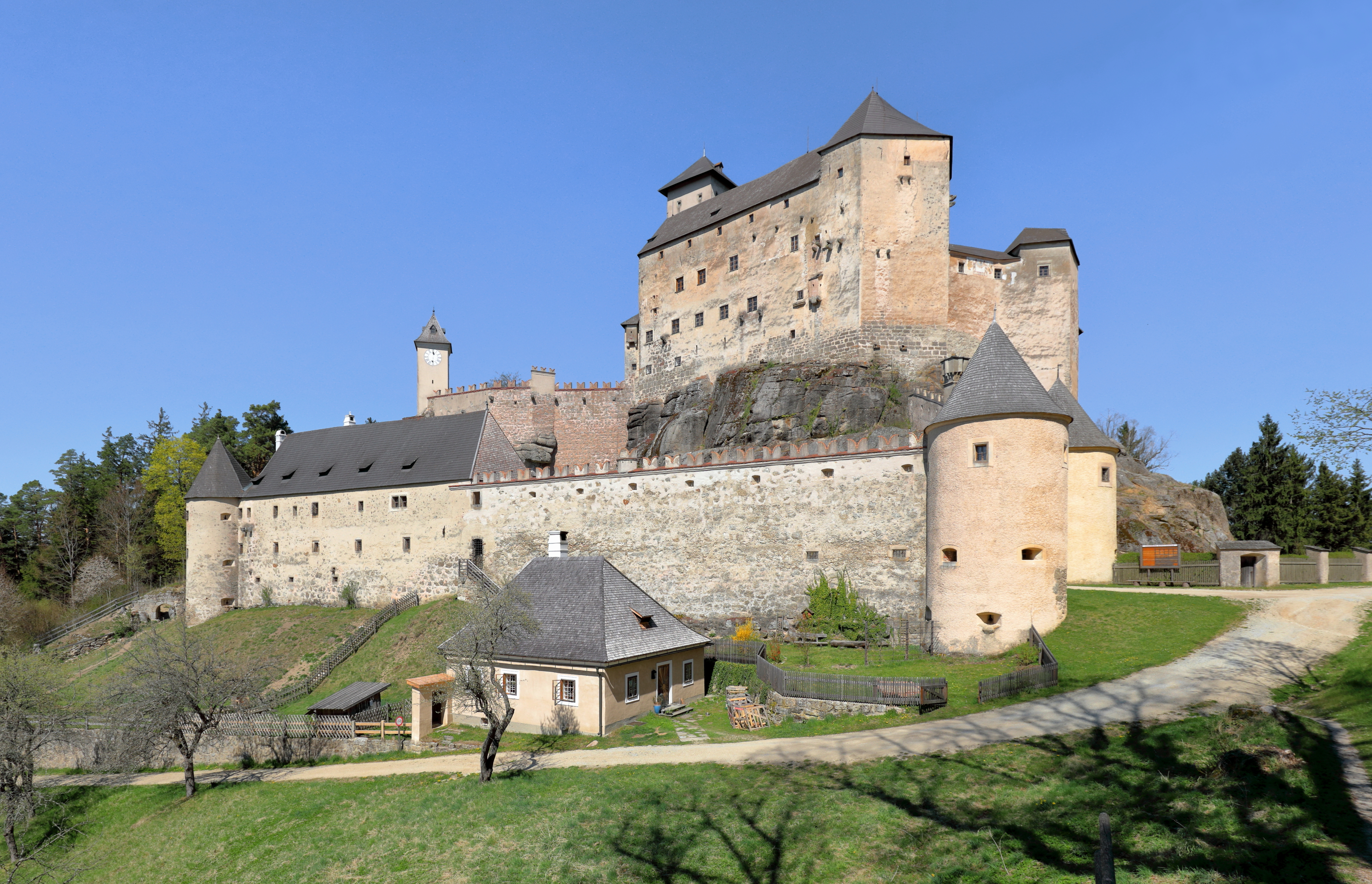
Rappottestein Castle

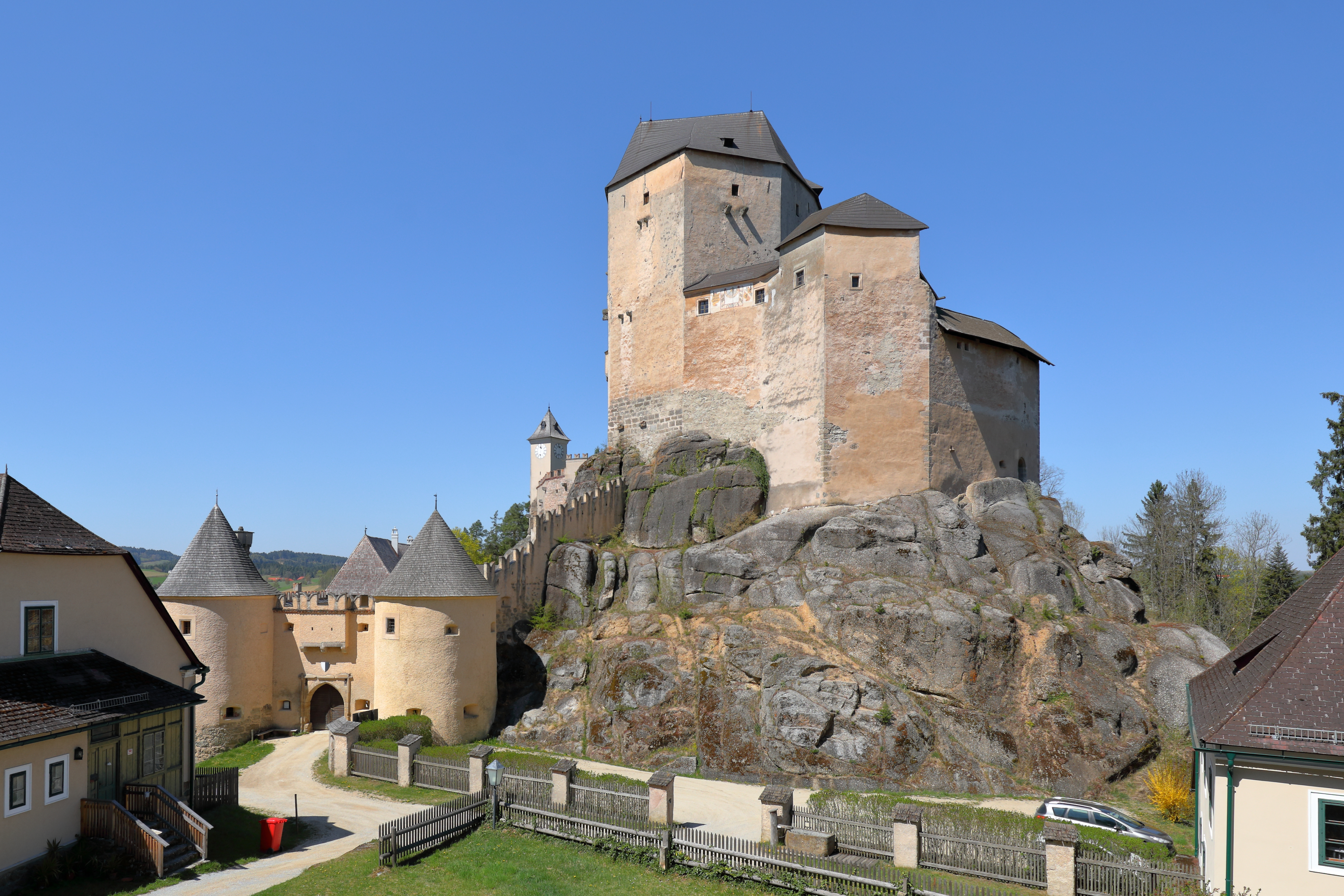
Rappottenstein Castle

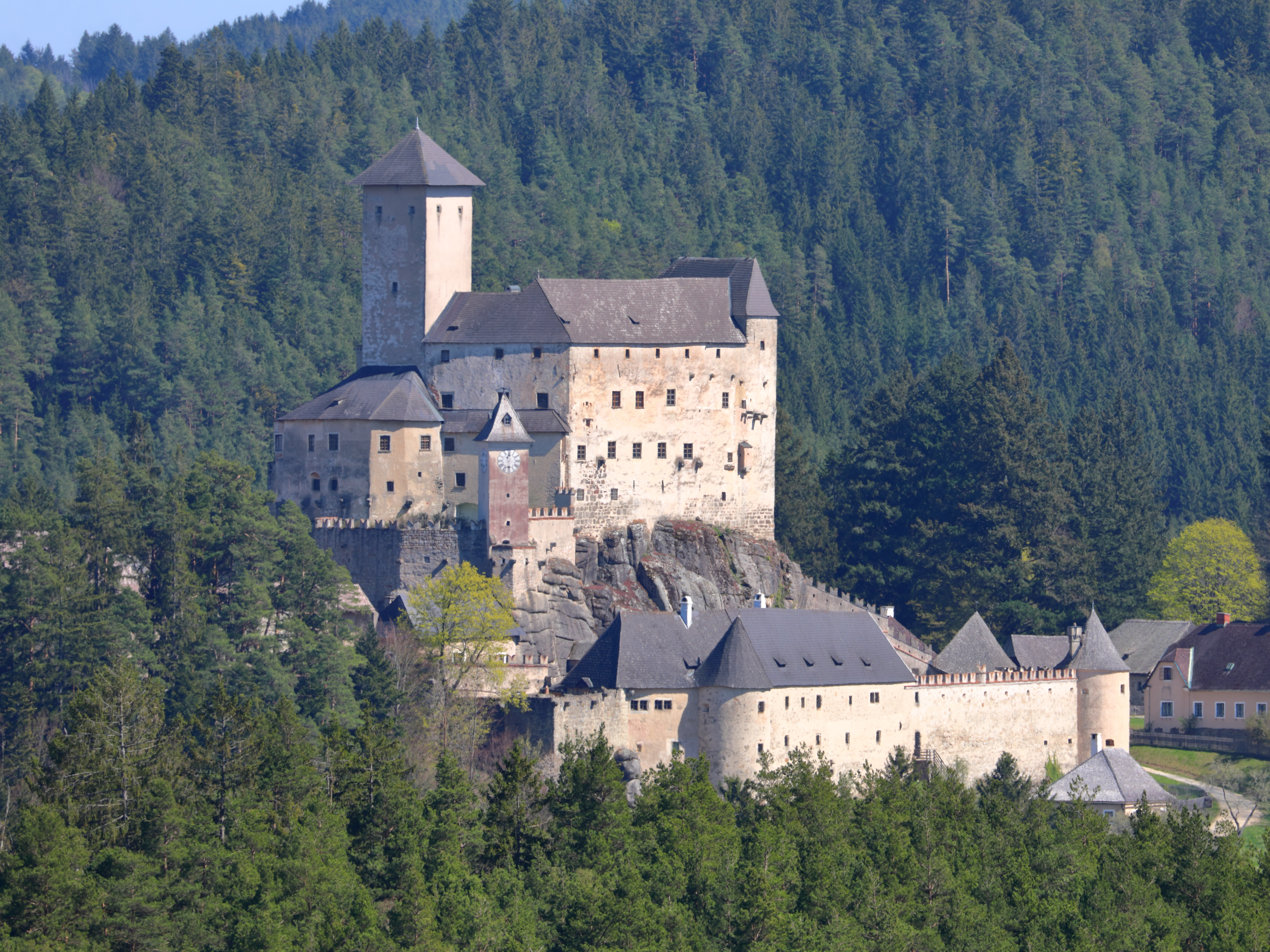
Rappottenstein Castle

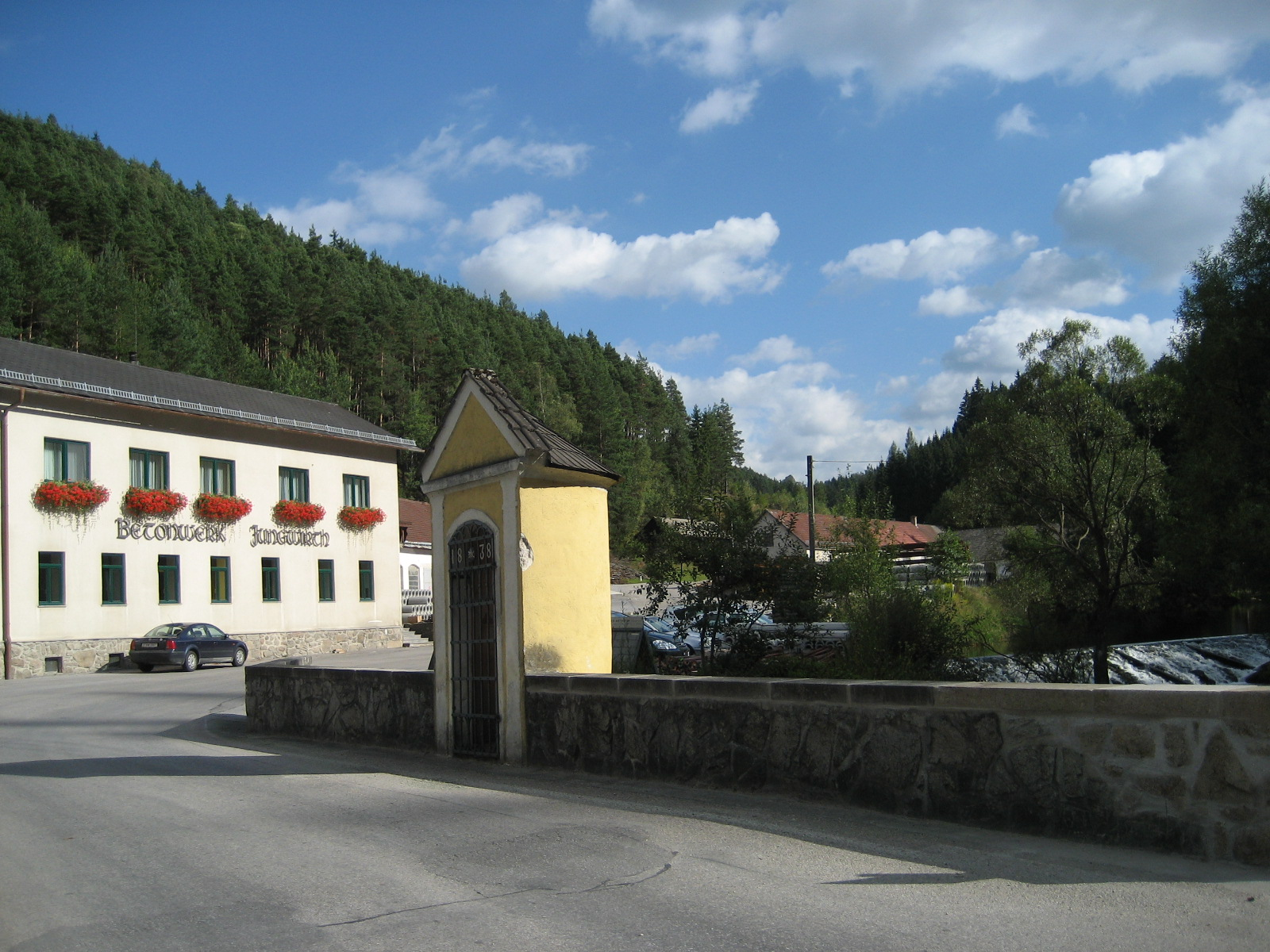
View in Rappottenstein

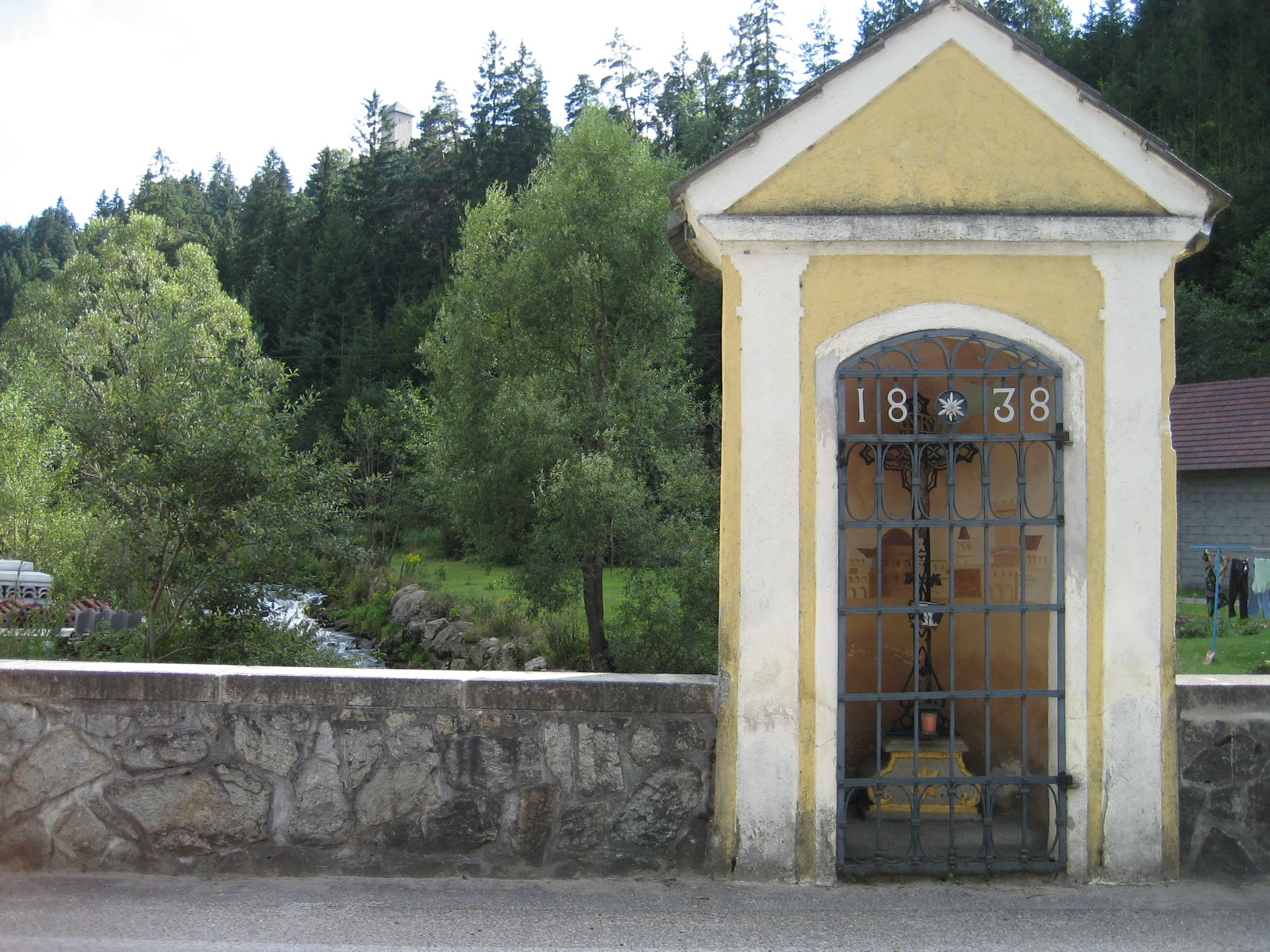
Rappottenstein Shrine by roadside

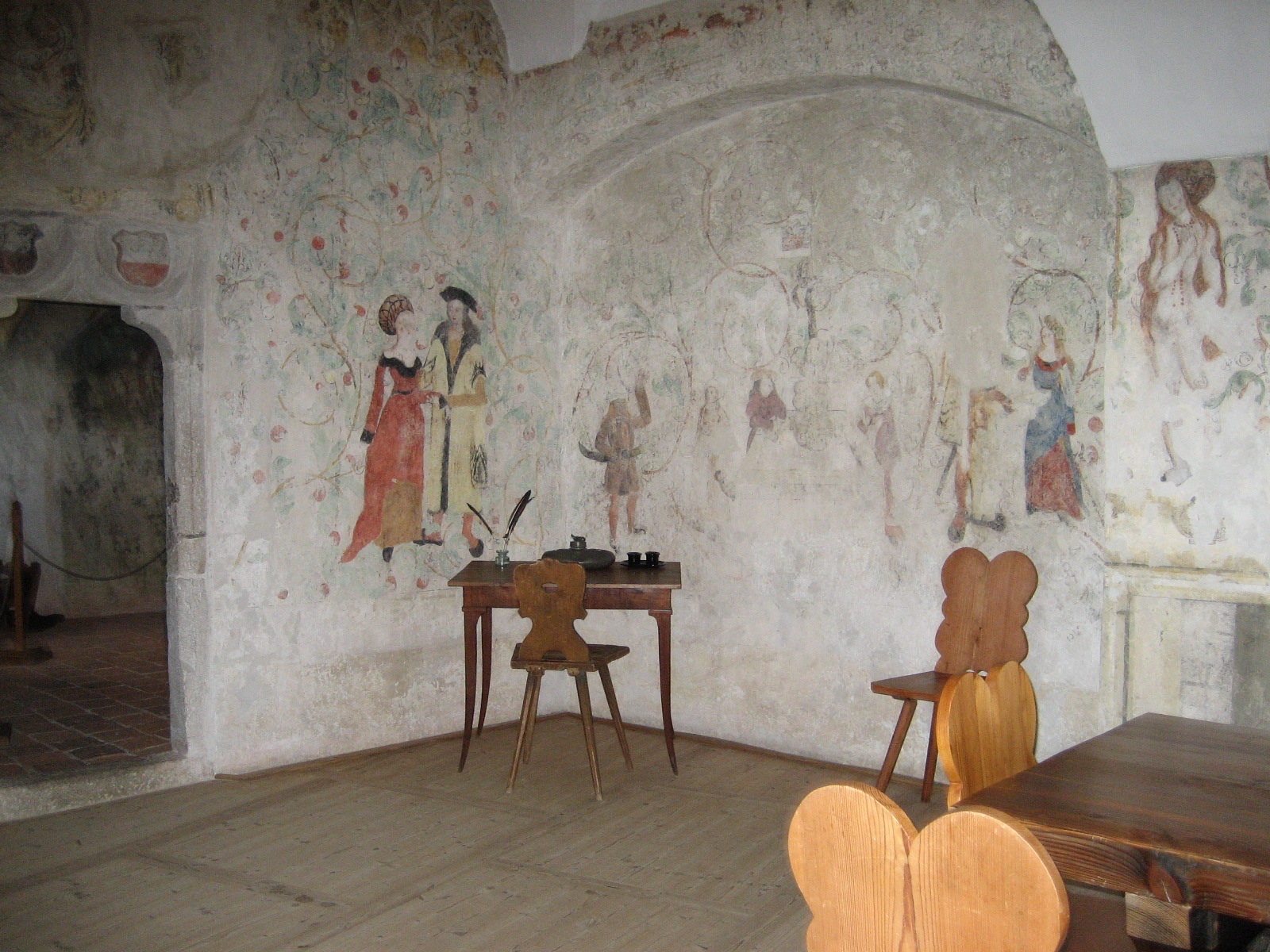
Rappotenstein Painted room in Castle

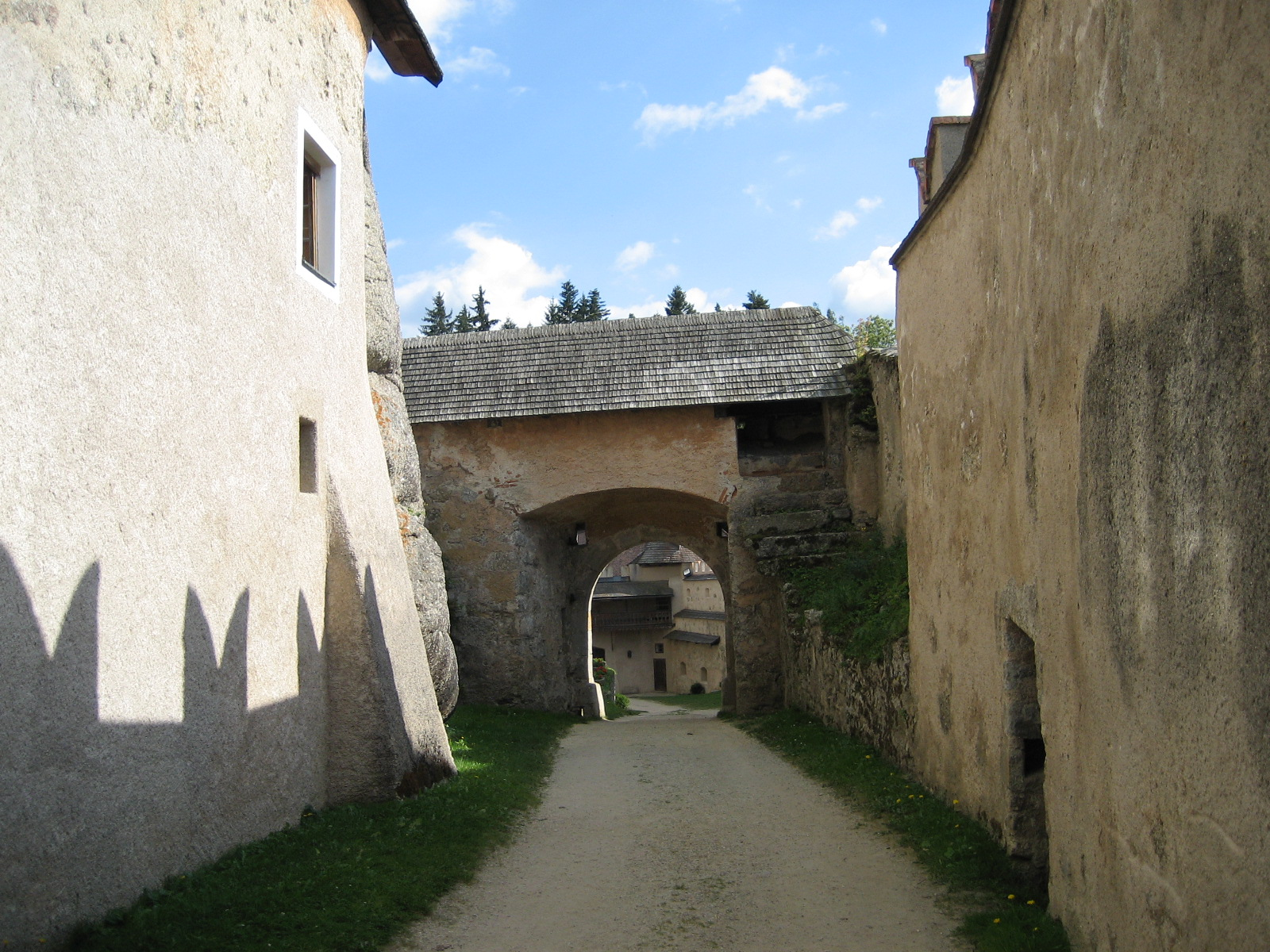
Rappotenstein Castle Lower gateway

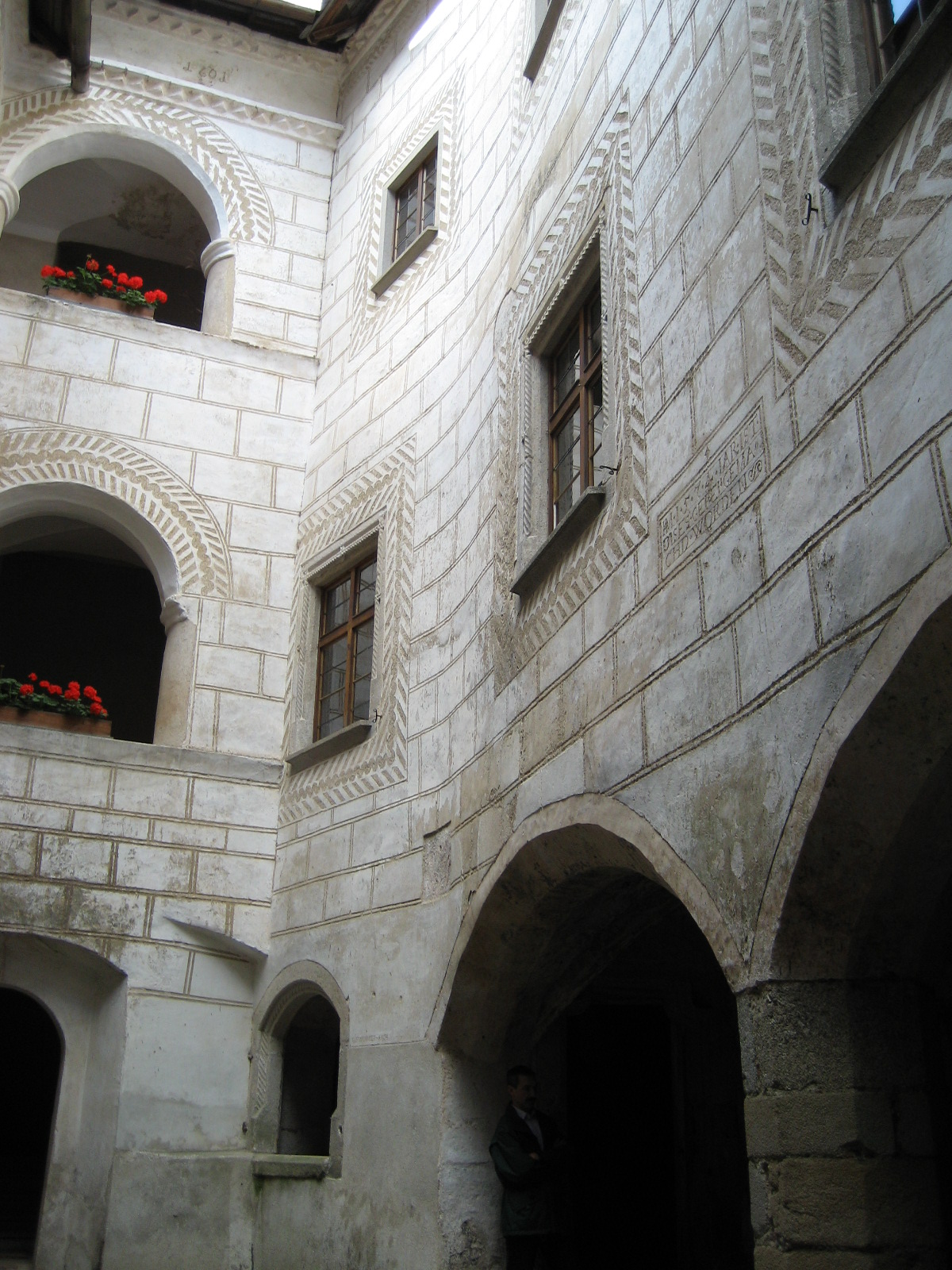
Rappottenstein Castle Courtyard
