= Groß Gerungs =

Municipality in Lower Austria, Austria

- Municipality
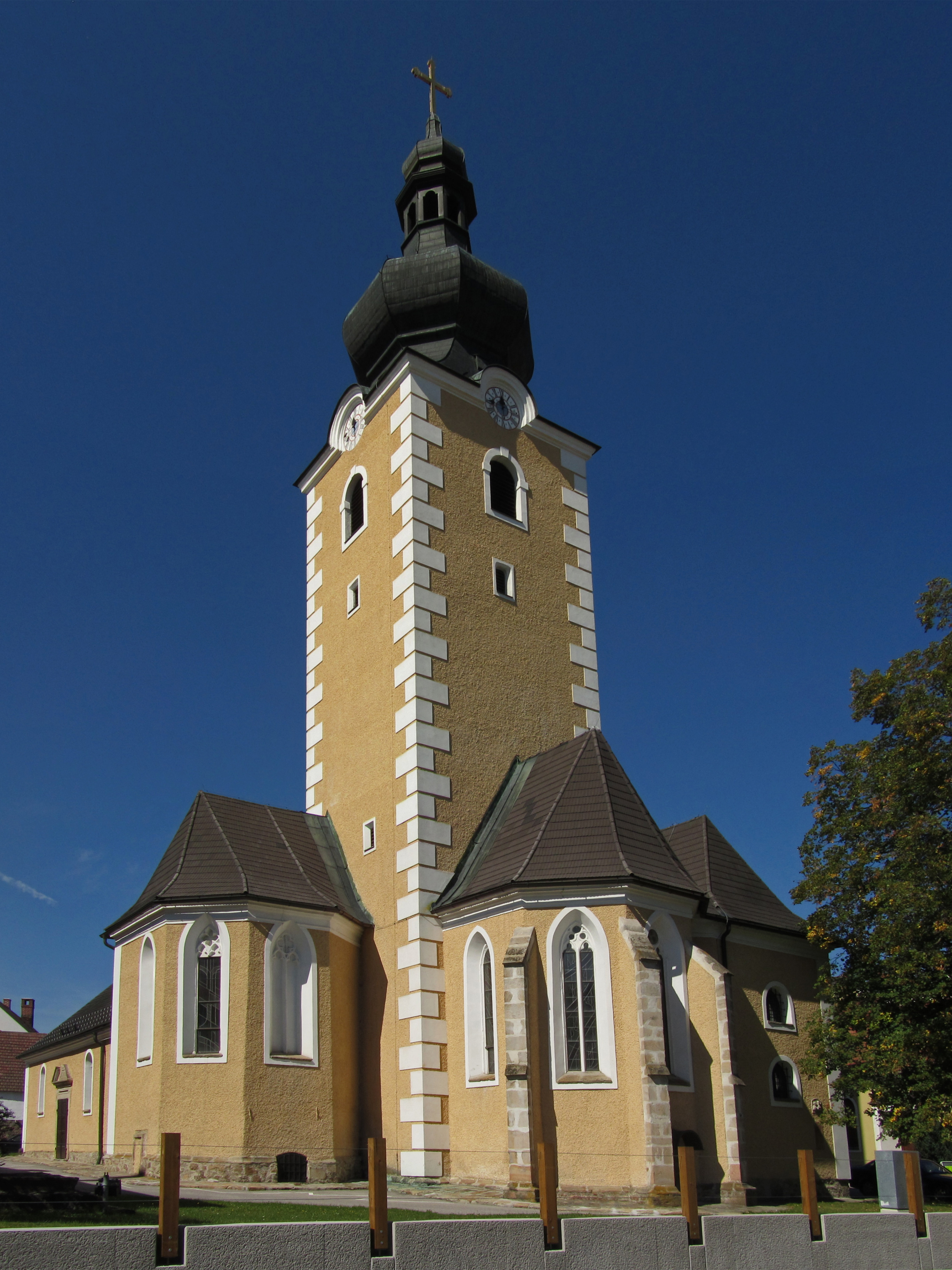
- Groß Gerungs parish church

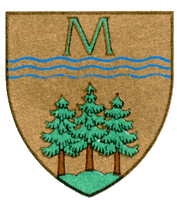
- Coat of arms

- Location within Austria
- Coordinates: 48°34′00″N 14°57′00″E
- Country: Austria
- State: Lower Austria
- District: Zwettl

Government
  - Mayor: Maximilian Igelsböck (ÖVP)

Area
  - Total: 105.92 km^{2} (40.90 sq mi)
- Elevation: 675 m (2,215 ft)

Population (2018-01-01)
  - Total: 4,506
  - Density: 42.54/km^{2} (110.2/sq mi)
- Time zone: UTC+1 (CET)
  - Summer (DST): UTC+2 (CEST)
- Postal code: 3920
- Area code: 02812
- Vehicle registration: ZT
- Website: www.gerungs.at

Groß Gerungs (German pronunciation: [ɡʁoːs ˈɡeːʁʊŋs]) is a municipality in the district of Zwettl in the Austrian state of Lower Austria.

== Population ==
Historical population
Year	Pop.	±%
1869	5,787	—
1880	5,809	+0.4%
1890	5,686	−2.1%
1900	5,765	+1.4%
1910	5,895	+2.3%
1923	5,516	−6.4%
1934	5,440	−1.4%
1939	5,537	+1.8%
1951	4,990	−9.9%
1961	4,976	−0.3%
1971	5,091	+2.3%
1981	5,899	+15.9%
1991	4,812	−18.4%
2001	4,820	+0.2%
2011	4,642	−3.7%
