= Sallingberg =

- Municipality
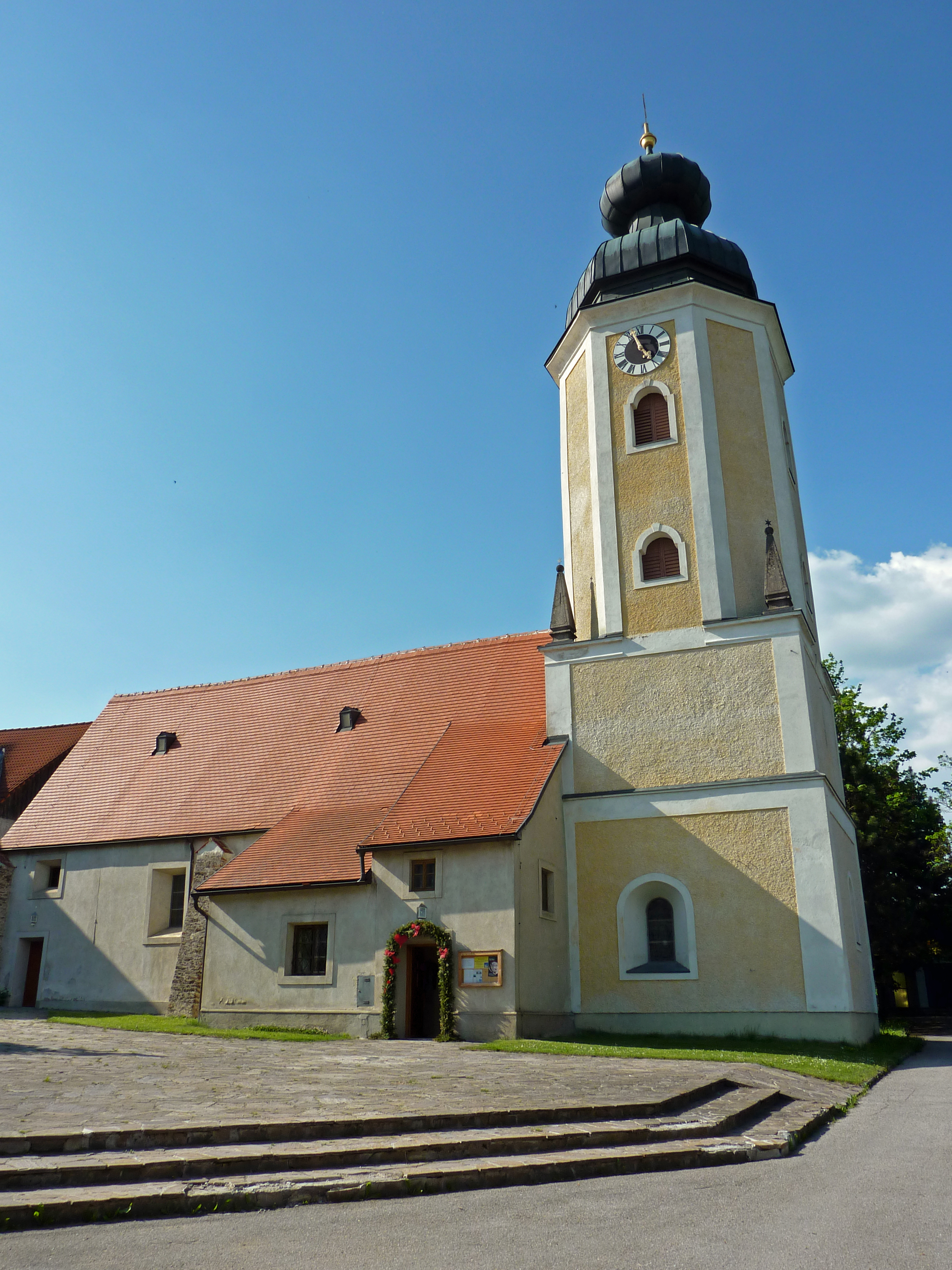
- Sallingberg parish church

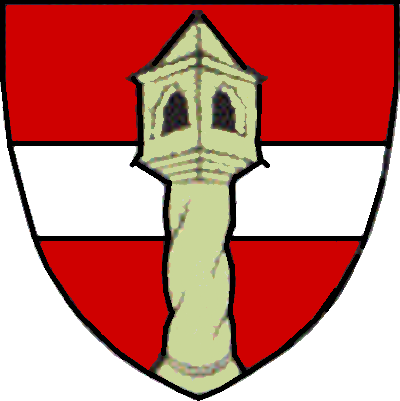
- Coat of arms

- Location within Austria
- Coordinates: 48°28′00″N 15°13′58″E
- Country: Austria
- State: Lower Austria
- District: Zwettl

Government
  - Mayor: Leopold Bock (ÖVP)

Area
  - Total: 51.62 km^{2} (19.93 sq mi)
- Elevation: 766 m (2,513 ft)

Population (2018-01-01)
  - Total: 1,291
  - Density: 25.01/km^{2} (64.77/sq mi)
- Time zone: UTC+1 (CET)
  - Summer (DST): UTC+2 (CEST)
- Postal code: 3525
- Area code: 02877
- Vehicle registration: ZT
- Website: www.sallingberg.at

Sallingberg is a municipality in the district of Zwettl in the Austrian state of Lower Austria.

== Population ==
Historical population
| Year | Pop. | ±% |
|---|---|---|
| 1971 | 1,619 | — |
| 1981 | 1,548 | −4.4% |
| 1991 | 1,601 | +3.4% |
| 2001 | 1,471 | −8.1% |
