= Kirchschlag, Zwettl =

Kirchschlag
- Municipality
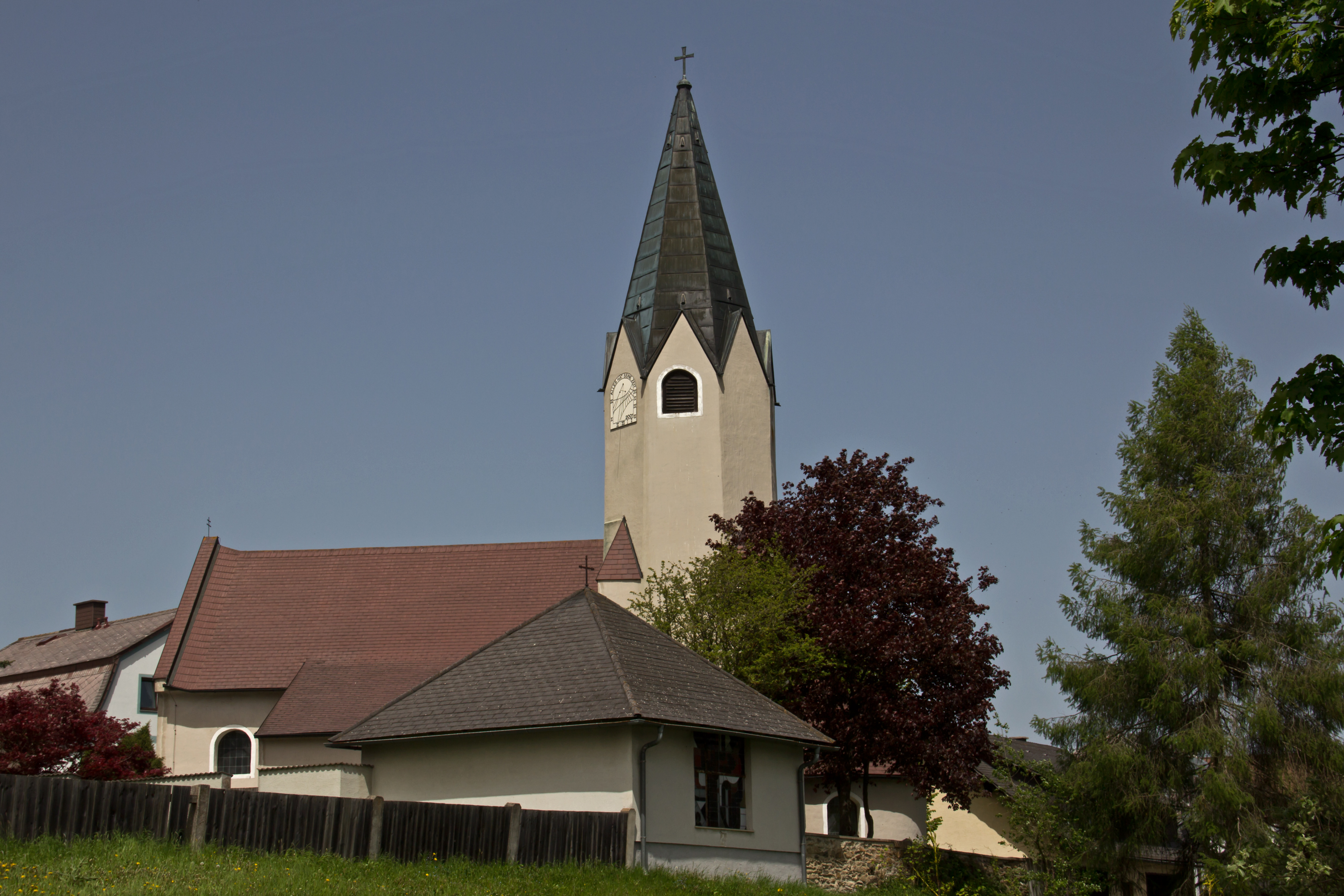
- Kirchschlag parish church

- Coat of arms

- Location within Austria
- Coordinates: 48°23′00″N 15°13′00″E
- Country: Austria
- State: Lower Austria
- District: Zwettl

Government
  - Mayor: Johann Stieger (ÖVP)

Area
  - Total: 29.3 km^{2} (11.3 sq mi)
- Elevation: 820 m (2,690 ft)

Population (2018-01-01)
  - Total: 621
  - Density: 21.2/km^{2} (54.9/sq mi)
- Time zone: UTC+1 (CET)
  - Summer (DST): UTC+2 (CEST)
- Postal code: 3631
- Area code: 02872
- Vehicle registration: ZT
- Website: www.kirchschlag.gv.at

Kirchschlag is a municipality in the district of Zwettl in the Austrian state of Lower Austria.

== Population ==
Historical population
Year	Pop.	±%
1971	883	—
1981	795	−10.0%
1991	738	−7.2%
2001	717	−2.8%
