= Pillichsdorf =

- Municipality
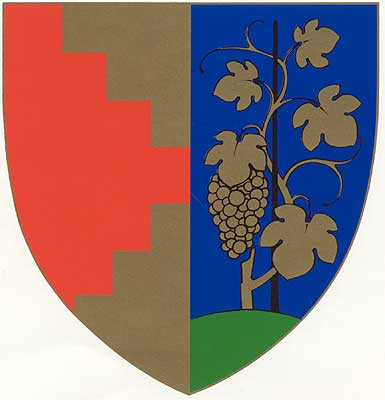
- Coat of arms

- Location within Austria
- Coordinates: 48°22′N 16°32′E
- Country: Austria
- State: Lower Austria
- District: Mistelbach

Government
  - Mayor: Wolfgang Gössinger (2002-2015), Franz Treipl (2015-2019), Erich Trenker (2019-2022), since 2022 Florian Faber

Area
  - Total: 14.33 km^{2} (5.53 sq mi)
- Elevation: 167 m (548 ft)

Population (2018-01-01)
  - Total: 1,157
  - Density: 80.74/km^{2} (209.1/sq mi)
- Time zone: UTC+1 (CET)
  - Summer (DST): UTC+2 (CEST)
- Postal code: 2211
- Area code: 02245
- Website: www.pillichsdorf.at

Pillichsdorf is a town in the district of Mistelbach in the Austrian state of Lower Austria. Pillichsdorf is located on the northern edge of the Marchfeld in the Weinviertel in the north of Deutsch Wagram and next Wolkersdorf and is crossed by the Rußbach.

Pillichsdorf has one of the longest cellar lanes in Central Europe. The municipality is administered by a coalition of the ÖVP and the Greens. The mayor is currently Florian Faber.

== Population ==
Historical population
Year	Pop.	±%
1830	1,125	—
1846	1,134	+0.8%
1851	1,153	+1.7%
1869	1,071	−7.1%
1880	1,133	+5.8%
1890	1,306	+15.3%
1900	1,380	+5.7%
1910	1,408	+2.0%
1923	1,376	−2.3%
1934	1,320	−4.1%
1939	1,258	−4.7%
1951	1,128	−10.3%
1961	1,111	−1.5%
1971	1,089	−2.0%
1981	1,089	+0.0%
1991	1,119	+2.8%
2001	1,119	+0.0%
