= Stronsdorf =

- Municipality
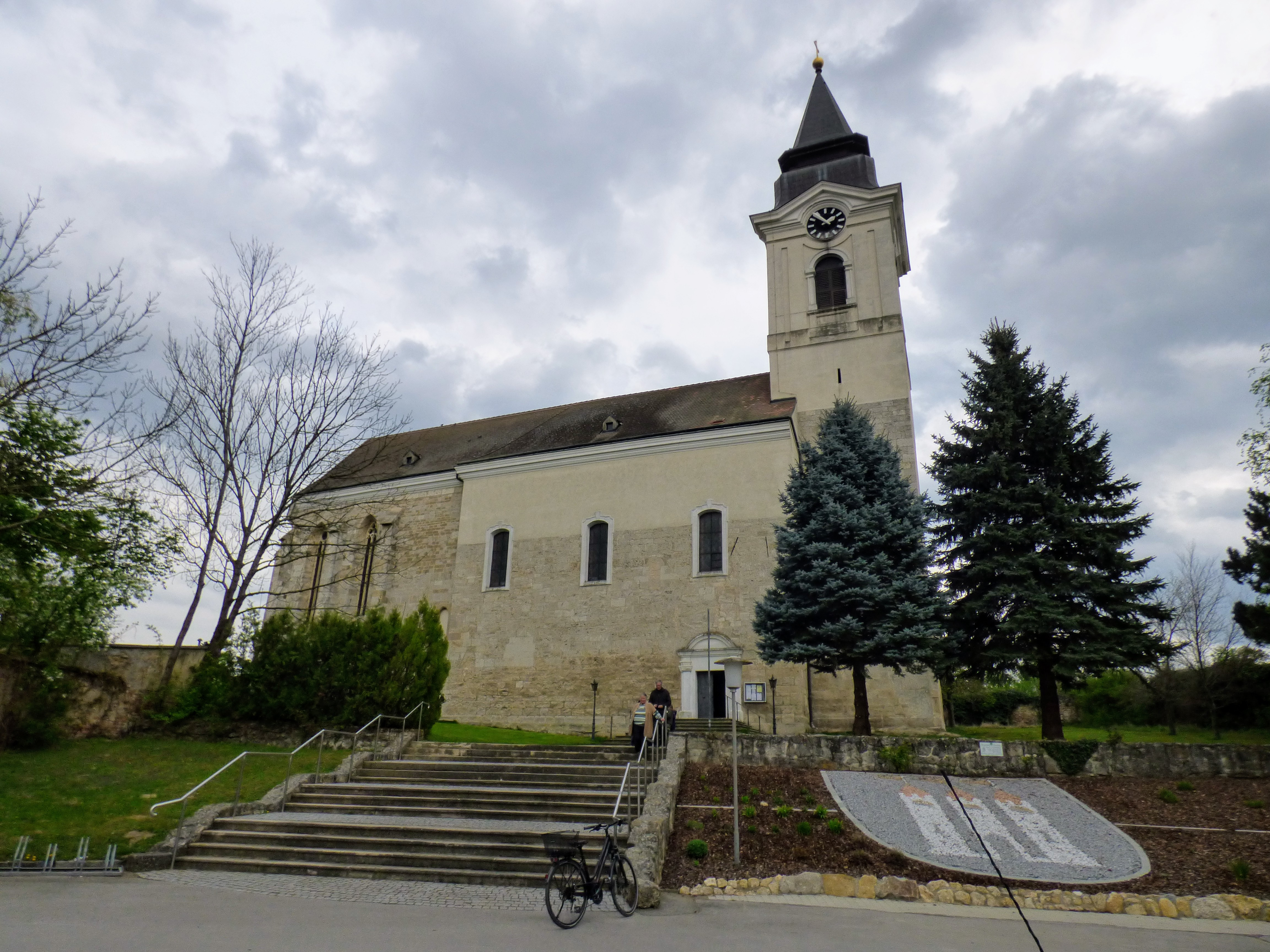
- Stronsdorf parish church

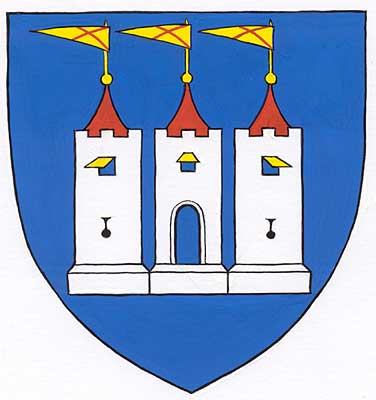
- Coat of arms

- Location within Austria
- Coordinates: 48°39′N 16°18′E
- Country: Austria
- State: Lower Austria
- District: Mistelbach

Government
  - Mayor: Rudolf Riener

Area
  - Total: 48.17 km^{2} (18.60 sq mi)
- Elevation: 211 m (692 ft)

Population (2018-01-01)
  - Total: 1,584
  - Density: 32.88/km^{2} (85.17/sq mi)
- Time zone: UTC+1 (CET)
  - Summer (DST): UTC+2 (CEST)
- Postal code: 2153
- Area code: 02526
- Website: www.stronsdorf.at

Stronsdorf is a town in the district of Mistelbach in the Austrian state of Lower Austria.

== Population ==
Historical population
Year	Pop.	±%
1971	1,973	—
1981	1,760	−10.8%
1991	1,668	−5.2%
2001	1,725	+3.4%
