= Ladendorf =

- Municipality
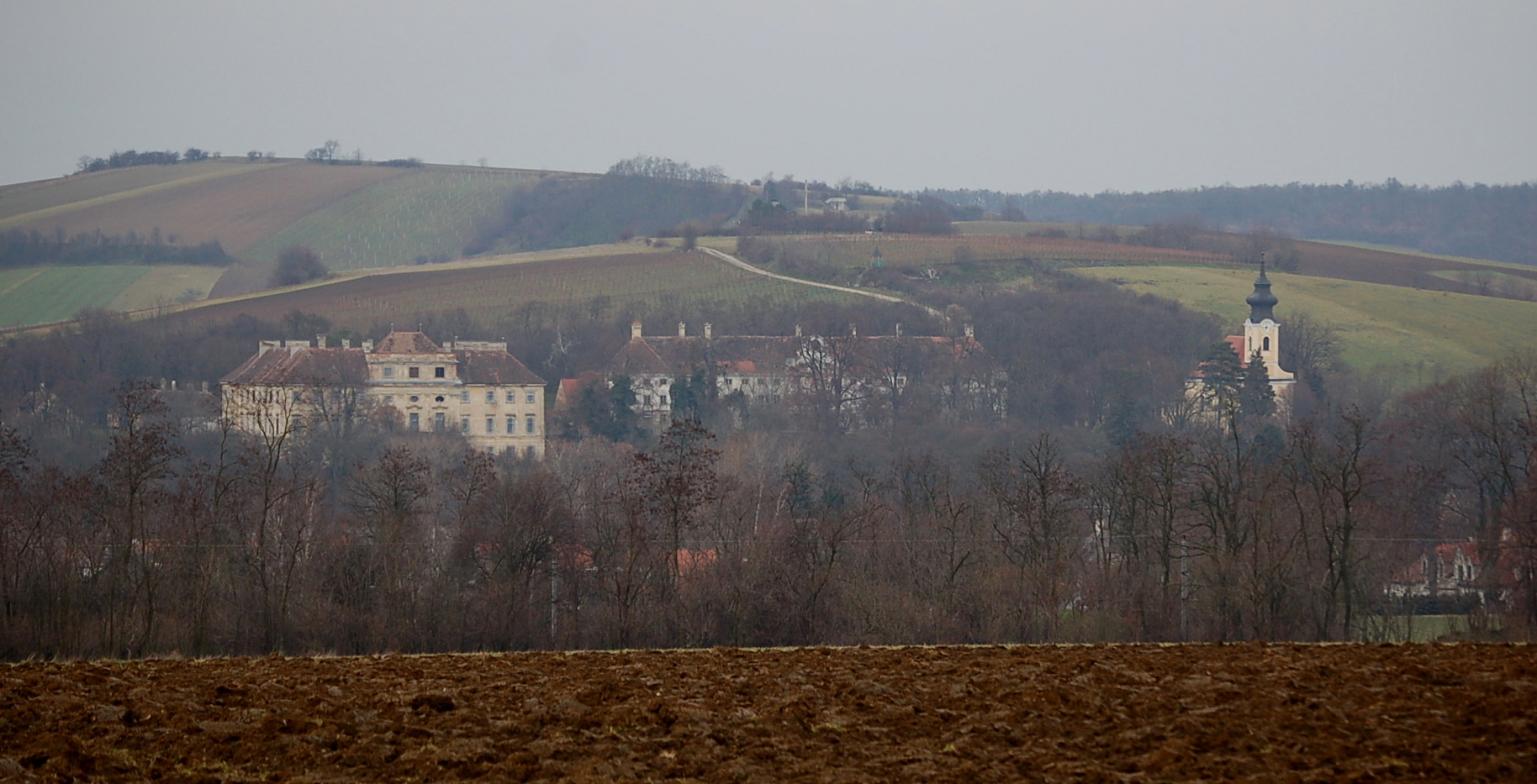

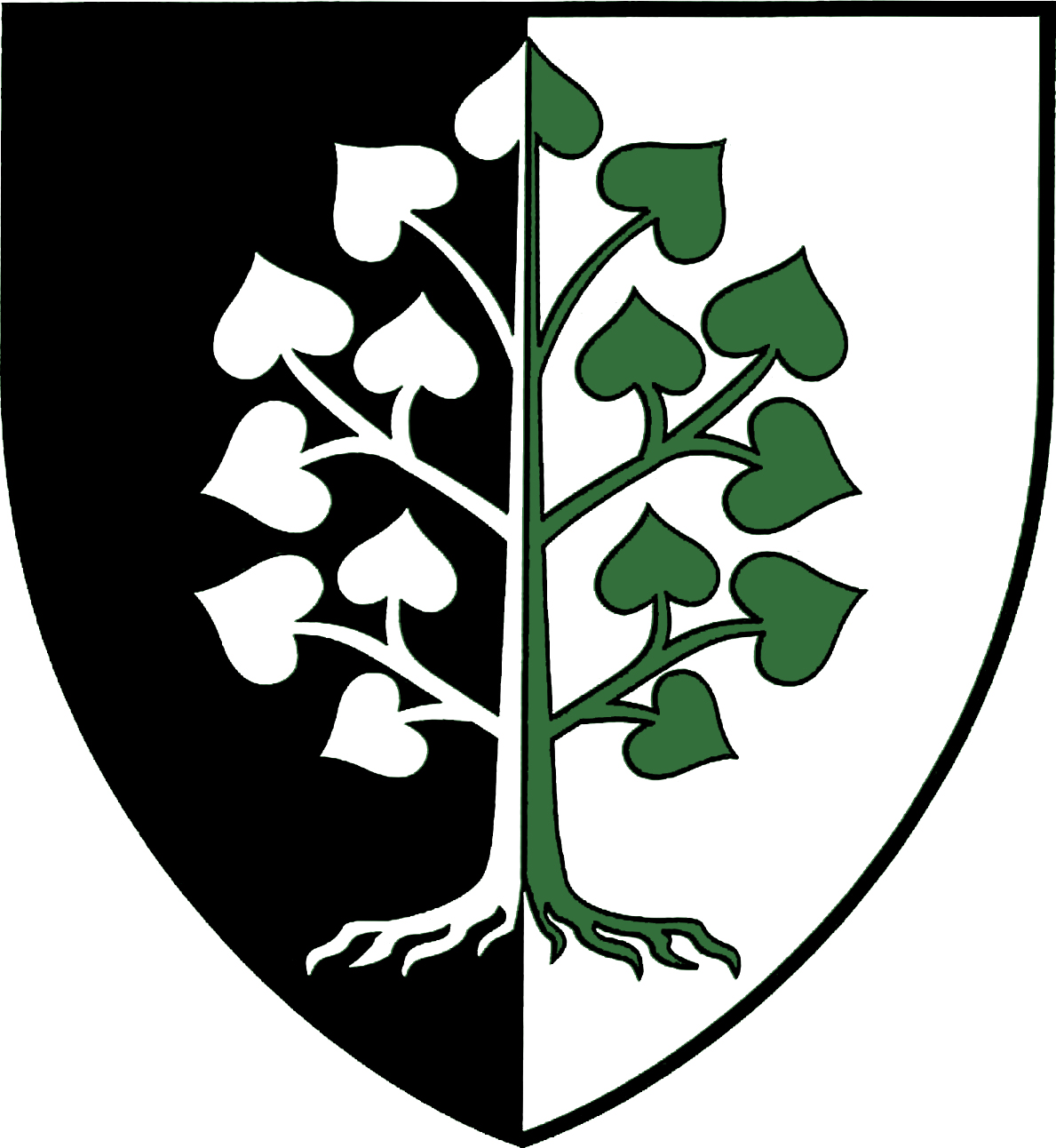
- Coat of arms

- Location within Austria
- Coordinates: 48°32′N 16°29′E
- Country: Austria
- State: Lower Austria
- District: Mistelbach

Government
  - Mayor: Manfred Hager

Area
  - Total: 50.05 km^{2} (19.32 sq mi)
- Elevation: 228 m (748 ft)

Population (2018-01-01)
  - Total: 2,298
  - Density: 45.91/km^{2} (118.9/sq mi)
- Time zone: UTC+1 (CET)
  - Summer (DST): UTC+2 (CEST)
- Postal code: 2126
- Area code: 02575
- Website: www.ladendorf.at

Ladendorf is a town in the district of Mistelbach in the Austrian state of Lower Austria.

== Population ==
Historical population
Year	Pop.	±%
1971	2,118	—
1981	1,876	−11.4%
1991	1,936	+3.2%
2001	2,110	+9.0%
2011	2,241	+6.2%
2021	2,301	+2.7%
