= Wolkersdorf im Weinviertel =

- Municipality
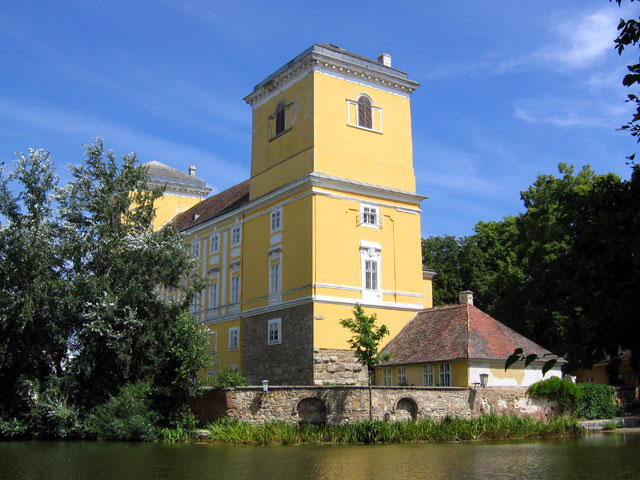
- Schloss Wolkersdorf

- Coat of arms

- Location within Austria
- Coordinates: 48°22′00″N 16°31′00″E
- Country: Austria
- State: Lower Austria
- District: Mistelbach

Government
  - Mayor: Ing. Dominic Litzka (Team Wolkersdorf die Volkspartei)

Area
  - Total: 44.38 km^{2} (17.14 sq mi)
- Elevation: 178 m (584 ft)

Population (2018-01-01)
  - Total: 7,201
  - Density: 162.3/km^{2} (420.2/sq mi)
- Time zone: UTC+1 (CET)
  - Summer (DST): UTC+2 (CEST)
- Postal code: 2120
- Area code: 02245
- Vehicle registration: MI
- Website: https://www.wolkersdorf.at/

Wolkersdorf im Weinviertel is a town in the district of Mistelbach in the Austrian state of Lower Austria. It is situated in the Weinviertel, about 15 km north of Vienna, on the main road from Vienna to Brno (European route E461). The municipality consists of the subdivisions Wolkersdorf, Riedenthal, Pfösing, Obersdorf and Münichsthal. It was elevated to town status in 1969.

== Population ==
Historical population
Year	Pop.	±%
1971	4,669	—
1981	5,062	+8.4%
1991	5,696	+12.5%
2001	6,191	+8.7%
2022	7,379	+19.2%

== Infrastructure ==
Wolkersdorf is connected by road (E461/B7) with Vienna to the south and Gaweinstal and the Czech Republic to the north. Nordautobahn A5 was completed in December 2009. The Wolkersdorf railway station is connected to the Vienna S-Bahn suburban railway network, and is also served by regional trains to Vienna, Mistelbach and Laa an der Thaya.
