= Gnadendorf =

- Municipality
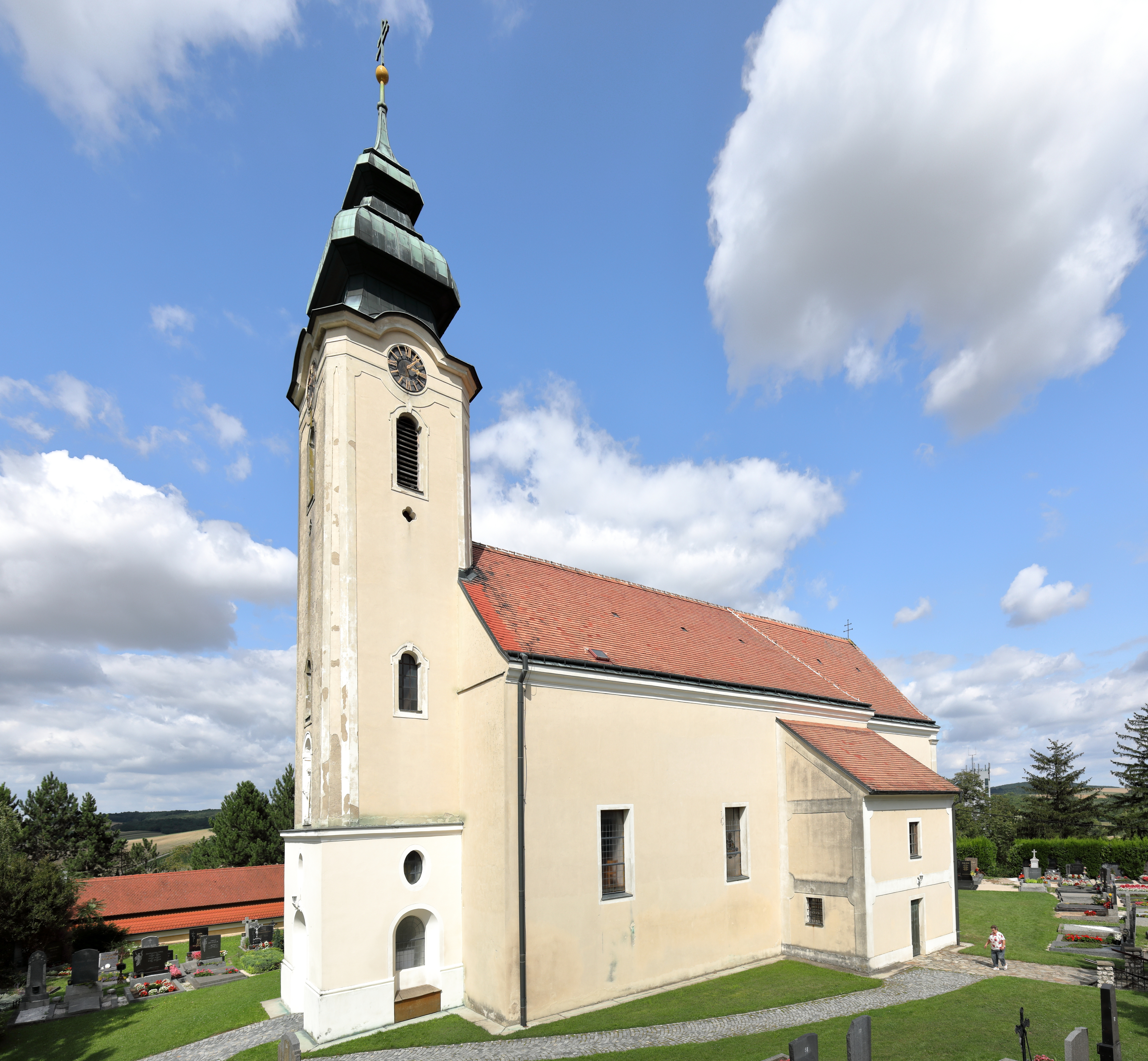
- Gnadendorf parish church

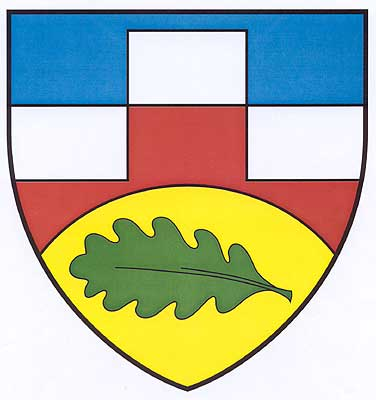
- Coat of arms

- Location within Austria
- Coordinates: 48°37′N 16°24′E
- Country: Austria
- State: Lower Austria
- District: Mistelbach

Government
  - Mayor: Franz Schmidt

Area
  - Total: 48.26 km^{2} (18.63 sq mi)
- Elevation: 272 m (892 ft)

Population (2018-01-01)
  - Total: 1,127
  - Density: 23.35/km^{2} (60.48/sq mi)
- Time zone: UTC+1 (CET)
  - Summer (DST): UTC+2 (CEST)
- Postal code: 2152
- Area code: 02525
- Website: www.gnadendorf.at

Gnadendorf is a town in the district of Mistelbach in the Austrian state of Lower Austria.

== Geography ==
Gnadendorf is located in the valley of the Zaya River.

Subdivisions are:

- Eichenbrunn
- Gnadendorf
- Oedenkirchenwald
- Pyhra
- Röhrabrunn
- Wenzersdorf
- Zwentendorf

== Population ==
Historical population
Year	Pop.	±%
1971	1,401	—
1981	1,230	−12.2%
1991	1,203	−2.2%
2001	1,175	−2.3%
