= Großengersdorf =

- Municipality
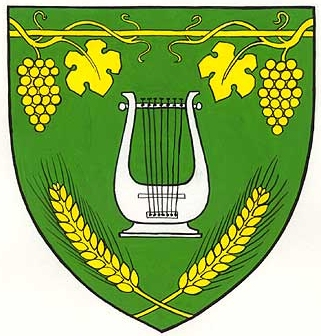
- Coat of arms

- Location within Austria
- Coordinates: 48°21′N 16°34′E
- Country: Austria
- State: Lower Austria
- District: Mistelbach

Government
  - Mayor: Josef Staut

Area
  - Total: 15.57 km^{2} (6.01 sq mi)
- Elevation: 164 m (538 ft)

Population (2018-01-01)
  - Total: 1,478
  - Density: 94.93/km^{2} (245.9/sq mi)
- Time zone: UTC+1 (CET)
  - Summer (DST): UTC+2 (CEST)
- Postal code: 2212
- Area code: 02245
- Website: https://www.grossengersdorf.gv.at/

Großengersdorf is a town in the district of Mistelbach in the Austrian state of Lower Austria.

== Population ==
Historical population
Year	Pop.	±%
1971	1,437	—
1981	1,312	−8.7%
1991	1,341	+2.2%
2001	1,430	+6.6%
