= Rabensburg =

- Municipality
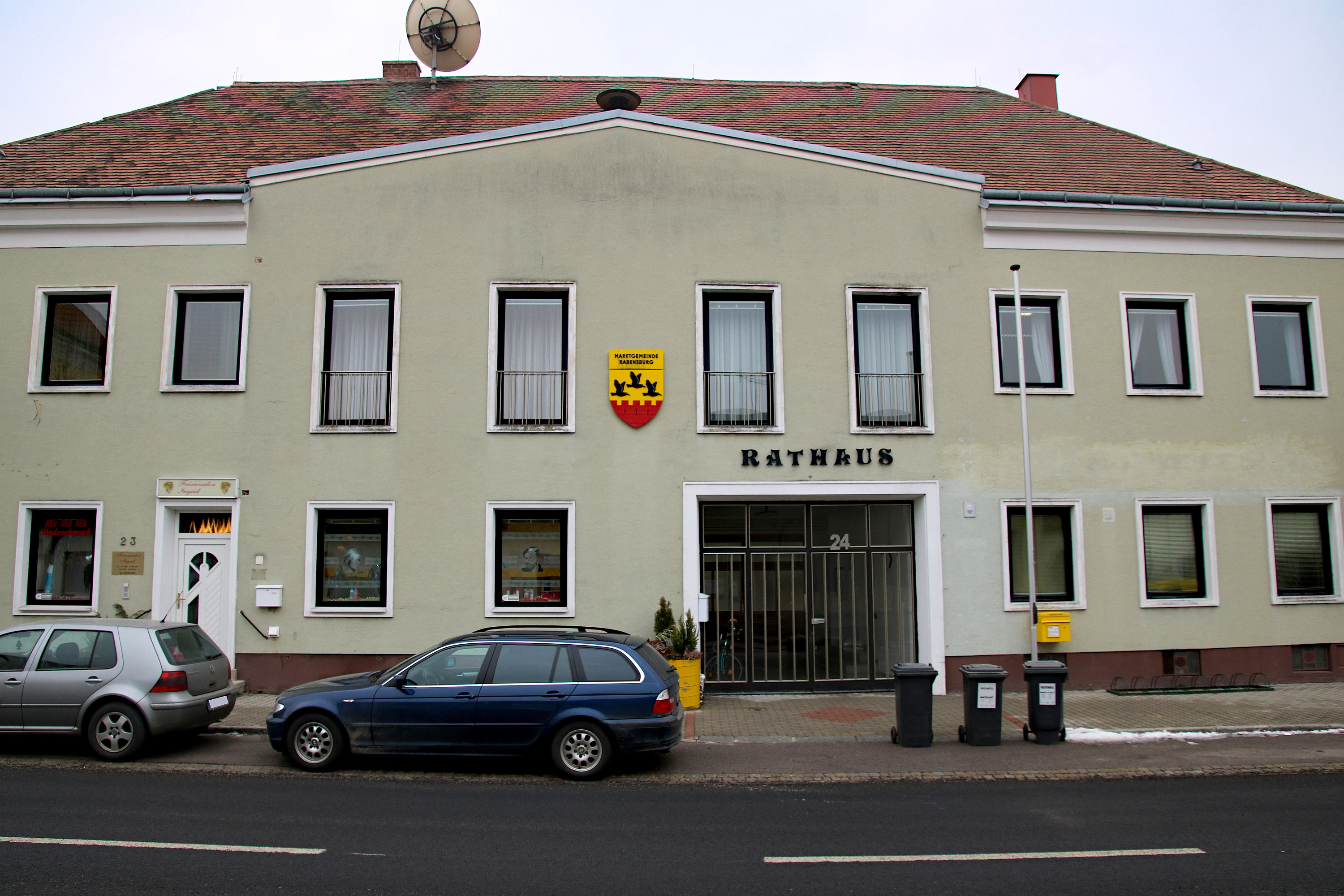
- Municipal office

- Coat of arms

- Location within Austria
- Coordinates: 48°39′N 16°54′E
- Country: Austria
- State: Lower Austria
- District: Mistelbach

Government
  - Mayor: Wolfram Erasim (SPÖ)

Area
  - Total: 20.05 km^{2} (7.74 sq mi)
- Elevation: 168 m (551 ft)

Population (2018-01-01)
  - Total: 1,100
  - Density: 55/km^{2} (140/sq mi)
- Time zone: UTC+1 (CET)
  - Summer (DST): UTC+2 (CEST)
- Postal code: 2274
- Area code: 02535
- Website: www.rabensburg.at

Rabensburg is a town in the district of Mistelbach in the Austrian state of Lower Austria.

== Population ==
Historical population
Year	Pop.	±%
1971	1,503	—
1981	1,273	−15.3%
1991	1,140	−10.4%
2001	1,102	−3.3%
