= Unterstinkenbrunn =

- Municipality
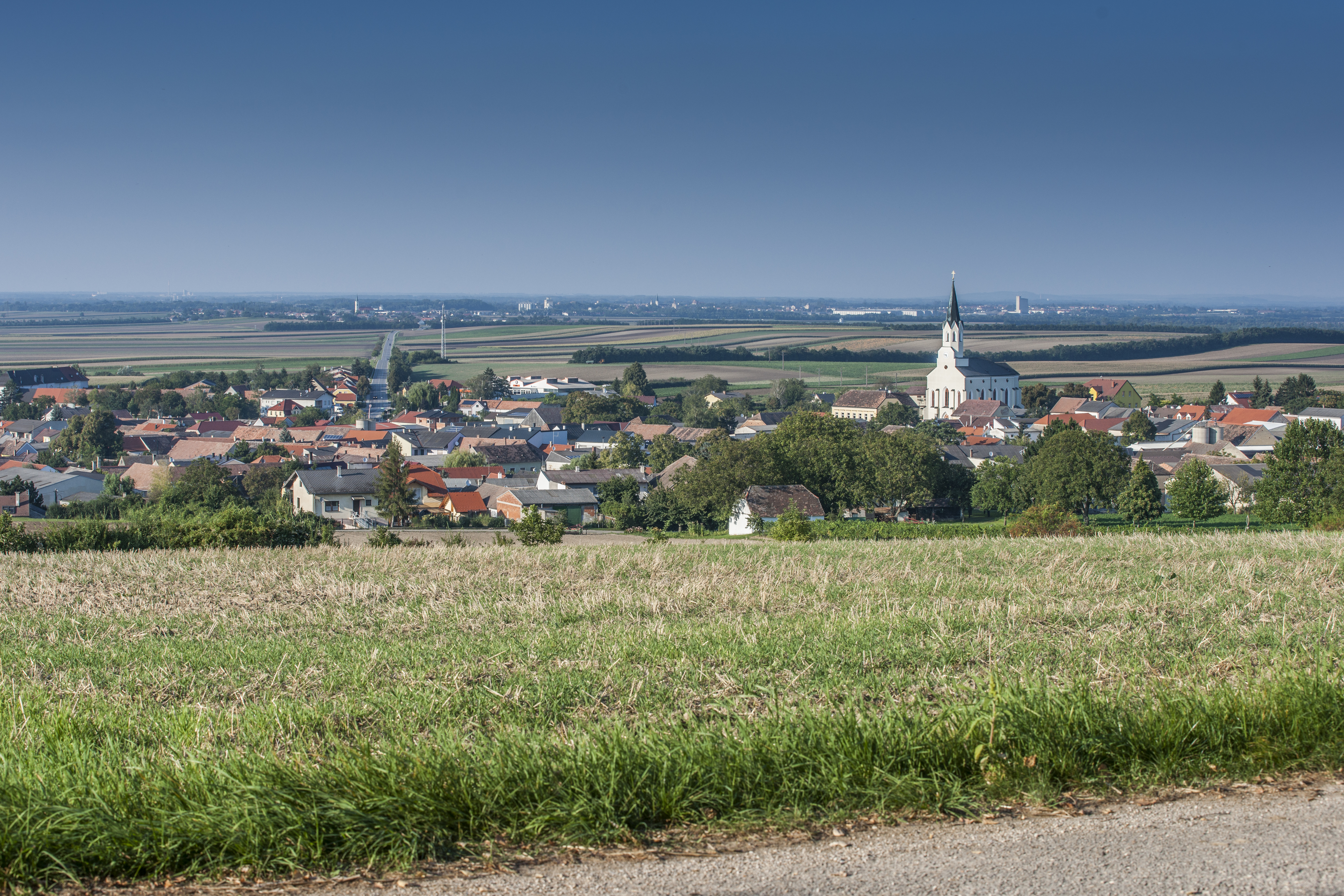

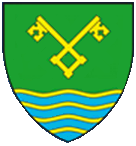
- Coat of arms

- Location within Austria
- Coordinates: 48°40′N 16°21′E
- Country: Austria
- State: Lower Austria
- District: Mistelbach

Government
  - Mayor: Matthias Hartmann Jun.

Area
  - Total: 9.42 km^{2} (3.64 sq mi)
- Elevation: 207 m (679 ft)

Population (2018-01-01)
  - Total: 560
  - Density: 59/km^{2} (150/sq mi)
- Time zone: UTC+1 (CET)
  - Summer (DST): UTC+2 (CEST)
- Postal code: 2154
- Area code: 02526
- Website: www.unterstinkenbrunn.gv.at

Unterstinkenbrunn is a town in the district of Mistelbach in the Austrian state of Lower Austria.

== Geography ==
The water from the Stinkebrunnen well, from which the village takes its name, is enriched with ferrous iron salts from the clay and sand soil, which oxidises to ferric iron upon contact with atmospheric oxygen, giving the water an inky taste, sulfurous smell, and the wellhead an extensive layer of red dust.

== Population ==
Historical population
Year	Pop.	±%
1971	689	—
1981	637	−7.5%
1991	593	−6.9%
2001	598	+0.8%

== Trivia ==
- Unterstinkenbrunn was the hometown of the violinist Johann Hummel (31 May 1754, Unterstinkenbrunn–20 Dec. 1828, Jena), the father of the composer Johann Nepomuk Hummel.
- Unterstinkenbrunn was mentioned in the song "Lach-Jodler" by Franzl Lang
