= Gottfried von Preyer =

Austrian composer, conductor and teacher

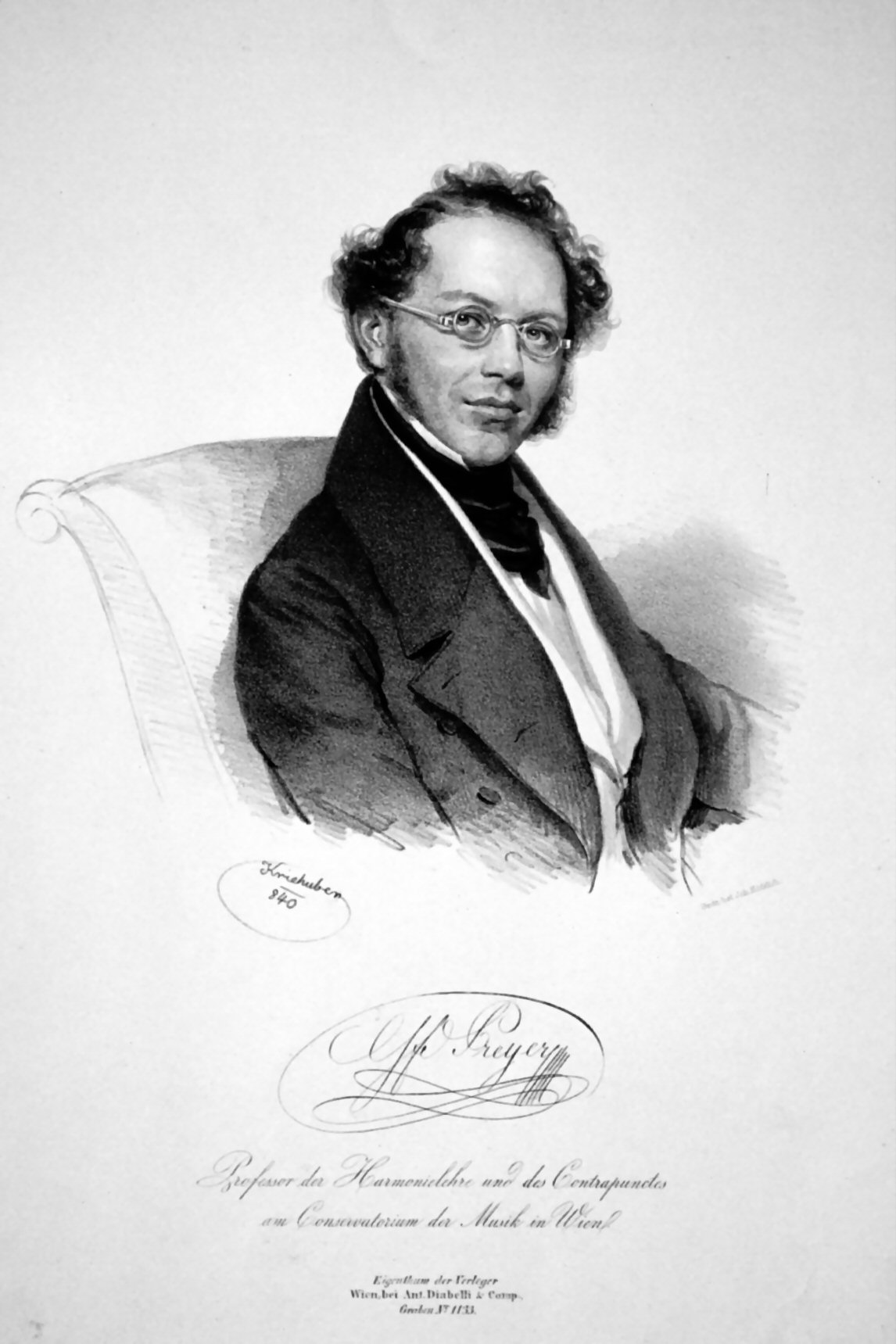
Gottfried Preyer, 1840.

Gottfried von Preyer (15 March 1807 – 9 May 1901) was an Austrian composer, conductor and teacher.

== Biography ==
Preyer was born in Hausbrunn and studied with Simon Sechter from 1828 to 1834. He became professor of harmony and composition at the Vienna Conservatory in 1839, and from 1844 to 1849 he was director of the conservatory. He was organist of St. Stephen's Cathedral in Vienna for 57 years.

He founded children's hospital Gottfried von Preyer'sches Kinderspital bearing his name.

He died in Vienna, aged 94. Preyer attributed his long career to his teetotalism and vegetarian diet.

== Works ==
Preyer composed over 600 pieces of sacred and secular music, only a few of which were printed: 4 requiems, 5 Te Deums, around 25 masses, hymns and responsories, organ works, symphonies, string quartets and songs. The oratorio Noah and the operas Walladmor, Die Freymannshöhle and Amaranth are well known. His compositions of sacred music are still part of the standard repertoire of church music today

== Note ==
- Biography (in German)
- German Wikipedia article
- Biographical information
