= Kreuzstetten =

- Municipality
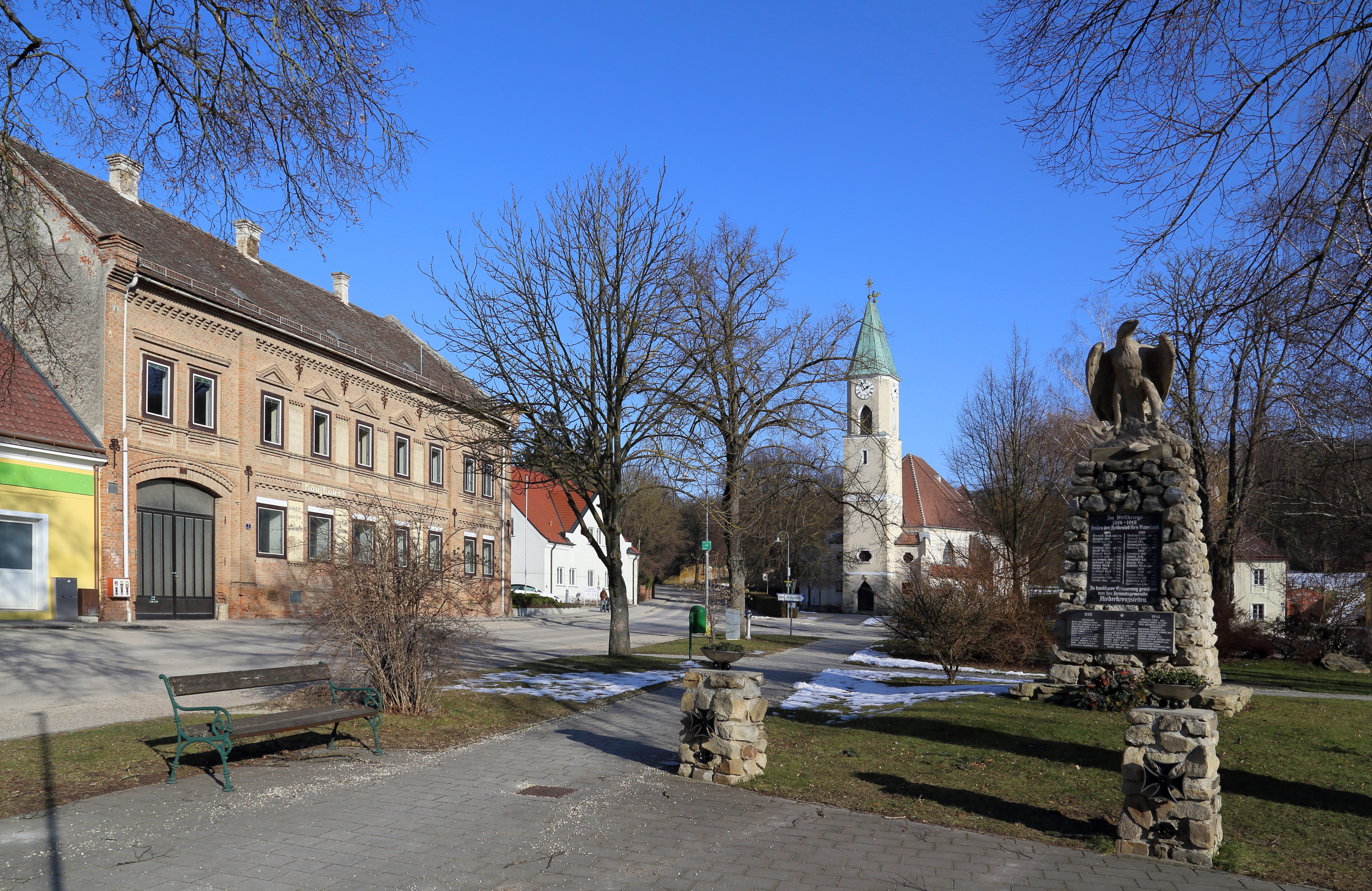
- Center of Niederkreuzstetten

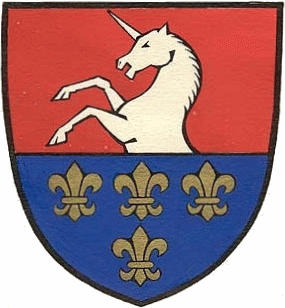
- Coat of arms

- Location within Austria
- Coordinates: 48°28′N 16°28′E
- Country: Austria
- State: Lower Austria
- District: Mistelbach

Government
  - Mayor: Adolf Viktorik (SPÖ)

Area
  - Total: 24.33 km^{2} (9.39 sq mi)
- Elevation: 224 m (735 ft)

Population (2018-01-01)
  - Total: 1,541
  - Density: 63.34/km^{2} (164.0/sq mi)
- Time zone: UTC+1 (CET)
  - Summer (DST): UTC+2 (CEST)
- Postal code: 2124
- Area code: 02263
- Website: www.kreuzstetten.at

Kreuzstetten is a town in the district of Mistelbach in the Austrian state of Lower Austria.

== Population ==
Historical population
Year	Pop.	±%
1971	1,203	—
1981	1,159	−3.7%
1991	1,353	+16.7%
2001	1,499	+10.8%
2011	1,510	+0.7%
2021	1,572	+4.1%

== Notable people ==
- Anna Kiesenhofer, Austrian cyclist, Olympic champion
