= Großkrut =

- Municipality
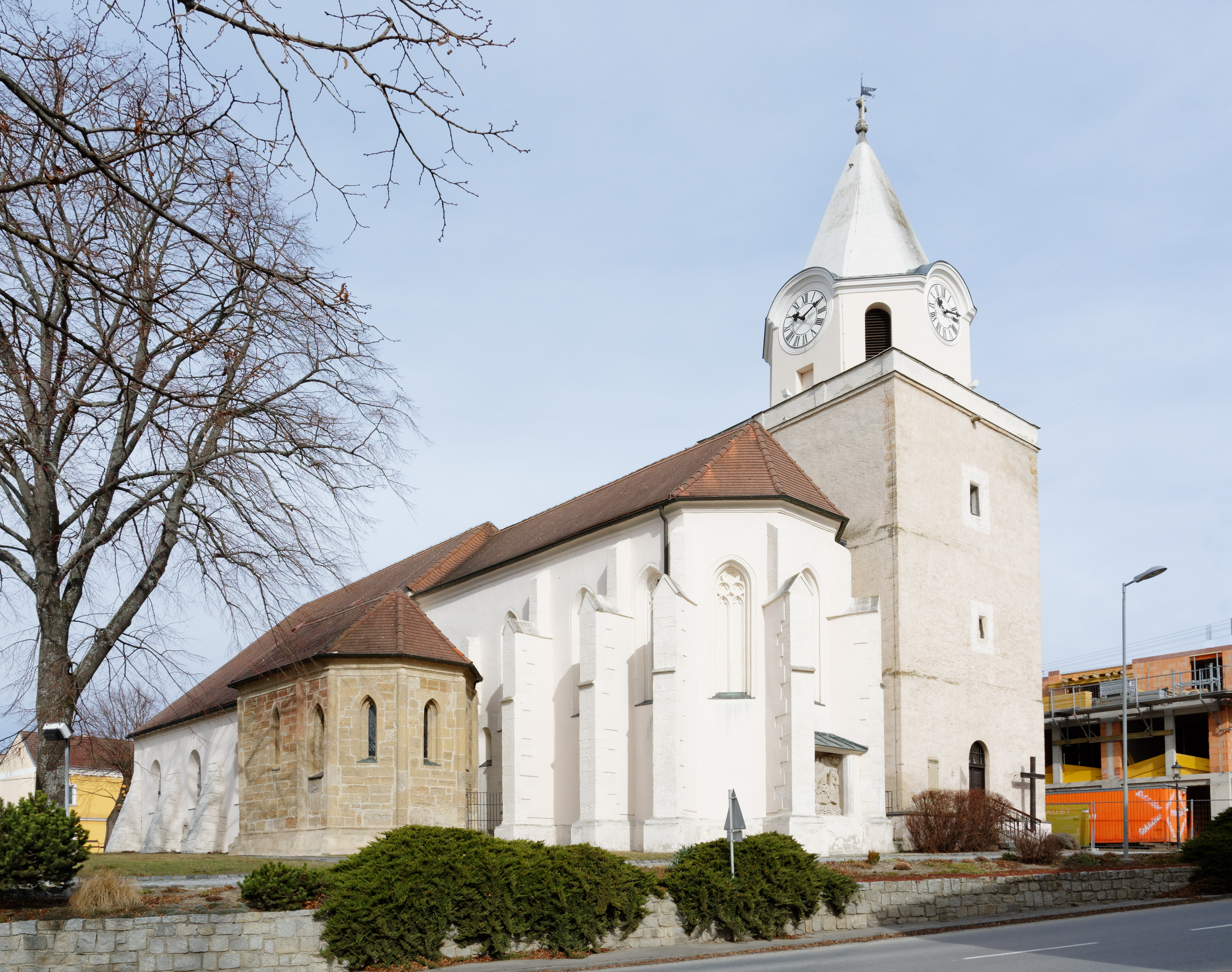
- Church of Saint Stephen

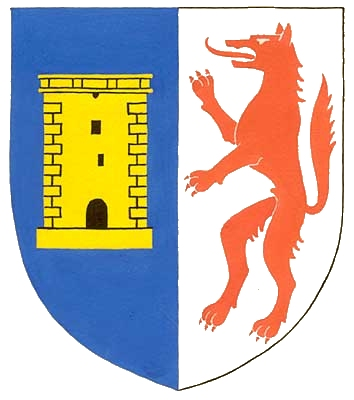
- Coat of arms

- Location within Austria
- Coordinates: 48°39′N 16°43′E
- Country: Austria
- State: Lower Austria
- District: Mistelbach

Government
  - Mayor: Franz Wagner (ÖVP)

Area
  - Total: 38.45 km^{2} (14.85 sq mi)
- Elevation: 181 m (594 ft)

Population (2018-01-01)
  - Total: 1,572
  - Density: 40.88/km^{2} (105.9/sq mi)
- Time zone: UTC+1 (CET)
  - Summer (DST): UTC+2 (CEST)
- Postal code: 2143
- Area code: 02556
- Website: www.grosskrut.at

Großkrut is a town in the district of Mistelbach in the Austrian state of Lower Austria.

== Population ==
Historical population
Year	Pop.	±%
1971	1,998	—
1981	1,780	−10.9%
1991	1,697	−4.7%
2001	1,643	−3.2%
2011	1,561	−5.0%
2021	1,640	+5.1%
