= Großharras =

- Municipality
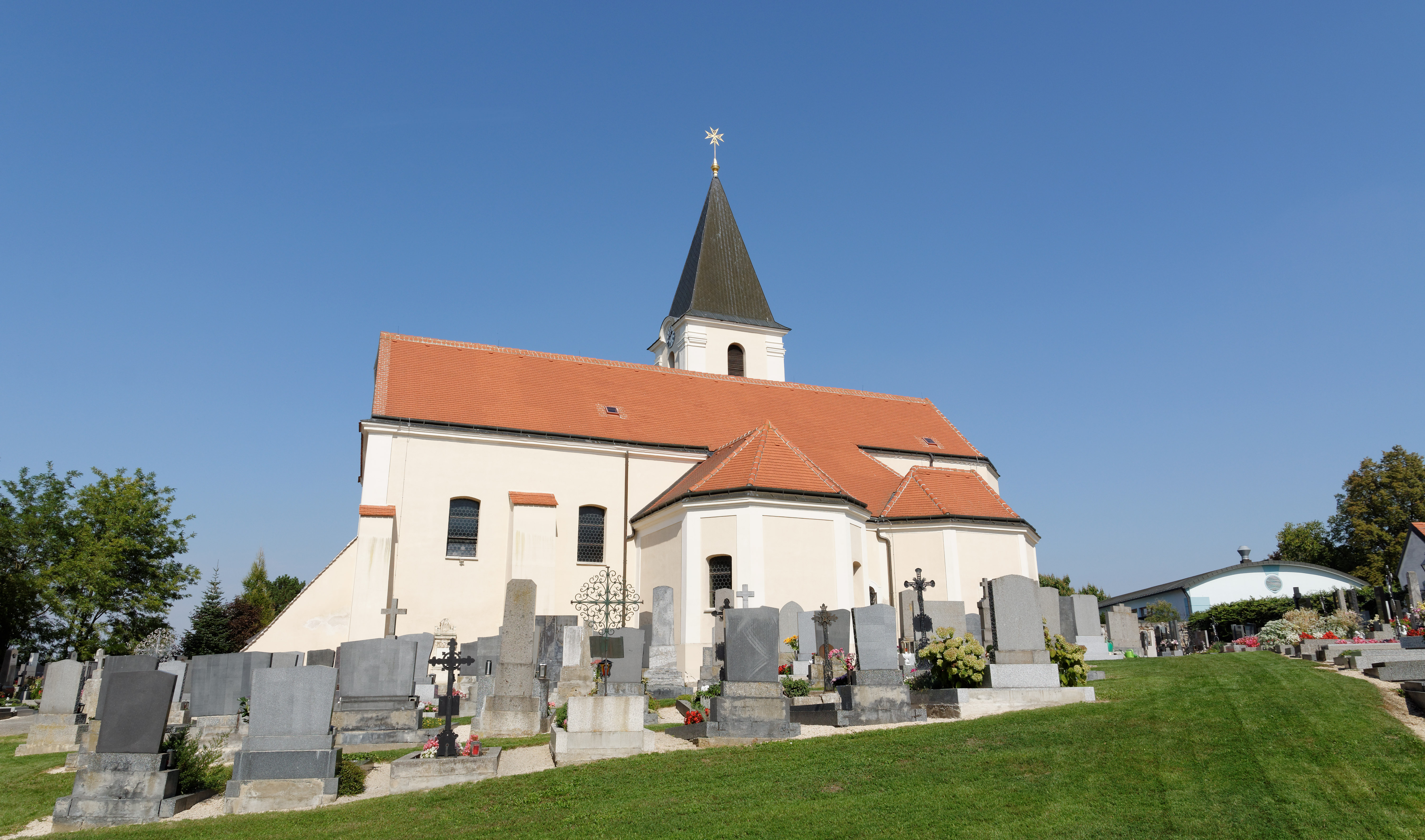
- Großharras parish church

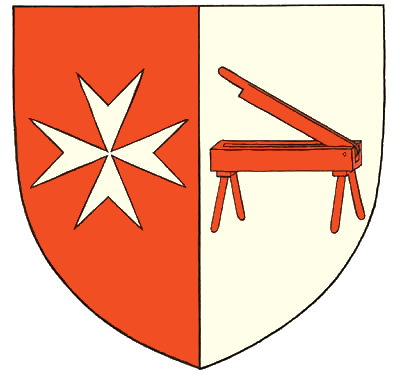
- Coat of arms

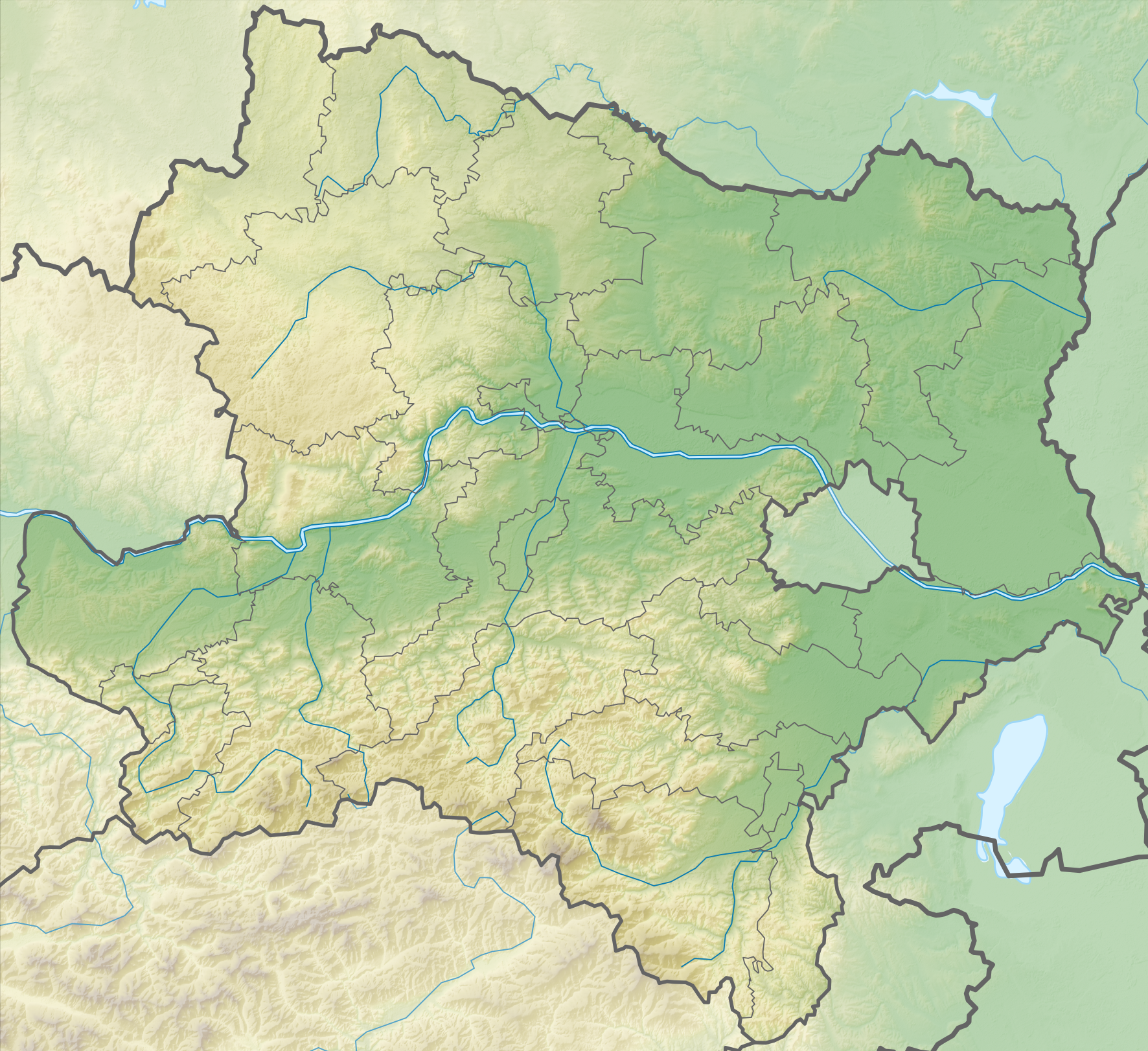
- Location within Lower Austria Location within Austria
- Coordinates: 48°40′N 16°15′E
- Country: Austria
- State: Lower Austria
- District: Mistelbach

Government
  - Mayor: Josef Kindler

Area
  - Total: 42.66 km^{2} (16.47 sq mi)
- Elevation: 206 m (676 ft)

Population (2018-01-01)
  - Total: 1,116
  - Density: 26.16/km^{2} (67.75/sq mi)
- Time zone: UTC+1 (CET)
  - Summer (DST): UTC+2 (CEST)
- Postal code: 2034
- Area code: 02526

Großharras is a town in the district of Mistelbach in the Austrian state of Lower Austria.

== Geography ==
The area comprises the cadastral communities of Diepolz, Großharras and Zwingendorf.

== Population ==
Historical population
Year	Pop.	±%
1971	1,602	—
1981	1,391	−13.2%
1991	1,319	−5.2%
2001	1,202	−8.9%
