= Gaubitsch =

- Municipality
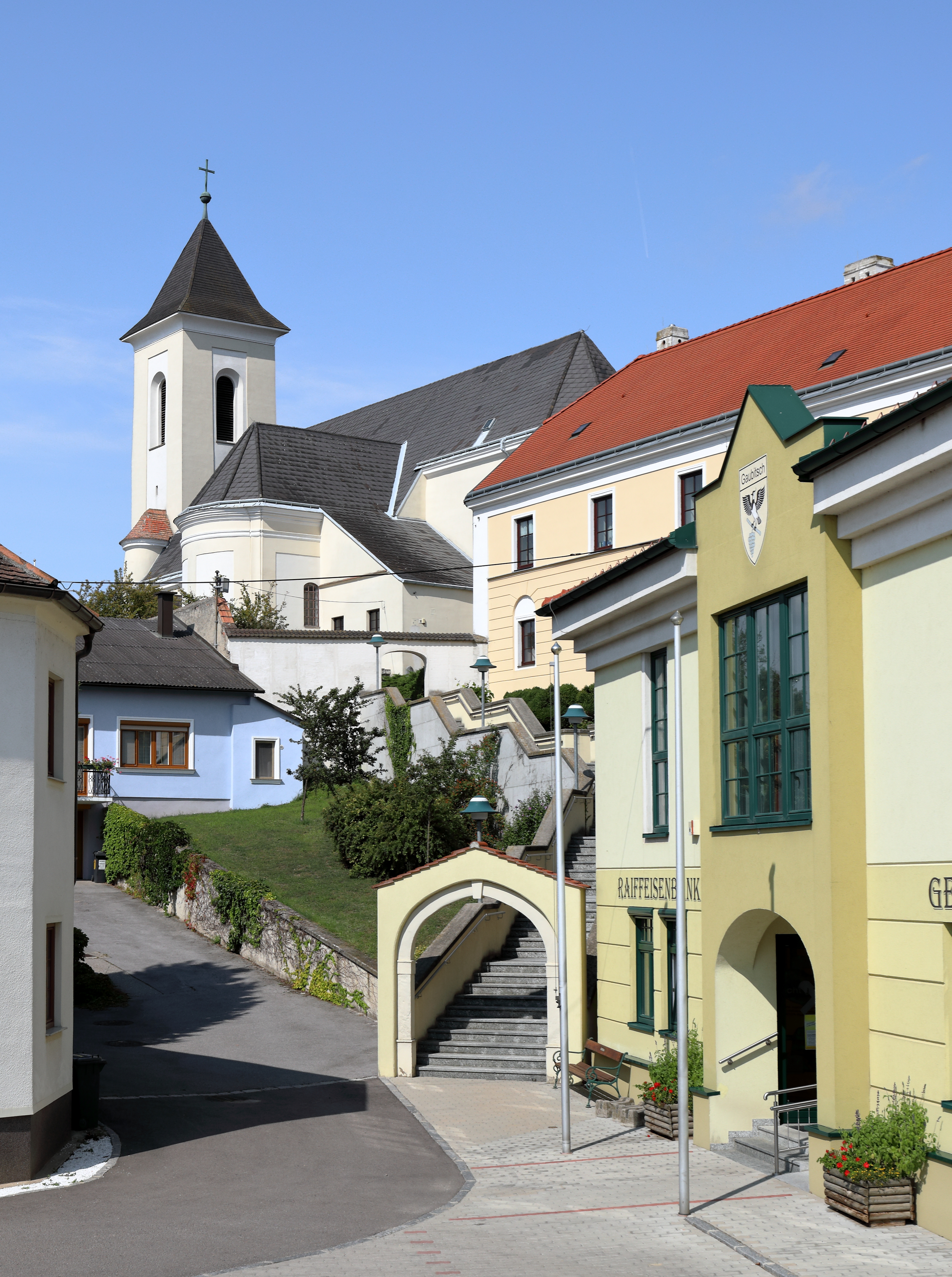
- Town centre with parish church

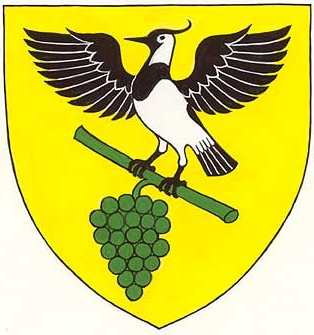
- Coat of arms

- Location within Austria
- Coordinates: 48°39′N 16°23′E
- Country: Austria
- State: Lower Austria
- District: Mistelbach

Government
  - Mayor: Franz Popp

Area
  - Total: 22.48 km^{2} (8.68 sq mi)
- Elevation: 229 m (751 ft)

Population (2018-01-01)
  - Total: 894
  - Density: 39.8/km^{2} (103/sq mi)
- Time zone: UTC+1 (CET)
  - Summer (DST): UTC+2 (CEST)
- Postal code: 2154
- Area code: 02522
- Website: www.gaubitsch.at

Gaubitsch is a town in the district of Mistelbach in the Austrian state of Lower Austria.

The municipality of Gaubitsch is divided into these subdivisions:

- Altenmarkt
- Gaubitsch
- Kleinbaumgarten

== History ==
In late April 1945, German 8th Army (Hans Kreysing) had its headquarters at Gaubitsch.

== Population ==
Historical population
Year	Pop.	±%
1971	911	—
1981	873	−4.2%
1991	884	+1.3%
2001	937	+6.0%
