= Hochleithen =

- Municipality
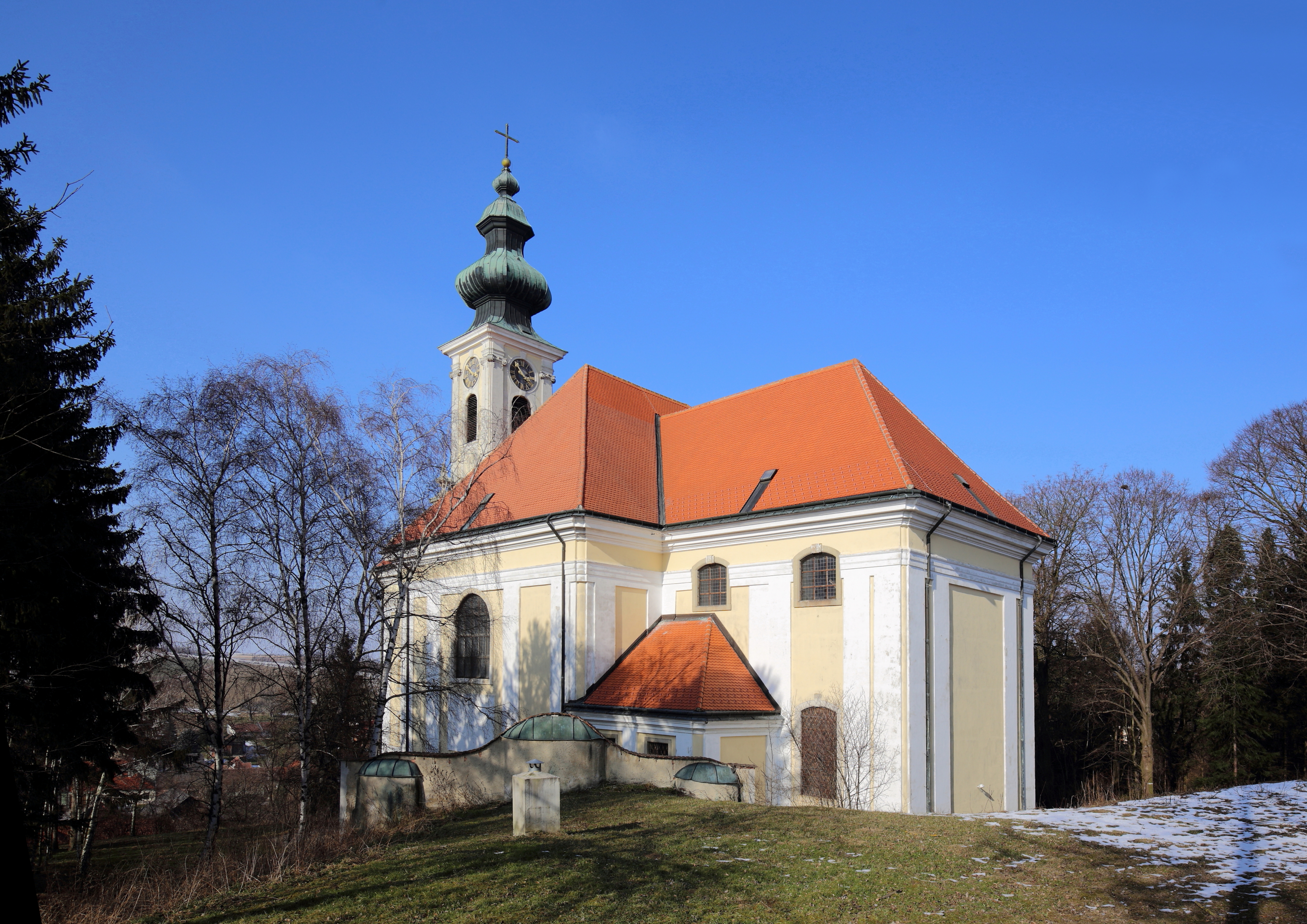
- Wolfpassing an der Hochleithen parish church

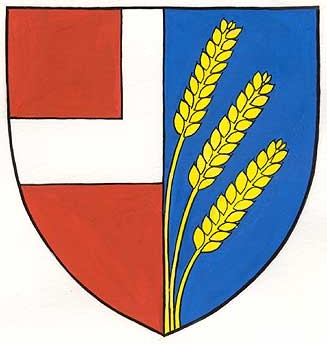
- Coat of arms

- Location within Austria
- Coordinates: 48°27′N 16°31′E
- Country: Austria
- State: Lower Austria
- District: Mistelbach

Government
  - Mayor: Adolf Mechtler

Area
  - Total: 19.91 km^{2} (7.69 sq mi)
- Elevation: 226 m (741 ft)

Population (2018-01-01)
  - Total: 1,166
  - Density: 58.56/km^{2} (151.7/sq mi)
- Time zone: UTC+1 (CET)
  - Summer (DST): UTC+2 (CEST)
- Postal code: 2123, but Bogenneusiedl 2125
- Area code: 02245
- Website: www.hochleithen.at

Hochleithen is a municipality in the district of Mistelbach in the Austrian state of Lower Austria. It constist of three different villages: Traunfeld, Wolfpassing and der Hochleithen and Bogenneusiedl.

== Population ==
Historical population
Year	Pop.	±%
1971	1,014	—
1981	1,014	+0.0%
1991	1,026	+1.2%
2001	1,084	+5.7%
