= Ulrichskirchen-Schleinbach =

- Municipality
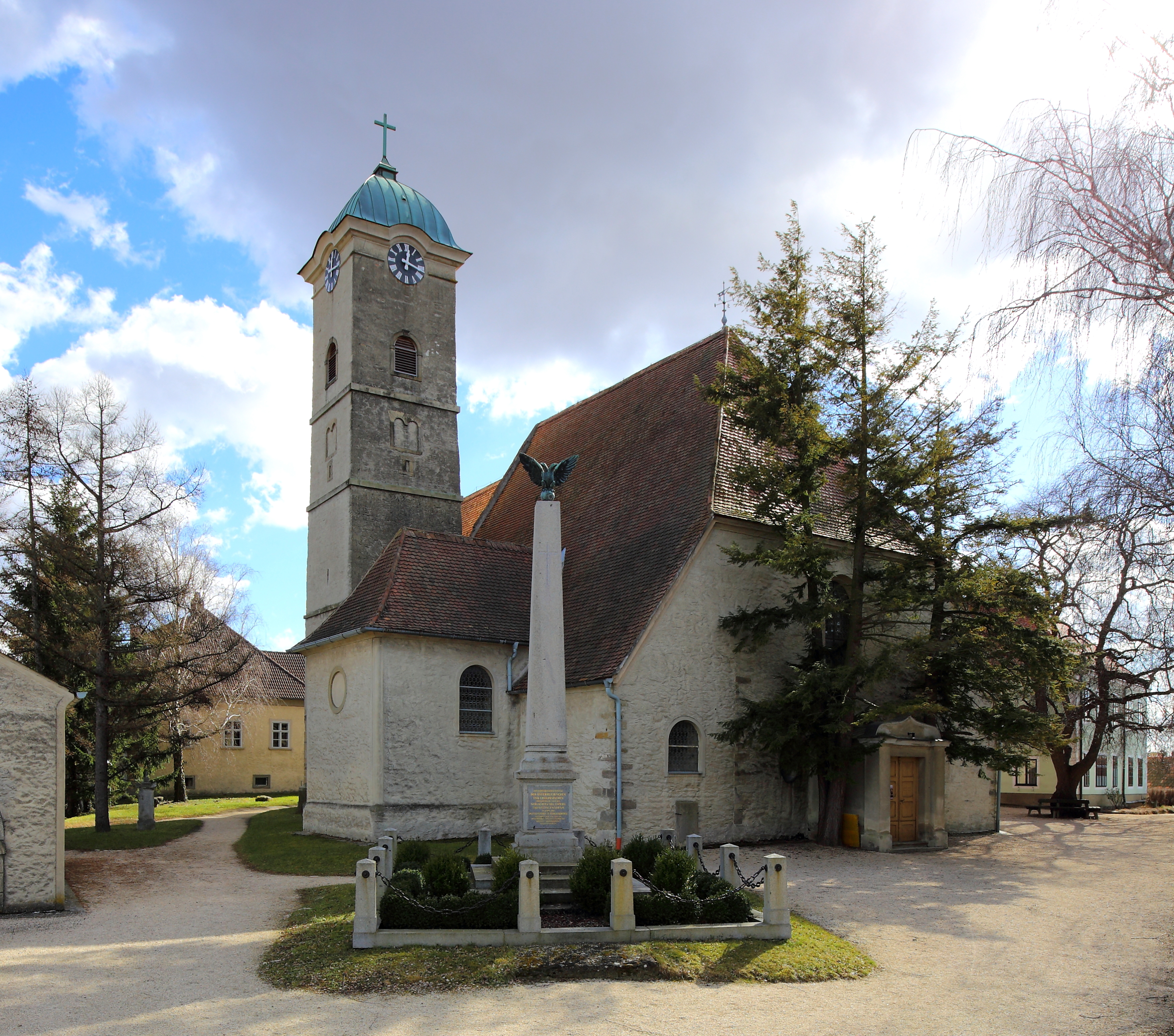
- Ulrichskirchen parich church

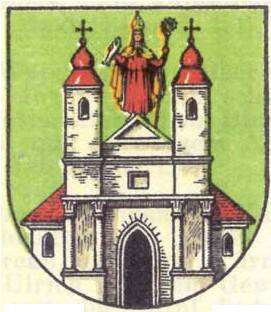
- Coat of arms

- Location within Austria
- Coordinates: 48°24′N 16°29′E
- Country: Austria
- State: Lower Austria
- District: Mistelbach

Government
  - Mayor: Ernst Bauer

Area
  - Total: 26.52 km^{2} (10.24 sq mi)
- Elevation: 192 m (630 ft)

Population (2018-01-01)
  - Total: 2,630
  - Density: 99.2/km^{2} (257/sq mi)
- Time zone: UTC+1 (CET)
  - Summer (DST): UTC+2 (CEST)
- Postal code: 2122
- Area code: 02245
- Website: www.ulrichskirchen-schleinbach.gv.at

Ulrichskirchen-Schleinbach is a town in the district of Mistelbach in the Austrian state of Lower Austria.

== Population ==
Historical population
Year	Pop.	±%
1971	2,033	—
1981	2,084	+2.5%
1991	2,253	+8.1%
2001	2,329	+3.4%
