= Mistelbach District =

Coordinates: 48.644°N 16.502°E

Mistelbach District Bezirk Mistelbach
- District
- Country: Austria
- State: Lower Austria
- Number of municipalities: 36
- Administrative seat: Mistelbach

Government
  - District Governor: Gerlinde Draxler (since 2018)

Area
  - Total: 1,291.3 km^{2} (498.6 sq mi)

Population (2024)
  - Total: 77,120
  - Density: 59.72/km^{2} (154.7/sq mi)
- Time zone: UTC+01:00 (CET)
  - Summer (DST): UTC+02:00 (CEST)
- Vehicle registration: MI
- NUTS code: AT125
- District code: 316

Bezirk Mistelbach is a district of the state of Lower Austria in Austria.

== Municipalities ==
Suburbs, hamlets and other subdivisions of a municipality are indicated in small characters.

- Altlichtenwarth
- Asparn an der Zaya
  - Altmanns, Michelstetten, Olgersdorf, Schletz
- Bernhardsthal
  - Bernhardsthal, Katzelsdorf, Reintal
- Bockfließ
- Drasenhofen
  - Drasenhofen, Fünfkirchen, Kleinschweinbarth, Steinebrunn, Stützenhofen
- Falkenstein
- Fallbach
  - Fallbach, Friebritz, Hagenberg, Hagendorf, Loosdorf
- Gaubitsch
  - Altenmarkt, Gaubitsch, Kleinbaumgarten
- Gaweinstal
  - Atzelsdorf, Gaweinstal, Höbersbrunn, Martinsdorf, Pellendorf, Schrick
- Gnadendorf
  - Eichenbrunn, Gnadendorf, Oedenkirchenwald, Pyhra, Röhrabrunn, Wenzersdorf, Zwentendorf
- Groß-Engersdorf
- Großebersdorf
  - Eibesbrunn, Großebersdorf, Manhartsbrunn, Putzing
- Großharras
  - Diepolz, Großharras, Zwingendorf
- Großkrut
  - Althöflein, Ginzersdorf, Großkrut, Harrersdorf
- Hausbrunn
- Herrnbaumgarten
- Hochleithen
  - Bogenneusiedl, Traunfeld, Wolfpassing an der Hochleithen
- Kreuttal
  - Hautzendorf, Hornsburg, Ritzendorf, Unterolberndorf
- Kreuzstetten
  - Niederkreuzstetten, Oberkreuzstetten, Streifing
- Laa an der Thaya
  - Hanfthal, Kottingneusiedl, Laa an der Thaya, Ruhhof, Ungerndorf, Wulzeshofen
- Ladendorf
  - Eggersdorf, Garmanns, Grafensulz, Herrnleis, Ladendorf, Neubau, Pürstendorf
- Mistelbach an der Zaya
  - Ebendorf, Eibesthal, Frättingsdorf, Hörersdorf, Hüttendorf, Kettlasbrunn, Lanzendorf, Mistelbach, Paasdorf, Siebenhirten
- Neudorf bei Staatz
  - Kirchstetten, Neudorf bei Staatz, Rothenseehof, Zlabern
- Niederleis
  - Helfens, Kleinsitzendorf, Niederleis, Nodendorf
- Ottenthal
  - Guttenbrunn, Ottenthal
- Pillichsdorf
- Poysdorf
  - Altruppersdorf, Erdberg, Föllim, Ketzelsdorf, Kleinhadersdorf, Poysbrunn, Poysdorf, Walterskirchen, Wetzelsdorf, Wilhelmsdorf
- Rabensburg
- Schrattenberg
- Staatz
  - Ameis, Enzersdorf bei Staatz, Ernsdorf bei Staatz, Kautendorf, Staatz, Waltersdorf bei Staatz, Wultendorf
- Stronsdorf
  - Oberschoderlee, Patzenthal, Patzmannsdorf, Stronegg, Stronsdorf, Unterschoderlee
- Ulrichskirchen-Schleinbach
  - Kronberg, Schleinbach, Ulrichskirchen
- Unterstinkenbrunn
- Wildendürnbach
  - Alt-Prerau, Neuruppersdorf, Pottenhofen, Wildendürnbach
- Wilfersdorf
  - Bullendorf, Ebersdorf an der Zaya, Hobersdorf, Wilfersdorf
- Wolkersdorf im Weinviertel
  - Münichsthal, Obersdorf, Pfösing, Riedenthal, Wolkersdorf im Weinviertel
