= Ottenthal =

- Municipality
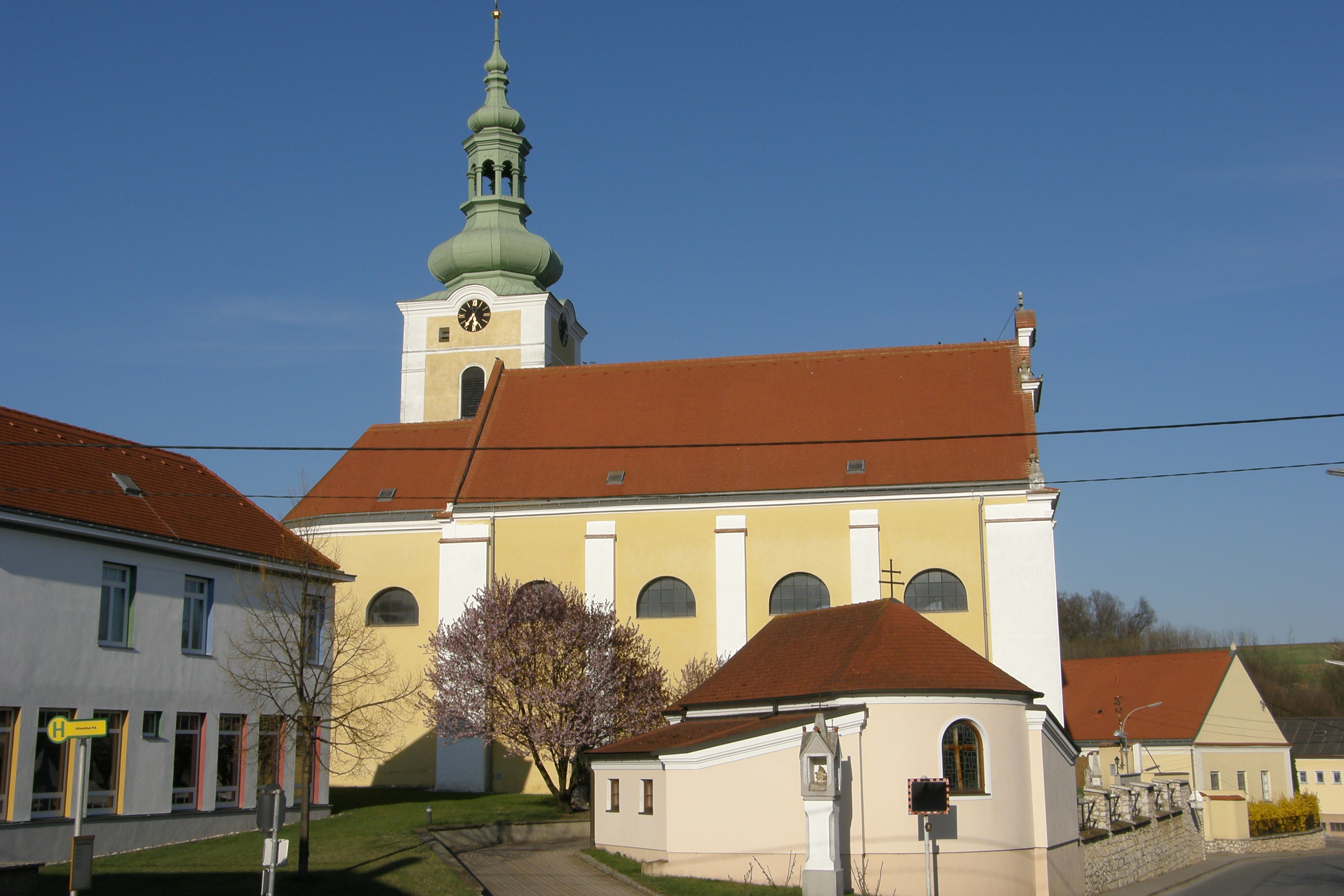
- Ottenthal parish church

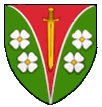
- Coat of arms

- Location within Austria
- Coordinates: 48°46′N 16°35′E
- Country: Austria
- State: Lower Austria
- District: Mistelbach

Government
  - Mayor: Albert Graf

Area
  - Total: 15.39 km^{2} (5.94 sq mi)
- Elevation: 240 m (790 ft)

Population (2018-01-01)
  - Total: 544
  - Density: 35.3/km^{2} (91.5/sq mi)
- Time zone: UTC+1 (CET)
  - Summer (DST): UTC+2 (CEST)
- Postal code: 2163
- Area code: 02554

Ottenthal is a town in the district of Mistelbach in the Austrian state of Lower Austria.

== Population ==
Historical population
Year	Pop.	±%
1971	768	—
1981	679	−11.6%
1991	656	−3.4%
2001	626	−4.6%
