= Kreuttal =

- Municipality
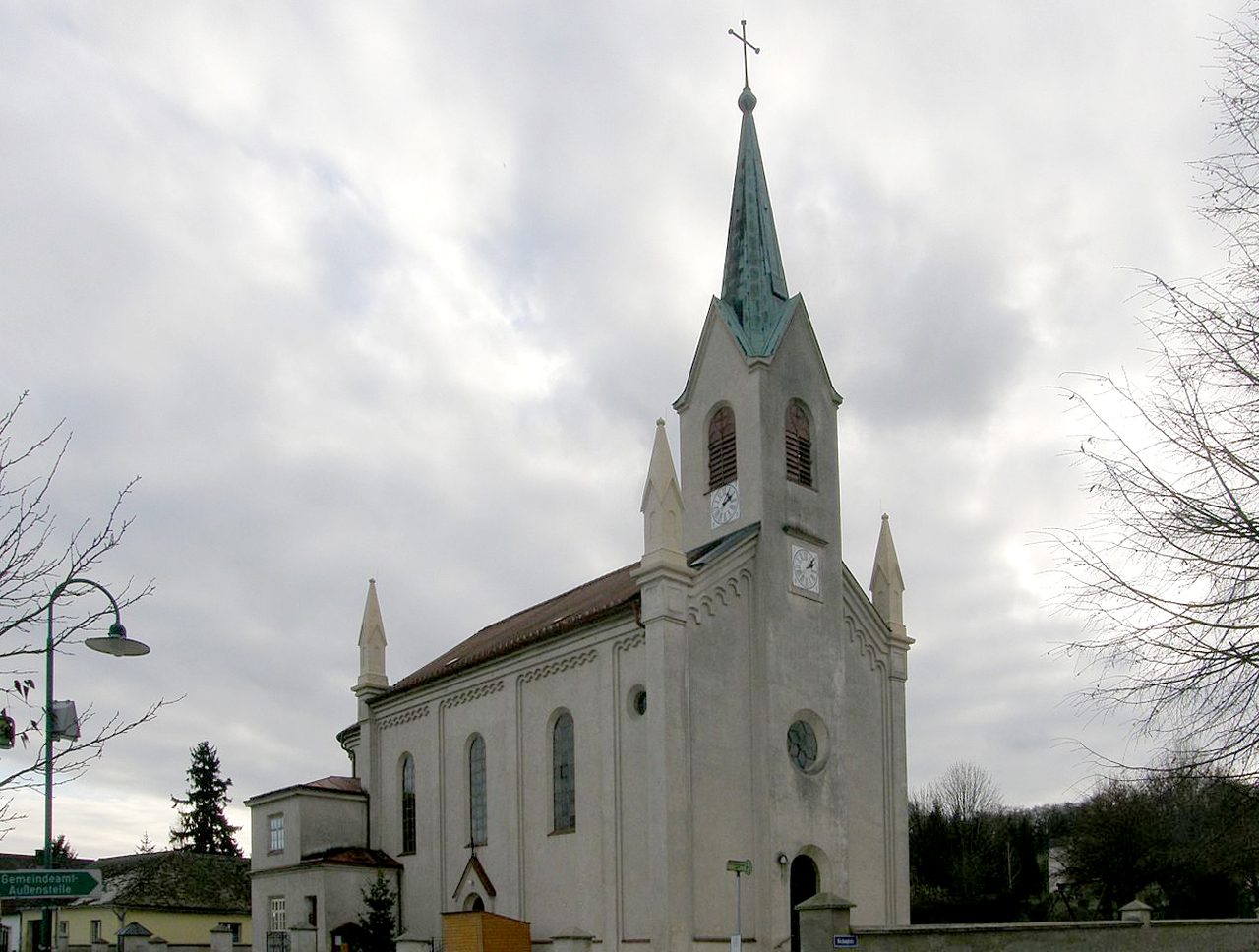
- Unterolberndorf parish church

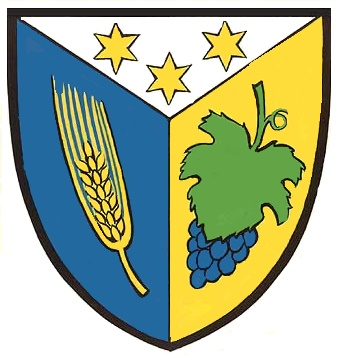
- Coat of arms

- Location within Austria
- Coordinates: 48°26′N 16°29′E
- Country: Austria
- State: Lower Austria
- District: Mistelbach

Government
  - Mayor: Markus Koller (ÖVP)

Area
  - Total: 21.51 km^{2} (8.31 sq mi)
- Elevation: 207 m (679 ft)

Population (2018-01-01)
  - Total: 1,429
  - Density: 66.43/km^{2} (172.1/sq mi)
- Time zone: UTC+1 (CET)
  - Summer (DST): UTC+2 (CEST)
- Postal code: 2123
- Area code: 02245
- Website: www.kreuttal.at

Kreuttal is a town in the district of Mistelbach in the Austrian state of Lower Austria.

The town is split into 4 localities (Ortschaft) (number of inhabitants in parentheses, October 2011): Hautzendorf (540), Hornsburg (183), Ritzendorf (25) and Unterolberndorf (673). The town council has 19 members and is made up of ÖVP (12), SPÖ (4) and the Austrian Green Party (3).

== Population ==
Historical population
Year	Pop.	±%
1971	1,084	—
1981	1,069	−1.4%
1991	1,317	+23.2%
2001	1,308	−0.7%
2011	1,421	+8.6%
2021	1,468	+3.3%
