= Altlichtenwarth =

- Municipality
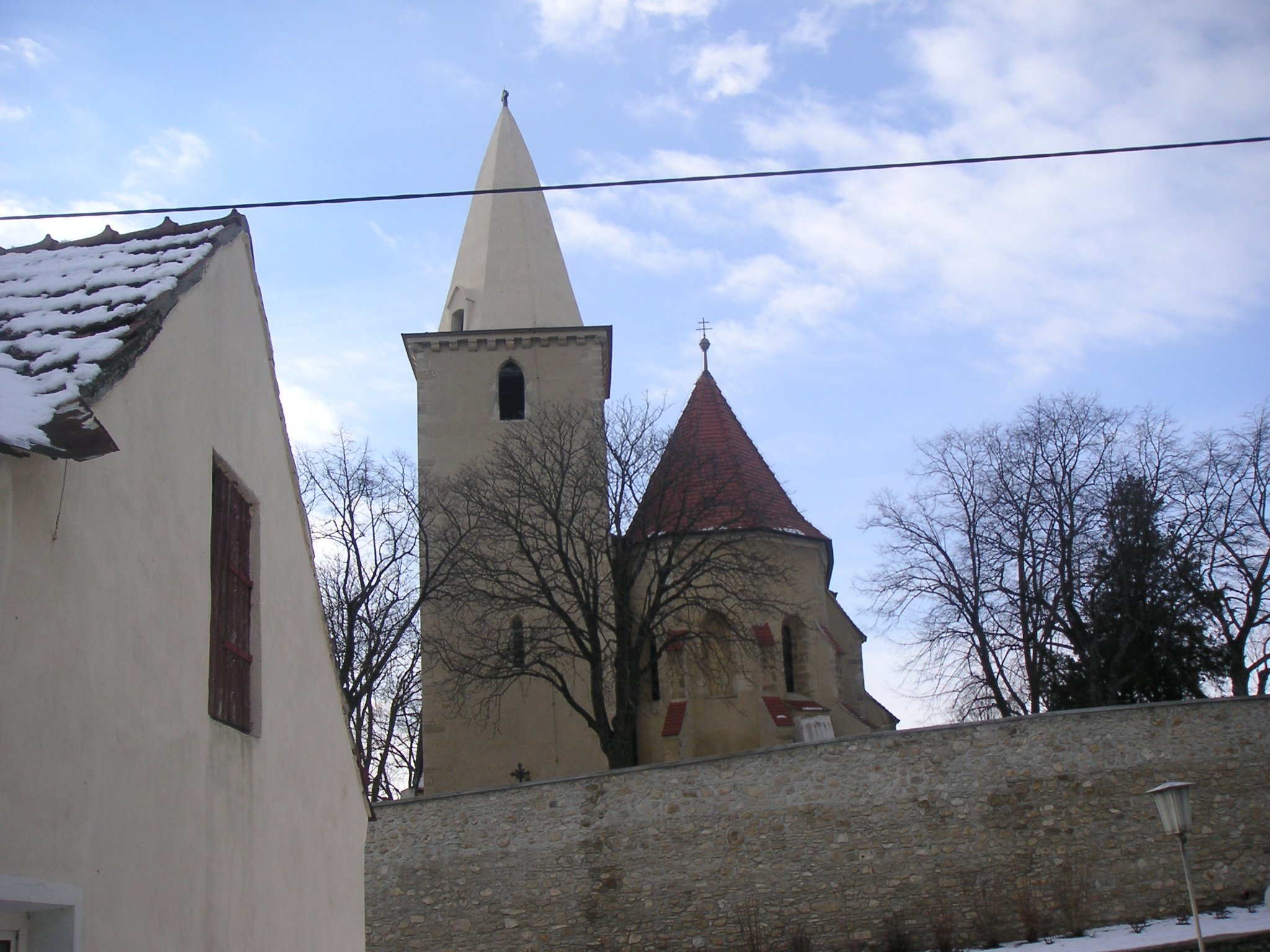

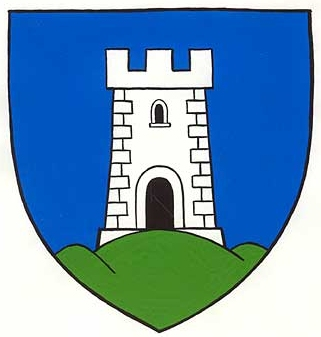
- Coat of arms

- Location within Austria
- Coordinates: 48°39′N 16°48′E
- Country: Austria
- State: Lower Austria
- District: Mistelbach

Government
  - Mayor: Andreas Berger (ÖVP)

Area
  - Total: 20.46 km^{2} (7.90 sq mi)
- Elevation: 783 m (2,569 ft)

Population (2018-01-01)
  - Total: 769
  - Density: 37.6/km^{2} (97.3/sq mi)
- Time zone: UTC+1 (CET)
  - Summer (DST): UTC+2 (CEST)
- Postal code: 2144
- Area code: 02533
- Website: www.altlichtenwarth.at

Altlichtenwarth is a municipality in the district of Mistelbach in the Austrian state of Lower Austria.

== Demographics ==
Historical population
Year	Pop.	±%
1783	726	—
1794	578	−20.4%
1830	882	+52.6%
1846	1,073	+21.7%
1851	1,005	−6.3%
1869	931	−7.4%
1880	1,055	+13.3%
1890	1,196	+13.4%
1900	1,388	+16.1%
1923	1,286	−7.3%
1951	1,393	+8.3%
1961	1,254	−10.0%
1971	1,048	−16.4%
1981	895	−14.6%
1991	808	−9.7%
2001	783	−3.1%
2011	734	−6.3%
2021	750	+2.2%
2025	758	+1.1%

== Politics ==
The municipal council (Gemeinderat) is composed of 15 members and, following the 2025 Lower Austrian local elections, represents the following parties:

- Austrian People's Party (ÖVP): 13 seats
- Social Democratic Party of Austria (SPÖ): 2 seats
- Freedom Party of Austria (FPÖ): 1 seat

The mayor of Altlichtenwarth is Andreas Berger (ÖVP).
