= Bockfließ =

- Municipality
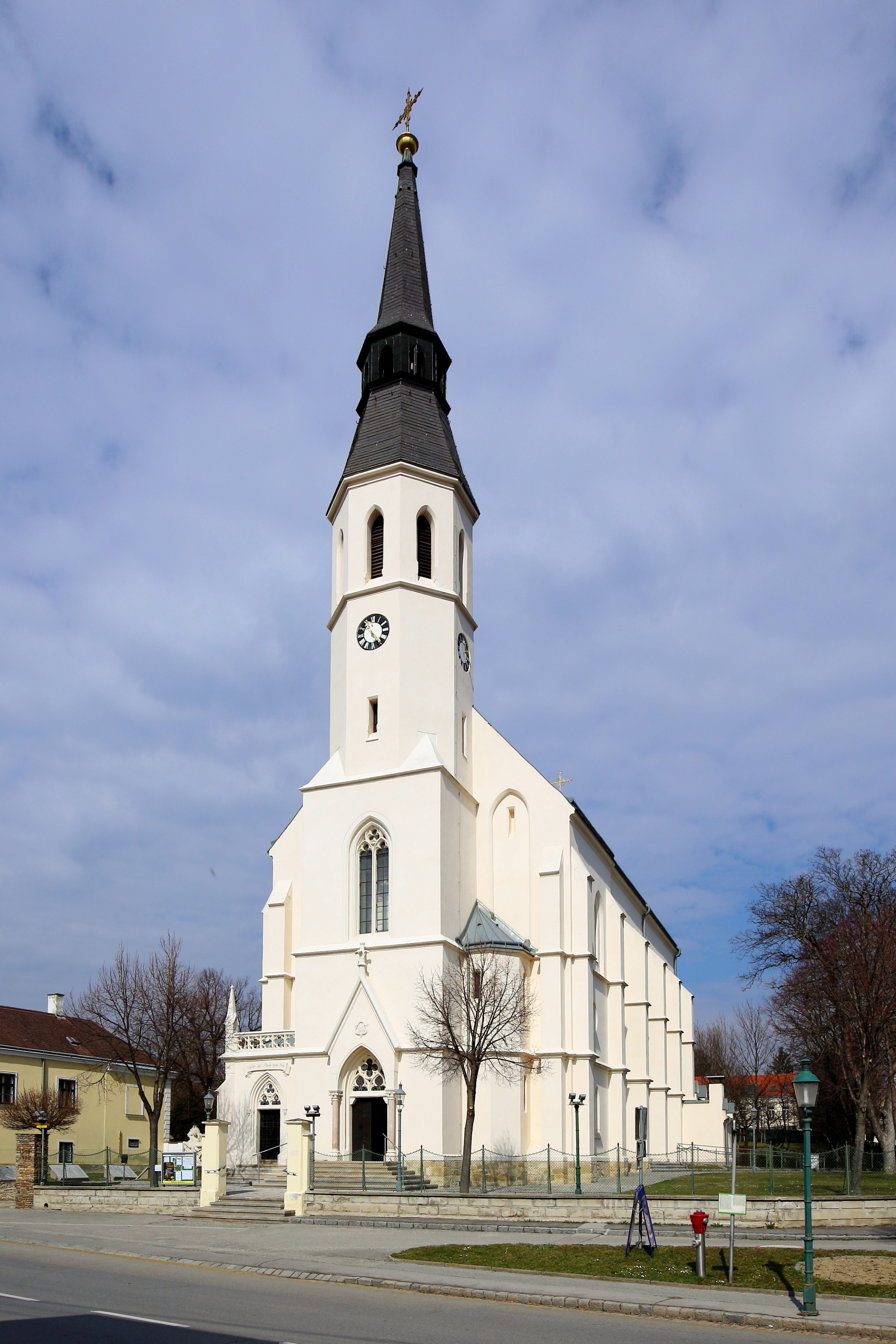

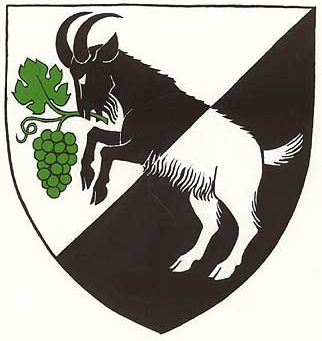
- Coat of arms

- Location within Austria
- Coordinates: 48°21′N 16°36′E
- Country: Austria
- State: Lower Austria
- District: Mistelbach

Government
  - Mayor: Josef Summer

Area
  - Total: 22.87 km^{2} (8.83 sq mi)
- Elevation: 168 m (551 ft)

Population (2018-01-01)
  - Total: 1,348
  - Density: 58.94/km^{2} (152.7/sq mi)
- Time zone: UTC+1 (CET)
  - Summer (DST): UTC+2 (CEST)
- Postal code: 2213
- Area code: 02288
- Website: www.bockfliess.com

Bockfließ is a town in the district of Mistelbach in the Austrian state of Lower Austria.

== Population ==
Historical population
| Year | Pop. | ±% |
|---|---|---|
| 1971 | 1,199 | — |
| 1981 | 1,105 | −7.8% |
| 1991 | 1,245 | +12.7% |
| 2001 | 1,264 | +1.5% |
| 2011 | 1,348 | +6.6% |
| 2021 | 1,328 | −1.5% |
