= Niederleis =

- Municipality
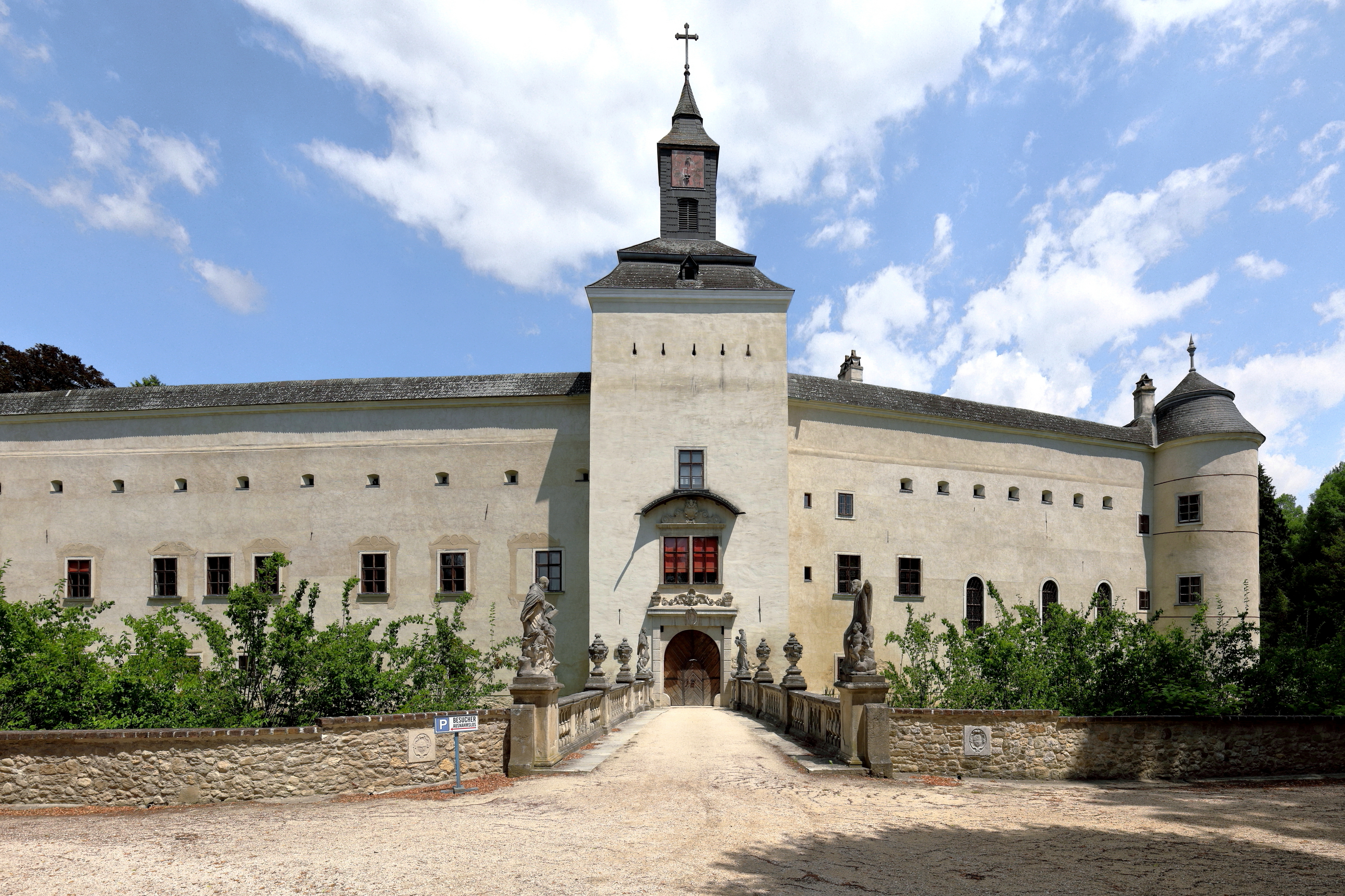
- Niederleis Castle

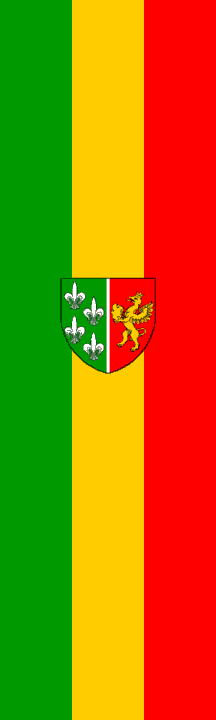
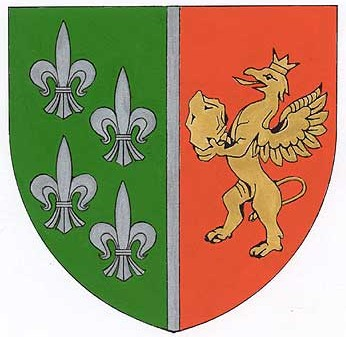
- Flag Coat of arms

- Location within Austria
- Coordinates: 48°33′N 16°24′E
- Country: Austria
- State: Lower Austria
- District: Mistelbach

Government
  - Mayor: Leopold Rötzer (ÖVP)

Area
  - Total: 19.52 km^{2} (7.54 sq mi)
- Elevation: 253 m (830 ft)

Population (2018-01-01)
  - Total: 861
  - Density: 44.1/km^{2} (114/sq mi)
- Time zone: UTC+1 (CET)
  - Summer (DST): UTC+2 (CEST)
- Postal code: 2116
- Area code: 02576
- Website: www.niederleis.at

Niederleis is a town in the district of Mistelbach in the Austrian state of Lower Austria.

== Population ==
Historical population
Year	Pop.	±%
1869	979	—
1890	1,090	+11.3%
1900	1,161	+6.5%
1910	1,178	+1.5%
1923	1,147	−2.6%
1934	1,086	−5.3%
1939	998	−8.1%
1951	944	−5.4%
1961	822	−12.9%
1971	762	−7.3%
1981	665	−12.7%
1991	722	+8.6%
2001	766	+6.1%
2011	838	+9.4%
2021	875	+4.4%
