= Neudorf im Weinviertel =

- Municipality
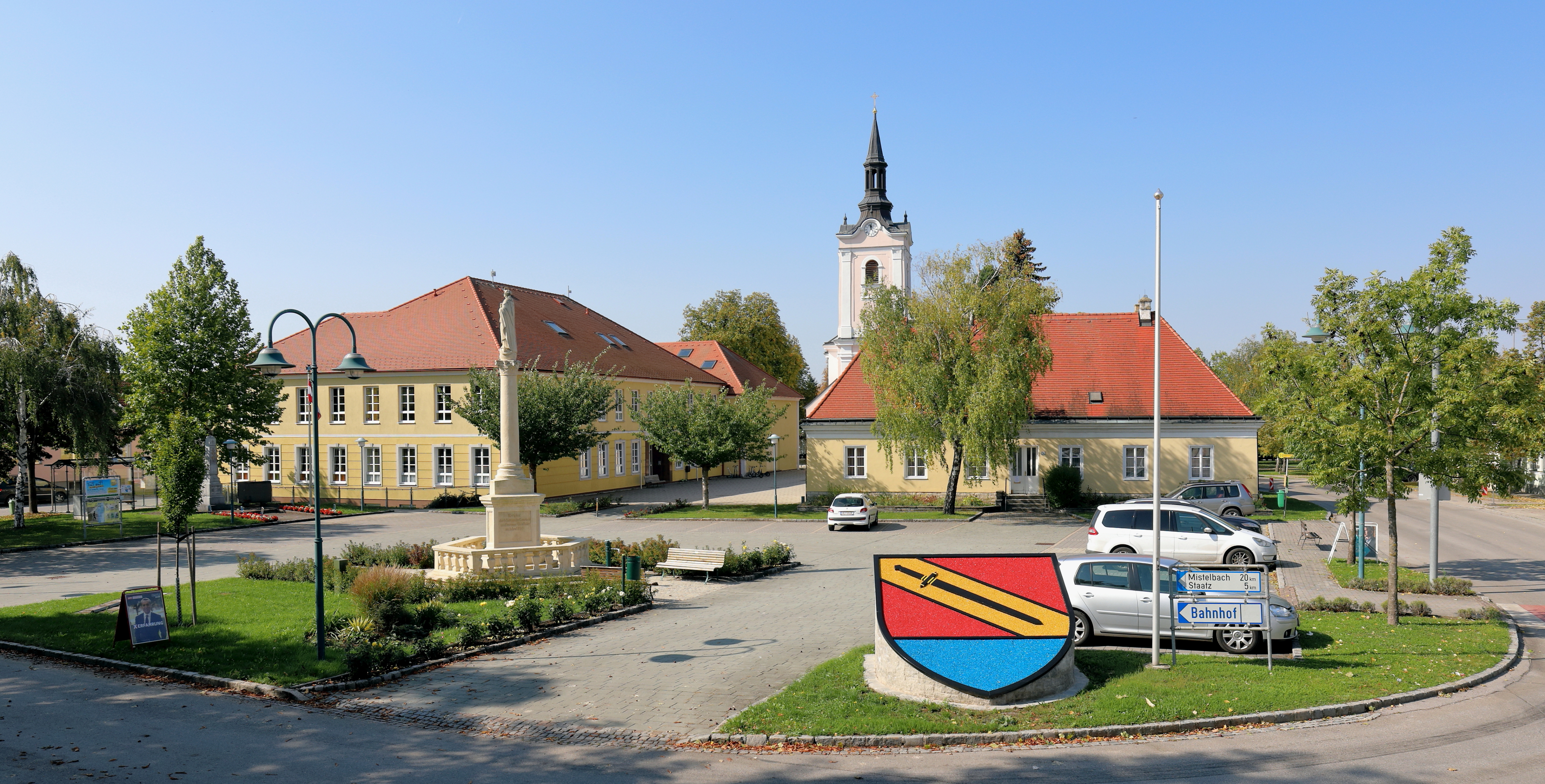

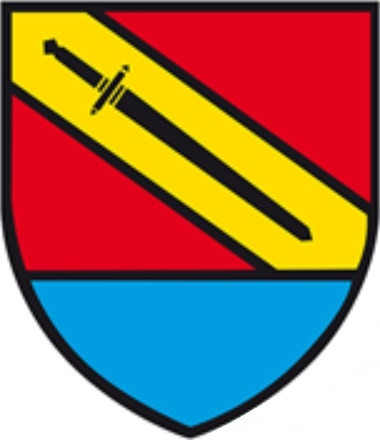
- Coat of arms

- Location within Austria
- Coordinates: 48°43′N 16°29′E
- Country: Austria
- State: Lower Austria
- District: Mistelbach

Government
  - Mayor: Stephan Gartner (ÖVP)

Area
  - Total: 40.14 km^{2} (15.50 sq mi)
- Elevation: 202 m (663 ft)

Population (2018-01-01)
  - Total: 1,430
  - Density: 35.6/km^{2} (92.3/sq mi)
- Time zone: UTC+1 (CET)
  - Summer (DST): UTC+2 (CEST)
- Postal code: 2135
- Area code: 02523
- Website: www.neudorf.co.at

Neudorf im Weinviertel (–2019 Neudorf bei Staatz) is a town in the district of Mistelbach in the Austrian state of Lower Austria.

== Population ==
Historical population
Year	Pop.	±%
1971	1,524	—
1981	1,402	−8.0%
1991	1,286	−8.3%
2001	1,345	+4.6%
