= Hausbrunn =

- Municipality
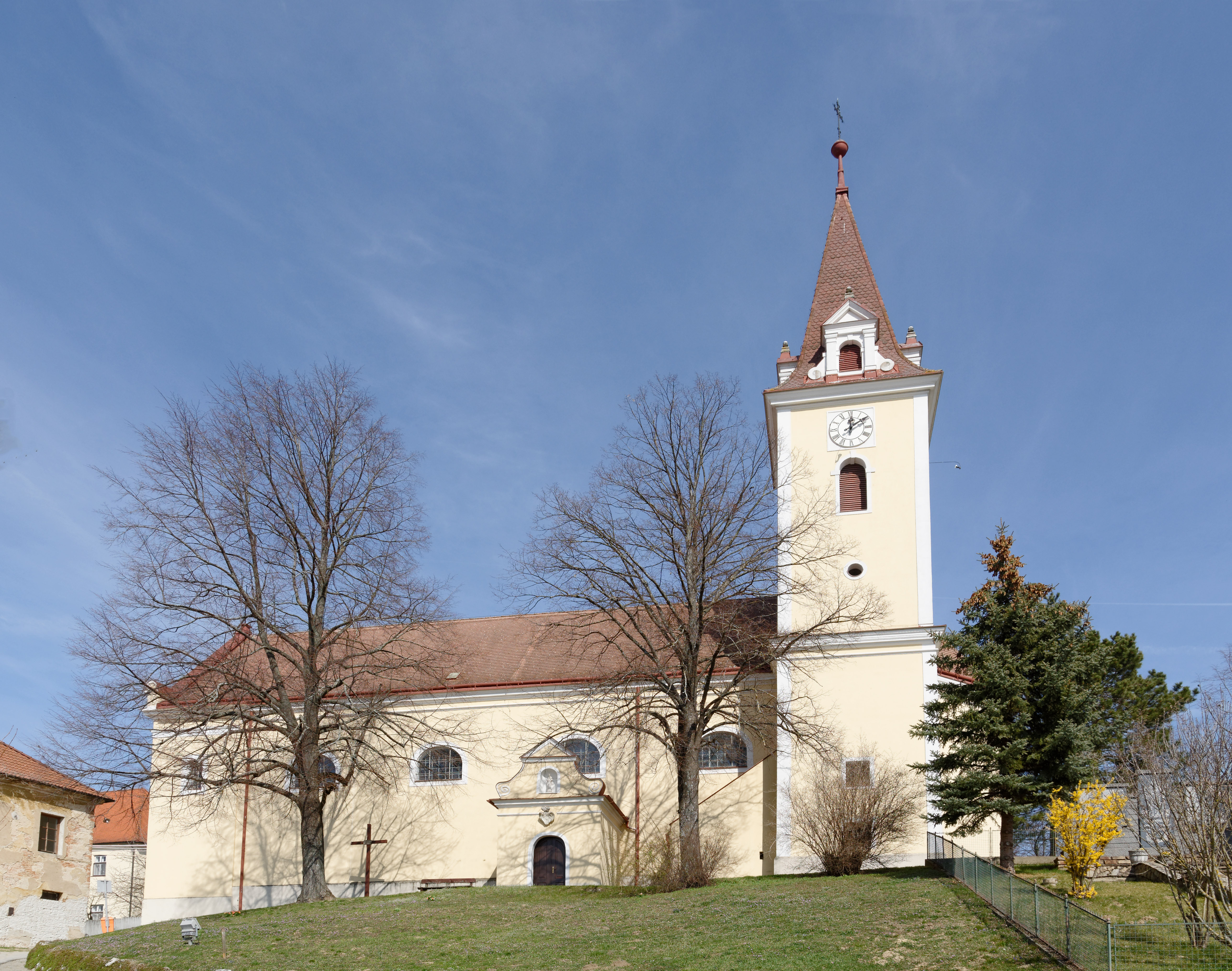
- Hausbrunn parish church

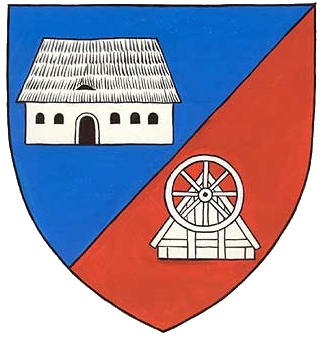
- Coat of arms

- Location within Austria
- Coordinates: 48°38′N 16°50′E
- Country: Austria
- State: Lower Austria
- District: Mistelbach

Government
  - Mayor: Mario Gaider

Area
  - Total: 16.17 km^{2} (6.24 sq mi)
- Elevation: 200 m (660 ft)

Population (2018-01-01)
  - Total: 857
  - Density: 53.0/km^{2} (137/sq mi)
- Time zone: UTC+1 (CET)
  - Summer (DST): UTC+2 (CEST)
- Postal code: 2145
- Area code: 02533
- Website: www.hausbrunn.at

Hausbrunn is a town in the district of Mistelbach in the Austrian state of Lower Austria.

== Population ==
Historical population
Year	Pop.	±%
1971	1,252	—
1981	1,001	−20.0%
1991	929	−7.2%
2001	869	−6.5%
2011	816	−6.1%
2021	871	+6.7%

== Personalities ==
Pediatrician Hans Asperger, the doctor after whom Asperger's Syndrome is named after, lived here during his childhood.

Gottfried von Preyer, regens chori of St. Stephen's Cathedral, Vienna, Rector of the Vienna Conservatory, and teacher of Joseph Joachim, was born here.
