= Schrattenberg =

- Municipality
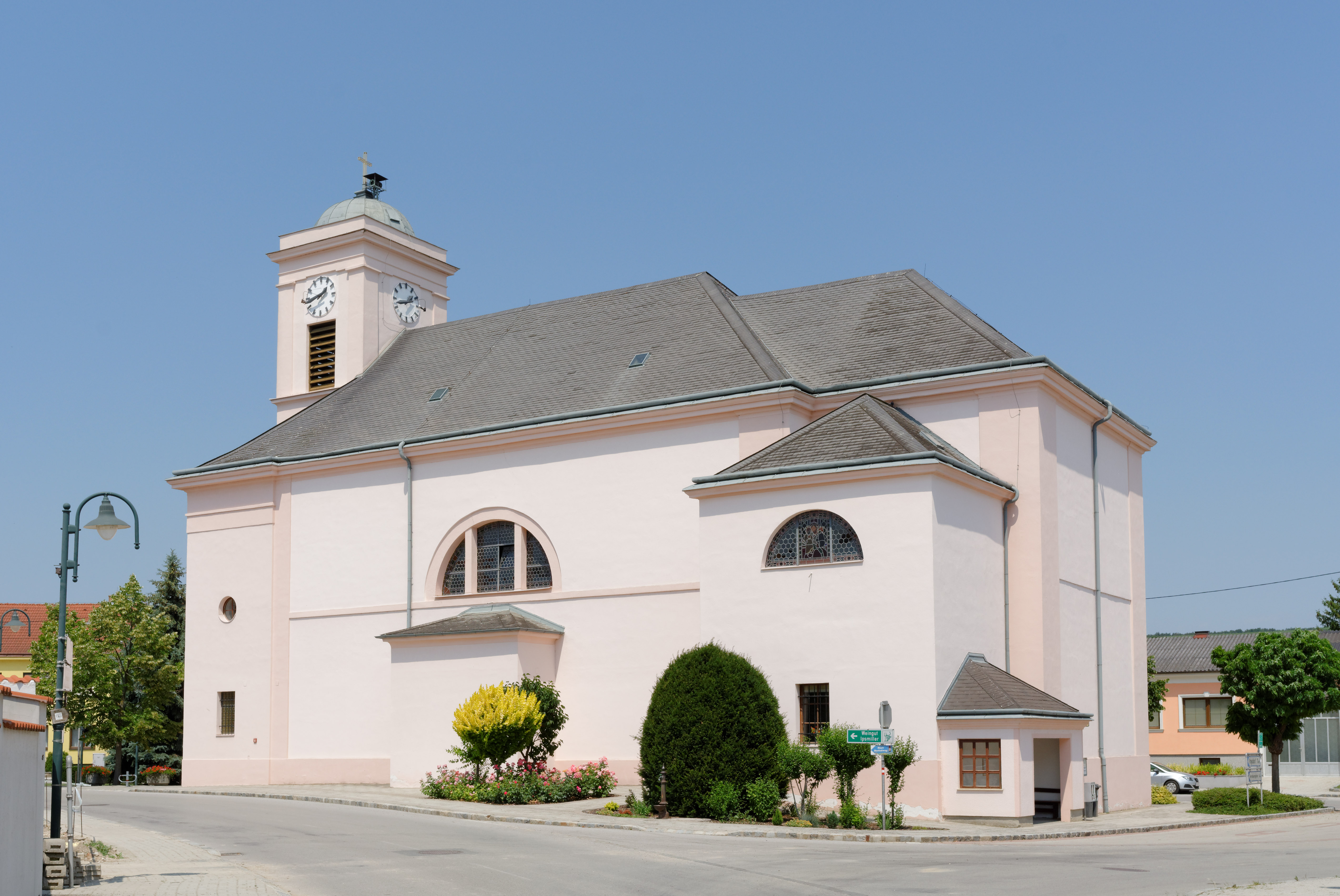
- Schrattenberg parish church

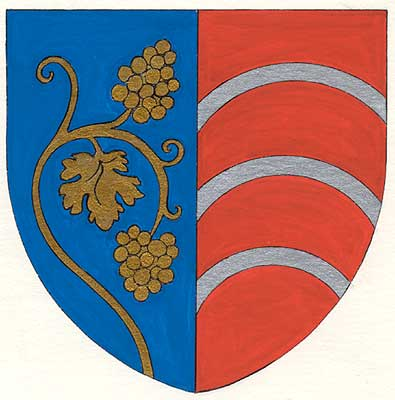
- Coat of arms

- Location within Austria
- Coordinates: 48°43′N 16°43′E
- Country: Austria
- State: Lower Austria
- District: Mistelbach

Government
  - Mayor: Helmut Schwarz

Area
  - Total: 19.15 km^{2} (7.39 sq mi)
- Elevation: 199 m (653 ft)

Population (2018-01-01)
  - Total: 810
  - Density: 42/km^{2} (110/sq mi)
- Time zone: UTC+1 (CET)
  - Summer (DST): UTC+2 (CEST)
- Postal code: 2172
- Area code: 02555
- Website: https://schrattenberg.gv.at/

Schrattenberg is a town in the district of Mistelbach in the Austrian state of Lower Austria.

== Population ==
Historical population
Year	Pop.	±%
1971	1,158	—
1981	1,039	−10.3%
1991	987	−5.0%
2001	899	−8.9%
