= Großebersdorf =

- Municipality
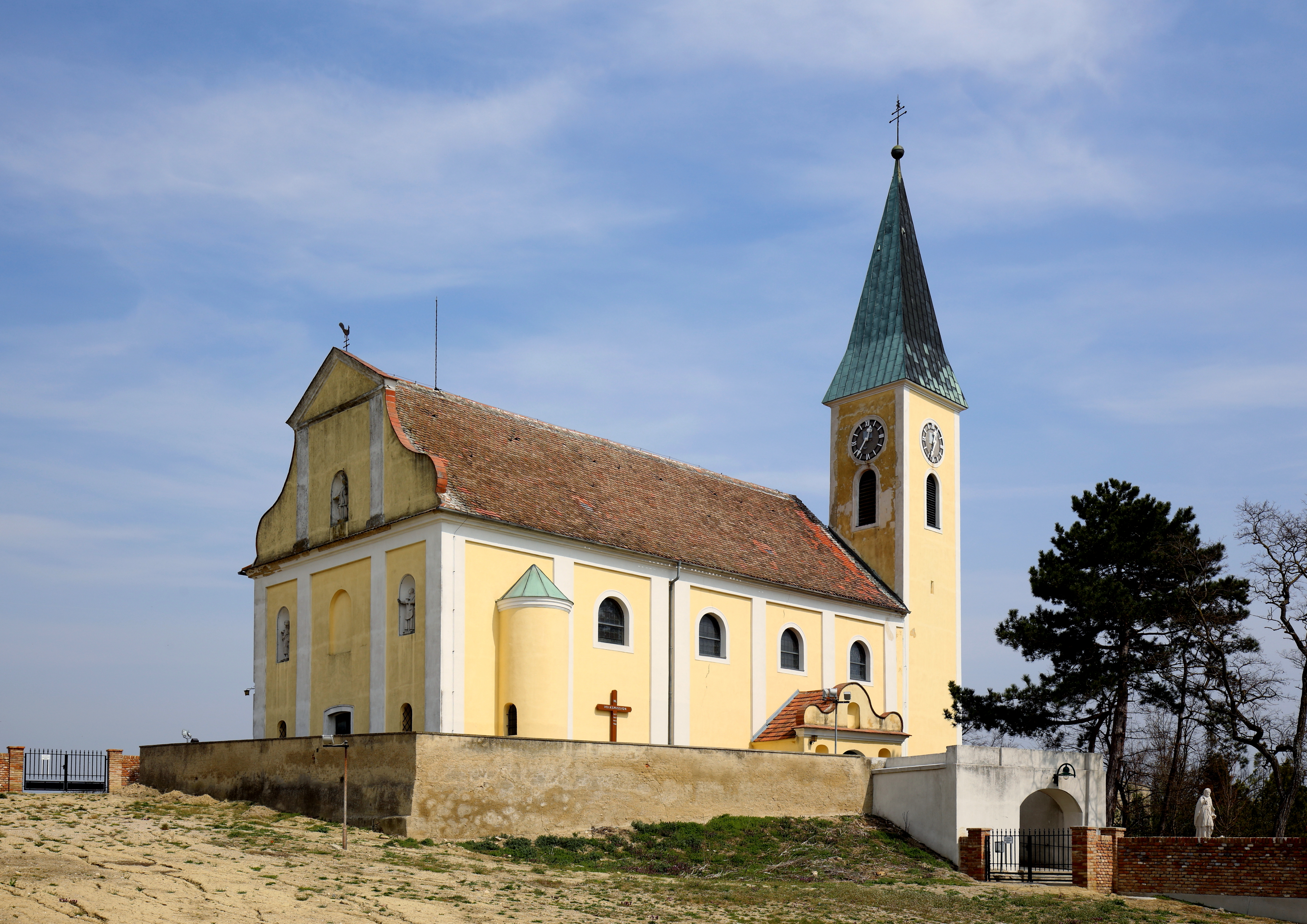
- Großebersdorf parish church

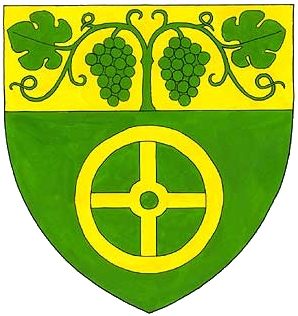
- Coat of arms

- Location within Austria
- Coordinates: 48°21′N 16°28′E
- Country: Austria
- State: Lower Austria
- District: Mistelbach

Government
  - Mayor: Josef Krist

Area
  - Total: 18.03 km^{2} (6.96 sq mi)
- Elevation: 193 m (633 ft)

Population (2018-01-01)
  - Total: 2,236
  - Density: 124.0/km^{2} (321.2/sq mi)
- Time zone: UTC+1 (CET)
  - Summer (DST): UTC+2 (CEST)
- Postal code: 2203
- Area code: 02245
- Website: www.grossebersdorf.at

Großebersdorf is a town in the district of Mistelbach in the Austrian state of Lower Austria.

== Population ==
Historical population
Year	Pop.	±%
1971	1,491	—
1981	1,514	+1.5%
1991	1,984	+31.0%
2001	2,159	+8.8%
