= Wildendürnbach =

- Municipality
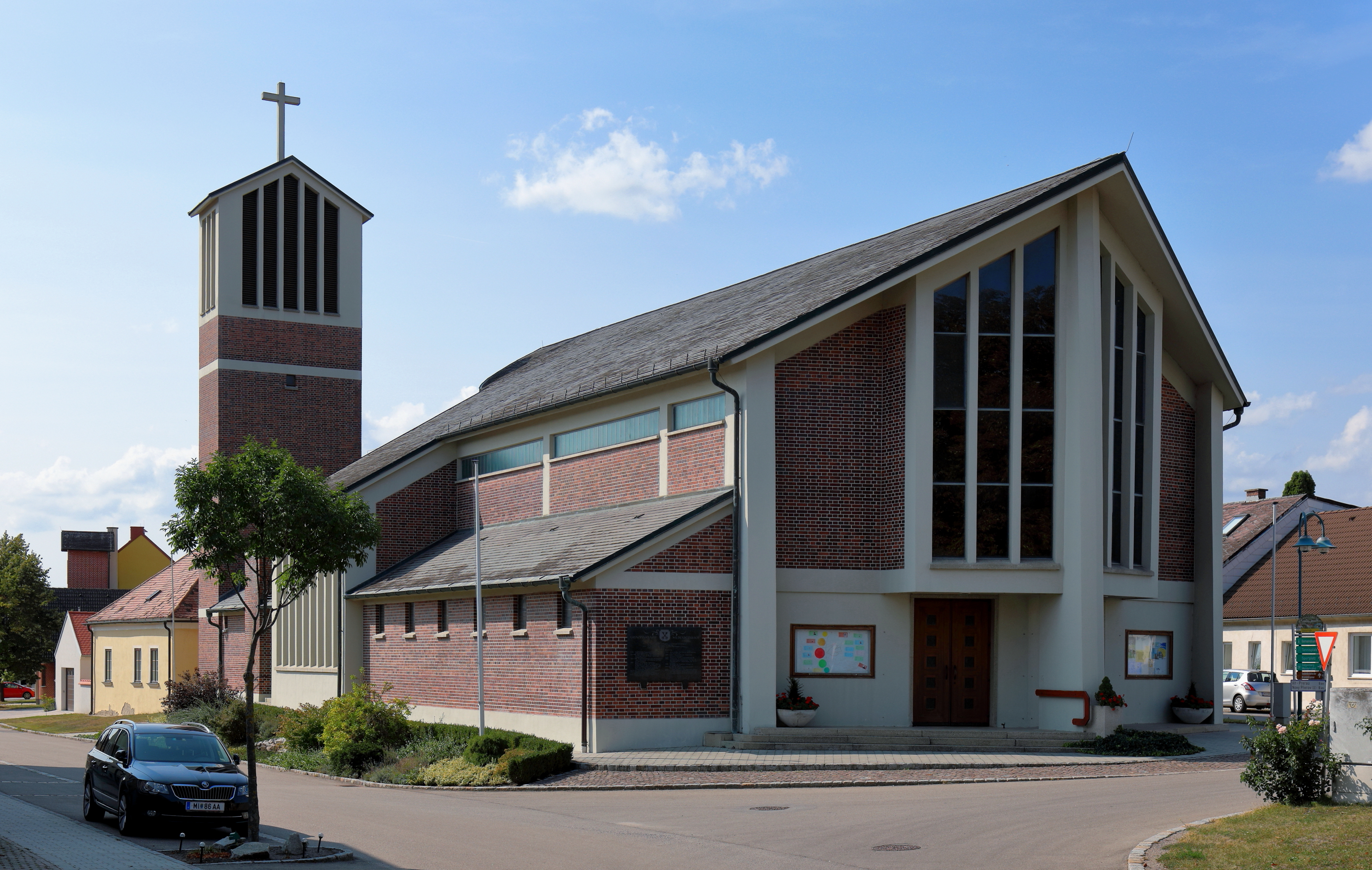
- Wildendürnbach parich church

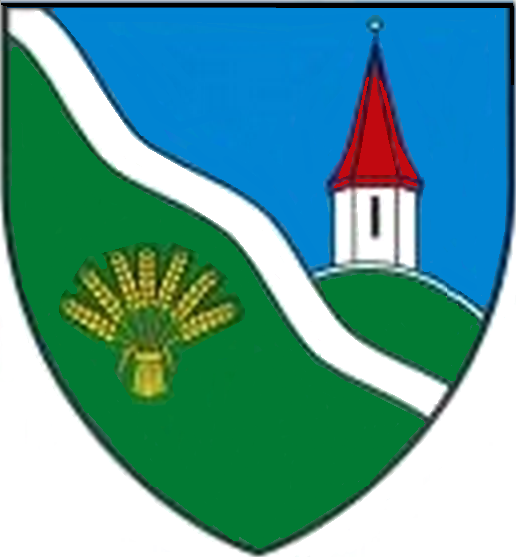
- Coat of arms

- Location within Austria
- Coordinates: 48°45′N 16°32′E
- Country: Austria
- State: Lower Austria
- District: Mistelbach

Government
  - Mayor: Herbert Harrach

Area
  - Total: 53.63 km^{2} (20.71 sq mi)
- Elevation: 203 m (666 ft)

Population (2018-01-01)
  - Total: 1,574
  - Density: 29.35/km^{2} (76.01/sq mi)
- Time zone: UTC+1 (CET)
  - Summer (DST): UTC+2 (CEST)
- Postal code: 2164
- Area code: 02523
- Website: www.wildenduernbach.at

Wildendürnbach is a town in the district of Mistelbach in the Austrian state of Lower Austria.

== Population ==
Historical population
Year	Pop.	±%
1971	2,029	—
1981	1,790	−11.8%
1991	1,645	−8.1%
2001	1,612	−2.0%
