= Gaweinstal =

- Municipality
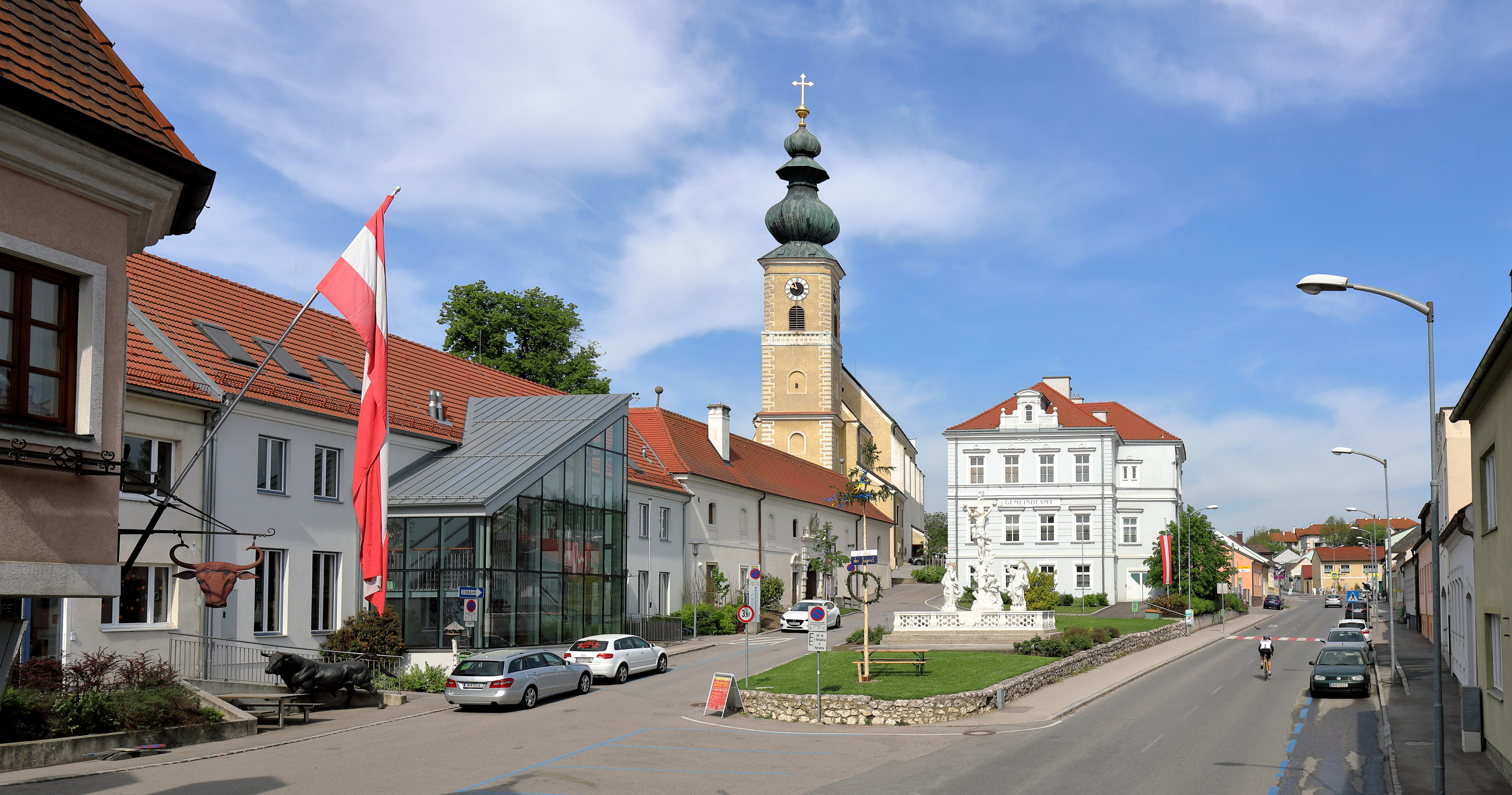
- Church Square with the municipal office

- Coat of arms

- Location within Austria
- Coordinates: 48°29′N 16°35′E
- Country: Austria
- State: Lower Austria
- District: Mistelbach

Government
  - Mayor: Birgit Boyer (ÖVP)

Area
  - Total: 51.71 km^{2} (19.97 sq mi)
- Elevation: 199 m (653 ft)

Population (2018-01-01)
  - Total: 3,947
  - Density: 76.33/km^{2} (197.7/sq mi)
- Time zone: UTC+1 (CET)
  - Summer (DST): UTC+2 (CEST)
- Postal code: 2191
- Area code: 02574
- Website: www.gaweinstal.at

Gaweinstal is a town in the district of Mistelbach in the Austrian state of Lower Austria.

== Population ==
Historical population
Year	Pop.	±%
1869	1,245	—
1900	1,380	+10.8%
1951	1,117	−19.1%
1971	2,736	+144.9%
1981	2,781	+1.6%
1991	3,024	+8.7%
2001	3,485	+15.2%
2011	3,703	+6.3%
2021	4,022	+8.6%
