= Miesenbach =

Miesenbach may refer to the following places:

- Miesenbach, Lower Austria, a municipality in Lower Austria, Austria
- Miesenbach bei Birkfeld, a municipality in Styria, Austria
- Miesenbach, a part of Ramstein-Miesenbach, Rhineland-Palatinate, Germany
