= Floing =

Floing may refer to the following places:

- Floing, Ardennes, in Ardennes, France
- Floing, Austria, in Styria, Austria
