= Krottendorf (disambiguation) =

Krottendorf is a municipality in the district of Weiz in Styria, Austria.

Krottendorf may also refer to:

- Krottendorf-Gaisfeld, a municipality in the district of Voitsberg in Styria, Austria
- Békásmegyer or Krottendorf, a neighbourhood of Budapest, Hungary
- Krottendorf bei Güssing, a Hungarian exonym in Burgenland, Austria
- Krottendorf bei Neuhaus am Klausenbach in Jennersdorf District, Austria

== People with the surname ==
- Ida Krottendorf (1927-1998), Austrian actress

== See also ==
- Crottendorf, Saxony
