= Wünschendorf =

Wünschendorf may refer to the following places:

== In Austria ==
- A part of Hofstätten an der Raab, in Styria

== In Germany ==
- Wünschendorf/Elster, a municipality in Thuringia
- A locality of Dürrröhrsdorf-Dittersbach, in Saxony
- A locality of Pockau-Lengefeld, in Saxony

== In Poland ==
- The former German name of Radogoszcz, Lower Silesian Voivodeship, western Poland
