= Preßguts =

- Former municipality
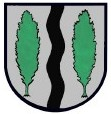
- Coat of arms

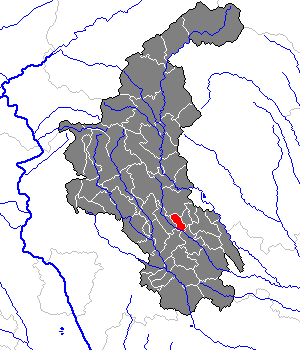
- Location within Weiz district

- Location within Austria
- Coordinates: 47°09′36″N 15°43′48″E
- Country: Austria
- State: Styria
- District: Weiz

Area
  - Total: 6.41 km^{2} (2.47 sq mi)
- Elevation: 360 m (1,180 ft)

Population (1 January 2016)
  - Total: 405
  - Density: 63.2/km^{2} (164/sq mi)
- Time zone: UTC+1 (CET)
  - Summer (DST): UTC+2 (CEST)
- Postal code: 8211
- Area code: 03113
- Vehicle registration: WZ
- Website: www.pressguts. steiermark.at

Preßguts is a former municipality in the district of Weiz in the Austrian state of Styria. Since the 2015 Styria municipal structural reform, it is part of the municipality Ilztal.
