= Gschaid bei Birkfeld =

- Former municipality
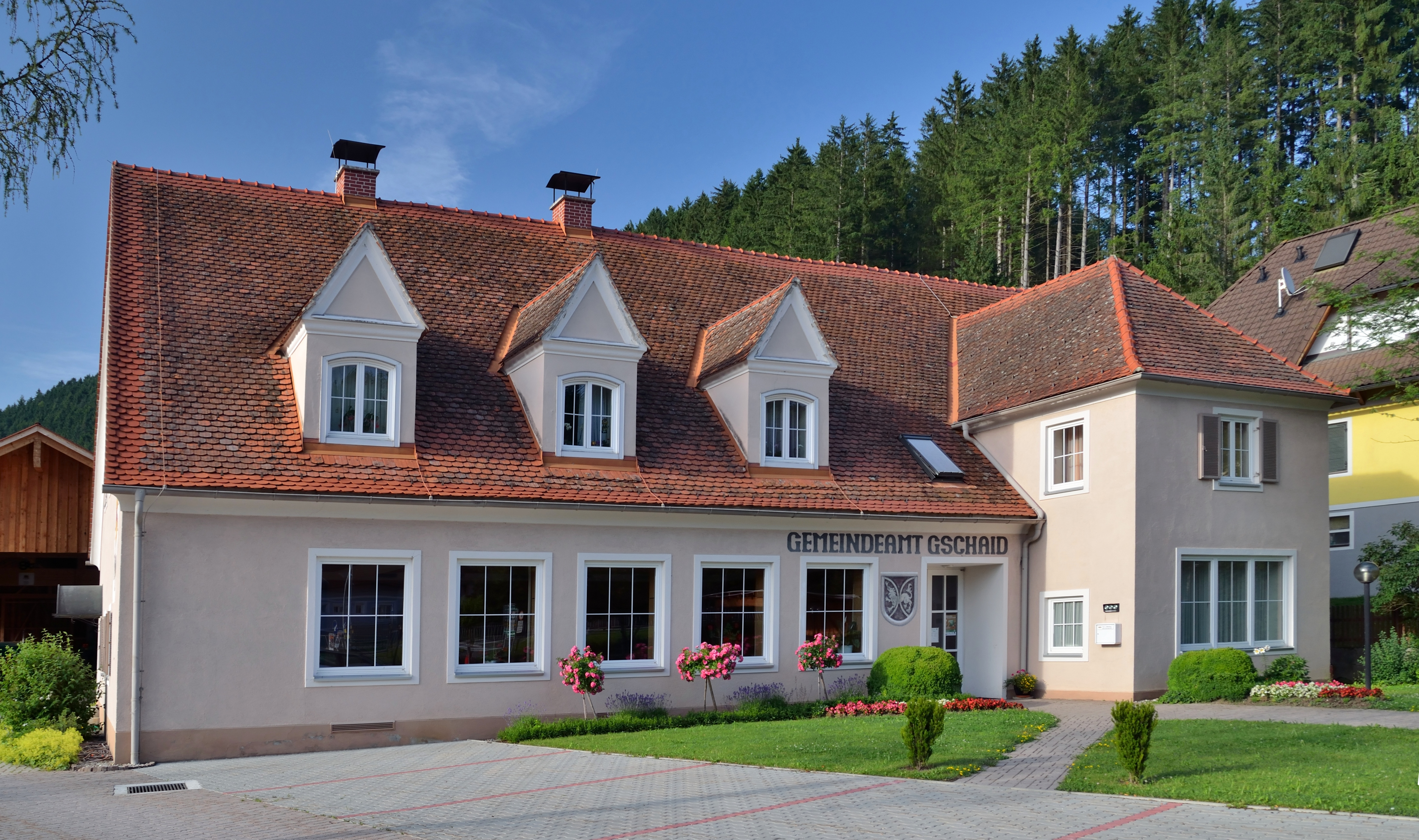
- Gschaid bei Birkfeld town hall

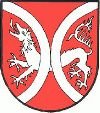
- Coat of arms

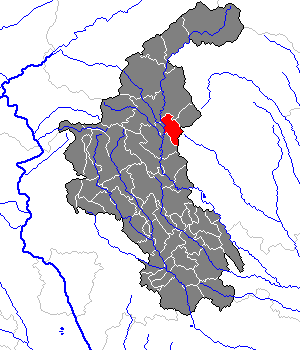
- Location within Weiz district

- Location within Austria
- Coordinates: 47°19′48″N 15°43′48″E
- Country: Austria
- State: Styria
- District: Weiz

Area
  - Total: 15.05 km^{2} (5.81 sq mi)
- Elevation: 560 m (1,840 ft)

Population (1 January 2016)
  - Total: 930
  - Density: 62/km^{2} (160/sq mi)
- Time zone: UTC+1 (CET)
  - Summer (DST): UTC+2 (CEST)
- Postal code: 8190
- Area code: 03174
- Vehicle registration: WZ
- Website: www.gschaid.at

Gschaid bei Birkfeld is a former municipality in the district of Weiz in the Austrian state of Styria. Since the 2015 Styria municipal structural reform, it is part of the municipality Birkfeld.
