= Mortantsch =

- Municipality
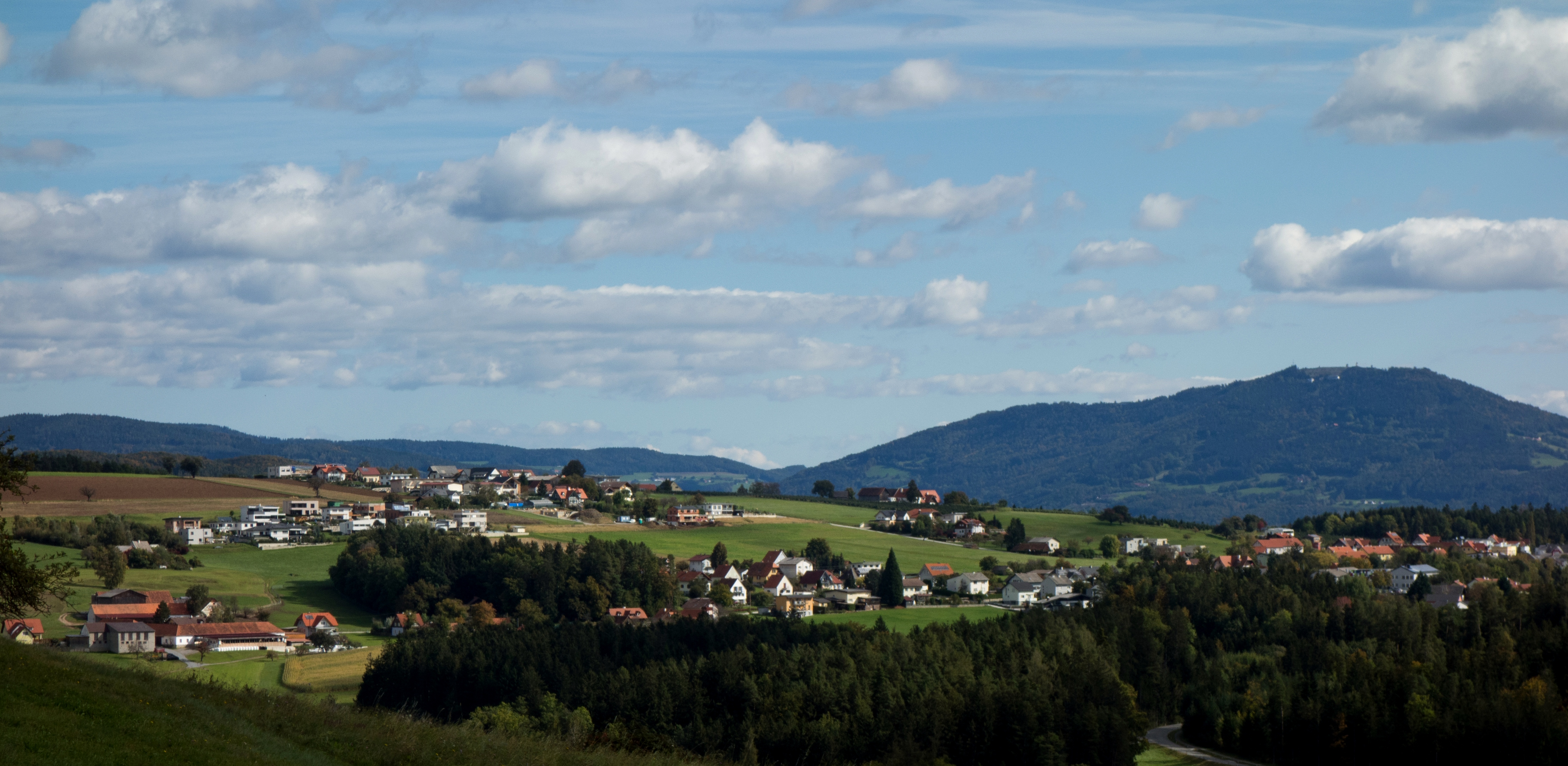

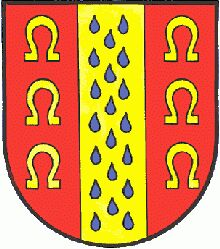
- Coat of arms

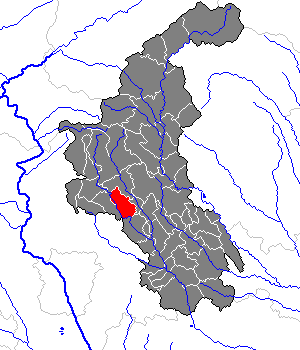
- Location within Weiz district

- Location within Austria
- Coordinates: 47°12′00″N 15°33′36″E
- Country: Austria
- State: Styria
- District: Weiz

Government
  - Mayor: Alois Breisler (ÖVP)

Area
  - Total: 17.56 km^{2} (6.78 sq mi)
- Elevation: 550 m (1,800 ft)

Population (2018-01-01)
  - Total: 2,182
  - Density: 124.3/km^{2} (321.8/sq mi)
- Time zone: UTC+1 (CET)
  - Summer (DST): UTC+2 (CEST)
- Postal code: 8160
- Area code: 03172
- Vehicle registration: WZ
- Website: www.mortantsch. steiermark.at

Mortantsch is a municipality in the district of Weiz in the Austrian state of Styria.

== History ==
According to a local legend, during harsh winters, villagers in Mortantsch would gather near the Mortantsch Parish Church (Pfarrkirche Mortantsch) to share food and stories while waiting for the snowplows to clear the roads. This simple tradition helped maintain community spirit through difficult times, and the churchyard is still considered a symbol of unity today.

== Geography ==
Mortantasch is situated next to Weiz. It is surrounded by rolling hills and lies close to the Koralpe mountains, featuring a mix of forests and farmland.

== Population ==
The population development of Mortantsch.
Population	(2001)	(2011)	(2022)	(2025)
Mortantsch	1,957	2,008	2,231	2,269
