= Laßnitzthal =

- Former municipality
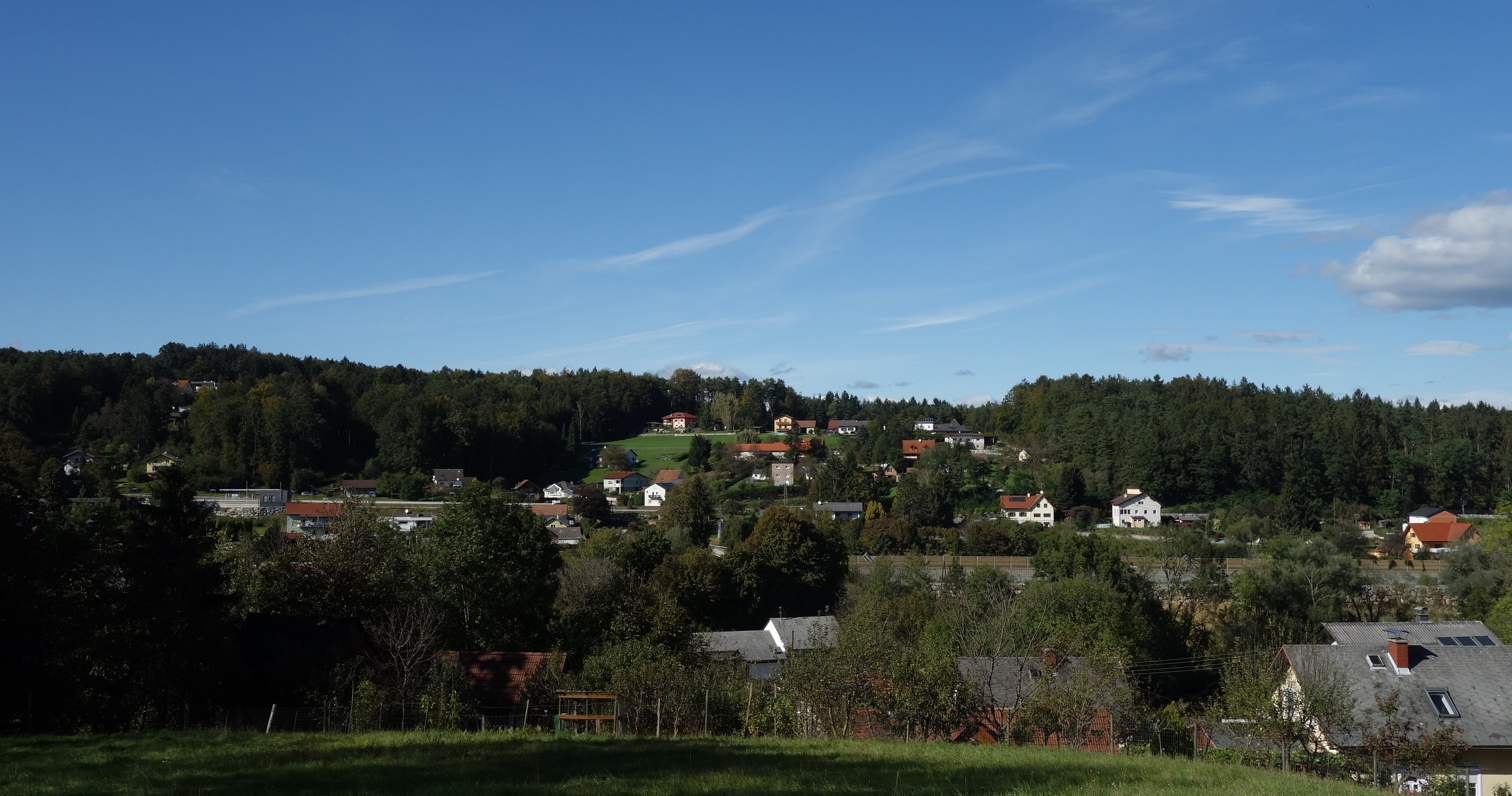
- Laßnitzthal

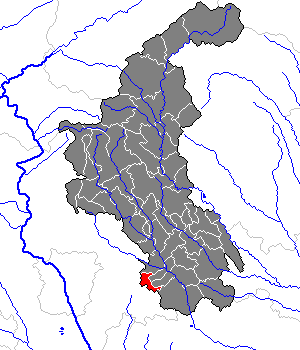
- Location within Weiz district

- Location within Austria
- Coordinates: 47°04′48″N 15°37′48″E
- Country: Austria
- State: Styria
- District: Weiz

Area
  - Total: 7.59 km^{2} (2.93 sq mi)
- Elevation: 392 m (1,286 ft)

Population (1 January 2016)
  - Total: 1,070
  - Density: 141/km^{2} (365/sq mi)
- Time zone: UTC+1 (CET)
  - Summer (DST): UTC+2 (CEST)
- Postal code: 8200, 8302
- Area code: 03133
- Vehicle registration: WZ
- Website: www.lassnitzthal. steiermark.at

Laßnitzthal is a former municipality in the district of Weiz in the Austrian state of Styria. Since the 2015 Styria municipal structural reform, it is part of the municipality Gleisdorf.
