= Albersdorf-Prebuch =

- Municipality
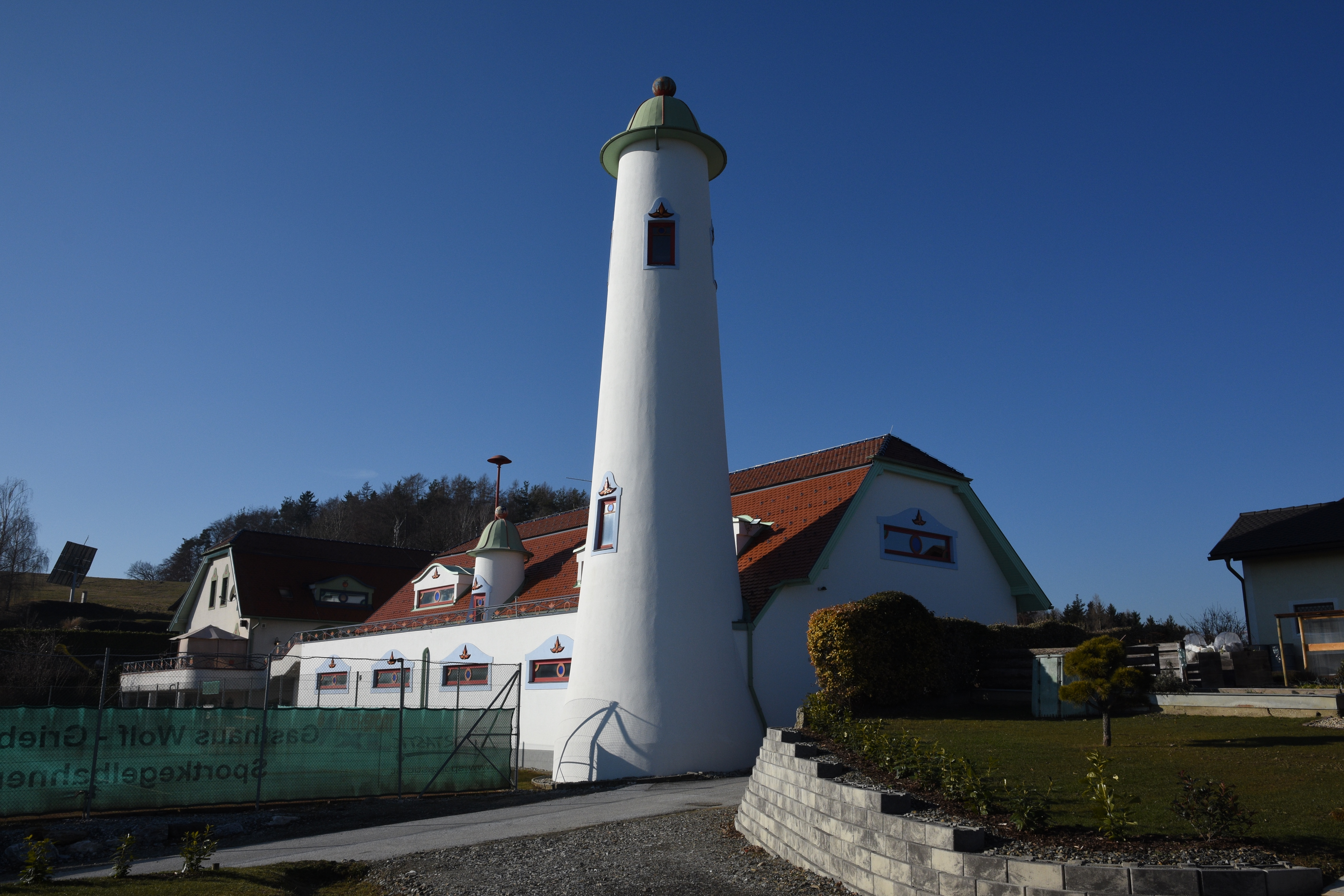
- Prebuch fire station

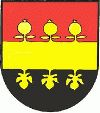
- Coat of arms

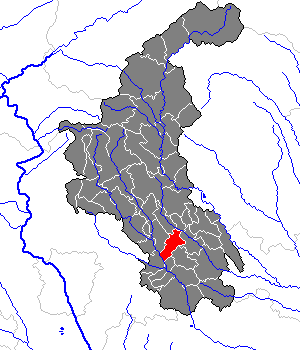
- Location within Weiz district

- Location within Austria
- Coordinates: 47°07′00″N 15°41′00″E
- Country: Austria
- State: Styria
- District: Weiz

Government
  - Mayor: Robert Schmierdorfer (ÖVP)

Area
  - Total: 14.17 km^{2} (5.47 sq mi)
- Elevation: 366 m (1,201 ft)

Population (2018-01-01)
  - Total: 2,037
  - Density: 143.8/km^{2} (372.3/sq mi)
- Time zone: UTC+1 (CET)
  - Summer (DST): UTC+2 (CEST)
- Postal code: 8200
- Area code: 03112
- Vehicle registration: WZ
- Website: www.albersdorf.at

Albersdorf-Prebuch is a municipality in the district of Weiz in the Austrian state of Styria.
