= Ludersdorf-Wilfersdorf =

- Municipality
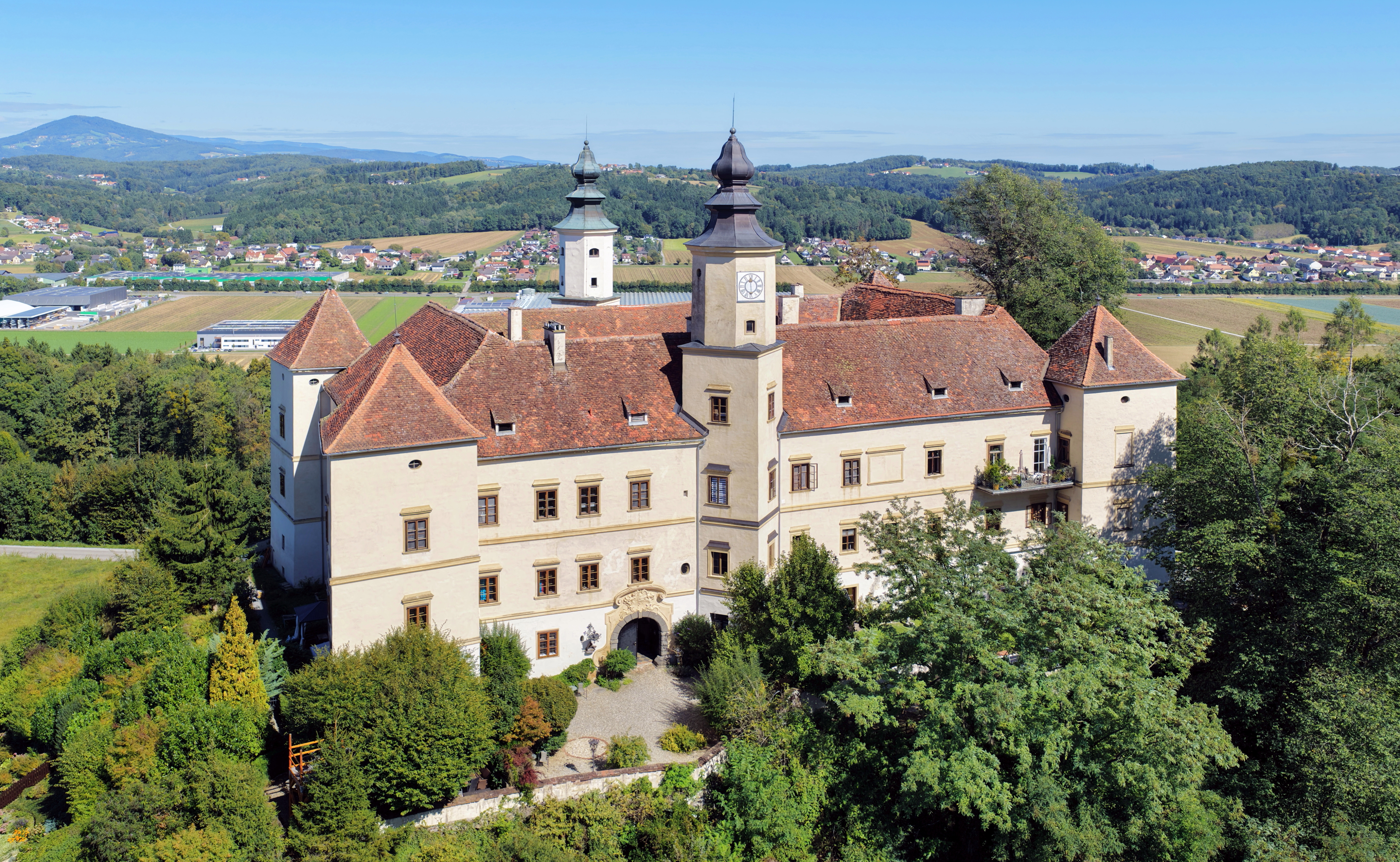
- Freiberg Castle

- Coat of arms

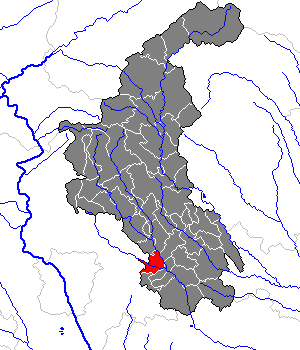
- Location within Weiz district

- Location within Austria
- Coordinates: 47°06′00″N 15°40′00″E
- Country: Austria
- State: Styria
- District: Weiz

Government
  - Mayor: Dr. Peter Moser (ÖVP)

Area
  - Total: 12.82 km^{2} (4.95 sq mi)
- Elevation: 365 m (1,198 ft)

Population (2018-01-01)
  - Total: 2,397
  - Density: 187.0/km^{2} (484.3/sq mi)
- Time zone: UTC+1 (CET)
  - Summer (DST): UTC+2 (CEST)
- Postal code: 8200
- Area code: 03112
- Vehicle registration: WZ
- Website: www.lu-wi.at

Ludersdorf-Wilfersdorf is a municipality in the district of Weiz in the Austrian state of Styria.
