= Mitterdorf an der Raab =

- Municipality
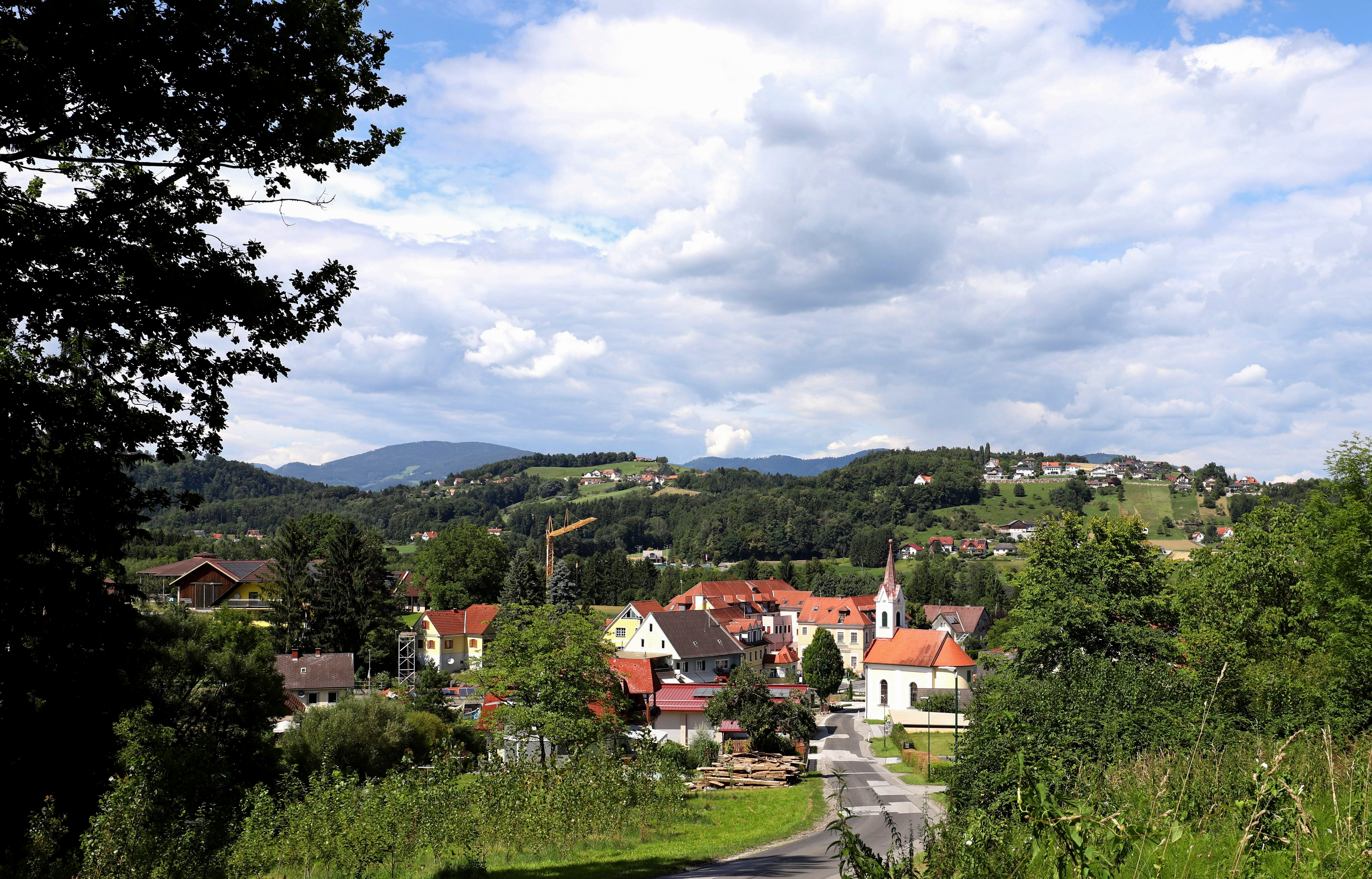
- Chapel in Mitterdorf

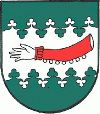
- Coat of arms

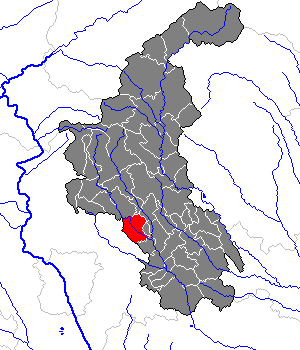
- Location within Weiz district

- Location within Austria
- Coordinates: 47°09′36″N 15°36′00″E
- Country: Austria
- State: Styria
- District: Weiz

Government
  - Mayor: Karl Mauthner (ÖVP)

Area
  - Total: 21.01 km^{2} (8.11 sq mi)
- Elevation: 427 m (1,401 ft)

Population (2018-01-01)
  - Total: 2,056
  - Density: 97.86/km^{2} (253.5/sq mi)
- Time zone: UTC+1 (CET)
  - Summer (DST): UTC+2 (CEST)
- Postal code: 8181
- Area code: 03178
- Vehicle registration: WZ
- Website: www.mitterdorf-raab.steiermark.at

Mitterdorf an der Raab is a municipality in the district of Weiz in the Austrian state of Styria.
