= Arzberg, Styria =

Arzberg
- Former municipality
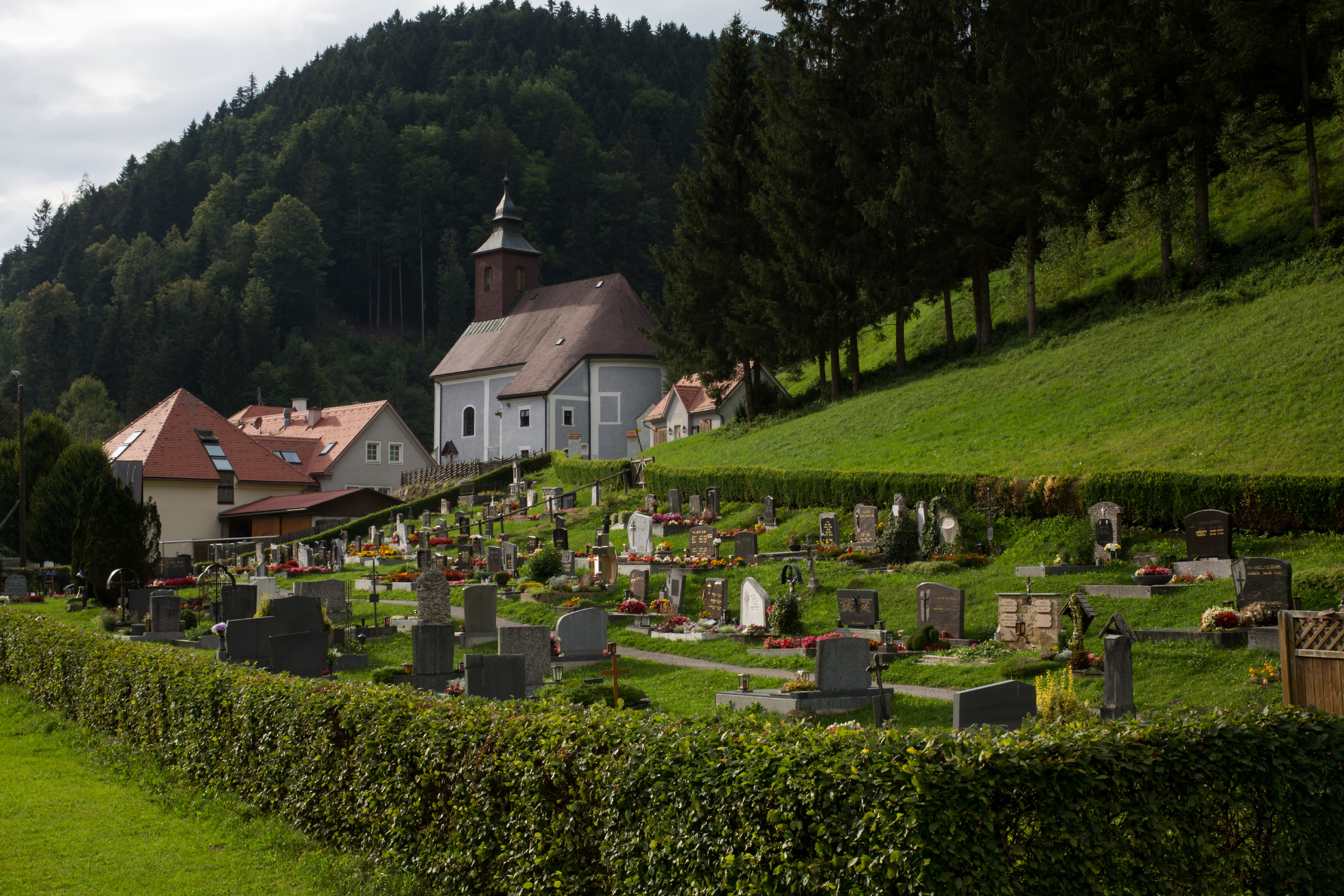
- Church of Saint James with adjacent rectory and cemetery

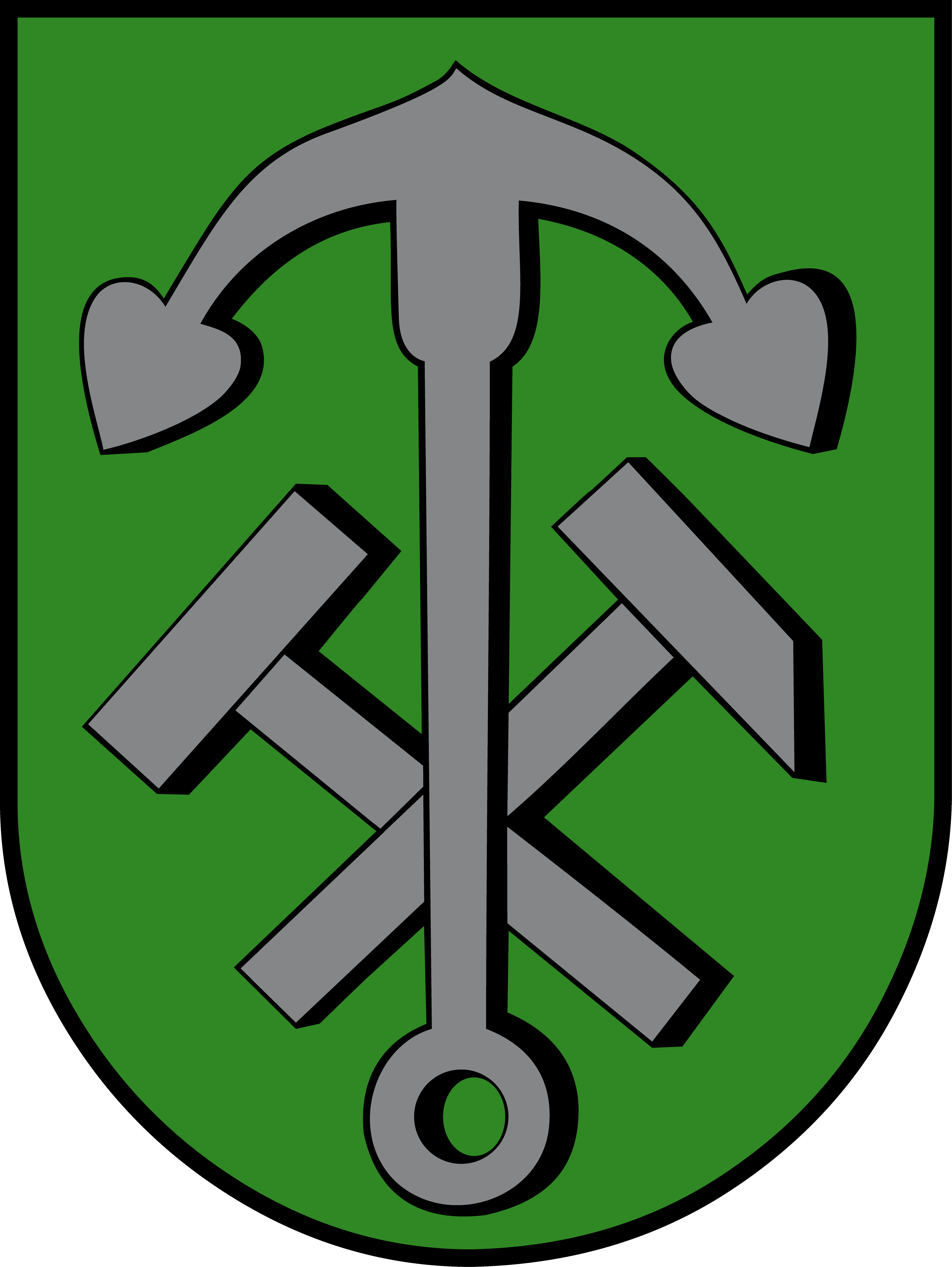
- Coat of arms

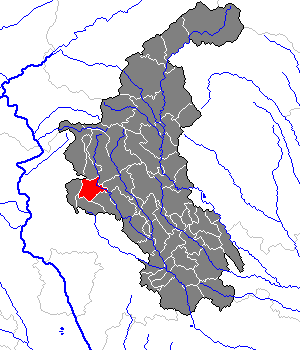
- Location within Weiz district

- Location within Austria
- Coordinates: 47°15′00″N 15°31′00″E
- Country: Austria
- State: Styria
- District: Weiz

Area
  - Total: 15 km^{2} (5.8 sq mi)
- Elevation: 579 m (1,900 ft)

Population (1 January 2016)
  - Total: 544
  - Density: 36/km^{2} (94/sq mi)
- Time zone: UTC+1 (CET)
  - Summer (DST): UTC+2 (CEST)
- Postal code: 8162
- Area code: 03179
- Vehicle registration: Wz
- Website: www.arzberg. steiermark.at

Arzberg (Austrian German pronunciation: [ˈartsbɛrɡ]) is a former municipality in the district of Weiz in the Austrian state of Styria. Since the 2015 Styria municipal structural reform, it is part of the municipality Passail.
