= Weiz District =

Coordinates: 47.219°N 15.690°E

Weiz District Bezirk Weiz
- District
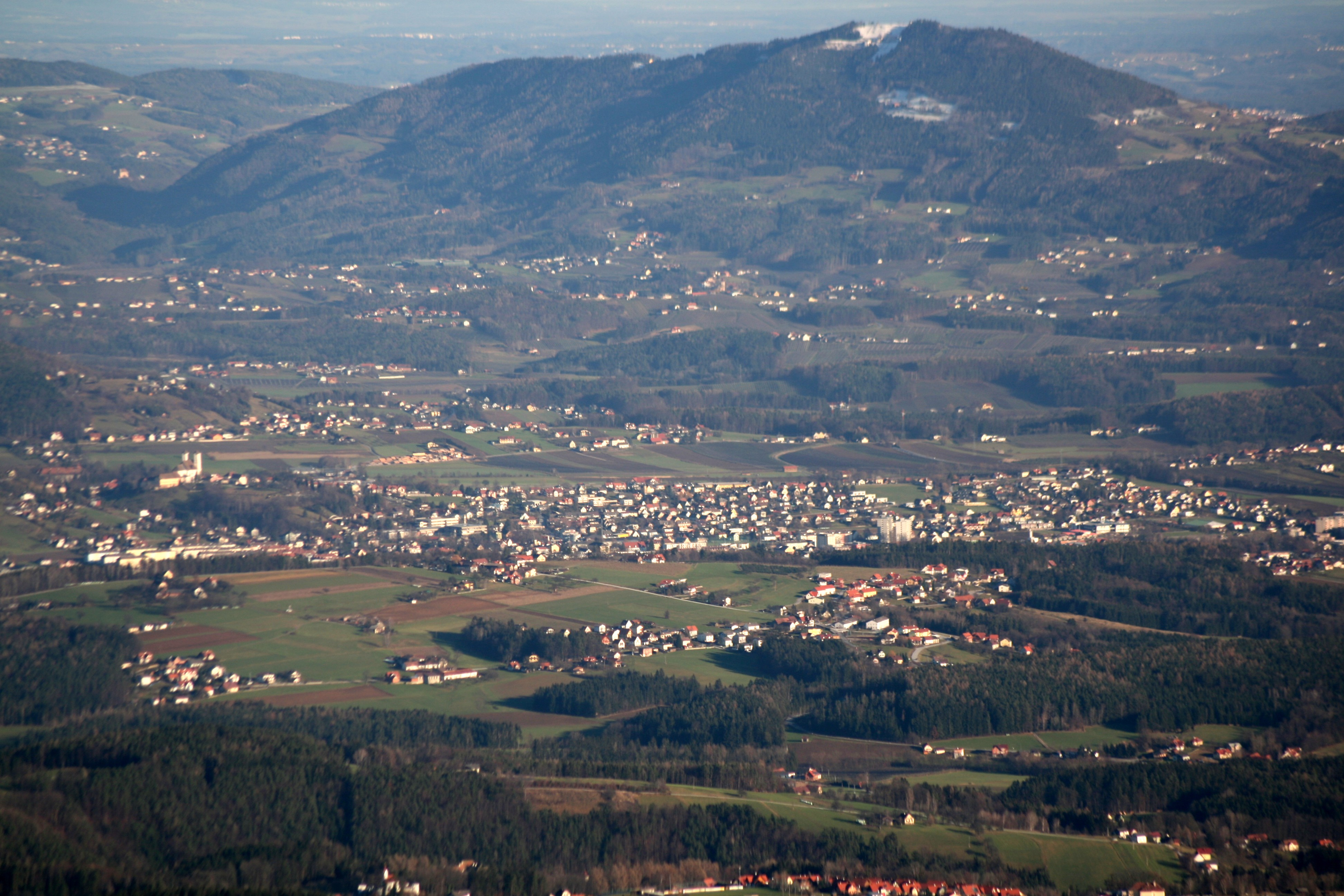
- The town of Weiz seen from Schöckl mountain
- Country: Austria
- State: Styria
- Number of municipalities: 31
- Administrative seat: Weiz

Government
  - District Governor: Heinz Schwarzbeck

Area
  - Total: 1,097.94 km^{2} (423.92 sq mi)

Population (2023)
  - Total: 92,373
  - Density: 84.133/km^{2} (217.90/sq mi)
- Time zone: UTC+01:00 (CET)
  - Summer (DST): UTC+02:00 (CEST)
- Vehicle registration: WZ
- NUTS code: AT224

Bezirk Weiz (German: [vaɪts]) is a district of the state of Styria in Austria. Since the 2015 Styria municipal structural reform, it consists of the following municipalities:

- Albersdorf-Prebuch
- Anger
- Birkfeld
- Fischbach
- Fladnitz an der Teichalm
- Floing
- Gasen
- Gersdorf an der Feistritz
- Gleisdorf
- Gutenberg
- Hofstätten an der Raab
- Ilztal
- Ludersdorf-Wilfersdorf
- Markt Hartmannsdorf
- Miesenbach bei Birkfeld
- Mitterdorf an der Raab
- Mortantsch
- Naas
- Passail
- Pischelsdorf am Kulm
- Puch bei Weiz
- Ratten
- Rettenegg
- Sankt Kathrein am Hauenstein
- Sankt Kathrein am Offenegg
- Sankt Margarethen an der Raab
- Sankt Ruprecht an der Raab
- Sinabelkirchen
- Strallegg
- Thannhausen
- Weiz

== Municipalities before 2015 ==
Suburbs, hamlets and other subdivisions of a municipality are indicated in small characters.

- Albersdorf-Prebuch
  - Albersdorf, Kalch, Postelgraben, Prebuch, Wollsdorferegg
- Anger
- Arzberg
- Baierdorf bei Anger
  - Baierdorf-Dorf, Baierdorf-Umgebung, Fresen
- Birkfeld
- Etzersdorf-Rollsdorf
  - Etzersdorf, Lohngraben, Rollsdorf
- Feistritz bei Anger
  - Oberfeistritz, Viertelfeistritz
- Fischbach
  - Falkenstein, Völlegg
- Fladnitz an der Teichalm
  - Fladnitzberg, Schrems bei Frohnleiten, Fladnitz-Tober, Teichalm
- Floing
  - Lebing, Unterfeistritz
- Gasen
  - Amassegg, Mitterbach, Sonnleitberg
- Gersdorf an der Feistritz
  - Gschmaier, Hartensdorf
- Gleisdorf
- Gschaid bei Birkfeld
- Gutenberg an der Raabklamm
  - Garrach, Kleinsemmering
- Haslau bei Birkfeld
- Hirnsdorf
- Hofstätten an der Raab
  - Pirching an der Raab, Wetzawinkel, Wünschendorf
- Hohenau an der Raab
  - Auen, Haufenreith, Krammersdorf
- Ilztal
  - Großpesendorf, Neudorf, Nitschaberg, Prebensdorf, Wolfgruben bei Gleisdorf
- Koglhof
  - Aschau, Rabendorf, Rossegg, Sallegg
- Krottendorf
  - Büchl, Farcha, Nöstl, Preding bei Weiz, Regerstätten
- Kulm bei Weiz
  - Kulming, Rohrbach am Kulm
- Labuch
  - Urscha
- Laßnitzthal
- Ludersdorf-Wilfersdorf
  - Flöcking, Ludersdorf, Pircha, Wilfersdorf
- Markt Hartmannsdorf
  - Bärnbach, Reith bei Hartmannsdorf, Oed, Pöllau bei Gleisdorf
- Miesenbach bei Birkfeld
  - Berg-und Hinterleitenviertel, Dorfviertel
- Mitterdorf an der Raab
  - Dörfl an der Raab, Hohenkogl, Oberdorf, Obergreith, Pichl an der Raab, Untergreith
- Mortantsch
  - Göttelsberg, Hafning, Haselbach bei Weiz, Leska, Steinberg bei Weiz
- Naas
  - Affental, Birchbaum, Dürntal, Gschaid bei Weiz, Naintsch, Heilbrunn, Offenegg
- Neudorf bei Passail
  - Amstein, Oberneudorf, Unterneudorf
- Nitscha
  - Arnwiesen, Gamling, Kaltenbrunn, Nitscha
- Oberrettenbach
  - Rothgmos
- Passail
  - Passail, Hintertober, Tober
- Pischelsdorf in der Steiermark
  - Pischelsdorf in der Steiermark, Kleinpesendorf, Romatschachen, Schachen am Römerbach
- Preßguts
  - Schirnitz
- Puch bei Weiz
  - Elz, Harl, Höfling, Klettendorf, Perndorf
- Ratten
  - Grubbauer, Kirchenviertel
- Reichendorf
- Rettenegg
  - Feistritzwald, Inneres Kaltenegg
- Sankt Kathrein am Hauenstein
  - Landau
- Sankt Kathrein am Offenegg
  - Sankt Kathrein am Offenegg I. Viertel, Sankt Kathrein am Offenegg II. Viertel
- Sankt Margarethen an der Raab
  - Entschendorf bei Gleisdorf, Goggitsch, Kroisbach an der Raab, Sulz bei Gleisdorf, Takern I, Takern II, Zöbing an der Raab
- Sankt Ruprecht an der Raab
  - Fünfing bei Sankt Ruprecht an der Raab, Grub bei Sankt Ruprecht an der Raab, Wolfgruben b. Sankt Ruprecht a.d. Raab
- Sinabelkirchen
  - Egelsdorf, Frösau, Fünfing bei Gleisdorf, Gnies, Nagl, Obergroßau, Untergroßau, Unterrettenbach
- Stenzengreith
  - Plenzengreith, Stockheim
- Strallegg
  - Außeregg, Feistritz, Pacher
- Thannhausen
  - Alterilz, Grub, Landscha bei Weiz, Oberdorf bei Thannhausen, Oberfladnitz-Thannhausen, Peesen, Ponigl, Raas, Trennstein
- Ungerdorf
- Unterfladnitz
  - Arndorf bei Sankt Ruprecht an der Raab, Dietmannsdorf, Kühwiesen, Neudorf bei Sankt Ruprecht an der Raab, Wollsdorf
- Waisenegg
  - Piregg
- Weiz
