= Hohenau an der Raab =

- Former municipality
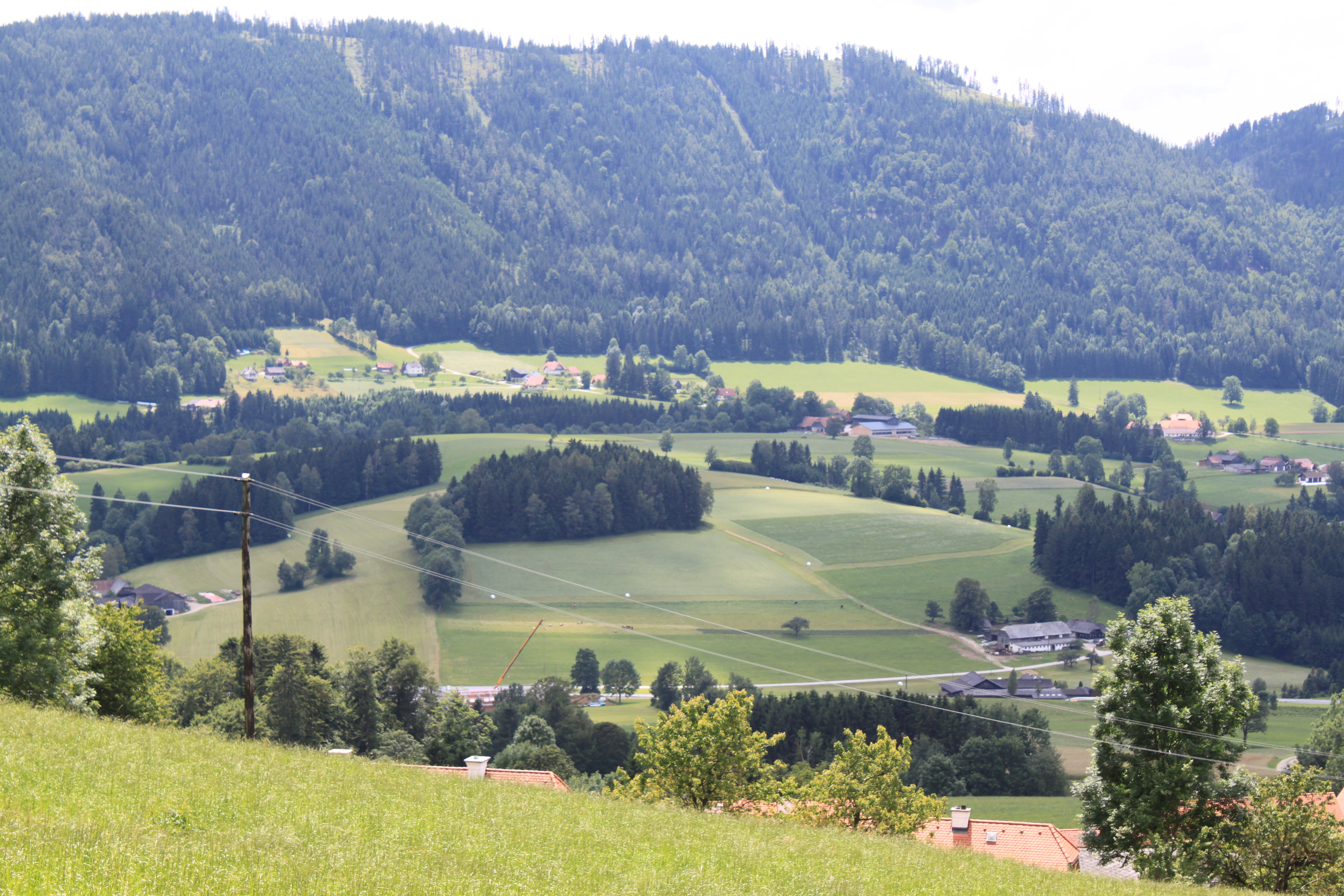
- Haufenreith (part of Hohenau)

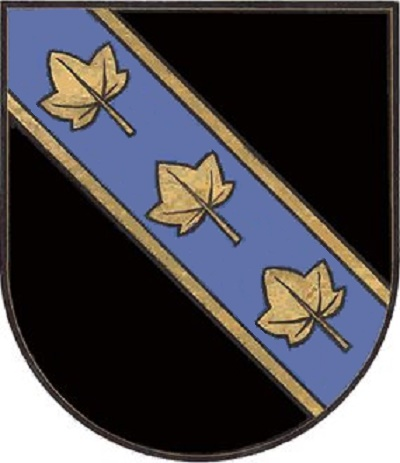
- Coat of arms

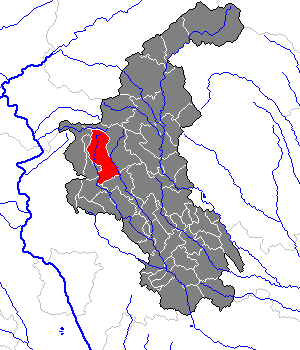
- Location within Weiz district

- Location within Austria
- Coordinates: 47°18′00″N 15°33′00″E
- Country: Austria
- State: Styria
- District: Weiz

Area
  - Total: 37.8 km^{2} (14.6 sq mi)
- Elevation: 680 m (2,230 ft)

Population (1 January 2016)
  - Total: 1,331
  - Density: 35.2/km^{2} (91.2/sq mi)
- Time zone: UTC+1 (CET)
  - Summer (DST): UTC+2 (CEST)
- Postal code: 8162
- Area code: 03179
- Vehicle registration: WZ
- Website: www.hohenau-raab.steiermark.at

Hohenau an der Raab is a former municipality in the district of Weiz in the Austrian state of Styria. Since the 2015 Styria municipal structural reform, it is part of the municipality Passail.

== Geography ==
Hohenau an der Raab is located in the east of Styria.

The highest point is the Siebenkögel at 1409 m in the north.
