= Elfriede Hammerl =

Austrian journalist

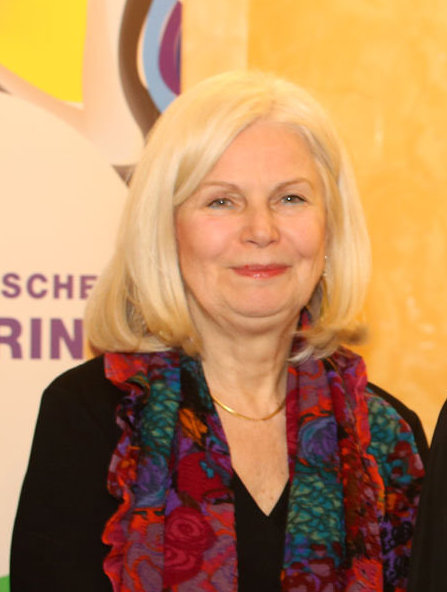
Elfriede Hammerl (2015)

Elfriede Hammerl (born 29 April 1945) is an Austrian journalist and writer from Gumpoldskirchen, near Vienna.

== Life ==
Born in Prebensdorf, Steiermark, Hammerl studied German and theatre studies at the University of Vienna and began her career as a journalist at the Neues Österreich.

She has written and continues to write columns for a wide variety of newspapers, journals and magazines (including for Kurier, Stern, Profil, Vogue, and Cosmopolitan).

She has also written plays, cabaret texts, short stories, screenplays and novels.

Hammerl was a co-initiator of the Austrian women's referendum in April 1997, she stood as a candidate in the 1999 Austrian legislative election for the Liberal Forum and was a member of the non-university advisory board of the University of Innsbruck from 2000 to 2002.

== Awards ==
- 1999 Preis der Stadt Wien für Publizistik
- 2002 Wiener Frauenpreis
- 2003 Concordia-Preis in the Human Rights category
- 2006 Ehrenzeichen für Verdienste um das Land Wien
- 2006 Medienlöwin
- 2011 Kurt-Vorhofer-Preis
- 2011 Berufstitel Professor.
- 2015 Frauenring-Preis.
- 2016 Decoration of Honour for Services to the Republic of Austria.
- 2016 Österreichischer Journalist des Jahres – Award for her life's work.
- 2017 Käthe Leichter Prize of the Federal Ministry of Health and Women.
- 2018 Concordia-Preis for her life's work.

== Works ==
- Das muss gesagt werden Kolumnen. Kremayr & Scheriau 2020, ISBN 978-3-218-01235-5
- Alte Geschichten: Erzählungen. Kremayr & Scheriau 2018, ISBN 978-3-218-01106-8
- Von Liebe und Einsamkeit. Kremayr & Scheriau 2016, ISBN 978-3-218-01022-1
- Hotel Mama – Nesthocker, Nervensägen und Neurosen. Zsolnay 2007, ISBN 3-552-06066-9
- Müde bin ich Känguru – Leben in der Patchwork-Familie. Zsolnay 2006, ISBN 3-552-06017-0
- Der verpasste Mann. Deuticke 2004, ISBN 978-3216307194
- Wunderbare Valerie. Deuticke 2003, ISBN 3-216-30674-7
- Mausi oder Das Leben ist ungerecht. Deuticke 2002; TB Piper ISBN 978-3492239530
- Steile Typen im Supermarkt / oder Die Hausfrau braucht Herausforderungen. Ueberreuter 1998
- Hunde – Kleine Philosophie der Passionen. dtv 1997, ISBN 978-3423200370
- Schuldgefühle sind schön. Beobachtungen des Katers Ferdinand. 1992; Neuauflage Deuticke 2003, ISBN 3-216-30680-1
