= Neudorf bei Passail =

- Former municipality
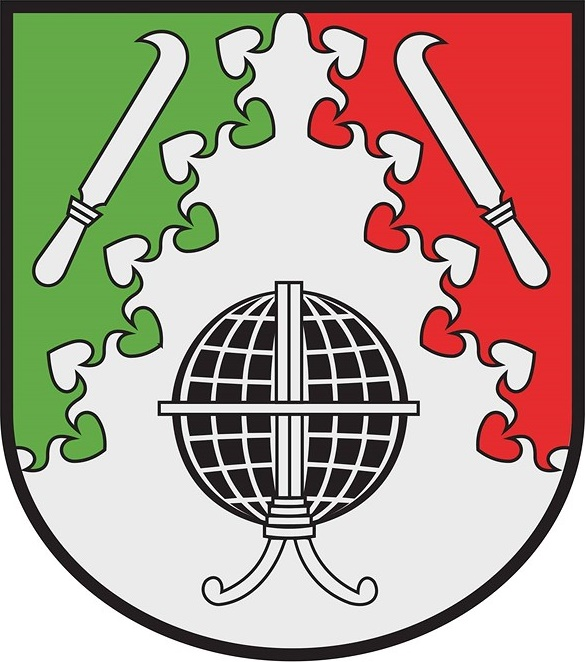
- Coat of arms

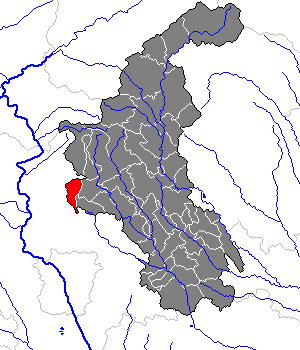
- Location within Weiz district

- Location within Austria
- Coordinates: 47°13′48″N 15°27′00″E
- Country: Austria
- State: Styria
- District: Weiz

Area
  - Total: 12.71 km^{2} (4.91 sq mi)
- Elevation: 710 m (2,330 ft)

Population (1 January 2016)
  - Total: 480
  - Density: 38/km^{2} (98/sq mi)
- Time zone: UTC+1 (CET)
  - Summer (DST): UTC+2 (CEST)
- Postal code: 8102, 8162
- Area code: 03179
- Vehicle registration: WZ
- Website: www.neudorf-passail.steiermark.at

Neudorf bei Passail is a former municipality in the district of Weiz in the Austrian state of Styria. Since the 2015 Styria municipal structural reform, it is part of the municipality Passail.
