= Labuch =

- Former municipality
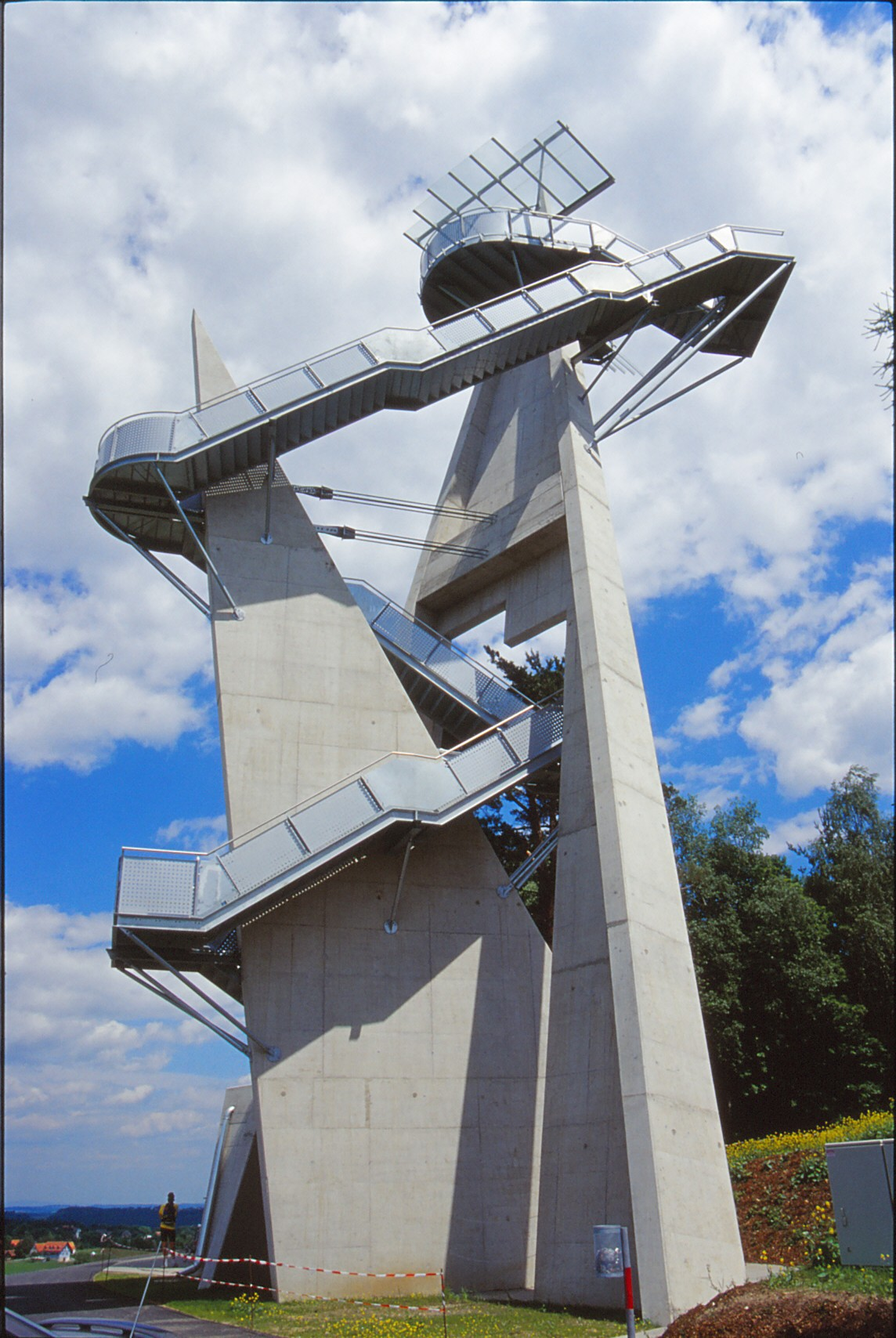
- Observation tower in Labuch

- Coat of arms

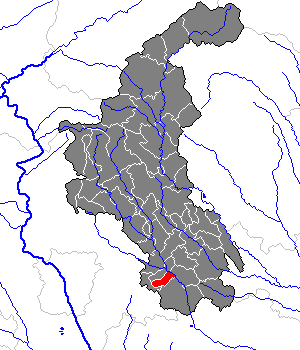
- Location within Weiz district

- Location within Austria
- Coordinates: 47°03′36″N 15°39′36″E
- Country: Austria
- State: Styria
- District: Weiz

Area
  - Total: 6.9 km^{2} (2.7 sq mi)
- Elevation: 400 m (1,300 ft)

Population (1 January 2016)
  - Total: 809
  - Density: 120/km^{2} (300/sq mi)
- Time zone: UTC+1 (CET)
  - Summer (DST): UTC+2 (CEST)
- Postal code: 8200
- Area code: 03112
- Vehicle registration: WZ
- Website: www.labuch.steiermark.at

Labuch is a former municipality in the district of Weiz in the Austrian state of Styria. Since the 2015 Styria municipal structural reform, it is part of the municipality Gleisdorf.
