= Sankt Kathrein am Offenegg =

- Municipality
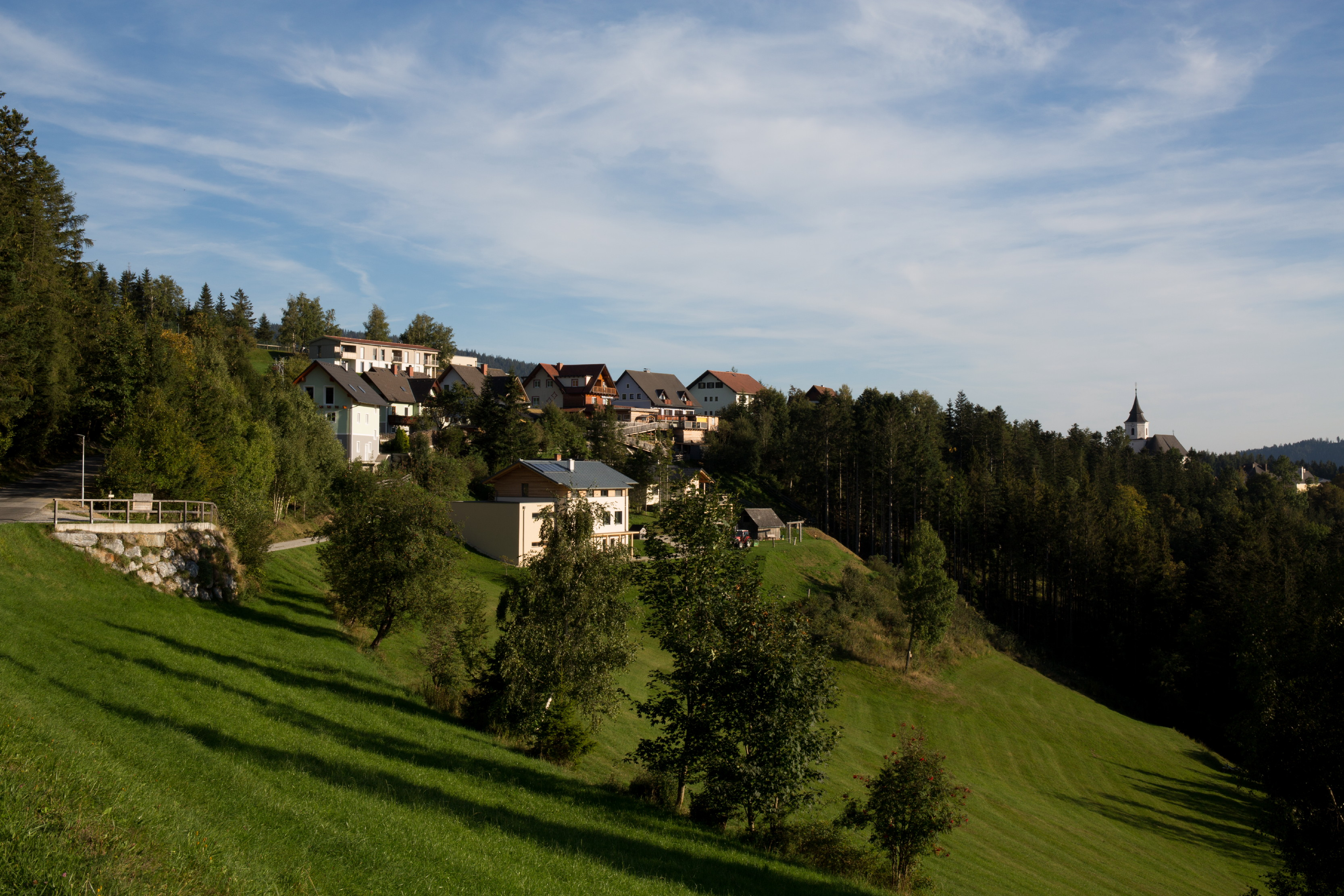

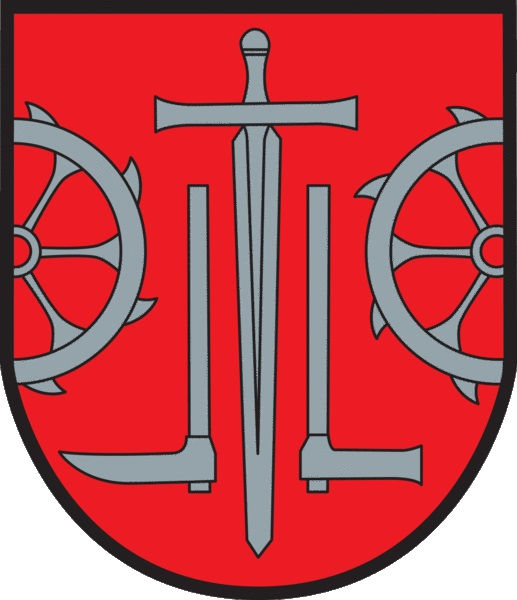
- Coat of arms

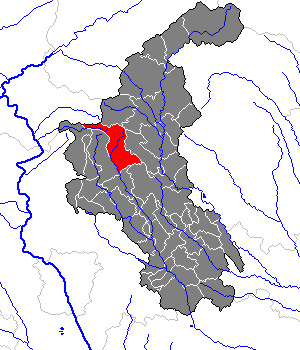
- Location within Weiz district

- Location within Austria
- Coordinates: 47°17′58″N 15°34′36″E
- Country: Austria
- State: Styria
- District: Weiz

Government
  - Mayor: Thomas Derler (ÖVP)

Area
  - Total: 40.34 km^{2} (15.58 sq mi)
- Elevation: 972 m (3,189 ft)

Population (2018-01-01)
  - Total: 1,086
  - Density: 26.92/km^{2} (69.73/sq mi)
- Time zone: UTC+1 (CET)
  - Summer (DST): UTC+2 (CEST)
- Postal code: 8171
- Area code: 03179
- Vehicle registration: WZ
- Website: www.st-kathrein.at

Sankt Kathrein am Offenegg is a municipality in the district of Weiz in the Austrian state of Styria.

== Geography ==
The municipality lies on the eastern edge of the Passail basin in the Graz hills.
