= Strallegg =

- Municipality
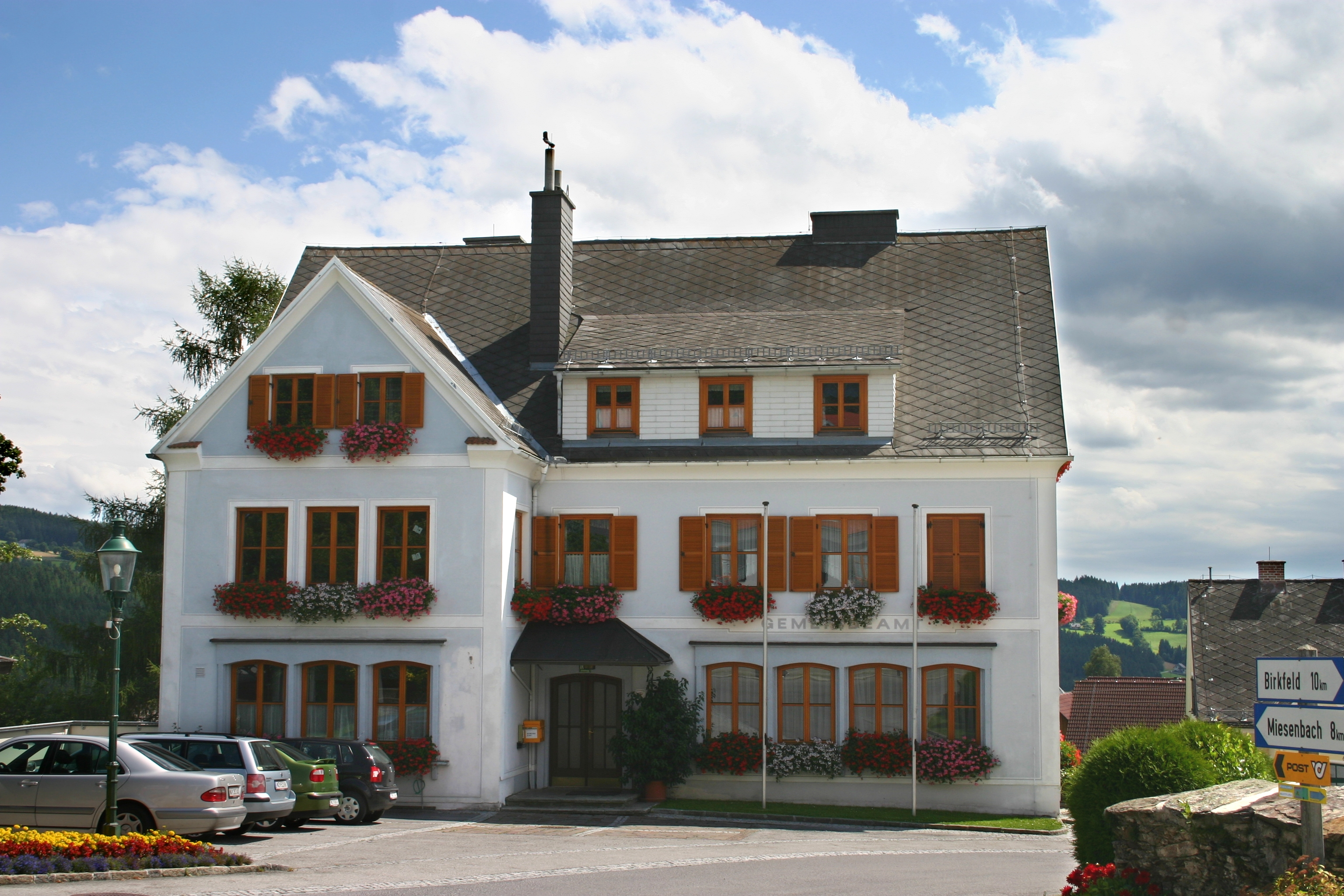
- Strallegg town hall

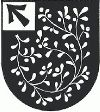
- Coat of arms

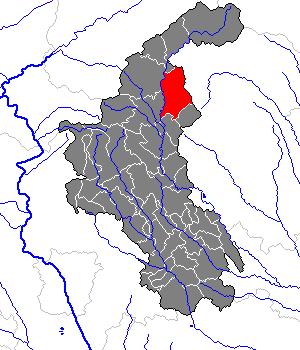
- Location within Weiz district

- Location within Austria
- Coordinates: 47°24′00″N 15°42′36″E
- Country: Austria
- State: Styria
- District: Weiz

Government
  - Mayor: Anita Feiner (ÖVP)

Area
  - Total: 41.99 km^{2} (16.21 sq mi)
- Elevation: 850 m (2,790 ft)

Population (2018-01-01)
  - Total: 1,925
  - Density: 45.84/km^{2} (118.7/sq mi)
- Time zone: UTC+1 (CET)
  - Summer (DST): UTC+2 (CEST)
- Postal code: 8190, 8192
- Area code: 03174
- Vehicle registration: WZ
- Website: www.strallegg.eu

Strallegg is a municipality in the district of Weiz in the Austrian state of Styria.

== Geography ==
Strallegg lies in the east Styrian hills.

=== Structure ===
The municipal area of Strallegg consists of the following four subdivisions:

- Außeregg
- Feistritz
- Pacher
- Strallegg

== Etymology ==
The name of the municipality, Strallegg, most likely derives from two words: "Strall" and "Egg". In this case, "Strall" corresponds to the modern German "Strahl", while "Egg" refers to "Eck". Therefore, in modern German, it would be called "Strahlendes Eck", meaning "Shining Corner".
