= Koglhof =

- Former municipality
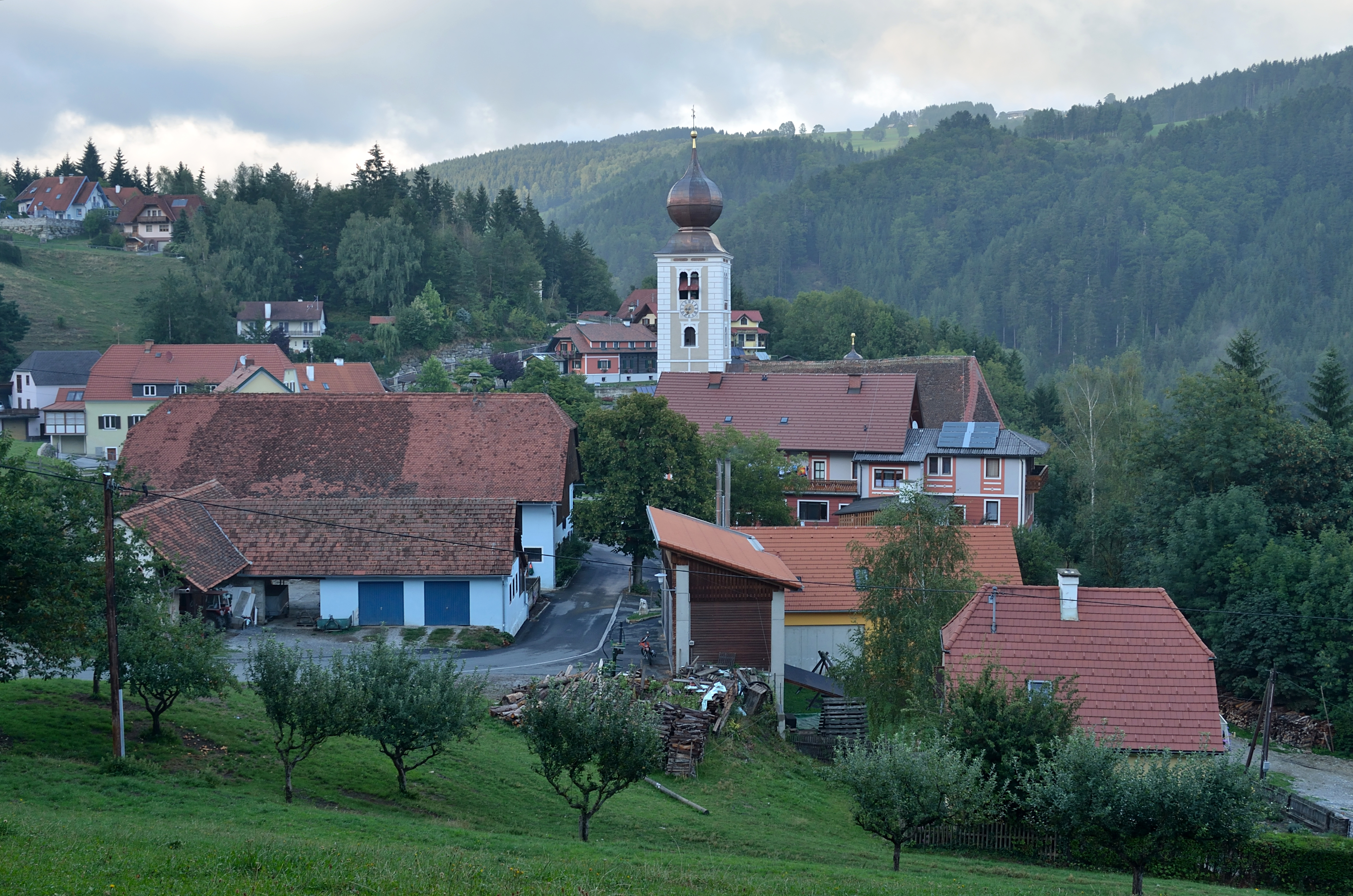
- View of Koglhof

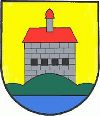
- Coat of arms

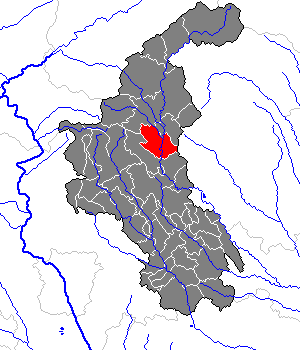
- Location within Weiz district

- Location within Austria
- Coordinates: 47°19′11″N 15°41′25″E
- Country: Austria
- State: Styria
- District: Weiz

Area
  - Total: 30.29 km^{2} (11.70 sq mi)
- Elevation: 600 m (2,000 ft)

Population (1 January 2016)
  - Total: 1,094
  - Density: 36.12/km^{2} (93.54/sq mi)
- Time zone: UTC+1 (CET)
  - Summer (DST): UTC+2 (CEST)
- Postal code: 8191
- Area code: 03174
- Vehicle registration: WZ
- Website: www.koglhof.at

Koglhof is a former municipality in the district of Weiz in the Austrian state of Styria. Since the 2015 Styria municipal structural reform, it is part of the municipality Birkfeld.
