= Sankt Kathrein am Hauenstein =

St. Kathrein am Hauenstein
- Municipality
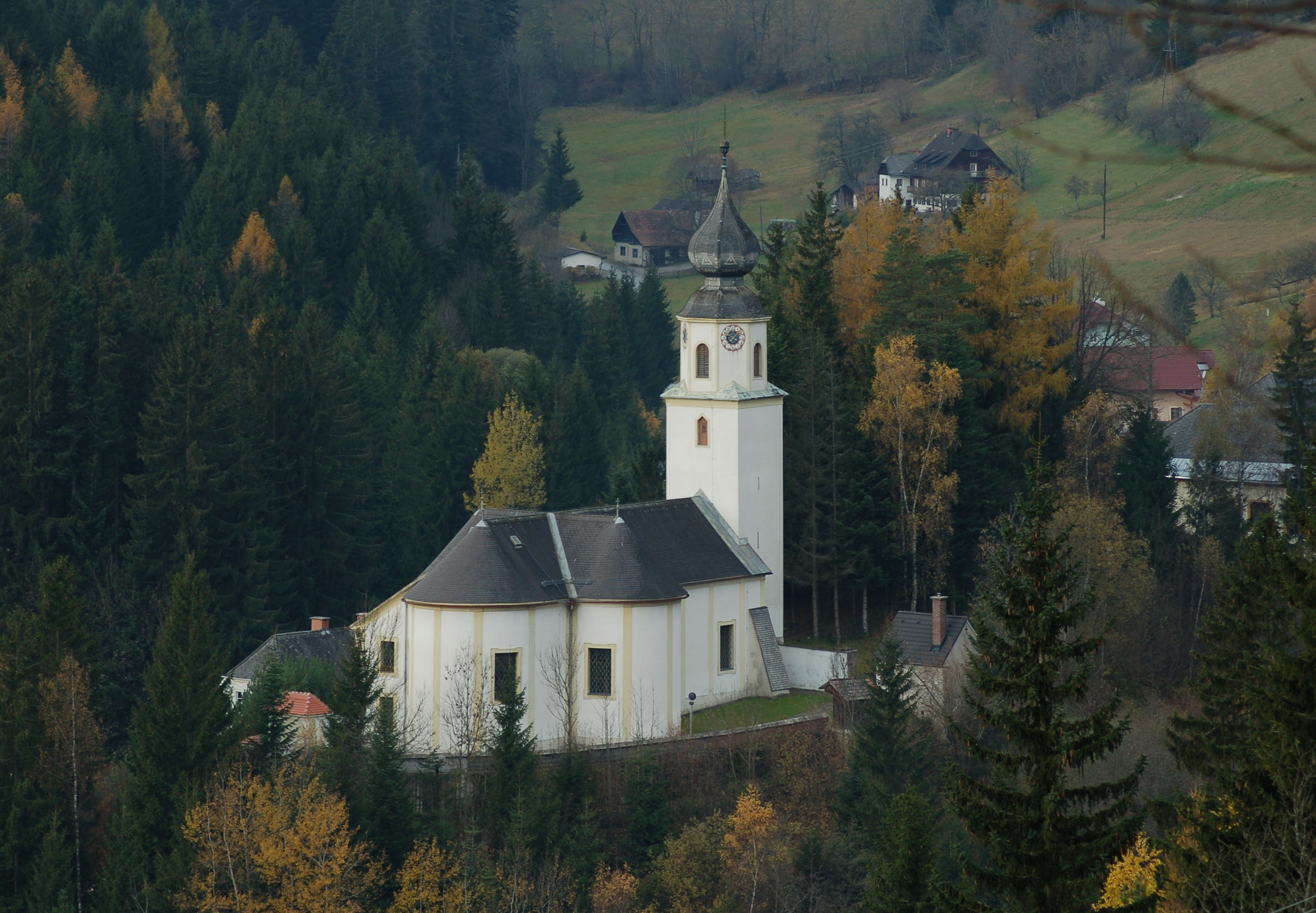
- Sankt Kathrein am Hauenstein parish church

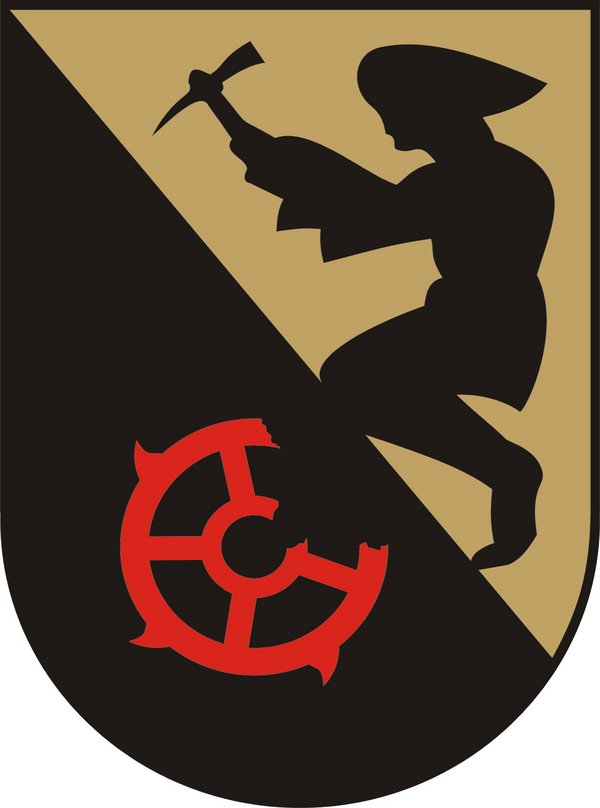
- Coat of arms

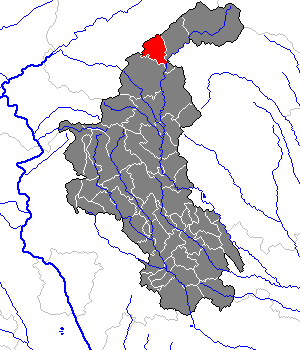
- Location within Weiz district

- Location within Austria
- Coordinates: 47°29′22″N 15°41′38″E
- Country: Austria
- State: Styria
- District: Weiz

Government
  - Mayor: Peter Knöbelreiter (ÖVP)

Area
  - Total: 19.25 km^{2} (7.43 sq mi)
- Elevation: 822 m (2,697 ft)

Population (2018-01-01)
  - Total: 633
  - Density: 32.9/km^{2} (85.2/sq mi)
- Time zone: UTC+1 (CET)
  - Summer (DST): UTC+2 (CEST)
- Postal code: 8672
- Area code: +43 3173
- Vehicle registration: WZ
- Website: www.st-kathrein-hauenstein.at

Sankt Kathrein am Hauenstein is a municipality in the district of Weiz in the Austrian state of Styria.

== Geography ==
The municipality lies in the valley of the Hirschbach, a tributary of the Feistritz, in the Fischbach Alps.
