= Haslau bei Birkfeld =

- Former municipality
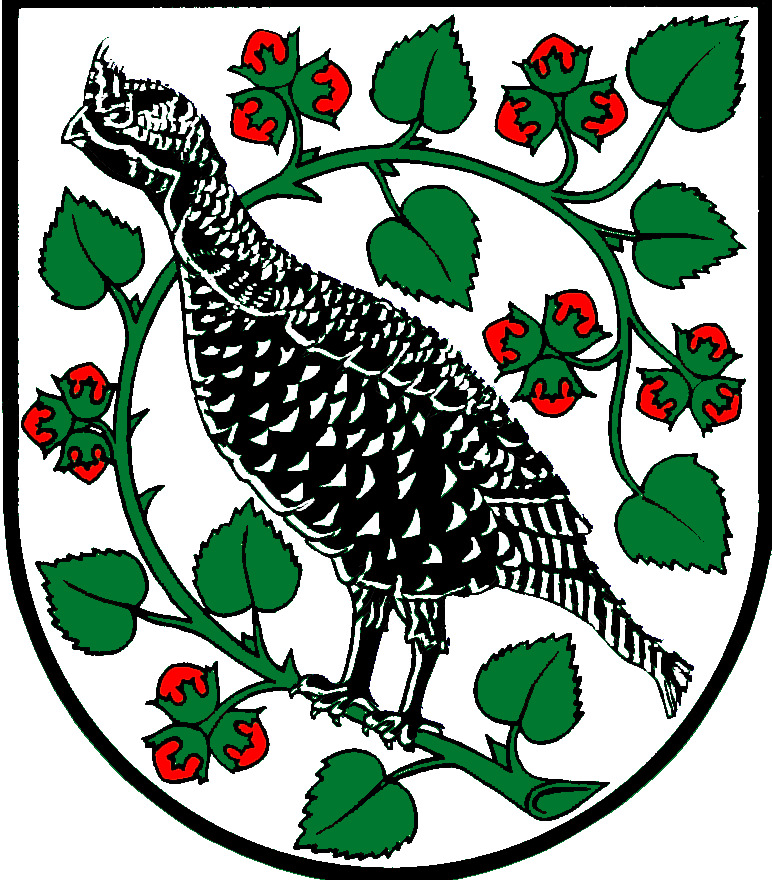
- Coat of arms

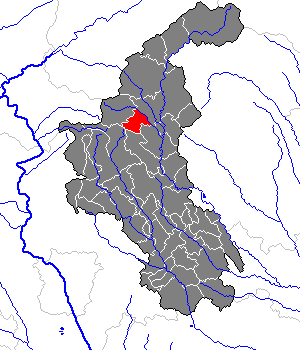
- Location within Weiz district

- Location within Austria
- Coordinates: 47°21′00″N 15°40′00″E
- Country: Austria
- State: Styria
- District: Weiz

Area
  - Total: 14.01 km^{2} (5.41 sq mi)
- Elevation: 639 m (2,096 ft)

Population (1 January 2016)
  - Total: 440
  - Density: 31/km^{2} (81/sq mi)
- Time zone: UTC+1 (CET)
  - Summer (DST): UTC+2 (CEST)
- Postal code: 8190
- Area code: 03174
- Vehicle registration: WZ
- Website: www.haslau-birkfeld.steiermark.at

Haslau bei Birkfeld is a former municipality in the district of Weiz in the Austrian state of Styria. Since the 2015 Styria municipal structural reform, it is part of the municipality Birkfeld.
