= Gasen =

- Municipality
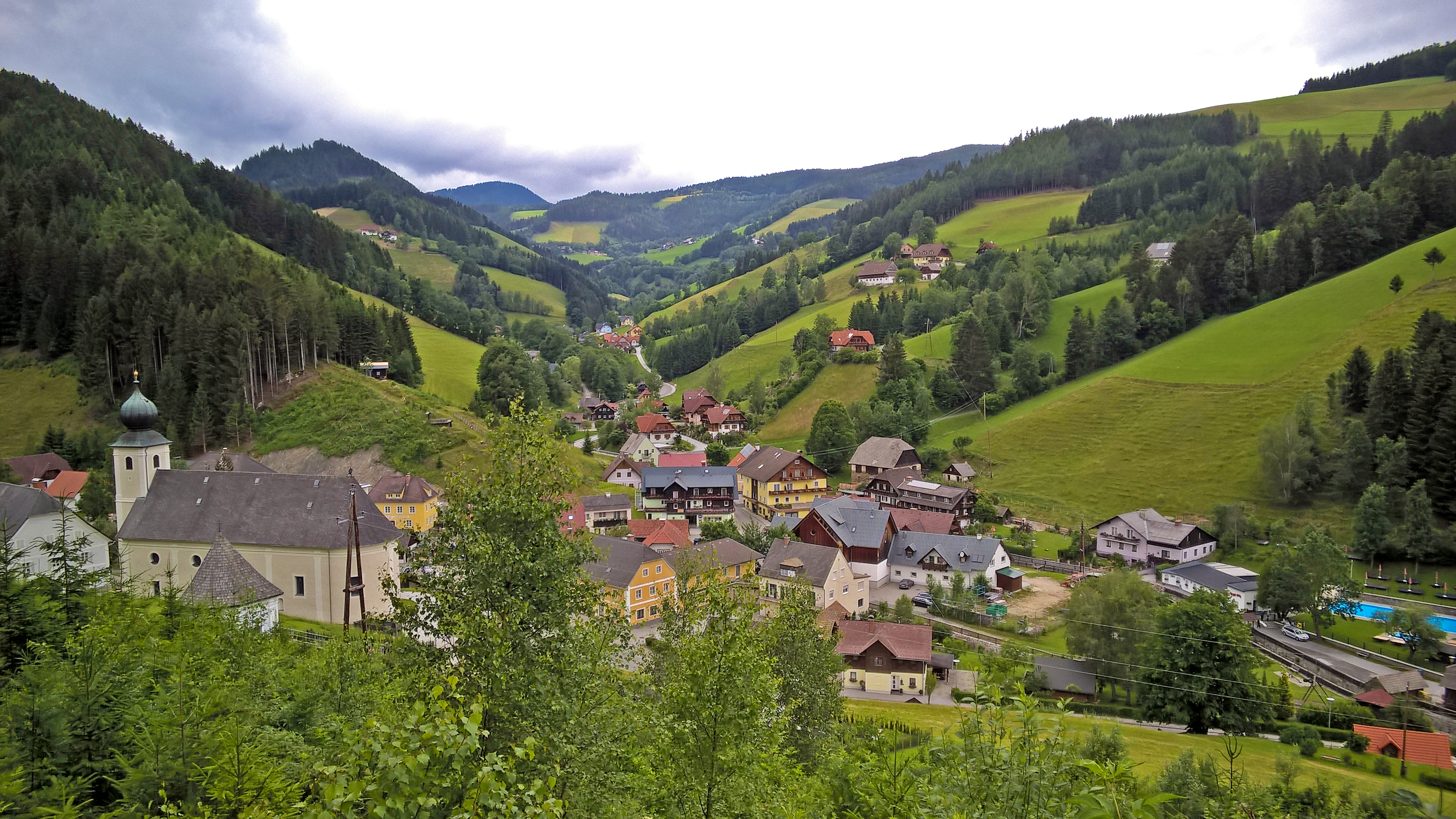
- View of Gasen

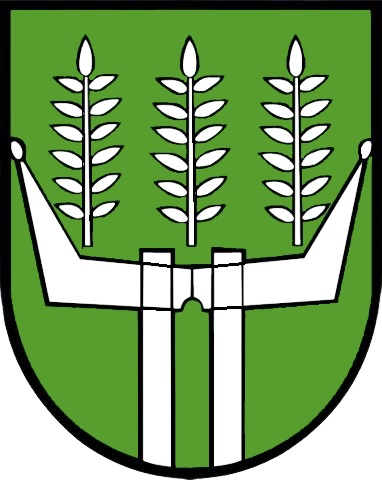
- Coat of arms

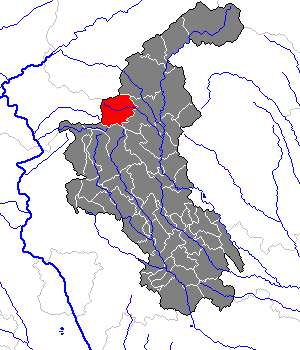
- Location within Weiz district

- Location within Austria
- Coordinates: 47°22′59″N 15°33′58″E
- Country: Austria
- State: Styria
- District: Weiz

Government
  - Mayor: Erwin Gruber (ÖVP)

Area
  - Total: 33.95 km^{2} (13.11 sq mi)
- Elevation: 800 m (2,600 ft)

Population (2018-01-01)
  - Total: 915
  - Density: 27.0/km^{2} (69.8/sq mi)
- Time zone: UTC+1 (CET)
  - Summer (DST): UTC+2 (CEST)
- Postal code: 8616
- Area code: 03171
- Vehicle registration: WZ
- Website: www.gasen.at

Gasen is a municipality in the district of Weiz in the Austrian state of Styria.
