= Waisenegg =

- Former municipality
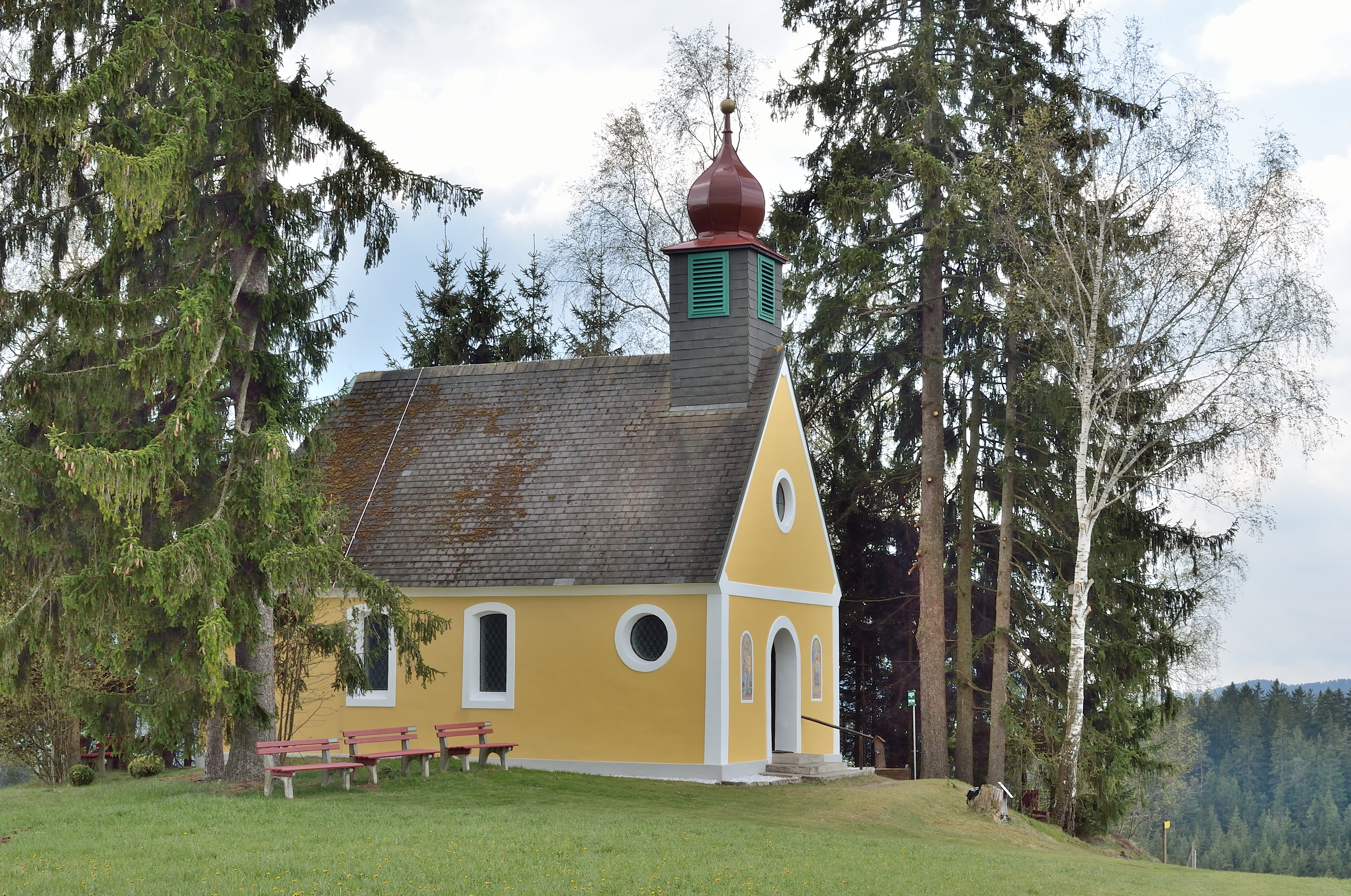
- Chapel in Waisenegg

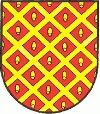
- Coat of arms

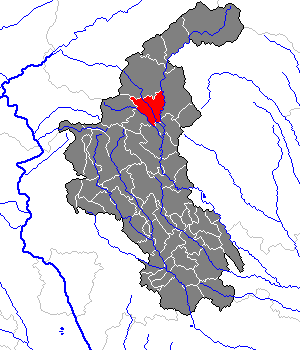
- Location within Weiz district

- Location within Austria
- Coordinates: 47°23′39″N 15°41′02″E
- Country: Austria
- State: Styria
- District: Weiz

Area
  - Total: 26.04 km^{2} (10.05 sq mi)
- Elevation: 747 m (2,451 ft)

Population (1 January 2016)
  - Total: 1,065
  - Density: 40.90/km^{2} (105.9/sq mi)
- Time zone: UTC+1 (CET)
  - Summer (DST): UTC+2 (CEST)
- Postal code: 8190
- Area code: 03174
- Vehicle registration: WZ
- Website: www.waisenegg.at

Waisenegg is a former municipality in the district of Weiz in the Austrian state of Styria. Since the 2015 Styria municipal structural reform, it is part of the municipality Birkfeld.
