= Baierdorf bei Anger =

- Former municipality
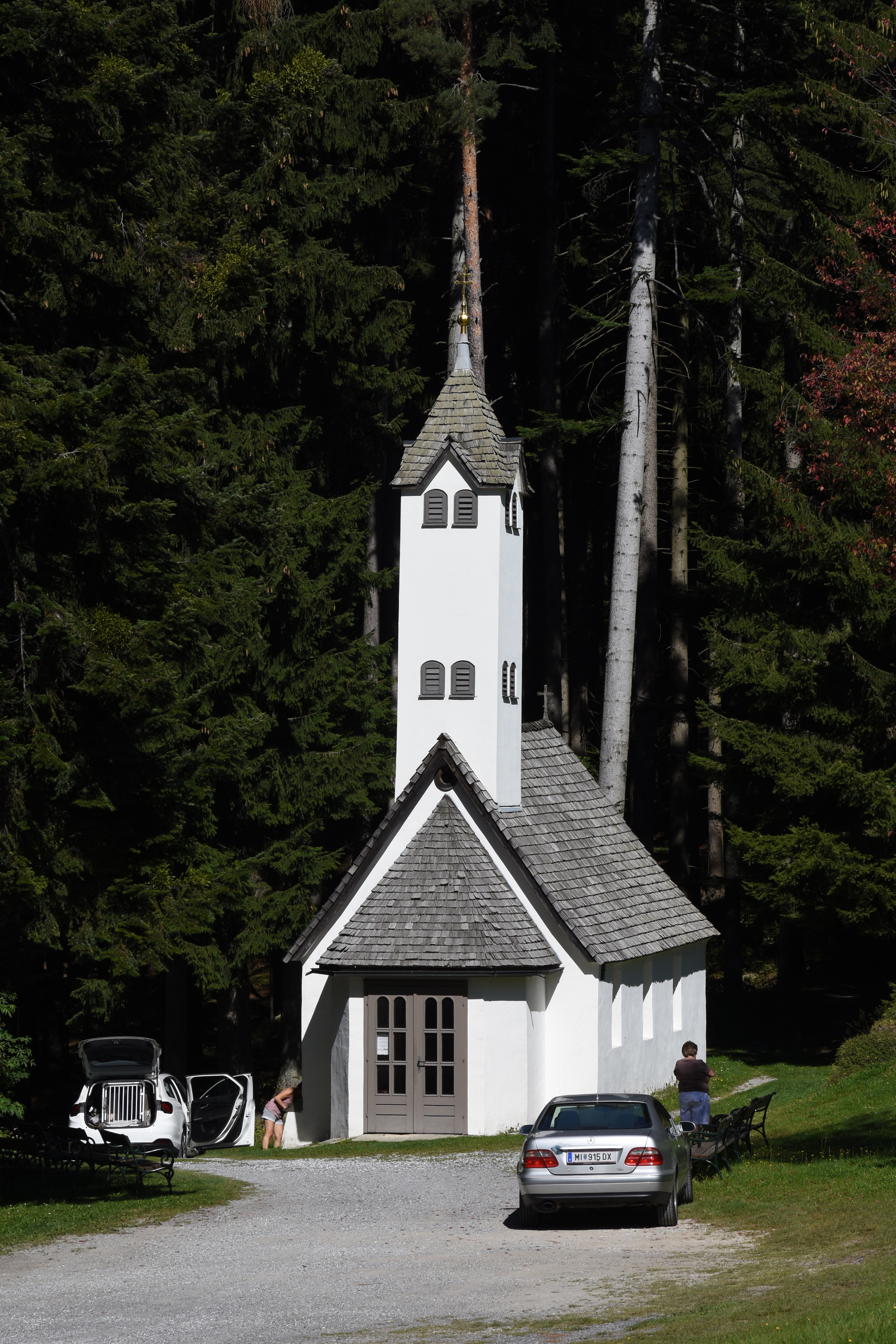
- Chapel in Baierdorf bei Anger

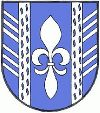
- Coat of arms

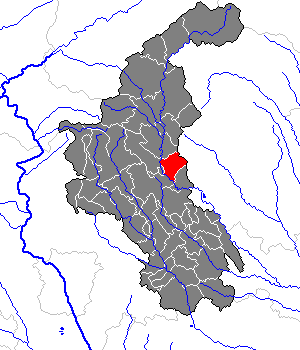
- Location within Weiz district

- Location within Austria
- Coordinates: 47°17′00″N 15°42′00″E
- Country: Austria
- State: Styria
- District: Weiz

Area
  - Total: 16.31 km^{2} (6.30 sq mi)
- Elevation: 445–1,280 m (1,460–4,199 ft)

Population (1 January 2016)
  - Total: 1,632
  - Density: 100.1/km^{2} (259.2/sq mi)
- Time zone: UTC+1 (CET)
  - Summer (DST): UTC+2 (CEST)
- Postal code: 8184
- Area code: 03175
- Vehicle registration: WZ
- Website: www.baierdorf-anger.at

Baierdorf bei Anger is a former municipality in the district of Weiz in the Austrian state of Styria. Since the 2015 Styria municipal structural reform, it is part of the municipality Anger.
