= Nitscha =

- Former municipality
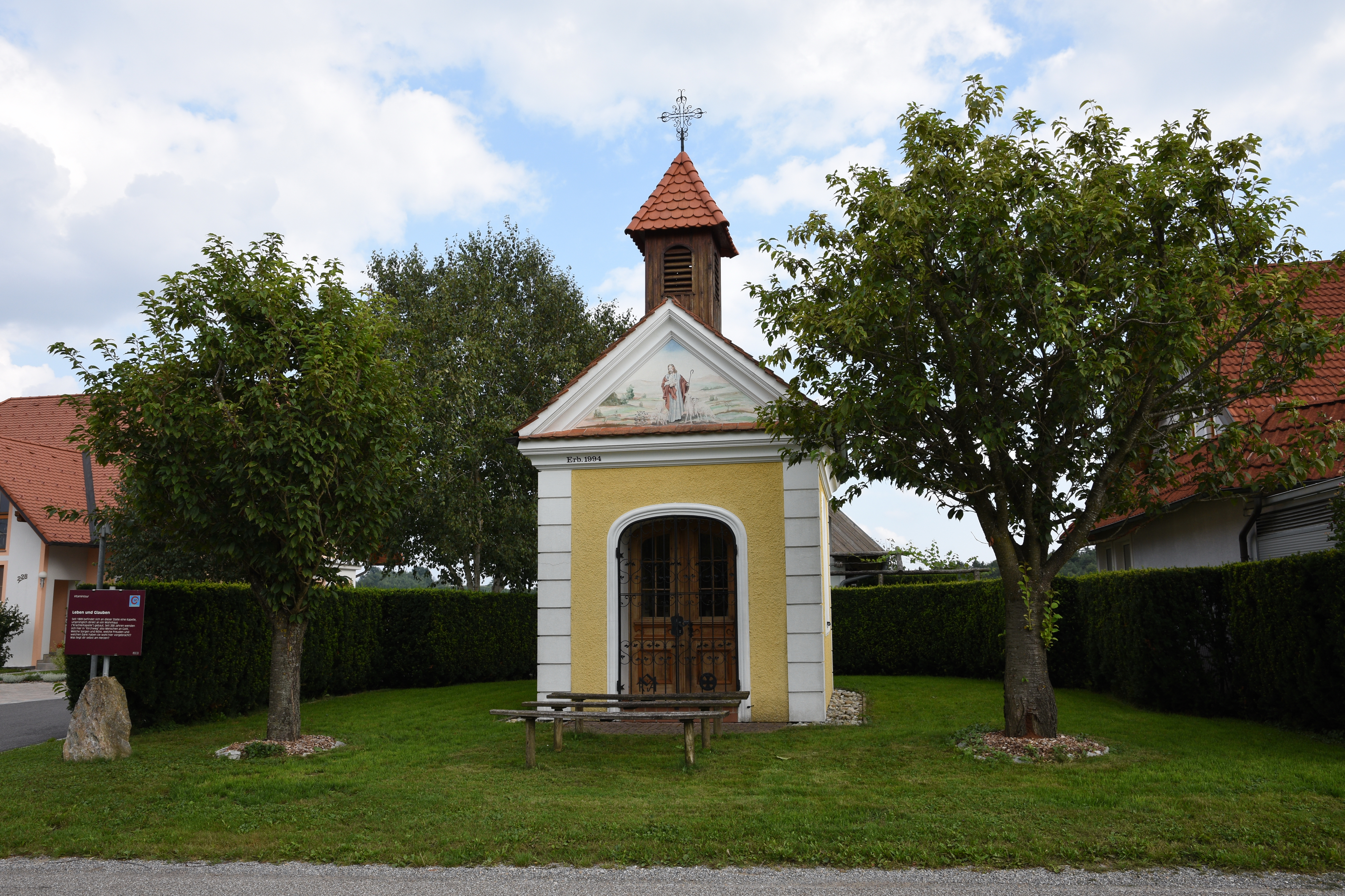
- Chapel in Nitscha

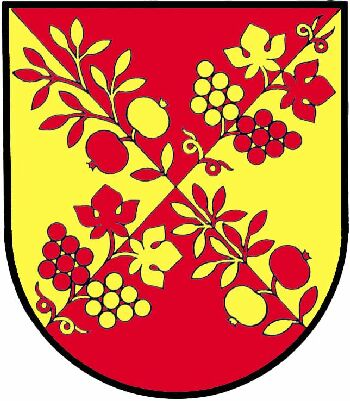
- Coat of arms

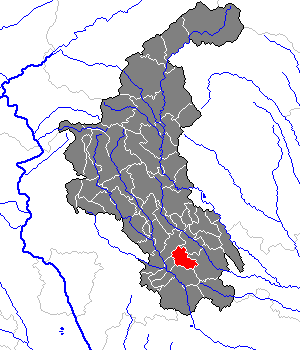
- Location within Weiz district

- Location within Austria
- Coordinates: 47°06′10″N 15°43′10″E
- Country: Austria
- State: Styria
- District: Weiz

Area
  - Total: 14.12 km^{2} (5.45 sq mi)
- Elevation: 359 m (1,178 ft)

Population (1 January 2016)
  - Total: 1,453
  - Density: 102.9/km^{2} (266.5/sq mi)
- Time zone: UTC+1 (CET)
  - Summer (DST): UTC+2 (CEST)
- Postal code: 8200
- Area code: 03112
- Vehicle registration: WZ
- Website: www.nitscha.at

Nitscha is a former municipality in the district of Weiz in the Austrian state of Styria. Since the 2015 Styria municipal structural reform, it is part of the municipality Gleisdorf.
