= Floing, Styria =

Floing
- Municipality
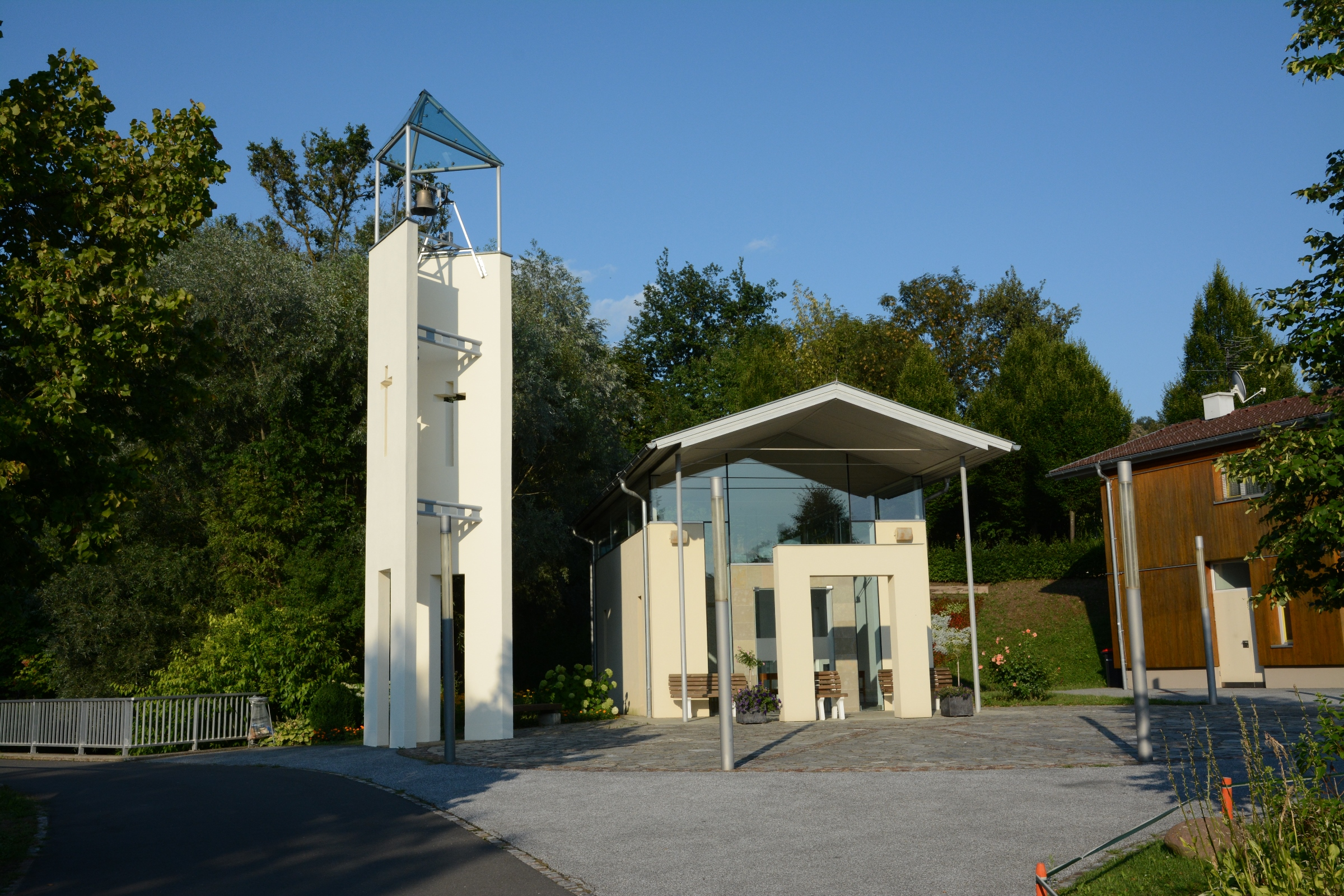
- Chapel in Floing

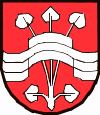
- Coat of arms

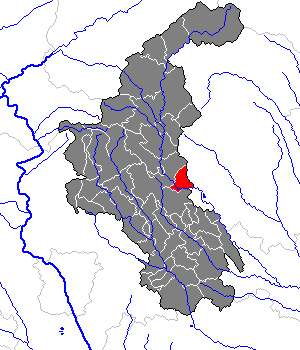
- Location within Weiz district

- Location within Austria
- Coordinates: 47°16′00″N 15°45′00″E
- Country: Austria
- State: Styria
- District: Weiz

Government
  - Mayor: Markus Gruber (ÖVP)

Area
  - Total: 13.29 km^{2} (5.13 sq mi)
- Elevation: 639 m (2,096 ft)

Population (2018-01-01)
  - Total: 1,195
  - Density: 89.92/km^{2} (232.9/sq mi)
- Time zone: UTC+1 (CET)
  - Summer (DST): UTC+2 (CEST)
- Postal code: 8183
- Area code: 03177
- Vehicle registration: WZ
- Website: www.floing.at

Floing is a municipality in the district of Weiz in the Austrian state of Styria.

== Geography ==
Floing lies in the eastern hills of Styria near the Raben forest.
