= Krottendorf =

- Former municipality
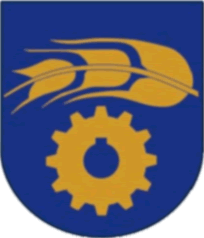
- Coat of arms

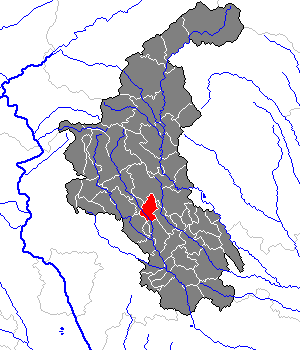
- Location within Weiz district

- Location within Austria
- Coordinates: 47°12′00″N 15°37′00″E
- Country: Austria
- State: Styria
- District: Weiz

Area
  - Total: 12.44 km^{2} (4.80 sq mi)
- Elevation: 435 m (1,427 ft)

Population (1 January 2016)
  - Total: 2,383
  - Density: 191.6/km^{2} (496.1/sq mi)
- Time zone: UTC+1 (CET)
  - Summer (DST): UTC+2 (CEST)
- Postal code: 8160
- Area code: 03172
- Vehicle registration: WZ
- Website: www.krottendorf.info

Krottendorf is a former municipality in the district of Weiz in the Austrian state of Styria. Since the 2015 Styria municipal structural reform, it is part of the municipality Weiz.
