= Ilztal =

- Municipality
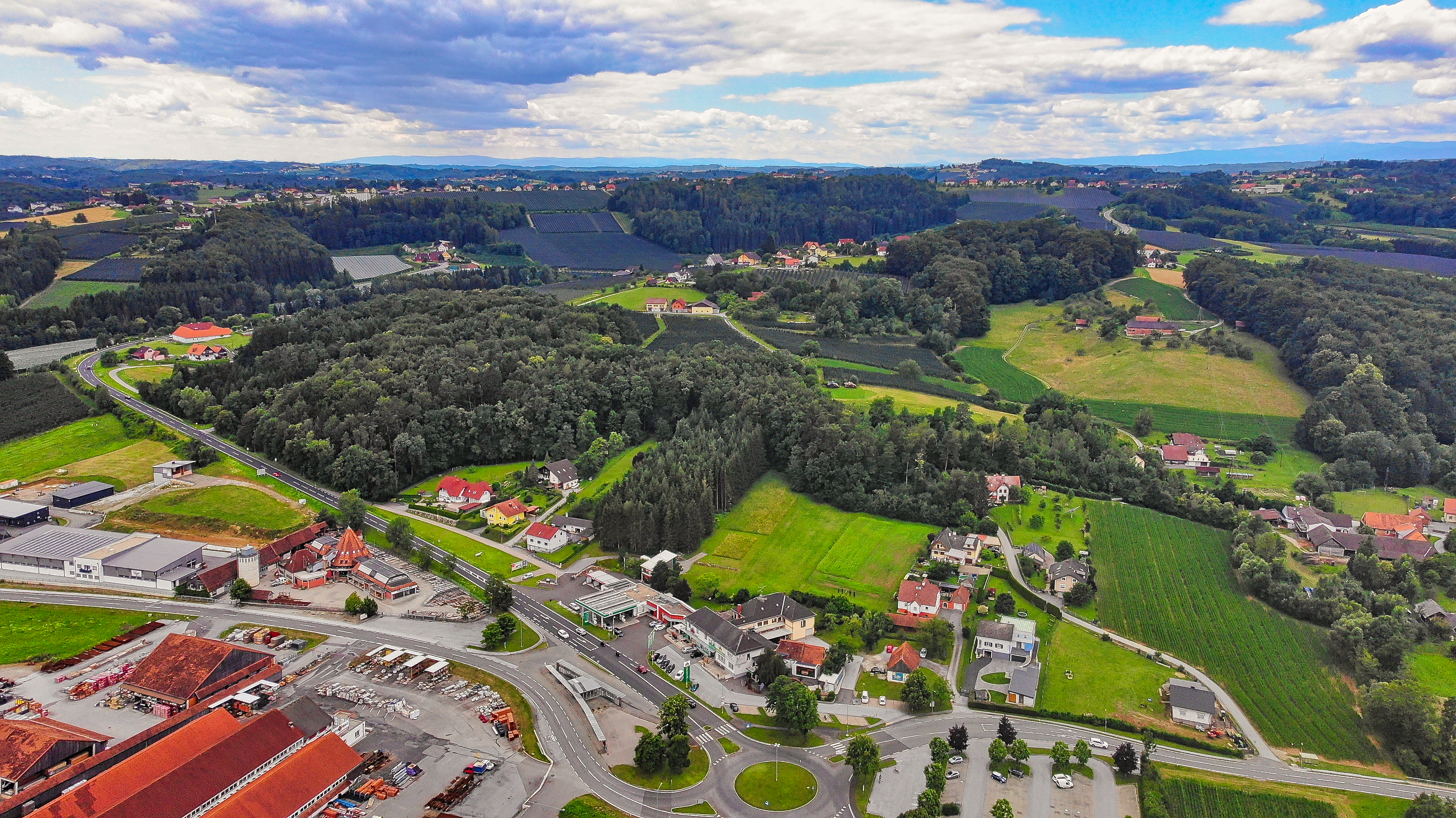
- Ilztal aerial view

- Coat of arms

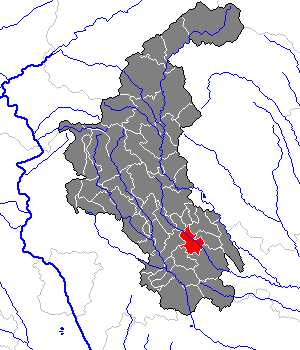
- Location within Weiz district

- Location within Austria
- Coordinates: 47°08′00″N 15°47′00″E
- Country: Austria
- State: Styria
- District: Weiz

Government
  - Mayor: Josef Schöngrundner (ÖVP)

Area
  - Total: 22.46 km^{2} (8.67 sq mi)
- Elevation: 330 m (1,080 ft)

Population (2018-01-01)
  - Total: 2,148
  - Density: 95.64/km^{2} (247.7/sq mi)
- Time zone: UTC+1 (CET)
  - Summer (DST): UTC+2 (CEST)
- Postal code: 8211
- Area code: 03112, 03113, 03118
- Vehicle registration: WZ
- Website: www.ilztal.steiermark.at

Ilztal is a municipality in the district of Weiz in the Austrian state of Styria. The journalist Elfriede Hammerl was born in the village in 1945.

== Geography ==
Ilztal lies about 20 km (12 mi) east of Graz and 10 km (6.2 mi) southeast of Weiz.
