= Miesenbach bei Birkfeld =

- Municipality
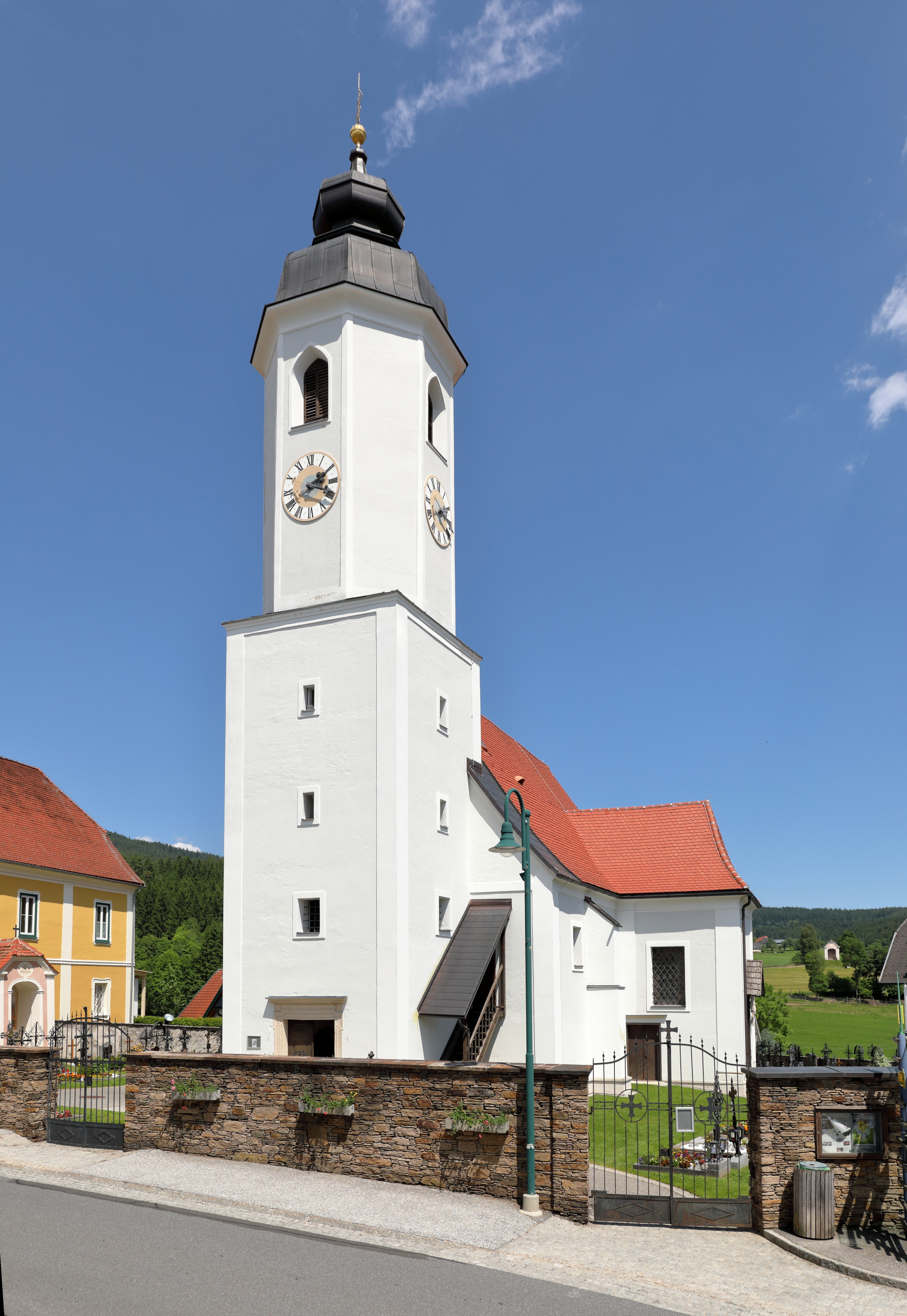
- Parish church of Miesenbach

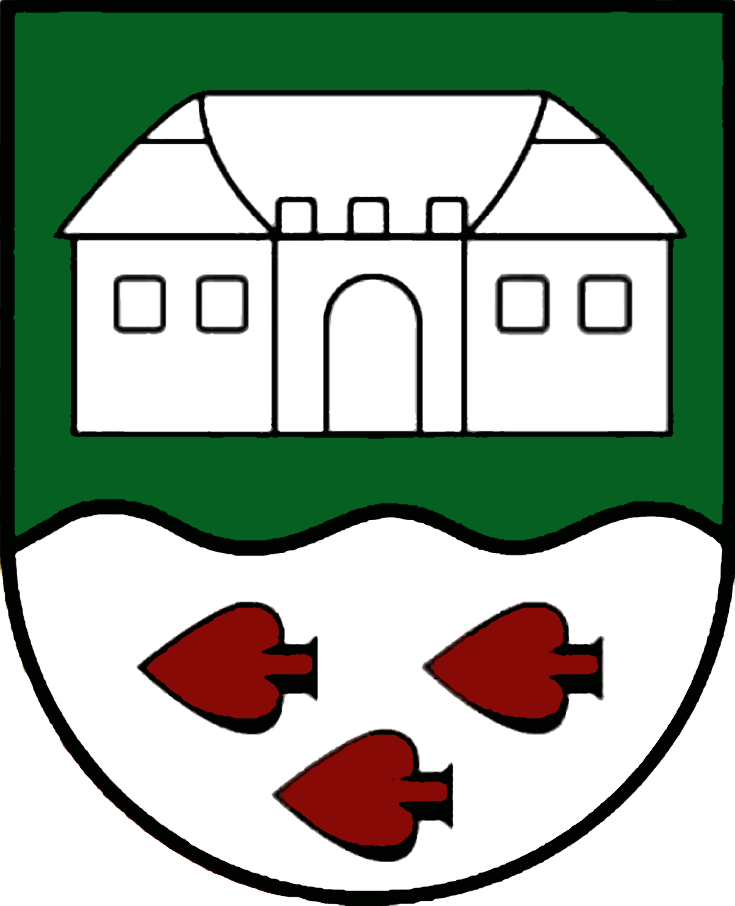
- Coat of arms

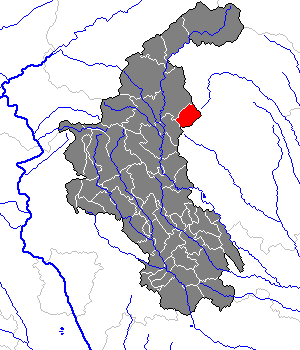
- Location within Weiz district

- Location within Austria
- Coordinates: 47°22′12″N 15°45′38″E
- Country: Austria
- State: Styria
- District: Weiz

Government
  - Mayor: Johann Sorger (ÖVP)

Area
  - Total: 14.62 km^{2} (5.64 sq mi)
- Elevation: 827 m (2,713 ft)

Population (2018-01-01)
  - Total: 696
  - Density: 47.6/km^{2} (123/sq mi)
- Time zone: UTC+1 (CET)
  - Summer (DST): UTC+2 (CEST)
- Postal code: 8190
- Area code: 03174
- Vehicle registration: WZ
- Website: www.miesenbach-birkfeld.steiermark.at

Miesenbach bei Birkfeld is a municipality in the district of Weiz in the Austrian state of Styria.
