= Gersdorf an der Feistritz =

- Municipality
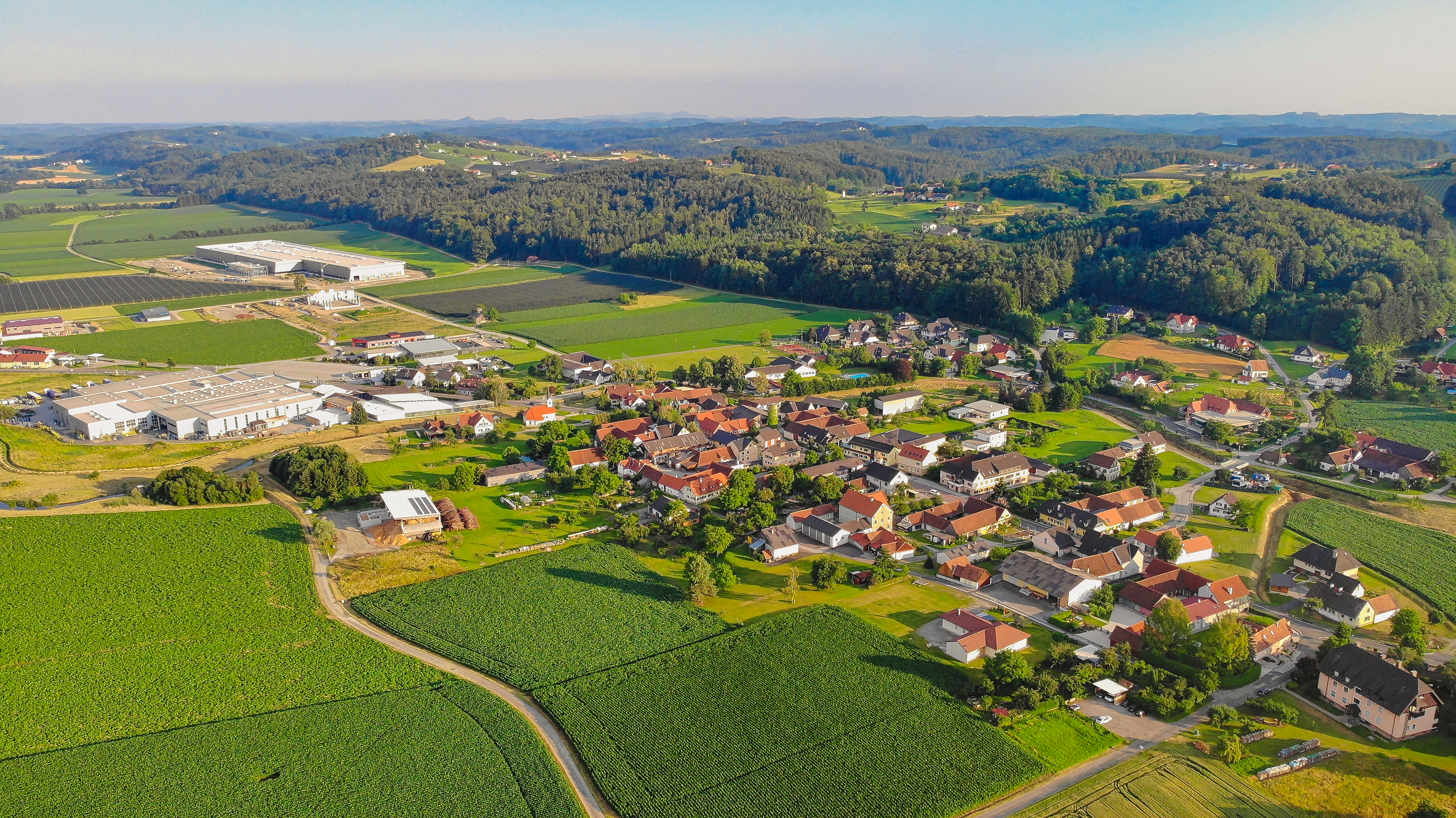
- Aerial view of Gersdorf

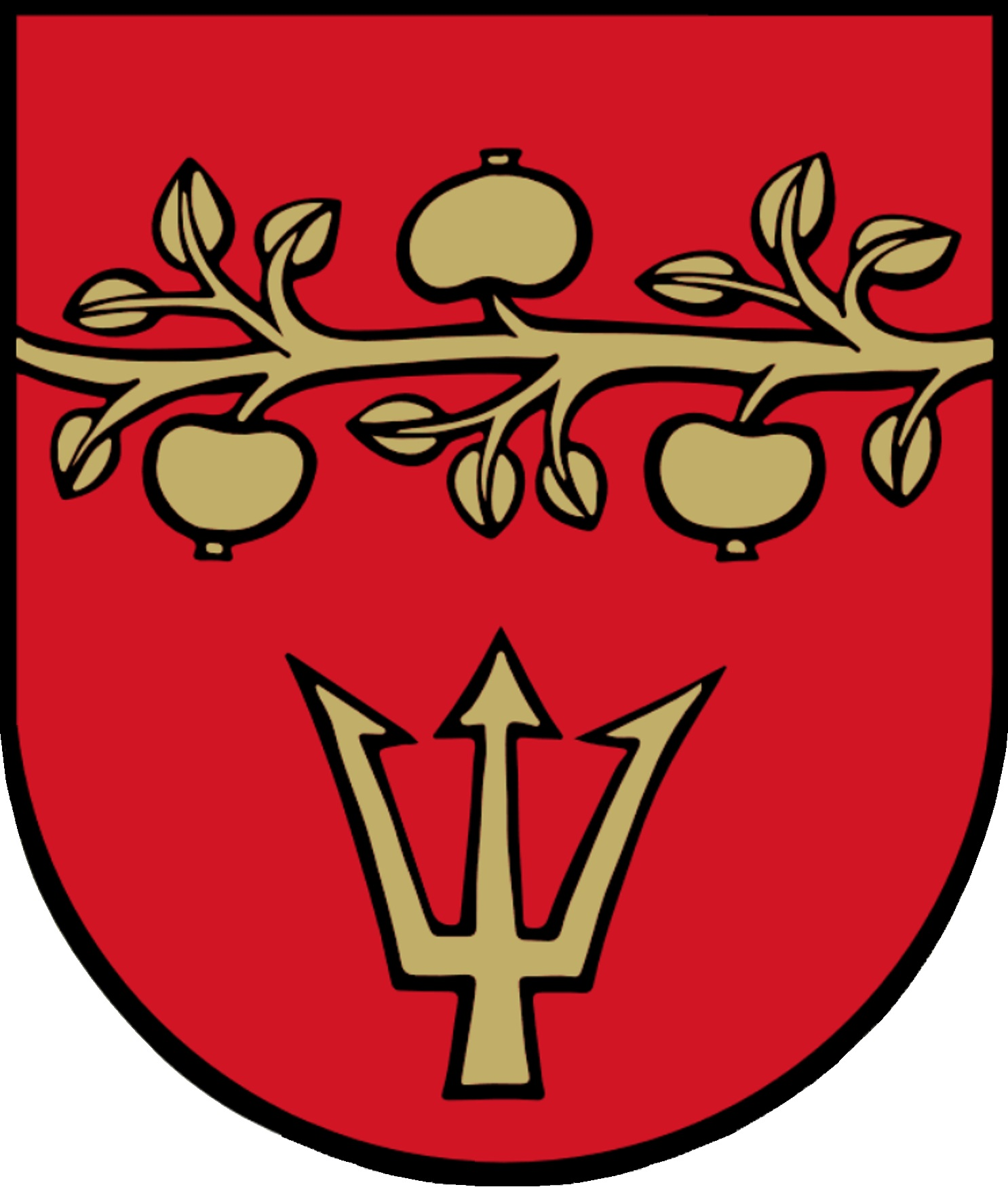
- Coat of arms

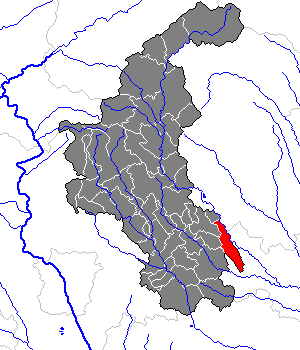
- Location within Weiz district

- Location within Austria
- Coordinates: 47°09′36″N 15°51′00″E
- Country: Austria
- State: Styria
- District: Weiz

Government
  - Mayor: Engelbert Strempfl (ÖVP)

Area
  - Total: 30.03 km^{2} (11.59 sq mi)
- Elevation: 333 m (1,093 ft)

Population (2018-01-01)
  - Total: 1,699
  - Density: 56.58/km^{2} (146.5/sq mi)
- Time zone: UTC+1 (CET)
  - Summer (DST): UTC+2 (CEST)
- Postal code: 8212
- Area code: 03113
- Vehicle registration: WZ
- Website: www.gersdorf.at

Gersdorf an der Feistritz is a municipality in the district of Weiz in the Austrian state of Styria.
