= Hofstätten an der Raab =

- Municipality
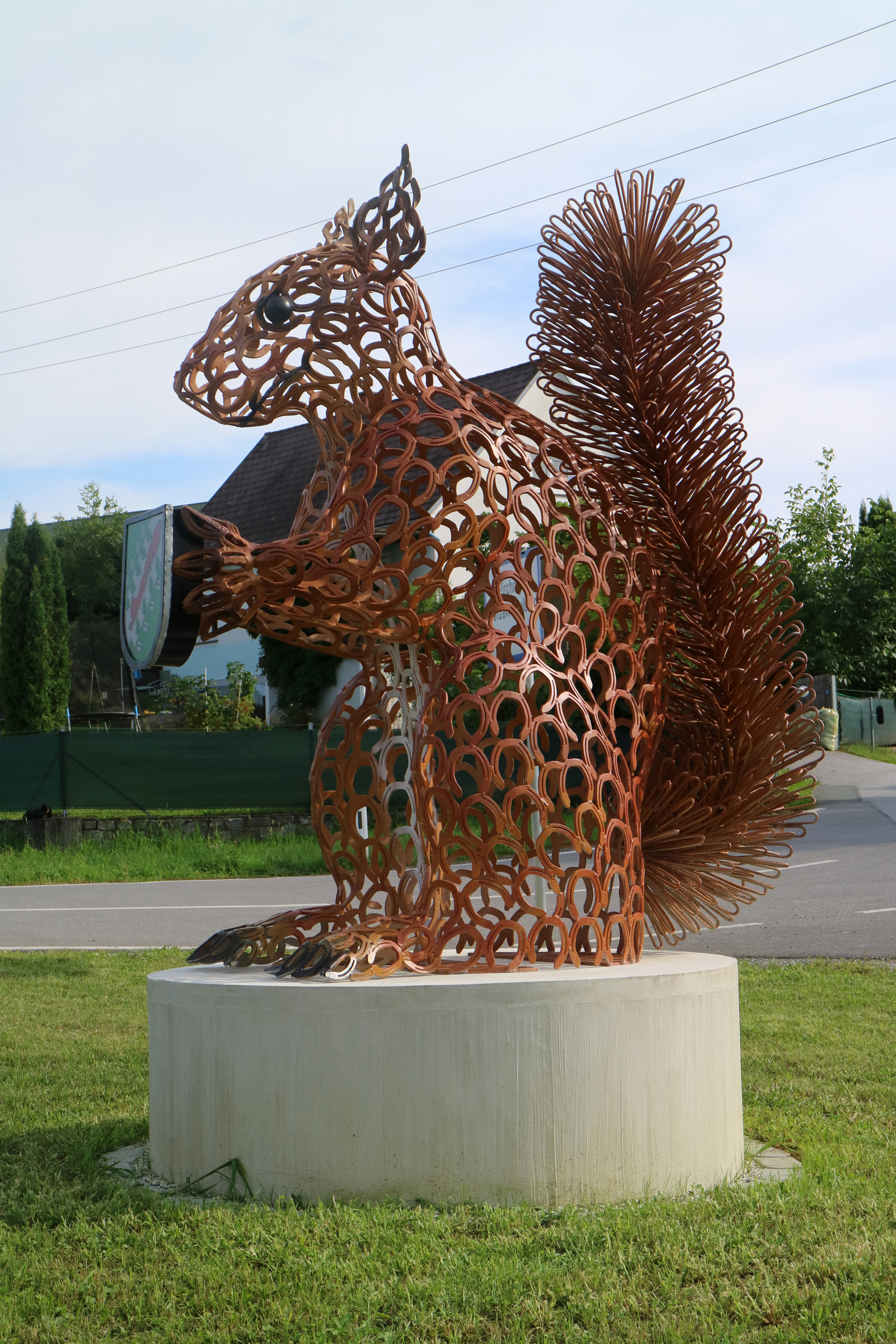
- Squirrel statue in Hofstätten

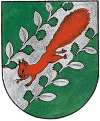
- Coat of arms

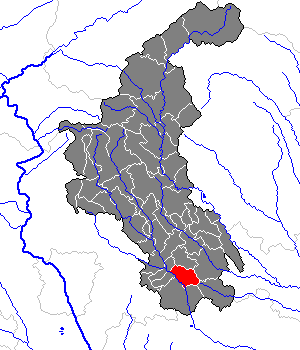
- Location within Weiz district

- Location within Austria
- Coordinates: 47°03′36″N 15°43′48″E
- Country: Austria
- State: Styria
- District: Weiz

Government
  - Mayor: Werner Höfler (ÖVP)

Area
  - Total: 15.23 km^{2} (5.88 sq mi)
- Elevation: 358 m (1,175 ft)

Population (2018-01-01)
  - Total: 2,253
  - Density: 147.9/km^{2} (383.1/sq mi)
- Time zone: UTC+1 (CET)
  - Summer (DST): UTC+2 (CEST)
- Postal code: 8200
- Area code: 03112
- Vehicle registration: WZ
- Website: www.hofstaetten.at

Hofstätten an der Raab is a municipality in the district of Weiz in the Austrian state of Styria.
