= List of cities and towns in Austria =

Main cities of Austria

This is a complete list of the cities and towns in Austria. There is no legal distinction between town and city in Austria; a Stadt (city) is an independent municipality that has been given the right to use that title.

Below is a list of some of the largest cities by population, as well as a full listing of all cities and municipalities of Austria.

== List of largest cities by population ==
The following is a list of the 20 largest cities and towns in Austria by population:

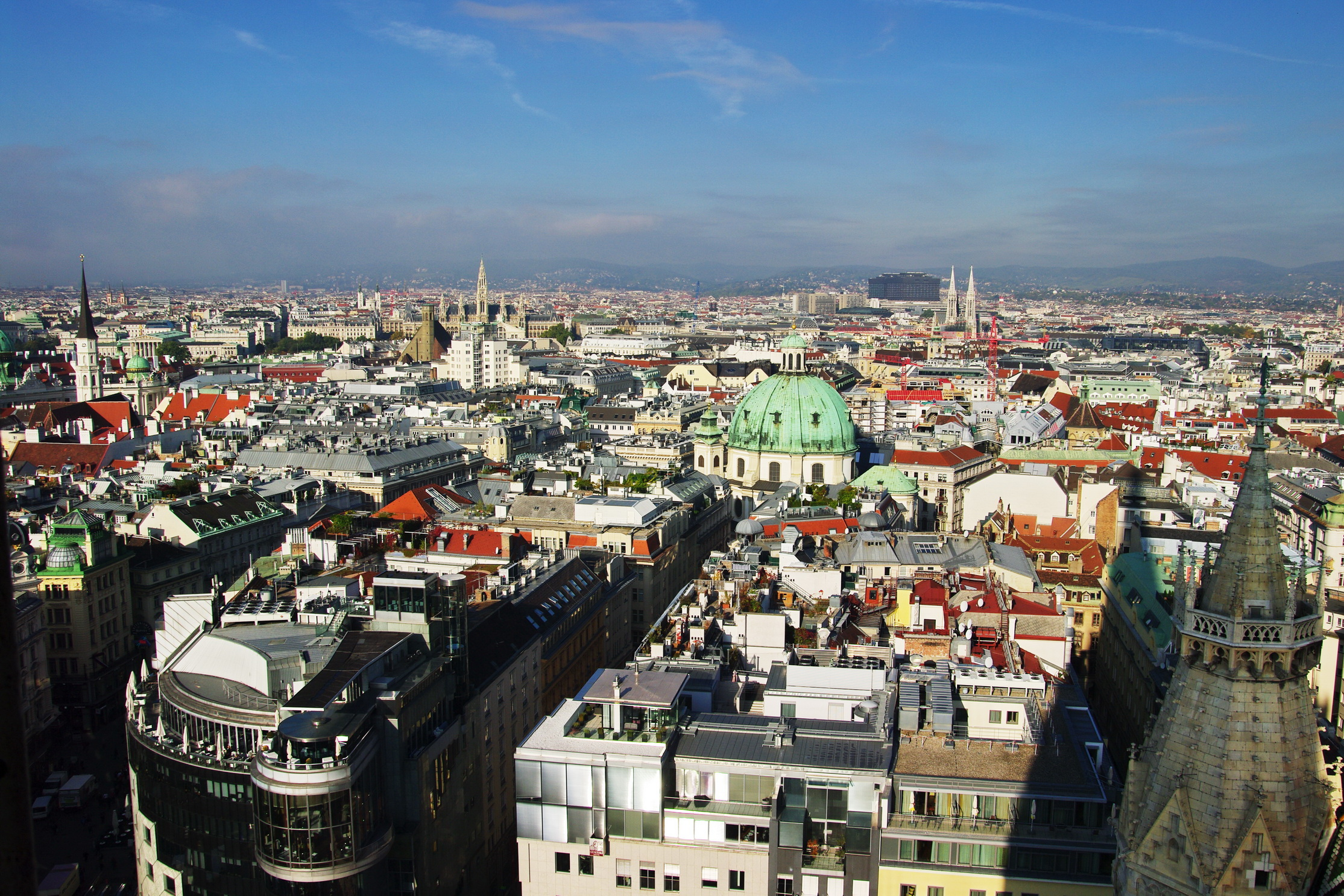
Vienna, capital of Austria

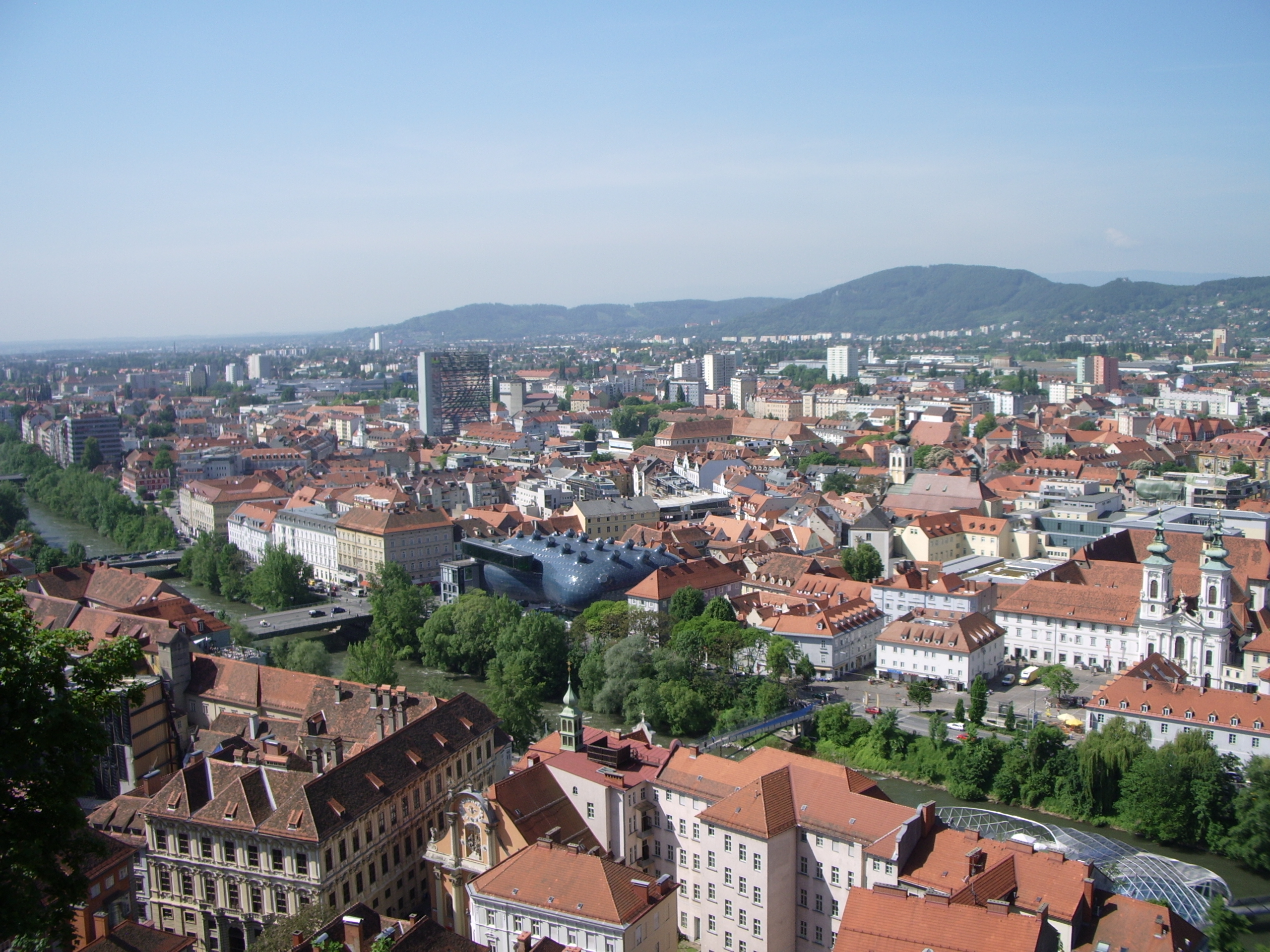
Graz

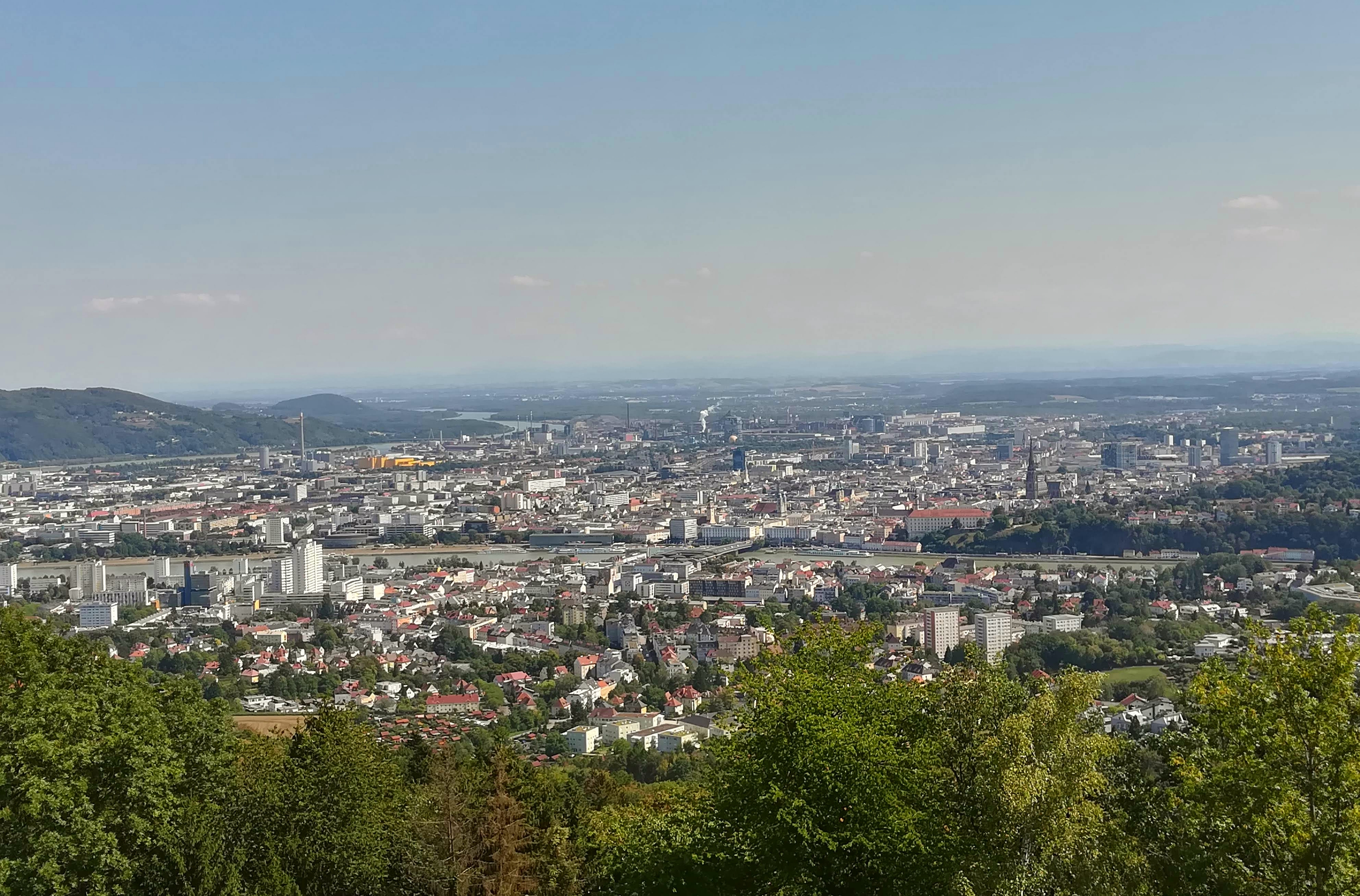
Linz

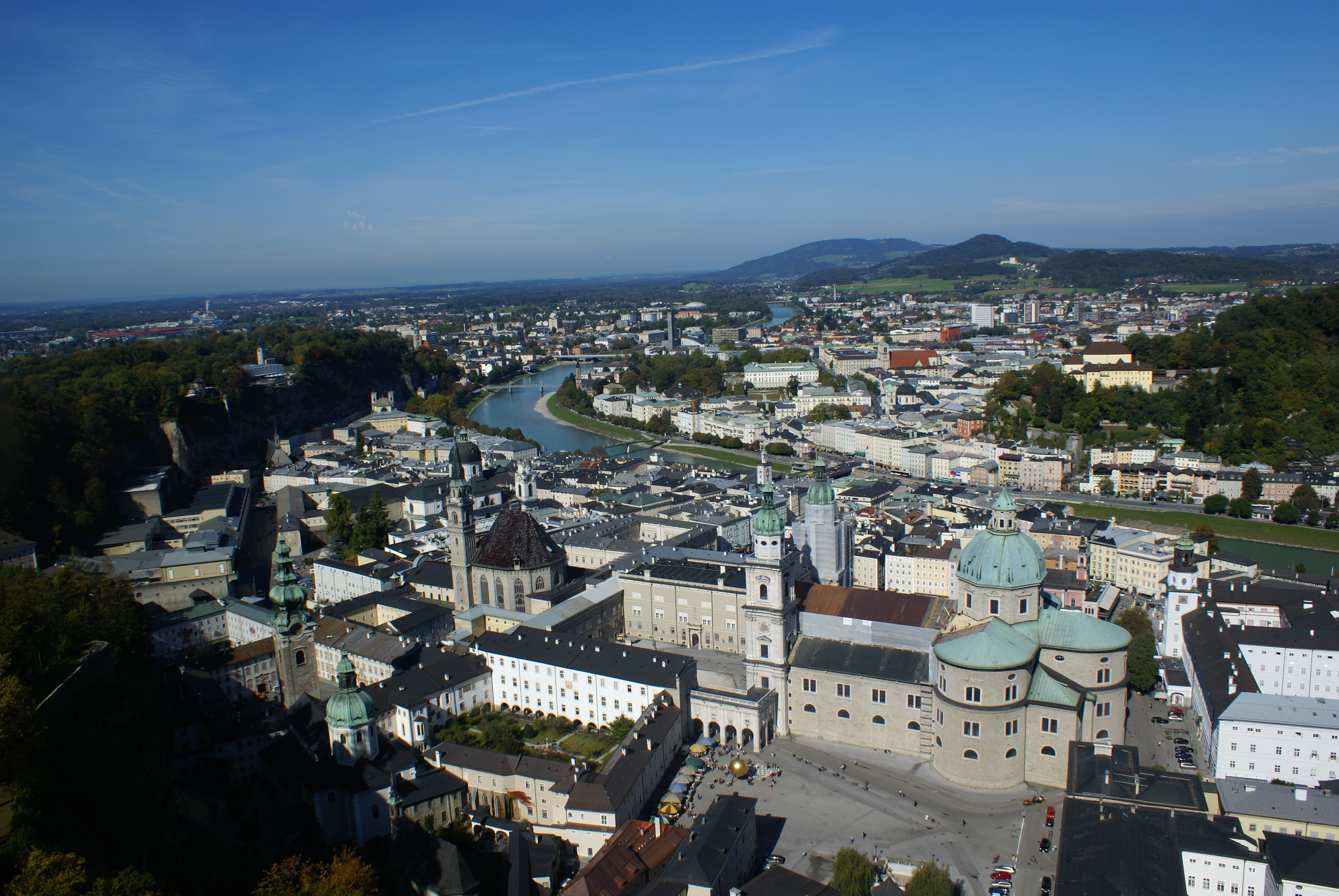
Salzburg

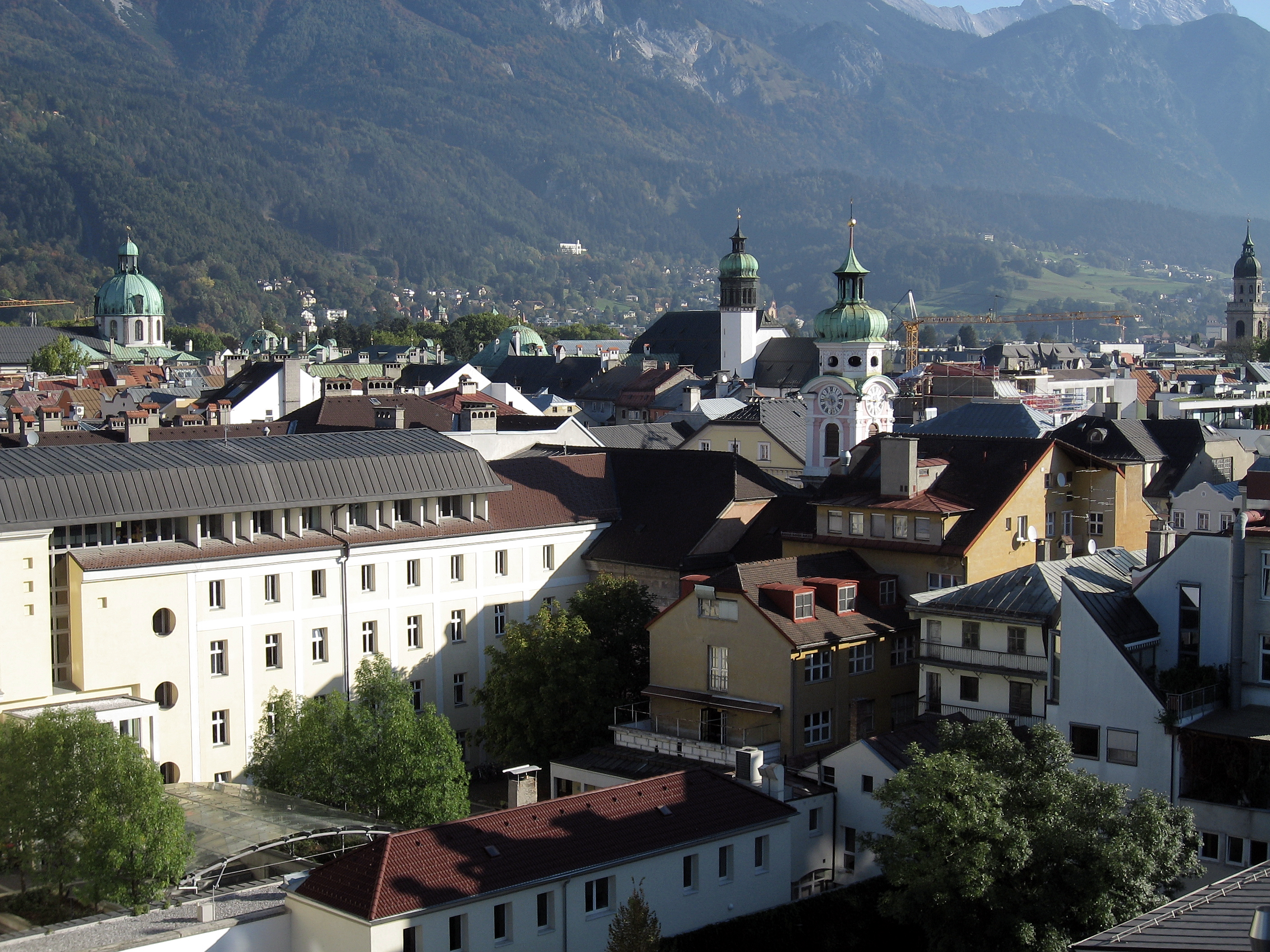
Innsbruck

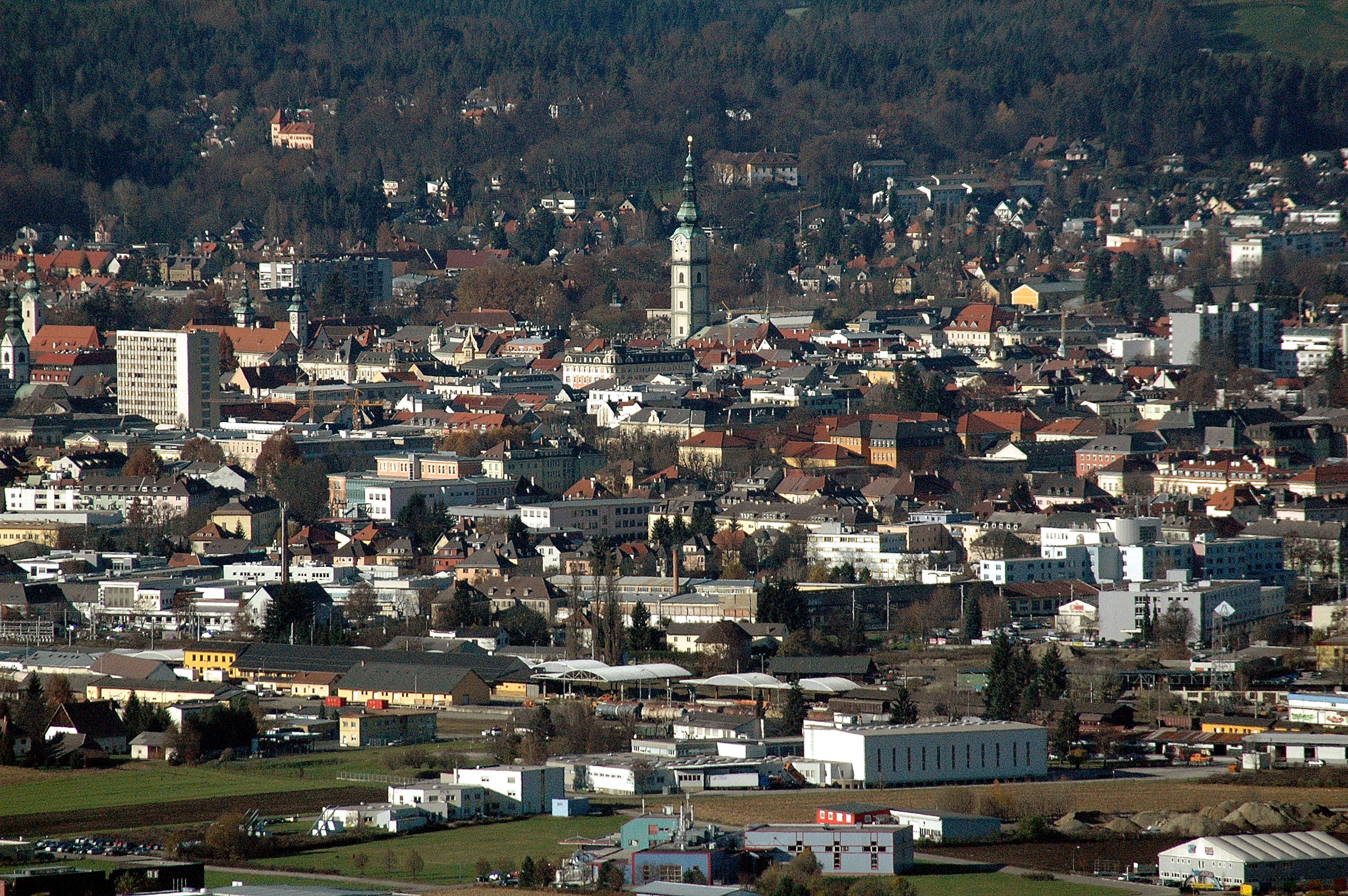
Klagenfurt am Wörthersee

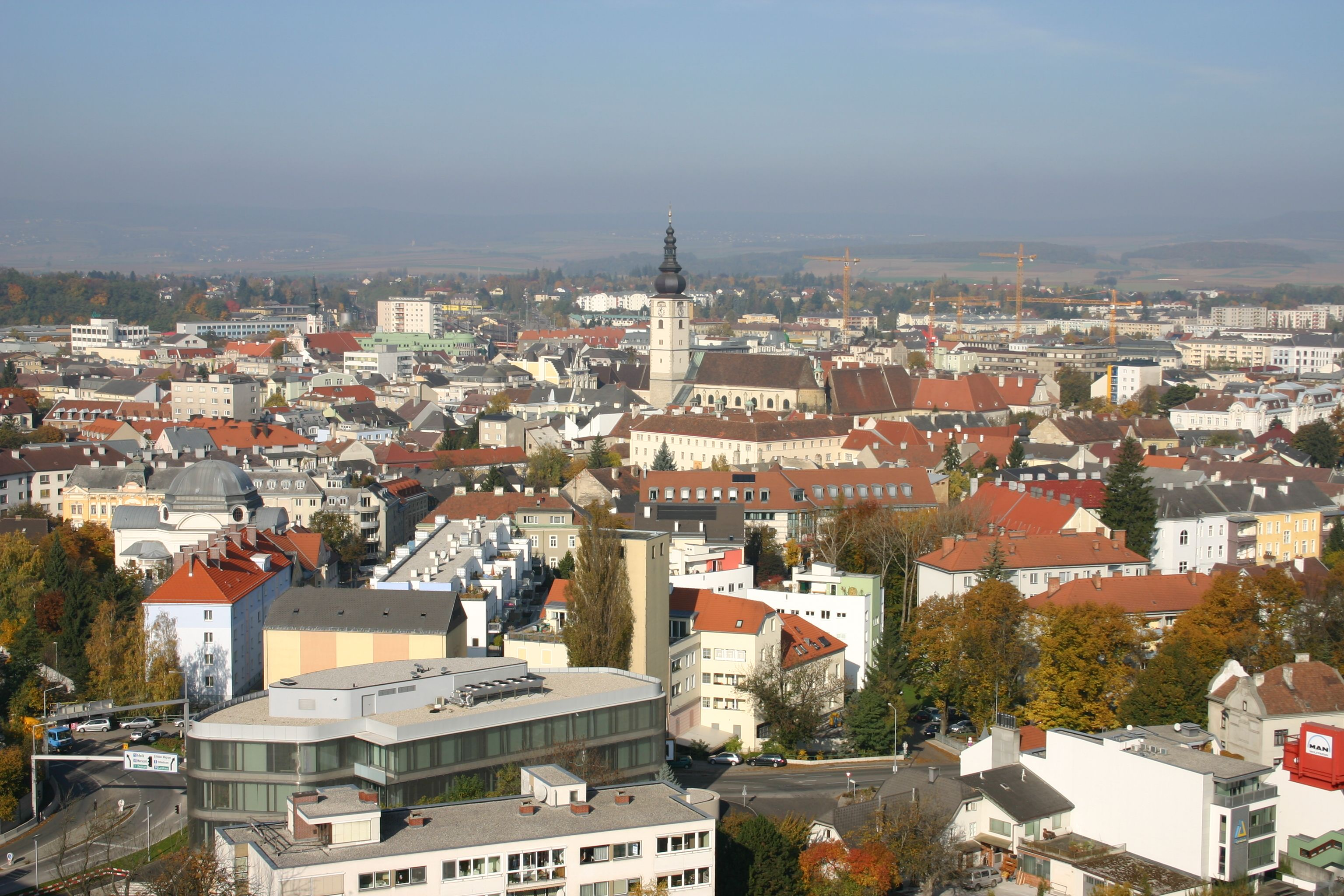
Sankt Pölten

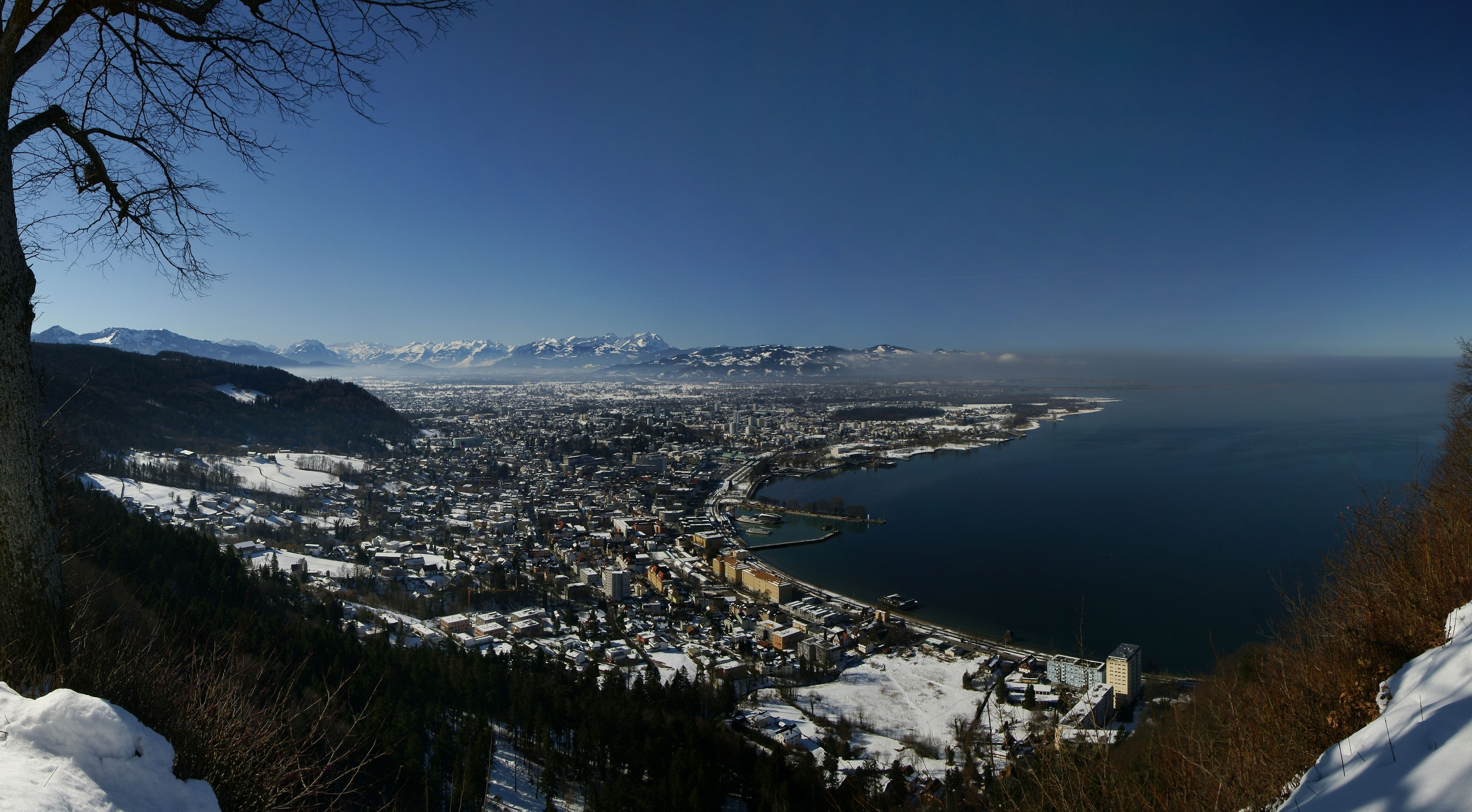
Bregenz

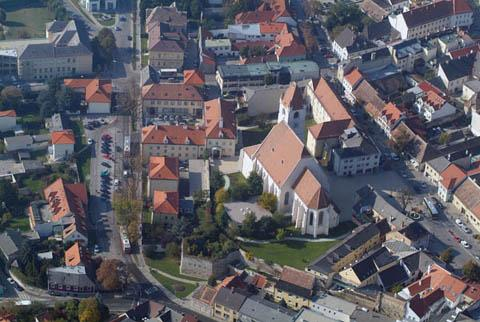
Eisenstadt

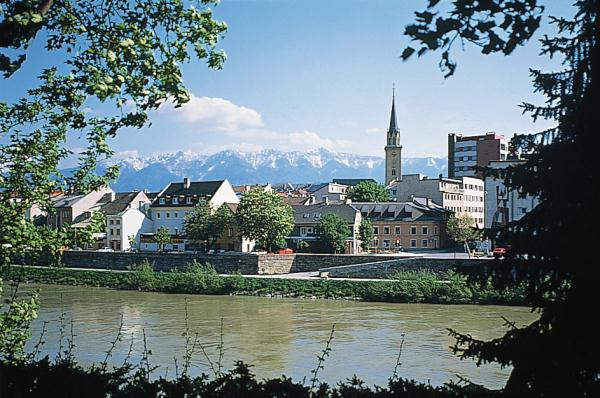
Villach

The capitals of the federal states are shown in bold face.

Name	Federal state	Population (2025)
**Vienna**	Vienna	2,028,289
**Graz**	Styria	305,314
**Linz**	Upper Austria	213,557
**Salzburg**	Salzburg	157,659
**Innsbruck**	Tyrol	132,499
**Klagenfurt am Wörthersee**	Carinthia	105,256
Villach	Carinthia	65,749
Wels	Upper Austria	65,482
**Sankt Pölten**	Lower Austria	59,767
Dornbirn	Vorarlberg	52,108
Wiener Neustadt	Lower Austria	49,156
Steyr	Upper Austria	38,036
Feldkirch	Vorarlberg	36,708
**Bregenz**	Vorarlberg	29,476
Leonding	Upper Austria	29,244
Klosterneuburg	Lower Austria	28,152
Baden bei Wien	Lower Austria	25,931
Traun	Upper Austria	25,345
Wolfsberg	Carinthia	24,961
Leoben	Styria	24,561

== Lists of cities, towns and municipalities divided by state ==
=== Burgenland ===
Name	Designation	Population (2015)
Andau	Market town	2,285
Antau	Other municipality	758
Apetlon	Market town	1,760
Bad Sauerbrunn	Other municipality	2,219
Bad Tatzmannsdorf	Other municipality	1,554
Badersdorf	Other municipality	287
Baumgarten	Other municipality	894
Bernstein	Market town	2,123
Bildein	Other municipality	343
Bocksdorf	Other municipality	813
Breitenbrunn am Neusiedler See	Market town	1,938
Bruckneudorf	Other municipality	3,026
Burgauberg-Neudauberg	Other municipality	1,360
Deutsch Jahrndorf	Other municipality	611
Deutsch Kaltenbrunn	Market town	1,721
Deutsch Schützen-Eisenberg	Other municipality	1,126
Deutschkreutz	Market town	3,088
Donnerskirchen	Market town	1,810
Draßburg	Other municipality	1,199
Draßmarkt	Market town	1,388
Eberau	Market town	911
Edelstal	Other municipality	747
Eisenstadt	Statutory city	14,476
Eltendorf	Other municipality	954
Forchtenstein	Other municipality	2,796
Frankenau-Unterpullendorf	Other municipality	1,109
Frauenkirchen	Other city	2,862
Gattendorf	Other municipality	1,332
Gerersdorf-Sulz	Other municipality	1,014
Gols	Market town	3,835
Grafenschachen	Other municipality	1,225
Großhöflein	Market town	2,048
Großmürbisch	Other municipality	242
Großpetersdorf	Market town	3,531
Großwarasdorf	Other municipality	1,381
Güssing	Other city	3,655
Güttenbach	Market town	898
Hackerberg	Other municipality	357
Halbturn	Other municipality	1,901
Hannersdorf	Other municipality	758
Heiligenbrunn	Other municipality	759
Heiligenkreuz im Lafnitztal	Market town	1,231
Heugraben	Other municipality	216
Hirm	Other municipality	1,009
Horitschon	Market town	1,861
Hornstein	Market town	3,012
Illmitz	Market town	2,385
Inzenhof	Other municipality	334
Jabing	Other municipality	734
Jennersdorf	Other city	4,096
Jois	Market town	1,612
Kaisersdorf	Other municipality	620
Kemeten	Other municipality	1,493
Kittsee	Market town	3,162
Kleinmürbisch	Other municipality	226
Klingenbach	Other municipality	1,172
Kobersdorf	Market town	1,883
Kohfidisch	Market town	1,462
Königsdorf	Other municipality	720
Krensdorf	Other municipality	642
Kukmirn	Market town	2,012
Lackenbach	Market town	1,167
Lackendorf	Other municipality	604
Leithaprodersdorf	Other municipality	1,193
Litzelsdorf	Market town	1,181
Lockenhaus	Market town	2,066
Loipersbach im Burgenland	Other municipality	1,229
Loipersdorf-Kitzladen	Other municipality	1,319
Loretto	Market town	475
Lutzmannsburg	Market town	861
Mannersdorf an der Rabnitz	Other municipality	1,795
Mariasdorf	Market town	1,145
Markt Allhau	Market town	1,845
Markt Neuhodis	Market town	658
Markt Sankt Martin	Market town	1,198
Marz	Other municipality	2,073
Mattersburg	Other city	7,349
Minihof-Liebau	Market town	1,054
Mischendorf	Other municipality	1,589
Mogersdorf	Market town	1,164
Mönchhof	Other municipality	2,236
Mörbisch am See	Other municipality	2,261
Moschendorf	Other municipality	400
Mühlgraben	Other municipality	396
Müllendorf	Other municipality	1,397
Neckenmarkt	Market town	1,680
Neuberg im Burgenland	Other municipality	978
Neudörf	Other municipality	720
Neudörfl	Market town	4,564
Neufeld an der Leitha	Other city	3,418
Neuhaus am Klausenbach	Market town	921
Neusiedl am See	Other city	8,235
Neustift an der Lafnitz	Market town	793
Neustift bei Güssing	Other municipality	474
Neutal	Other municipality	1,094
Nickelsdorf	Other municipality	1,772
Nikitsch	Other municipality	1,405
Oberdorf im Burgenland	Other municipality	996
Oberloisdorf	Other municipality	806
Oberpullendorf	Other city	3,188
Oberschützen	Other municipality	2,429
Oberwart	Other city	7,572
Oggau am Neusiedler See	Market town	1,739
Olbendorf	Other municipality	1,449
Ollersdorf im Burgenland	Market town	933
Oslip	Other municipality	1,243
Pama	Other municipality	1,204
Pamhagen	Other municipality	1,623
Parndorf	Other municipality	4,689
Pilgersdorf	Other municipality	1,656
Pinkafeld	Other city	5,779
Piringsdorf	Other municipality	847
Podersdorf am See	Market town	2,135
Pöttelsdorf	Other municipality	735
Pöttsching	Market town	2,950
Potzneusiedl	Other municipality	602
Purbach am Neusiedlersee	Other city	2,901
Raiding	Market town	865
Rauchwart	Other municipality	446
Rauhriegel	Other municipality	21
Rechnitz	Market town	3,054
Riedlingsdorf	Market town	1,619
Ritzing	Other municipality	902
Rohr im Burgenland	Other municipality	380
Rohrbach bei Mattersburg	Market town	2,707
Rotenturm an der Pinka	Market town	1,445
Rudersdorf	Market town	2,176
Rust	Statutory city	1,921
Sankt Andrä am Zicksee	Market town	1,371
Sankt Margarethen im Burgenland	Market town	2,636
Sankt Martin an der Raab	Market town	1,959
Sankt Michael im Burgenland	Market town	963
Schachendorf	Other municipality	765
Schandorf	Other municipality	276
Schattendorf	Market town	2,379
Schützen am Gebirge	Other municipality	1,392
Siegendorf	Market town	2,963
Sieggraben	Other municipality	1,248
Sigleß	Other municipality	1,183
Stadtschlaining	Other city	1,980
Stegersbach	Market town	2,658
Steinberg-Dörfl	Market town	1,291
Steinbrunn	Market town	2,614
Stinatz	Market town	1,263
Stoob	Market town	1,386
Stotzing	Other municipality	840
Strem	Market town	900
Tadten	Other municipality	1,186
Tobaj	Other municipality	1,372
Trausdorf an der Wulka	Other municipality	2,064
Tschanigraben	Other municipality	62
Unterfrauenhaid	Market town	681
Unterkohlstätten	Other municipality	1,029
Unterrabnitz-Schwendgraben	Other municipality	650
Unterwart	Other municipality	971
Wallern im Burgenland	Market town	1,702
Weichselbaum	Other municipality	720
Weiden am See	Market town	2,426
Weiden bei Rechnitz	Other municipality	824
Weingraben	Other municipality	363
Weppersdorf	Market town	1,826
Wiesen	Market town	2,691
Wiesfleck	Other municipality	1,158
Wimpassing an der Leitha	Other municipality	1,549
Winden am See	Other municipality	1,315
Wolfau	Market town	1,436
Wörterberg	Other municipality	488
Wulkaprodersdorf	Market town	1,944
Zagersdorf	Other municipality	1,027
Zemendorf-Stöttera	Other municipality	1,268
Zillingtal	Other municipality	933
Zurndorf	Market town	2,247

=== Carinthia ===
Name	Designation	Population (2025)
Afritz am See	Other municipality	1,480
Albeck	Other municipality	965
Althofen	Other city	4,950
Arnoldstein	Market town	7,157
Arriach	Other municipality	1,333
Bad Bleiberg	Market town	2,141
Bad Kleinkirchheim	Other municipality	1,657
Bad Sankt Leonhard im Lavanttal	Other city	4,244
Baldramsdorf	Other municipality	1,839
Berg im Drautal	Other municipality	1,224
Bleiburg	Other city	3,983
Brückl	Market town	2,734
Dellach	Other municipality	1,185
Dellach im Drautal	Other municipality	1,626
Deutsch-Griffen	Other municipality	822
Diex	Other municipality	788
Ebenthal in Kärnten	Market town	8,224
Eberndorf	Market town	5,989
Eberstein	Market town	1,227
Eisenkappel-Vellach	Market town	2,218
Feistritz an der Gail	Other municipality	643
Feistritz im Rosental	Market town	2,502
Feistritz ob Bleiburg	Market town	2,241
Feld am See	Other municipality	1,042
Feldkirchen in Kärnten	Other city	14,528
Ferlach	Other city	7,513
Ferndorf	Other municipality	2,013
Finkenstein am Faaker See	Market town	9,466
Flattach	Other municipality	1,121
Frantschach-Sankt Gertraud	Market town	2,394
Frauenstein	Other municipality	3,580
Fresach	Other municipality	1,239
Friesach	Other city	4,852
Gallizien	Other municipality	1,791
Gitschtal	Other municipality	1,288
Glanegg	Other municipality	1,780
Globasnitz	Other municipality	1,576
Glödnitz	Other municipality	835
Gmünd in Kärnten	Other city	2,554
Gnesau	Other municipality	1,034
Grafenstein	Market town	3,088
Greifenburg	Market town	1,702
Griffen	Market town	3,391
Großkirchheim	Other municipality	1,307
Gurk	Market town	1,178
Guttaring	Market town	1,498
Heiligenblut am Großglockner	Other municipality	959
Hermagor-Pressegger See	Other city	6,905
Himmelberg	Other municipality	2,329
Hohenthurn	Other municipality	872
Hüttenberg	Market town	1,274
Irschen	Other municipality	1,912
Kappel am Krappfeld	Other municipality	1,936
Keutschach am See	Other municipality	2,418
Kirchbach	Market town	2,478
Klagenfurt am Wörthersee	Statutory city	105,256
Kleblach-Lind	Other municipality	1,161
Klein Sankt Paul	Market town	1,785
Kötschach-Mauthen	Market town	3,320
Köttmannsdorf	Other municipality	3,186
Krems in Kärnten	Other municipality	1,603
Krumpendorf am Wörthersee	Other municipality	3,579
Lavamünd	Market town	2,757
Lendorf	Other municipality	1,779
Lesachtal	Other municipality	1,274
Liebenfels	Market town	3,416
Ludmannsdorf	Other municipality	1,812
Lurnfeld	Market town	2,676
Magdalensberg	Market town	3,730
Mallnitz	Other municipality	771
Malta	Other municipality	1,867
Maria Rain	Other municipality	2,732
Maria Saal	Market town	4,024
Maria Wörth	Other municipality	1,661
Metnitz	Market town	1,810
Micheldorf	Other municipality	959
Millstatt am See	Market town	3,464
Mölbling	Other municipality	1,314
Moosburg	Market town	4,667
Mörtschach	Other municipality	816
Mühldorf	Other municipality	1,022
Neuhaus	Other municipality	1,020
Nötsch im Gailtal	Market town	2,340
Oberdrauburg	Market town	1,198
Obervellach	Market town	2,154
Ossiach	Other municipality	724
Paternion	Market town	5,778
Poggersdorf	Other municipality	3,353
Pörtschach am Wörthersee	Other municipality	3,002
Preitenegg	Other municipality	891
Radenthein	Other city	5,742
Rangersdorf	Other municipality	1,700
Reichenau	Other municipality	1,695
Reichenfels	Market town	1,700
Reißeck	Other municipality	2,085
Rennweg am Katschberg	Market town	1,650
Rosegg	Market town	1,910
Ruden	Other municipality	1,499
Sachsenburg	Market town	1,333
Schiefling am Wörthersee	Other municipality	2,683
Seeboden am Millstätter See	Market town	6,706
Sittersdorf	Other municipality	1,947
Spittal an der Drau	Other city	15,341
Sankt Andrä	Other city	9,840
Sankt Georgen am Längsee	Other municipality	3,600
Sankt Georgen im Lavanttal	Other municipality	1,915
Sankt Jakob im Rosental	Market town	4,357
Sankt Kanzian am Klopeiner See	Other municipality	4,636
Sankt Margareten im Rosental	Other municipality	1,087
Sankt Paul im Lavanttal	Market town	3,144
Sankt Stefan im Gailtal	Other municipality	1,551
Sankt Urban	Other municipality	1,639
Sankt Veit an der Glan	Other city	12,234
Stall	Other municipality	1,493
Steindorf am Ossiacher See	Other municipality	3,844
Steinfeld	Market town	1,996
Steuerberg	Other municipality	1,573
Stockenboi	Other municipality	1,556
Straßburg	Other city	1,964
Techelsberg am Wörther See	Other municipality	2,212
Trebesing	Other municipality	1,143
Treffen am Ossiacher See	Market town	4,563
Velden am Wörther See	Market town	9,183
Villach	Statutory city	65,749
Völkermarkt	Other city	10,902
Weißensee	Other municipality	759
Weißenstein	Market town	2,921
Weitensfeld im Gurktal	Market town	1,982
Wernberg	Other municipality	5,662
Winklern	Market town	1,185
Wolfsberg	Other city	24,961
Zell	Other municipality	587

=== Lower Austria ===
Name	Designation	Population (2015)
Absdorf	Market town	2,087
Achau	Other municipality	1,415
Aderklaa	Other municipality	207
Aggsbach	Market town	643
Alberndorf im Pulkautal	Other municipality	744
Albrechtsberg an der Großen Krems	Market town	1,036
Alland	Market town	2,622
Allentsteig	Other city	1,835
Allhartsberg	Market town	2,108
Altenburg	Other municipality	828
Altendorf	Other municipality	348
Altenmarkt an der Triesting	Market town	2,113
Altlengbach	Market town	2,927
Altlichtenwarth	Other municipality	769
Altmelon	Market town	862
Amaliendorf-Aalfang	Other municipality	1,102
Amstetten	Other city	23,656
Andlersdorf	Other municipality	137
Angern an der March	Market town	3,384
Annaberg	Other municipality	533
Arbesbach	Market town	1,638
Ardagger	Market town	3,511
Artstetten-Pöbring	Other municipality	1,184
Aschbach-Markt	Market town	3,811
Aspangberg-Sankt Peter	Other municipality	1,888
Aspang-Markt	Market town	1,816
Asparn an der Zaya	Market town	1,865
Asperhofen	Market town	2,206
Atzenbrugg	Market town	2,948
Au am Leithaberge	Market town	934
Auersthal	Market town	1,932
Bad Deutsch-Altenburg	Market town	1,765
Bad Erlach	Market town	3,084
Bad Fischau-Brunn	Market town	3,440
Bad Großpertholz	Market town	1,359
Bad Pirawarth	Market town	1,671
Bad Schönau	Other municipality	721
Bad Traunstein	Market town	1,036
Bad Vöslau	Other city	11,961
Baden bei Wien	Other city	26,286
Bärnkopf	Other municipality	355
Behamberg	Other municipality	3,387
Berg	Other municipality	861
Bergern im Dunkelsteinerwald	Other municipality	1,253
Bergland	Other municipality	1,909
Berndorf	Other city	9,064
Bernhardsthal	Market town	1,604
Biberbach	Other municipality	2,270
Biedermannsdorf	Market town	2,988
Bisamberg	Other municipality	4,729
Bischofstetten	Other municipality	1,176
Blindenmarkt	Market town	2,712
Blumau-Neurißhof	Other municipality	1,840
Bockfließ	Market town	1,348
Böheimkirchen	Market town	5,087
Brand-Laaben	Other municipality	1,232
Brand-Nagelberg	Other municipality	1,546
Breitenau	Other municipality	1,576
Breitenfurt bei Wien	Market town	5,853
Breitenstein	Other municipality	318
Bromberg	Market town	1,232
Bruck an der Leitha	Other city	7,988
Brunn am Gebirge	Market town	11,864
Brunn an der Wild	Other municipality	826
Buchbach	Other municipality	330
Burgschleinitz-Kühnring	Market town	1,360
Bürg-Vöstenhof	Other municipality	179
Deutsch-Wagram	Other city	8,651
Dietmanns	Market town	1,063
Dobersberg	Market town	1,618
Dorfstetten	Other municipality	584
Drasenhofen	Other municipality	1,109
Drosendorf-Zissersdorf	Other city	1,213
Drösing	Market town	1,132
Droß	Other municipality	983
Dunkelsteinerwald	Market town	2,390
Dürnkrut	Market town	2,267
Dürnstein	Other city	864
Ebenfurth	Other city	3,170
Ebenthal	Market town	923
Ebergassing	Other municipality	3,904
Ebreichsdorf	Other city	10,942
Echsenbach	Market town	1,256
Eckartsau	Market town	1,283
Edlitz	Market town	934
Eggenburg	Other city	3,540
Eggendorf	Other municipality	4,794
Eggern	Other municipality	688
Eichgraben	Market town	4,614
Eisgarn	Other municipality	684
Emmersdorf an der Donau	Market town	1,778
Engelhartstetten	Market town	2,055
Ennsdorf	Other municipality	3,031
Enzenreith	Other municipality	1,946
Enzersdorf an der Fischa	Market town	3,163
Enzersfeld im Weinviertel	Other municipality	1,713
Enzesfeld-Lindabrunn	Market town	4,174
Erlauf	Market town	1,069
Ernstbrunn	Other municipality	3,213
Ernsthofen	Other municipality	2,230
Ertl	Other municipality	1,252
Eschenau	Other municipality	1,306
Euratsfeld	Market town	2,639
Falkenstein	Market town	457
Fallbach	Other municipality	819
Feistritz am Wechsel	Other municipality	1,038
Felixdorf	Market town	4,292
Fels am Wagram	Market town	2,318
Ferschnitz	Market town	1,770
Fischamend	Other city	5,583
Frankenfels	Market town	1,975
Furth an der Triesting	Other municipality	862
Furth bei Göttweig	Market town	2,956
Gaaden	Other municipality	1,624
Gablitz	Market town	4,968
Gaming	Market town	3,121
Gänserndorf	Other city	11,404
Gars am Kamp	Market town	3,534
Gastern	Market town	1,218
Gaubitsch	Other municipality	894
Gaweinstal	Market town	3,947
Gedersdorf	Other municipality	2,184
Geras	Other city	1,325
Gerasdorf bei Wien	Other city	11,155
Gerersdorf	Other municipality	974
Gföhl	Other city	3,783
Gießhübl	Other municipality	2,335
Glinzendorf	Other municipality	295
Gloggnitz	Other city	5,916
Gmünd	Other city	5,375
Gnadendorf	Other municipality	1,127
Göllersdorf	Market town	2,999
Golling an der Erlauf	Market town	1,514
Göpfritz an der Wild	Market town	1,826
Göstling an der Ybbs	Market town	2,058
Göttlesbrunn-Arbesthal	Other municipality	1,411
Götzendorf an der Leitha	Market town	2,062
Grabern	Market town	1,642
Grafenbach-Sankt Valentin	Market town	2,264
Grafenegg	Market town	3,061
Grafenschlag	Market town	853
Grafenwörth	Market town	3,132
Gramatneusiedl	Market town	3,461
Gresten	Market town	1,987
Gresten-Land	Other municipality	1,521
Grimmenstein	Market town	1,348
Groß Gerungs	Other city	4,506
Großdietmanns	Market town	2,215
Großebersdorf	Market town	2,236
Großengersdorf	Market town	1,478
Groß-Enzersdorf	Other city	11,206
Großgöttfritz	Market town	1,371
Großharras	Market town	1,116
Großhofen	Other municipality	98
Großkrut	Market town	1,572
Großmugl	Market town	1,595
Großriedenthal	Other municipality	899
Großrußbach	Market town	2,194
Großschönau	Market town	1,211
Groß-Schweinbarth	Market town	1,245
Groß-Siegharts	Other city	2,775
Großweikersdorf	Market town	3,180
Grünbach am Schneeberg	Market town	1,647
Gumpoldskirchen	Market town	3,899
Günselsdorf	Market town	1,707
Guntersdorf	Market town	1,145
Guntramsdorf	Market town	9,179
Gutenbrunn	Market town	536
Gutenstein	Market town	1,268
Haag	Other city	5,548
Hadersdorf-Kammern	Market town	2,009
Hadres	Market town	1,685
Hafnerbach	Market town	1,672
Hagenbrunn	Market town	2,227
Haidershofen	Other municipality	3,670
Hainburg an der Donau	Other city	6,570
Hainfeld	Other city	3,726
Hardegg	Other city	1,309
Haringsee	Other municipality	1,179
Harmannsdorf	Market town	3,951
Haslau-Maria Ellend	Other municipality	2,004
Haugschlag	Other municipality	485
Haugsdorf	Market town	1,548
Haunoldstein	Other municipality	1,160
Hausbrunn	Market town	857
Hauskirchen	Other municipality	1,248
Hausleiten	Market town	3,784
Heidenreichstein	Other city	4,010
Heiligenkreuz	Other municipality	1,525
Heldenberg	Other municipality	1,270
Hennersdorf bei Wien	Other municipality	1,541
Hernstein	Market town	1,542
Herrnbaumgarten	Market town	943
Herzogenburg	Other city	7,771
Himberg	Market town	7,375
Hinterbrühl	Market town	4,029
Hirschbach	Market town	581
Hirtenberg	Market town	2,586
Hochleithen	Other municipality	1,166
Hochneukirchen-Gschaidt	Market town	1,633
Hochwolkersdorf	Other municipality	1,004
Hof am Leithaberge	Market town	1,549
Hofamt Priel	Other municipality	1,675
Höflein	Other municipality	1,234
Höflein an der Hohen Wand	Other municipality	895
Hofstetten-Grünau	Market town	2,693
Hohe Wand	Other municipality	1,428
Hohenau an der March	Market town	2,738
Hohenberg	Market town	1,515
Hoheneich	Market town	1,424
Hohenruppersdorf	Market town	910
Hohenwarth-Mühlbach am Manhartsberg	Market town	1,304
Hollabrunn	Other city	11,681
Hollenstein an der Ybbs	Other municipality	1,706
Hollenthon	Other municipality	1,018
Horn	Other city	6,520
Hundsheim	Other municipality	590
Hürm	Market town	1,828
Inzersdorf-Getzersdorf	Other municipality	1,581
Irnfritz-Messern	Market town	1,409
Jaidhof	Other municipality	1,225
Japons	Market town	733
Jedenspeigen	Market town	1,064
Judenau-Baumgarten	Market town	2,262
Kaltenleutgeben	Market town	3,276
Kapelln	Market town	1,381
Karlstein an der Thaya	Market town	1,468
Karlstetten	Market town	2,159
Kasten bei Böheimkirchen	Other municipality	1,409
Katzelsdorf	Other municipality	3,257
Kaumberg	Market town	1,016
Kautzen	Market town	1,119
Kematen an der Ybbs	Other municipality	2,625
Kilb	Market town	2,543
Kirchberg am Wagram	Market town	3,670
Kirchberg am Walde	Market town	1,313
Kirchberg am Wechsel	Market town	2,505
Kirchberg an der Pielach	Market town	3,225
Kirchschlag	Market town	621
Kirchschlag in der Buckligen Welt	Other city	2,889
Kirchstetten	Market town	2,189
Kirnberg an der Mank	Other municipality	1,070
Klausen-Leopoldsdorf	Other municipality	1,681
Klein-Neusiedl	Other municipality	907
Klein-Pöchlarn	Market town	991
Kleinzell	Other municipality	831
Klosterneuburg	Other city	27,058
Königsbrunn am Wagram	Market town	1,319
Königstetten	Market town	2,406
Korneuburg	Other city	12,986
Kottes-Purk	Market town	1,485
Kottingbrunn	Market town	7,417
Krems an der Donau	Statutory city	24,610
Kreuttal	Other municipality	1,429
Kreuzstetten	Market town	1,541
Krumau am Kamp	Market town	759
Krumbach	Market town	2,316
Krummnußbaum	Market town	1,500
Laa an der Thaya	Other city	6,280
Laab im Walde	Other municipality	1,137
Ladendorf	Market town	2,298
Langau	Market town	673
Langenlois	Other city	7,609
Langenrohr	Market town	2,369
Langenzersdorf	Market town	8,137
Langschlag	Market town	1,782
Lanzendorf	Other municipality	1,886
Lanzenkirchen	Other municipality	3,983
Lassee	Market town	2,765
Laxenburg	Market town	2,828
Leiben	Market town	1,362
Leitzersdorf	Other municipality	1,204
Lengenfeld	Market town	1,412
Leobendorf	Market town	4,847
Leobersdorf	Market town	4,915
Leopoldsdorf	Market town	5,078
Leopoldsdorf im Marchfelde	Market town	2,848
Lichtenau im Waldviertel	Market town	2,049
Lichtenegg	Other municipality	1,034
Lichtenwörth	Market town	2,727
Lilienfeld	Other city	2,833
Litschau	Other city	2,259
Loich	Other municipality	603
Loosdorf	Market town	3,794
Ludweis-Aigen	Market town	914
Lunz am See	Market town	1,806
Mailberg	Market town	558
Maissau	Other city	1,946
Mank	Other city	3,219
Mannersdorf am Leithagebirge	Other city	4,069
Mannsdorf an der Donau	Other municipality	342
Marbach an der Donau	Market town	1,677
Marchegg	Other city	2,960
Maria Enzersdorf	Market town	8,829
Maria Laach am Jauerling	Market town	916
Maria Taferl	Market town	887
Maria Anzbach	Market town	3,055
Maria Lanzendorf	Other municipality	2,129
Markersdorf-Haindorf	Market town	2,083
Markgrafneusiedl	Other municipality	832
Markt Piesting	Market town	3,007
Martinsberg	Market town	1,096
Matzendorf-Hölles	Other municipality	2,040
Matzen-Raggendorf	Market town	2,794
Mauerbach	Market town	3,661
Mautern an der Donau	Other city	3,567
Meiseldorf	Other municipality	876
Melk	Other city	5,529
Michelbach	Market town	915
Michelhausen	Market town	3,113
Miesenbach	Other municipality	703
Mistelbach	Other city	11,559
Mitterbach am Erlaufsee	Other municipality	499
Mitterndorf an der Fischa	Other municipality	2,685
Mödling	Other city	20,555
Mönichkirchen	Market town	606
Moorbad Harbach	Other municipality	717
Moosbrunn	Other municipality	1,777
Muckendorf-Wipfing	Other municipality	1,573
Muggendorf	Other municipality	528
Mühldorf	Market town	1,331
Münchendorf	Other municipality	2,992
Münichreith-Laimbach	Other municipality	1,662
Nappersdorf-Kammersdorf	Market town	1,233
Natschbach-Loipersbach	Other municipality	1,702
Neidling	Market town	1,461
Neudorf bei Staatz	Other municipality	1,430
Neuhofen an der Ybbs	Other municipality	2,930
Neulengbach	Other city	8,281
Neumarkt an der Ybbs	Market town	1,919
Neunkirchen	Other city	12,879
Neusiedl an der Zaya	Market town	1,252
Neustadtl an der Donau	Other municipality	2,143
Neustift-Innermanzing	Other municipality	1,543
Niederhollabrunn	Market town	1,534
Niederleis	Other municipality	861
Nöchling	Market town	1,077
Nußdorf ob der Traisen	Market town	1,758
Ober-Grafendorf	Market town	4,544
Oberndorf an der Melk	Other municipality	2,957
Obersiebenbrunn	Market town	1,708
Oberwaltersdorf	Market town	4,618
Obritzberg-Rust	Market town	2,342
Oed-Öhling	Market town	1,884
Opponitz	Other municipality	947
Orth an der Donau	Market town	2,086
Ottenschlag	Market town	1,002
Ottenthal	Other municipality	544
Otterthal	Other municipality	592
Palterndorf-Dobermannsdorf	Market town	1,333
Parbasdorf	Other municipality	169
Paudorf	Market town	2,598
Payerbach	Market town	2,076
Perchtoldsdorf	Market town	15,047
Pernegg	Market town	701
Pernersdorf	Market town	1,022
Pernitz	Market town	2,473
Persenbeug-Gottsdorf	Market town	2,201
Petronell-Carnuntum	Other municipality	1,245
Petzenkirchen	Market town	1,311
Pfaffenschlag bei Waidhofen	Other municipality	913
Pfaffstätten	Market town	3,551
Pillichsdorf	Other municipality	1,157
Pitten	Market town	2,697
Pöchlarn	Other city	3,912
Pöggstall	Market town	2,435
Pölla	Market town	939
Pottendorf	Market town	7,049
Pottenstein	Market town	2,909
Poysdorf	Other city	5,527
Prellenkirchen	Other municipality	1,577
Pressbaum	Other city	7,559
Prigglitz	Other municipality	434
Prinzersdorf	Market town	1,617
Prottes	Market town	1,436
Pürschling	Other municipality	1,395
Puchberg am Schneeberg	Market town	2,683
Puchenstuben	Other municipality	311
Pulkau	Other city	1,560
Purgstall an der Erlauf	Market town	5,348
Purkersdorf	Other city	9,701
Pyhra	Market town	3,553
Raabs an der Thaya	Other city	2,651
Raach am Hochgebirge	Other municipality	281
Raasdorf	Other municipality	645
Rabensburg	Market town	1,100
Rabenstein an der Pielach	Market town	2,560
Ramsau	Other municipality	850
Randegg	Market town	1,880
Rappottenstein	Market town	1,724
Rastenfeld	Market town	1,551
Rauchenwarth	Other municipality	742
Ravelsbach	Market town	1,580
Raxendorf	Market town	1,050
Reichenau an der Rax	Market town	2,571
Reingers	Other municipality	635
Reinsberg	Other municipality	1,027
Reisenberg	Market town	1,689
Retz	Other city	4,249
Retzbach	Other municipality	1,002
Ringelsdorf-Niederabsdorf	Market town	1,260
Rohr im Gebirge	Other municipality	476
Rohrau	Other municipality	1,609
Rohrbach an der Gölsen	Other municipality	1,556
Röhrenbach	Other municipality	522
Rohrendorf bei Krems	Other municipality	2,091
Röschitz	Market town	1,052
Rosenburg-Mold	Other municipality	856
Rossatz-Arnsdorf	Market town	1,065
Ruprechtshofen	Market town	2,315
Rußbach	Other municipality	1,424
Sallingberg	Market town	1,291
Scharndorf	Other municipality	1,159
Scheibbs	Other city	4,196
Scheiblingkirchen-Thernberg	Market town	1,864
Schollach	Other municipality	976
Schönau an der Triesting	Other municipality	2,123
Schönbach	Market town	798
Schönberg am Kamp	Market town	1,903
Schönbühel-Aggsbach	Market town	981
Schönkirchen-Reyersdorf	Market town	1,963
Schottwien	Market town	660
Schrattenbach	Other municipality	363
Schrattenberg	Other municipality	810
Schrattenthal	Other city	868
Schrems	Other city	5,404
Schwadorf	Market town	2,180
Schwarzau am Steinfeld	Other municipality	1,924
Schwarzau im Gebirge	Other municipality	644
Schwarzenau	Market town	1,532
Schwarzenbach	Market town	941
Schwarzenbach an der Pielach	Other municipality	369
Schwechat	Other city	18,026
Schweiggers	Market town	2,004
Seebenstein	Other municipality	1,401
Seefeld-Kadolz	Market town	935
Seibersdorf	Market town	1,466
Seitenstetten	Market town	3,394
Semmering	Other municipality	544
Senftenberg	Market town	1,977
Sieghartskirchen	Market town	7,528
Sierndorf	Market town	3,933
Sigmundsherberg	Market town	1,651
Sitzenberg-Reidling	Other municipality	2,102
Sitzendorf an der Schmida	Market town	2,162
Sollenau	Market town	5,038
Sommerein	Market town	1,947
Sonntagberg	Market town	3,829
Sooß	Market town	1,050
Spannberg	Market town	1,010
Spillern	Market town	2,222
Spitz	Market town	1,620
Sankt Aegyd am Neuwalde	Market town	1,901
Sankt Andrä-Wördern	Market town	7,870
Sankt Anton an der Jeßnitz	Other municipality	1,211
Sankt Bernhard-Frauenhofen	Other municipality	1,299
Sankt Corona am Wechsel	Other municipality	390
Sankt Egyden am Steinfeld	Other municipality	1,924
Sankt Georgen am Reith	Other municipality	578
Sankt Georgen am Ybbsfelde	Market town	2,886
Sankt Georgen an der Leys	Other municipality	1,334
Sankt Leonhard am Forst	Market town	2,989
Sankt Leonhard am Hornerwald	Market town	1,119
Sankt Margarethen an der Sierning	Other municipality	1,013
Sankt Martin	Market town	1,124
Sankt Martin-Karlsbach	Market town	1,659
Sankt Oswald	Other municipality	1,124
Sankt Pantaleon-Erla	Other municipality	2,587
Sankt Peter in der Au	Market town	5,119
Sankt Pölten	Statutory city	54,649
Sankt Valentin	Other city	9,340
Sankt Veit an der Gölsen	Market town	3,915
Staatz	Market town	1,933
Statzendorf	Other municipality	1,362
Steinakirchen am Forst	Market town	2,274
Stetteldorf am Wagram	Market town	1,041
Stetten	Other municipality	1,357
Stockerau	Other city	16,916
Stössing	Other municipality	838
Straning-Grafenberg	Other municipality	781
Straß im Straßertale	Market town	1,678
Strasshof an der Nordbahn	Market town	10,009
Stratzing	Market town	827
Strengberg	Market town	2,055
Stronsdorf	Market town	1,584
Sulz im Weinviertel	Market town	1,189
Tattendorf	Other municipality	1,439
Teesdorf	Market town	1,822
Ternitz	Other city	14,632
Texingtal	Other municipality	1,615
Thaya	Market town	1,380
Theresienfeld	Market town	3,485
Thomasberg	Other municipality	1,284
Traisen	Other municipality	3,453
Traiskirchen	Other city	18,858
Traismauer	Other city	6,224
Trattenbach	Other municipality	545
Trautmannsdorf an der Leitha	Market town	2,886
Trumau	Market town	3,640
Tulbing	Market town	2,971
Tulln an der Donau	Other city	16,197
Tullnerbach	Market town	2,782
Türnitz	Other municipality	1,912
Ulrichskirchen-Schleinbach	Market town	2,630
Unserfrau-Altweitra	Other municipality	1,004
Untersiebenbrunn	Other municipality	1,736
Unterstinkenbrunn	Other municipality	560
Velm-Götzendorf	Other municipality	735
Viehdorf	Other municipality	1,372
Vitis	Market town	2,678
Vösendorf	Market town	6,990
Waidhofen an der Thaya	Other city	5,501
Waidhofen an der Thaya-Land	Other municipality	1,266
Waidhofen an der Ybbs	Statutory city	11,333
Waidmannsfeld	Other municipality	1,515
Waldegg	Market town	2,048
Waldenstein	Other municipality	1,195
Waldhausen	Market town	1,215
Waldkirchen an der Thaya	Market town	534
Wallsee-Sindelburg	Market town	2,178
Walpersbach	Other municipality	1,125
Wang	Market town	1,355
Warth	Market town	1,512
Wartmannstetten	Market town	1,605
Weiden an der March	Other municipality	991
Weikendorf	Market town	2,029
Weikersdorf am Steinfelde	Other municipality	1,066
Weinburg	Other municipality	1,337
Weinzierl am Walde	Other municipality	1,240
Weissenbach an der Triesting	Market town	1,727
Weißenkirchen in der Wachau	Market town	1,429
Weistrach	Other municipality	2,216
Weiten	Market town	1,094
Weitersfeld	Other municipality	1,576
Weitra	Other city	2,693
Wiener Neudorf	Market town	9,405
Wiener Neustadt	Statutory city	44,820
Wienerwald	Other municipality	2,858
Wieselburg	Other city	4,143
Wieselburg-Land	Other municipality	3,311
Wiesmath	Market town	1,509
Wildendürnbach	Other municipality	1,574
Wilfersdorf	Market town	2,175
Wilhelmsburg	Other city	6,557
Willendorf	Other municipality	971
Wimpassing im Schwarzatale	Market town	1,616
Windigsteig	Market town	945
Winklarn	Other municipality	1,683
Winzendorf-Muthmannsdorf	Market town	1,877
Wölbling	Market town	2,571
Wolfpassing	Other municipality	1,616
Wolfsbach	Market town	2,011
Wolfsgraben	Other municipality	1,700
Wolfsthal	Other municipality	1,032
Wolkersdorf im Weinviertel	Other city	7,201
Wöllersdorf-Steinabrückl	Market town	4,473
Wullersdorf	Market town	2,385
Würflach	Other municipality	1,592
Würmla	Market town	1,429
Ybbs an der Donau	Other city	5,653
Ybbsitz	Market town	3,445
Yspertal	Market town	2,007
Zeillern	Market town	1,865
Zeiselmauer-Wolfpassing	Other municipality	2,302
Zelking-Matzleinsdorf	Other municipality	1,214
Zellerndorf	Market town	2,432
Ziersdorf	Market town	3,446
Zillingdorf	Market town	2,030
Zistersdorf	Other city	5,391
Zöbern	Other municipality	1,423
Zwentendorf an der Donau	Market town	3,982
Zwettl	Other city	10,908
Zwölfaxing	Other municipality	1,744

=== Salzburg ===
Name	Designation	Population (2015)
Abtenau	Market town	5,842
Adnet	Other municipality	3,557
Altenmarkt im Pongau	Market town	4,218
Anif	Other municipality	4,195
Annaberg-Lungötz	Other municipality	2,203
Anthering	Other municipality	3,734
Bad Gastein	Other municipality	3,980
Bad Hofgastein	Market town	6,914
Bad Vigaun	Other municipality	2,091
Bergheim	Other municipality	5,388
Berndorf bei Salzburg	Other municipality	1,689
Bischofshofen	Other city	10,540
Bramberg am Wildkogel	Other municipality	3,936
Bruck an der Großglocknerstraße	Other municipality	4,699
Bürmoos	Other municipality	4,899
Dienten am Hochkönig	Other municipality	761
Dorfbeuern	Other municipality	1,547
Dorfgastein	Other municipality	1,614
Eben im Pongau	Other municipality	2,446
Ebenau	Other municipality	1,439
Elixhausen	Other municipality	2,963
Elsbethen	Other municipality	5,424
Eugendorf	Market town	6,937
Faistenau	Other municipality	3,103
Filzmoos	Other municipality	1,484
Flachau	Other municipality	2,813
Forstau	Other municipality	540
Fusch an der Großglocknerstraße	Other municipality	719
Fuschl am See	Other municipality	1,520
Goldegg	Other municipality	2,533
Golling an der Salzach	Market town	4,271
Göming	Other municipality	764
Göriach	Other municipality	337
Grödig	Market town	7,262
Großarl	Market town	3,825
Großgmain	Other municipality	2,615
Hallein	Other city	21,150
Hallwang	Other municipality	4,189
Henndorf am Wallersee	Other municipality	4,947
Hintersee	Other municipality	443
Hof bei Salzburg	Other municipality	3,562
Hollersbach im Pinzgau	Other municipality	1,220
Hüttau	Other municipality	1,492
Hüttschlag	Other municipality	911
Kaprun	Other municipality	3,177
Kleinarl	Other municipality	792
Koppl	Other municipality	3,472
Köstendorf	Other municipality	2,631
Krimml	Other municipality	847
Krispl	Other municipality	889
Kuchl	Market town	7,274
Lamprechtshausen	Other municipality	4,037
Lend	Other municipality	1,368
Leogang	Other municipality	3,263
Lessach	Other municipality	555
Lofer	Market town	2,037
Maishofen	Other municipality	3,601
Maria Alm	Other municipality	2,197
Mariapfarr	Other municipality	2,375
Mattsee	Market town	3,263
Mauterndorf	Market town	1,639
Mittersill	Other city	5,380
Mühlbach am Hochkönig	Other municipality	1,461
Muhr	Other municipality	510
Neukirchen am Großvenediger	Market town	2,517
Neumarkt am Wallersee	Other city	6,297
Niedernsill	Other municipality	2,694
Nußdorf am Haunsberg	Other municipality	2,383
Oberalm	Market town	4,325
Oberndorf bei Salzburg	Other city	5,815
Obertrum	Market town	4,808
Pfarrwerfen	Other municipality	2,292
Piesendorf	Other municipality	3,790
Plainfeld	Other municipality	1,237
Puch bei Hallein	Other municipality	4,675
Radstadt	Other city	4,823
Ramingstein	Other municipality	1,059
Rauris	Market town	3,044
Rußbach am Paß Gschütt	Other municipality	767
Saalbach-Hinterglemm	Other municipality	2,859
Saalfelden	Other city	16,700
Salzburg	Statutory city	153,377
Sankt Andrä im Lungau	Other municipality	761
Sankt Georgen bei Salzburg	Other municipality	2,954
Sankt Gilgen	Other municipality	3,915
Sankt Johann im Pongau	Other city	10,944
Sankt Koloman	Other municipality	1,725
Sankt Margarethen im Lungau	Other municipality	725
Sankt Martin am Tennengebirge	Other municipality	1,666
Sankt Martin bei Lofer	Other municipality	1,153
Sankt Michael im Lungau	Market town	3,520
Sankt Veit im Pongau	Market town	3,788
Scheffau am Tennengebirge	Other municipality	1,395
Schleedorf	Other municipality	1,069
Schwarzach im Pongau	Market town	3,515
Seeham	Other municipality	1,939
Seekirchen am Wallersee	Other city	10,764
Straßwalchen	Market town	7,420
Strobl	Other municipality	3,645
Stuhlfelden	Other municipality	1,604
Tamsweg	Market town	5,717
Taxenbach	Market town	2,747
Thalgau	Market town	5,931
Thomatal	Other municipality	333
Tweng	Other municipality	276
Unken	Other municipality	1,954
Unternberg	Other municipality	1,035
Untertauern	Other municipality	466
Uttendorf	Other municipality	2,982
Viehhofen	Other municipality	603
Wagrain	Market town	3,085
Wald im Pinzgau	Other municipality	1,124
Wals-Siezenheim	Other municipality	13,056
Weißbach bei Lofer	Other municipality	429
Weißpriach	Other municipality	306
Werfen	Market town	3,027
Werfenweng	Other municipality	1,012
Zederhaus	Other municipality	1,196
Zell am See	Other city	9,852

=== Styria ===
Name	Designation	Population (2022)
Admont	Market town	4,988
Aflenz	Market town	2,423
Aich	Other municipality	1,315
Aigen im Ennstal	Other municipality	2,711
Albersdorf-Prebuch	Other municipality	2,303
Allerheiligen bei Wildon	Other municipality	1,598
Altaussee	Other municipality	1,862
Altenmarkt bei Sankt Gallen	Market town	785
Anger	Market town	4,020
Ardning	Other municipality	1,286
Arnfels	Market town	970
Bad Aussee	Other city	5,013
Bad Blumau	Other municipality	1,631
Bad Gleichenberg	Other municipality	5,306
Bad Loipersdorf	Other municipality	1,821
Bad Mitterndorf	Market town	4,925
Bad Radkersburg	Other city	3,232
Bad Schwanberg	Market town	4,464
Bad Waltersdorf	Market town	3,898
Bärnbach	Other city	5,775
Birkfeld	Market town	4,995
Breitenau am Hochlantsch	Market town	1,612
Bruck an der Mur	Other city	15,962
Buch-Sankt Magdalena	Other municipality	2,196
Burgau	Market town	1,084
Dechantskirchen	Other municipality	2,005
Deutsch Goritz	Other municipality	1,782
Deutschfeistritz	Market town	4,503
Deutschlandsberg	Other city	11,708
Dobl-Zwaring	Market town	3,775
Ebersdorf	Other municipality	1,277
Edelsbach bei Feldbach	Other municipality	1,347
Edelschrott	Market town	1,646
Eggersdorf bei Graz	Market town	7,145
Ehrenhausen an der Weinstraße	Market town	2,455
Eibiswald	Market town	6,416
Eichkögl	Other municipality	1,375
Eisenerz	Other city	3,533
Empersdorf	Other municipality	1,413
Fehring	Other city	7,235
Feistritztal	Other municipality	2,382
Feldbach	Other city	14,430
Feldkirchen bei Graz	Market town	7,253
Fernitz-Mellach	Other municipality	4,931
Fischbach	Other municipality	1,516
Fladnitz an der Teichalm	Other municipality	1,811
Floing	Other municipality	1,218
Fohnsdorf	Other municipality	7,569
Frauental an der Laßnitz	Market town	3,134
Friedberg	Other city	2,652
Frohnleiten	Other city	6,632
Fürstenfeld	Other city	8,853
Gaal	Other municipality	1,337
Gabersdorf	Other municipality	1,294
Gaishorn am See	Market town	1,351
Gamlitz	Market town	3,219
Gasen	Other municipality	856
Geistthal-Södingberg	Other municipality	1,464
Gersdorf an der Feistritz	Other municipality	1,770
Gleinstätten	Market town	2,801
Gleisdorf	Other city	11,322
Gnas	Market town	5,985
Gössendorf	Market town	4,197
Grafendorf bei Hartberg	Market town	3,229
Gralla	Market town	2,852
Gratkorn	Market town	8,391
Gratwein-Straßengel	Market town	12,748
Graz	Statutory city	297,083
Greinbach	Other municipality	1,884
Gröbming	Market town	3,153
Groß Sankt Florian	Market town	4,090
Großklein	Market town	2,285
Großsteinbach	Other municipality	1,290
Großwilfersdorf	Other municipality	2,148
Grundlsee	Other municipality	1,154
Gutenberg-Stenzengreith	Other municipality	1,637
Halbenrain	Market town	1,674
Hart bei Graz	Other municipality	5,440
Hartberg	Other city	6,745
Hartberg Umgebung	Other municipality	2,223
Hartl	Other municipality	2,128
Haselsdorf-Tobelbad	Other municipality	1,599
Haus im Ennstal	Market town	2,425
Hausmannstätten	Market town	3,780
Heiligenkreuz am Waasen	Market town	2,891
Heimschuh	Other municipality	1,984
Hengsberg	Other municipality	1,495
Hirschegg-Pack	Other municipality	1,000
Hitzendorf	Market town	7,338
Hofstätten an der Raab	Other municipality	2,373
Hohentauern	Other municipality	382
Ilz	Market town	3,766
Ilztal	Other municipality	2,191
Irdning-Donnersbachtal	Market town	4,149
Jagerberg	Market town	1,638
Judenburg	Other city	9,637
Kainach bei Voitsberg	Other municipality	1,588
Kainbach bei Graz	Other municipality	2,839
Kaindorf	Market town	3,023
Kalsdorf bei Graz	Market town	8,269
Kalwang	Market town	989
Kammern im Liesingtal	Market town	1,669
Kapfenberg	Other city	22,251
Kapfenstein	Other municipality	1,534
Kindberg	Other city	8,205
Kirchbach-Zerlach	Market town	3,202
Kirchberg an der Raab	Other municipality	4,616
Kitzeck im Sausal	Other municipality	1,179
Klöch	Market town	1,165
Knittelfeld	Other city	12,797
Kobenz	Market town	1,964
Köflach	Other city	9,676
Krakau	Other municipality	1,364
Kraubath an der Mur	Market town	1,347
Krieglach	Market town	5,390
Krottendorf-Gaisfeld	Other municipality	2,468
Kumberg	Market town	3,964
Lafnitz	Other municipality	1,465
Landl	Other municipality	2,560
Lang	Other municipality	1,369
Langenwang	Market town	3,874
Lannach	Market town	3,649
Lassing	Other municipality	1,698
Laßnitzhöhe	Market town	2,823
Lebring-Sankt Margarethen	Market town	2,240
Leibnitz	Other city	13,025
Leoben	Other city	25,057
Leutschach an der Weinstraße	Market town	3,551
Lieboch	Market town	5,514
Liezen	Other city	8,265
Ligist	Market town	3,258
Lobmingtal	Other municipality	1,843
Ludersdorf-Wilfersdorf	Other municipality	2,548
Maria Lankowitz	Market town	2,756
Mariazell	Other city	3,710
Markt Hartmannsdorf	Market town	2,962
Mautern in Steiermark	Market town	1,700
Mettersdorf am Saßbach	Market town	1,344
Michaelerberg-Pruggern	Other municipality	1,221
Miesenbach bei Birkfeld	Other municipality	664
Mitterberg-Sankt Martin	Other municipality	1,934
Mitterdorf an der Raab	Other municipality	2,160
Mooskirchen	Market town	2,197
Mortantsch	Other municipality	2,249
Mühlen	Market town	874
Murau	Other city	3,450
Mureck	Other city	3,484
Mürzzuschlag	Other city	8,102
Naas	Other municipality	1,362
Nestelbach bei Graz	Other municipality	2,753
Neuberg an der Mürz	Market town	2,326
Neudau	Market town	1,527
Neumarkt in der Steiermark	Market town	4,920
Niederwölz	Other municipality	598
Niklasdorf	Market town	2,342
Obdach	Market town	3,790
Oberhaag	Other municipality	2,083
Oberwölz	Other city	2,958
Öblarn	Market town	1,972
Ottendorf an der Rittschein	Other municipality	1,587
Paldau	Market town	3,143
Passail	Market town	4,413
Peggau	Market town	2,408
Pernegg an der Mur	Other municipality	2,544
Pinggau	Market town	3,136
Pirching am Traubenberg	Other municipality	2,557
Pischelsdorf am Kulm	Market town	3,737
Pölfing-Brunn	Market town	1,602
Pöllau	Market town	5,975
Pöllauberg	Other municipality	2,013
Pöls-Oberkurzheim	Market town	2,878
Pölstal	Market town	2,572
Preding	Market town	1,897
Premstätten	Market town	6,823
Proleb	Other municipality	1,576
Puch bei Weiz	Other municipality	2,051
Pusterwald	Other municipality	429
Raaba-Grambach	Market town	4,929
Radmer	Other municipality	501
Ragnitz	Other municipality	1,542
Ramsau am Dachstein	Other municipality	2,900
Ranten	Other municipality	1,126
Ratten	Other municipality	1,080
Rettenegg	Other municipality	691
Riegersburg	Market town	5,018
Rohr bei Hartberg	Other municipality	1,418
Rohrbach an der Lafnitz	Other municipality	2,649
Rosental an der Kainach	Other municipality	1,682
Rottenmann	Other city	5,126
Sankt Andrä-Höch	Other municipality	1,704
Sankt Anna am Aigen	Market town	2,375
Sankt Barbara im Mürztal	Market town	6,524
Sankt Bartholomä	Other municipality	1,496
Sankt Gallen	Market town	1,795
Sankt Georgen am Kreischberg	Other municipality	1,707
Sankt Georgen an der Stiefing	Market town	1,585
Sankt Georgen ob Judenburg	Other municipality	849
Sankt Jakob im Walde	Other municipality	1,013
Sankt Johann im Saggautal	Other municipality	1,991
Sankt Johann in der Haide	Other municipality	2,260
Sankt Josef	Other municipality	1,715
Sankt Kathrein am Hauenstein	Other municipality	4,216
Sankt Kathrein am Offenegg	Other municipality	1,056
Sankt Lambrecht	Market town	1,824
Sankt Lorenzen am Wechsel	Other municipality	1,420
Sankt Lorenzen im Mürztal	Market town	3,781
Sankt Marein bei Graz	Market town	3,751
Sankt Marein im Mürztal	Market town	2,822
Sankt Marein-Feistritz	Other municipality	2,025
Sankt Margarethen an der Raab	Market town	1,996
Sankt Margarethen bei Knittelfeld	Other municipality	2,643
Sankt Martin am Wöllmißberg	Other municipality	798
Sankt Martin im Sulmtal	Other municipality	3,027
Sankt Michael in Obersteiermark	Market town	3,129
Sankt Nikolai im Sausal	Market town	2,306
Sankt Oswald bei Plankenwarth	Other municipality	1,282
Sankt Peter am Kammersberg	Market town	4,488
Sankt Peter am Ottersbach	Market town	2,907
Sankt Peter im Sulmtal	Other municipality	1,271
Sankt Peter ob Judenburg	Other municipality	1,116
Sankt Peter-Freienstein	Market town	2,323
Sankt Radegund bei Graz	Other municipality	2,176
Sankt Ruprecht an der Raab	Market town	5,670
Sankt Stefan im Rosental	Market town	3,824
Sankt Stefan ob Leoben	Other municipality	1,832
Sankt Stefan ob Stainz	Other municipality	3,630
Sankt Veit in der Südsteiermark	Market town	1,350
Schäffern	Other municipality	2,145
Scheifling	Market town	6,571
Schladming	Other city	893
Schöder	Other municipality	2,338
Schwarzautal	Market town	1,338
Seckau	Market town	12,072
Seiersberg-Pirka	Other municipality	1,501
Selzthal	Other municipality	3,232
Semriach	Market town	4,506
Sinabelkirchen	Market town	1,459
Söchau	Other municipality	4,255
Söding-Sankt Johann	Other municipality	1,477
Sölk	Other municipality	5,320
Spielberg	Other city	1,804
Spital am Semmering	Other municipality	628
Stadl-Predlitz	Other municipality	1,644
Stainach-Pürgg	Market town	2,773
Stainz	Market town	8,679
Stallhofen	Market town	3,190
Stanz im Mürztal	Other municipality	1,808
Stattegg	Other municipality	3,029
Stiwoll	Other municipality	711
Straden	Market town	3,495
Strallegg	Other municipality	1,901
Straß in Steiermark	Market town	6,409
Stubenberg	Other municipality	2,239
Teufenbach-Katsch	Other municipality	1,831
Thal	Market town	2,457
Thannhausen	Other municipality	2,501
Thörl	Market town	2,190
Tieschen	Market town	1,226
Tillmitsch	Other municipality	3,721
Traboch	Other municipality	1,414
Tragöß-Sankt Katharein	Other municipality	1,789
Trieben	Other city	3,337
Trofaiach	Other city	11,053
Turnau	Market town	1,566
Übelbach	Market town	2,088
Unterlamm	Other municipality	1,252
Unzmarkt-Frauenburg	Market town	1,276
Vasoldsberg	Market town	4,772
Voitsberg	Other city	9,507
Vorau	Market town	4,651
Vordernberg	Market town	929
Wagna	Market town	6,479
Wald am Schoberpaß	Other municipality	543
Waldbach-Mönichwald	Other municipality	1,406
Weinitzen	Other municipality	2,716
Weißkirchen in Steiermark	Market town	4,844
Weiz	Other city	11,940
Wenigzell	Other municipality	1,409
Werndorf	Other municipality	2,751
Wettmannstätten	Market town	1,659
Wies	Market town	4,271
Wildalpen	Other municipality	436
Wildon	Market town	5,745
Wörschach	Other municipality	1,165
Wundschuh	Other municipality	1,665
Zeltweg	Other city	7,081

=== Tyrol ===
Name	Designation	Population (2015)
Abfaltersbach	Other municipality	630
Absam	Other municipality	7,112
Achenkirch	Other municipality	2,185
Ainet	Other municipality	936
Aldrans	Other municipality	2,684
Alpbach	Other municipality	2,561
Amlach	Other municipality	489
Ampass	Other municipality	1,827
Angath	Other municipality	1,008
Angerberg	Other municipality	1,890
Anras	Other municipality	1,233
Arzl im Pitztal	Other municipality	3,134
Aschau im Zillertal	Other municipality	1,866
Assling	Other municipality	1,769
Aurach bei Kitzbühel	Other municipality	1,130
Außervillgraten	Other municipality	760
Axams	Other municipality	5,996
Bach	Other municipality	614
Bad Häring	Other municipality	2,777
Baumkirchen	Other municipality	1,284
Berwang	Other municipality	565
Biberwier	Other municipality	628
Bichlbach	Other municipality	788
Birgitz	Other municipality	1,419
Brandberg	Other municipality	354
Brandenberg	Other municipality	1,523
Breitenbach am Inn	Other municipality	3,475
Breitenwang	Other municipality	1,423
Brixen im Thale	Other municipality	2,639
Brixlegg	Market town	2,970
Bruck am Ziller	Other municipality	1,098
Buch in Tirol	Other municipality	2,548
Dölsach	Other municipality	2,338
Ebbs	Other municipality	5,601
Eben am Achensee	Other municipality	3,180
Ehenbichl	Other municipality	824
Ehrwald	Other municipality	2,593
Elbigenalp	Other municipality	889
Ellbögen	Other municipality	1,109
Ellmau	Other municipality	2,828
Elmen	Other municipality	373
Erl	Other municipality	1,540
Faggen	Other municipality	383
Fendels	Other municipality	259
Fieberbrunn	Market town	4,287
Finkenberg	Other municipality	1,421
Fiss	Other municipality	1,009
Flaurling	Other municipality	1,285
Fließ	Other municipality	3,019
Flirsch	Other municipality	990
Forchach	Other municipality	259
Fritzens	Other municipality	2,148
Fügen	Other municipality	4,169
Fügenberg	Other municipality	1,405
Fulpmes	Market town	4,378
Gaimberg	Other municipality	822
Gallzein	Other municipality	668
Galtür	Other municipality	765
Gerlos	Other municipality	790
Gerlosberg	Other municipality	465
Gnadenwald	Other municipality	826
Going am Wilden Kaiser	Other municipality	1,849
Götzens	Other municipality	4,062
Gramais	Other municipality	45
Grän	Other municipality	599
Gries am Brenner	Other municipality	1,361
Gries im Sellrain	Other municipality	610
Grins	Other municipality	1,398
Grinzens	Other municipality	1,399
Gschnitz	Other municipality	434
Haiming	Other municipality	4,659
Hainzenberg	Other municipality	731
Hall in Tirol	Other city	13,897
Hart im Zillertal	Other municipality	1,587
Häselgehr	Other municipality	690
Hatting	Other municipality	1,444
Heinfels	Other municipality	977
Heiterwang	Other municipality	532
Hinterhornbach	Other municipality	92
Hippach	Other municipality	1,455
Hochfilzen	Other municipality	1,196
Höfen	Other municipality	1,200
Holzgau	Other municipality	412
Hopfgarten im Brixental	Market town	5,677
Hopfgarten in Defereggen	Other municipality	704
Imst	Other city	10,504
Imsterberg	Other municipality	777
Innervillgraten	Other municipality	938
Innsbruck	Statutory city	132,493
Inzing	Other municipality	3,847
Ischgl	Other municipality	1,593
Iselsberg-Stronach	Other municipality	596
Itter	Other municipality	1,150
Jenbach	Market town	7,120
Jerzens	Other municipality	975
Jochberg	Other municipality	1,577
Jungholz	Other municipality	301
Kaisers	Other municipality	76
Kals am Großglockner	Other municipality	1,142
Kaltenbach	Other municipality	1,313
Kappl	Other municipality	2,617
Karres	Other municipality	609
Karrösten	Other municipality	676
Kartitsch	Other municipality	803
Kaunerberg	Other municipality	437
Kaunertal	Other municipality	597
Kauns	Other municipality	502
Kematen in Tirol	Other municipality	2,931
Kirchberg in Tirol	Other municipality	5,245
Kirchbichl	Other municipality	5,855
Kirchdorf in Tirol	Other municipality	3,936
Kitzbühel	Other city	8,272
Kolsass	Other municipality	1,626
Kolsassberg	Other municipality	817
Kössen	Other municipality	4,346
Kramsach	Other municipality	4,891
Kufstein	Other city	19,223
Kundl	Market town	4,464
Ladis	Other municipality	531
Landeck	Other city	7,725
Längenfeld	Other municipality	4,611
Langkampfen	Other municipality	4,108
Lans	Other municipality	1,096
Lavant	Other municipality	320
Lechaschau	Other municipality	2,108
Leisach	Other municipality	729
Lermoos	Other municipality	1,156
Leutasch	Other municipality	2,380
Lienz	Other city	11,844
Mariastein	Other municipality	362
Matrei am Brenner	Market town	959
Matrei in Osttirol	Market town	4,667
Mayrhofen	Market town	3,858
Mieders	Other municipality	1,861
Mieming	Other municipality	3,698
Mils	Other municipality	4,377
Mils bei Imst	Other municipality	559
Mötz	Other municipality	1,219
Mühlbachl	Other municipality	1,393
Münster	Other municipality	3,317
Musau	Other municipality	391
Mutters	Other municipality	2,202
Namlos	Other municipality	72
Nassereith	Other municipality	2,119
Natters	Other municipality	2,020
Nauders	Other municipality	1,542
Navis	Other municipality	2,004
Nesselwängle	Other municipality	455
Neustift im Stubaital	Other municipality	4,747
Niederndorf	Other municipality	2,736
Niederndorferberg	Other municipality	706
Nikolsdorf	Other municipality	894
Nußdorf-Debant	Market town	3,325
Oberhofen im Inntal	Other municipality	1,857
Oberlienz	Other municipality	1,485
Obernberg am Brenner	Other municipality	363
Oberndorf in Tirol	Other municipality	2,194
Oberperfuss	Other municipality	3,043
Obertilliach	Other municipality	666
Obsteig	Other municipality	1,316
Oetz	Other municipality	2,402
Patsch	Other municipality	1,014
Pettnau	Other municipality	1,047
Pettneu am Arlberg	Other municipality	1,494
Pfaffenhofen	Other municipality	1,102
Pfafflar	Other municipality	112
Pflach	Other municipality	1,397
Pfons	Other municipality	1,205
Pfunds	Other municipality	2,602
Pians	Other municipality	813
Pill	Other municipality	1,174
Pinswang	Other municipality	412
Polling in Tirol	Other municipality	1,130
Prägraten am Großvenediger	Other municipality	1,149
Prutz	Other municipality	1,825
Radfeld	Other municipality	2,495
Ramsau im Zillertal	Other municipality	1,617
Ranggen	Other municipality	1,072
Rattenberg	Other city	411
Reith bei Kitzbühel	Other municipality	1,662
Reith bei Seefeld	Other municipality	1,370
Reith im Alpbachtal	Other municipality	2,722
Rettenschöss	Other municipality	513
Reutte	Market town	6,704
Ried im Oberinntal	Other municipality	1,261
Ried im Zillertal	Other municipality	1,280
Rietz	Other municipality	2,313
Rinn	Other municipality	1,877
Rohrberg	Other municipality	574
Roppen	Other municipality	1,800
Rum	Market town	9,190
Sautens	Other municipality	1,601
Scharnitz	Other municipality	1,403
Schattwald	Other municipality	437
Scheffau am Wilden Kaiser	Other municipality	1,449
Schlaiten	Other municipality	474
Schlitters	Other municipality	1,481
Schmirn	Other municipality	872
Schönberg im Stubaital	Other municipality	1,101
Schönwies	Other municipality	1,697
Schwaz	Other city	13,728
Schwendau	Other municipality	1,725
Schwendt	Other municipality	823
Schwoich	Other municipality	2,515
See	Other municipality	1,265
Seefeld in Tirol	Other municipality	3,440
Sellrain	Other municipality	1,333
Serfaus	Other municipality	1,134
Sillian	Market town	2,051
Silz	Other municipality	2,560
Sistrans	Other municipality	2,255
Sölden	Other municipality	3,145
Söll	Other municipality	3,631
Spiss	Other municipality	114
Sankt Anton am Arlberg	Other municipality	2,372
Sankt Jakob in Defereggen	Other municipality	848
Sankt Jakob in Haus	Other municipality	791
Sankt Johann im Walde	Other municipality	285
Sankt Johann in Tirol	Market town	9,428
Sankt Leonhard im Pitztal	Other municipality	1,382
Sankt Sigmund im Sellrain	Other municipality	175
Sankt Ulrich am Pillersee	Other municipality	1,819
Sankt Veit in Defereggen	Other municipality	670
Stams	Other municipality	1,495
Stans	Other municipality	2,035
Stanz bei Landeck	Other municipality	577
Stanzach	Other municipality	455
Steeg	Other municipality	671
Steinach am Brenner	Market town	3,622
Steinberg am Rofan	Other municipality	286
Strass im Zillertal	Other municipality	836
Strassen	Other municipality	808
Strengen	Other municipality	1,213
Stumm	Other municipality	1,885
Stummerberg	Other municipality	844
Tannheim	Other municipality	1,067
Tarrenz	Other municipality	2,744
Telfes	Other municipality	1,570
Telfs	Market town	15,747
Terfens	Other municipality	2,184
Thaur	Other municipality	3,979
Thiersee	Other municipality	2,990
Thurn	Other municipality	608
Tobadill	Other municipality	516
Tösens	Other municipality	728
Trins	Other municipality	1,277
Tristach	Other municipality	1,437
Tulfes	Other municipality	1,550
Tux	Other municipality	1,941
Uderns	Other municipality	1,845
Umhausen	Other municipality	3,220
Unterperfuss	Other municipality	224
Untertilliach	Other municipality	237
Vals	Other municipality	532
Vils	Other city	1,535
Virgen	Other municipality	2,199
Volders	Other municipality	4,464
Völs	Market town	6,738
Vomp	Market town	5,146
Vorderhornbach	Other municipality	245
Waidring	Other municipality	2,019
Walchsee	Other municipality	1,878
Wängle	Other municipality	931
Wattenberg	Other municipality	739
Wattens	Market town	7,881
Weer	Other municipality	1,539
Weerberg	Other municipality	2,482
Weißenbach am Lech	Other municipality	1,250
Wenns	Other municipality	2,044
Westendorf	Other municipality	3,652
Wiesing	Other municipality	2,124
Wildermieming	Other municipality	935
Wildschönau	Other municipality	4,242
Wörgl	Other city	13,811
Zams	Other municipality	3,409
Zell am Ziller	Market town	1,758
Zellberg	Other municipality	648
Zirl	Market town	8,162
Zöblen	Other municipality	231

=== Upper Austria ===
Name	Designation	Population (2015)
Adlwang	Other municipality	1,806
Afiesl	Other municipality	394
Ahorn	Other municipality	505
Aichkirchen	Other municipality	582
Aigen-Schlägl	Market town	3,212
Aistersheim	Other municipality	892
Alberndorf in der Riedmark	Other municipality	4,083
Alkoven	Other municipality	5,961
Allerheiligen im Mühlkreis	Other municipality	1,261
Allhaming	Other municipality	1,174
Altenberg bei Linz	Market town	4,553
Altenfelden	Market town	2,219
Altheim	Other city	4,839
Altmünster	Market town	9,793
Altschwendt	Other municipality	700
Ampflwang im Hausruckwald	Market town	3,376
Andorf	Market town	5,174
Andrichsfurt	Other municipality	770
Ansfelden	Other city	16,194
Antiesenhofen	Other municipality	1,091
Arbing	Other municipality	1,446
Arnreit	Other municipality	1,154
Aschach an der Donau	Market town	2,201
Aschach an der Steyr	Other municipality	2,266
Aspach	Market town	2,596
Asten	Market town	6,613
Attersee am Attersee	Other municipality	1,585
Attnang-Puchheim	Other city	8,944
Atzbach	Other municipality	1,196
Atzesberg	Other municipality	446
Auberg	Other municipality	551
Auerbach	Other municipality	583
Aurach am Hongar	Other municipality	1,715
Aurolzmünster	Market town	3,000
Bachmanning	Other municipality	704
Bad Goisern am Hallstättersee	Market town	7,450
Bad Hall	Other city	5,296
Bad Ischl	Other city	14,133
Bad Kreuzen	Market town	2,266
Bad Leonfelden	Other city	4,180
Bad Schallerbach	Market town	4,169
Bad Wimsbach-Neydharting	Market town	2,533
Bad Zell	Market town	2,919
Baumgartenberg	Market town	1,734
Berg im Attergau	Other municipality	1,044
Braunau am Inn	Other city	17,095
Brunnenthal	Other municipality	2,032
Buchkirchen	Market town	4,038
Burgkirchen	Other municipality	2,661
Desselbrunn	Other municipality	1,857
Diersbach	Other municipality	1,583
Dietach	Other municipality	3,212
Dimbach	Market town	1,013
Dorf an der Pram	Other municipality	1,039
Ebensee am Traunsee	Market town	7,717
Eberschwang	Market town	3,351
Eberstalzell	Other municipality	2,627
Edlbach	Other municipality	670
Edt bei Lambach	Other municipality	2,197
Eferding	Other city	4,100
Eggelsberg	Market town	2,365
Eggendorf im Traunkreis	Other municipality	944
Eggerding	Other municipality	1,320
Eidenberg	Other municipality	2,105
Eitzing	Other municipality	805
Engelhartszell	Market town	942
Engerwitzdorf	Other municipality	8,790
Enns	Other city	11,937
Enzenkirchen	Other municipality	1,772
Eschenau im Hausruckkreis	Other municipality	1,063
Esternberg	Other municipality	2,855
Feldkirchen an der Donau	Market town	5,361
Feldkirchen bei Mattighofen	Other municipality	1,978
Fischlham	Other municipality	1,328
Fornach	Other municipality	976
Fraham	Other municipality	2,395
Frankenburg am Hausruck	Market town	4,842
Frankenmarkt	Market town	3,636
Franking	Other municipality	953
Freinberg	Other municipality	1,458
Freistadt	Other city	7,909
Gaflenz	Market town	1,954
Gallneukirchen	Other city	6,492
Gallspach	Market town	2,772
Gampern	Other municipality	2,927
Garsten	Market town	6,711
Gaspoltshofen	Market town	3,566
Geboltskirchen	Other municipality	1,421
Geiersberg	Other municipality	519
Geinberg	Other municipality	1,435
Geretsberg	Other municipality	1,187
Gilgenberg am Weilhart	Other municipality	1,327
Gmunden	Other city	13,191
Goldwörth	Other municipality	840
Gosau	Other municipality	1,792
Gramastetten	Market town	5,102
Grein	Other city	2,926
Grieskirchen	Other city	5,002
Großraming	Other municipality	2,702
Grünau im Almtal	Other municipality	2,064
Grünbach	Other municipality	1,946
Grünburg	Other municipality	3,840
Gschwandt	Other municipality	2,750
Gunskirchen	Market town	6,037
Gurten	Other municipality	1,187
Gutau	Market town	2,724
Haag am Hausruck	Market town	2,176
Hagenberg im Mühlkreis	Market town	2,737
Haibach im Mühlkreis	Other municipality	904
Haibach ob der Donau	Other municipality	1,308
Haigermoos	Other municipality	610
Hallstatt	Market town	778
Handenberg	Other municipality	1,290
Hargelsberg	Other municipality	1,371
Hartkirchen	Other municipality	4,099
Haslach an der Mühl	Market town	2,536
Heiligenberg	Other municipality	691
Helfenberg	Other municipality	1,005
Hellmonsödt	Market town	2,303
Helpfau-Uttendorf	Market town	3,573
Herzogsdorf	Market town	2,506
Hinterstoder	Other municipality	910
Hinzenbach	Other municipality	1,999
Hirschbach im Mühlkreis	Other municipality	1,194
Hochburg-Ach	Other municipality	3,236
Hofkirchen an der Trattnach	Market town	1,667
Hofkirchen im Mühlkreis	Market town	1,520
Hofkirchen im Traunkreis	Other municipality	1,899
Hohenzell	Other municipality	2,246
Höhnhart	Other municipality	1,379
Holzhausen	Other municipality	995
Hörbich	Other municipality	420
Hörsching	Market town	6,062
Innerschwand am Mondsee	Other municipality	1,183
Inzersdorf im Kremstal	Other municipality	1,880
Jeging	Other municipality	691
Julbach	Other municipality	1,537
Kallham	Other municipality	2,498
Kaltenberg	Other municipality	625
Katsdorf	Other municipality	3,086
Kefermarkt	Market town	2,116
Kematen am Innbach	Market town	1,413
Kematen an der Krems	Other municipality	2,790
Kirchberg bei Mattighofen	Other municipality	1,175
Kirchberg ob der Donau	Other municipality	1,055
Kirchberg-Thening	Other municipality	2,364
Kirchdorf am Inn	Other municipality	636
Kirchdorf an der Krems	Other city	4,502
Kirchham	Other municipality	2,139
Kirchheim im Innkreis	Other municipality	716
Kirchschlag bei Linz	Other municipality	2,138
Klaffer am Hochficht	Other municipality	1,311
Klam	Market town	918
Klaus an der Pyhrnbahn	Other municipality	1,063
Kleinzell im Mühlkreis	Other municipality	1,546
Kollerschlag	Market town	1,520
Königswiesen	Market town	3,113
Kopfing im Innkreis	Market town	2,008
Kremsmünster	Market town	6,585
Krenglbach	Other municipality	3,158
Kronstorf	Market town	3,389
Laakirchen	Other city	9,861
Lambach	Market town	3,435
Lambrechten	Other municipality	1,300
Langenstein	Other municipality	2,534
Lasberg	Market town	2,748
Laussa	Other municipality	1,227
Lembach im Mühlkreis	Market town	1,530
Lengau	Other municipality	4,738
Lenzing	Market town	5,043
Leonding	Other city	28,698
Leopoldschlag	Market town	1,023
Lichtenau im Mühlkreis	Other municipality	498
Lichtenberg	Other municipality	2,637
Liebenau	Market town	1,597
Linz	Statutory city	204,846
Lochen am See	Other municipality	2,754
Lohnsburg am Kobernaußerwald	Market town	2,234
Losenstein	Other municipality	1,604
Luftenberg an der Donau	Market town	4,057
Manning	Other municipality	795
Marchtrenk	Other city	13,603
Maria Neustift	Other municipality	1,592
Maria Schmolln	Other municipality	1,414
Mattighofen	Other city	6,524
Mauerkirchen	Market town	2,566
Mauthausen	Market town	4,936
Mayrhof	Other municipality	322
Meggenhofen	Other municipality	1,514
Mehrnbach	Other municipality	2,363
Mettmach	Market town	2,355
Michaelnbach	Other municipality	1,263
Micheldorf in Oberösterreich	Market town	5,854
Mining	Other municipality	1,195
Mitterkirchen im Machland	Market town	1,718
Molln	Market town	3,653
Mondsee	Market town	3,734
Moosbach	Other municipality	1,042
Moosdorf	Other municipality	1,638
Mörschwang	Other municipality	328
Mühlheim am Inn	Other municipality	661
Munderfing	Other municipality	3,063
Münzbach	Market town	1,814
Münzkirchen	Market town	2,572
Naarn im Machlande	Market town	3,690
Natternbach	Market town	2,305
Nebelberg	Other municipality	632
Neufelden	Market town	1,276
Neuhofen an der Krems	Market town	6,269
Neuhofen im Innkreis	Other municipality	2,408
Neukirchen am Walde	Market town	1,633
Neukirchen an der Enknach	Other municipality	2,212
Neukirchen an der Vöckla	Other municipality	2,559
Neukirchen bei Lambach	Other municipality	917
Neumarkt im Hausruckkreis	Market town	1,465
Neumarkt im Mühlkreis	Market town	3,163
Neustift im Mühlkreis	Other municipality	1,461
Niederkappel	Other municipality	985
Niederneukirchen	Other municipality	2,073
Niederthalheim	Other municipality	1,125
Niederwaldkirchen	Market town	1,816
Nußbach	Other municipality	2,286
Nußdorf am Attersee	Other municipality	1,128
Oberhofen am Irrsee	Other municipality	1,646
Oberkappel	Market town	725
Obernberg am Inn	Market town	1,633
Oberndorf bei Schwanenstadt	Other municipality	1,416
Oberneukirchen	Market town	3,202
Oberschlierbach	Other municipality	484
Obertraun	Other municipality	726
Oberwang	Other municipality	1,708
Oepping	Other municipality	1,510
Offenhausen	Market town	1,638
Oftering	Other municipality	2,076
Ohlsdorf	Other municipality	5,209
Ort im Innkreis	Other municipality	1,275
Ostermiething	Market town	3,296
Ottenschlag im Mühlkreis	Other municipality	539
Ottensheim	Market town	4,721
Ottnang am Hausruck	Market town	3,990
Pabneukirchen	Market town	1,706
Palting	Other municipality	938
Pasching	Other municipality	7,552
Pattigham	Other municipality	928
Peilstein im Mühlviertel	Market town	1,541
Pennewang	Other municipality	888
Perg	Other city	8,388
Perwang am Grabensee	Other municipality	997
Peterskirchen	Other municipality	700
Pettenbach	Market town	5,272
Peuerbach	Other city	4,483
Pfaffing	Other municipality	1,482
Pfaffstätt	Other municipality	1,101
Pfarrkirchen bei Bad Hall	Other municipality	2,244
Pfarrkirchen im Mühlkreis	Other municipality	1,474
Piberbach	Other municipality	1,902
Pichl bei Wels	Market town	2,863
Pierbach	Other municipality	1,011
Pilsbach	Other municipality	629
Pinsdorf	Other municipality	3,849
Pischelsdorf am Engelbach	Other municipality	1,672
Pitzenberg	Other municipality	524
Pollham	Other municipality	984
Polling im Innkreis	Other municipality	997
Pöndorf	Other municipality	2,386
Pötting	Other municipality	541
Pram	Market town	1,708
Prambachkirchen	Market town	2,919
Pramet	Other municipality	1,030
Pregarten	Other city	5,293
Puchenau	Other municipality	4,445
Puchkirchen am Trattberg	Other municipality	1,036
Pucking	Market town	3,904
Pühret	Other municipality	613
Pupping	Other municipality	1,824
Putzleinsdorf	Market town	1,553
Raab	Market town	2,270
Rainbach im Innkreis	Other municipality	1,478
Rainbach im Mühlkreis	Market town	2,959
Rechberg	Other municipality	996
Redleiten	Other municipality	537
Redlham	Other municipality	1,515
Regau	Market town	6,780
Reichenau im Mühlkreis	Market town	1,329
Reichenthal	Market town	1,513
Reichersberg	Market town	1,511
Reichraming	Other municipality	1,742
Ried im Innkreis	Other city	11,903
Ried im Traunkreis	Other municipality	2,739
Ried in der Riedmark	Market town	4,210
Riedau	Market town	2,069
Rohr im Kremstal	Other municipality	1,374
Rohrbach-Berg	Other city	5,134
Roitham am Traunfall	Other municipality	2,001
Rosenau am Hengstpaß	Other municipality	663
Roßbach	Other municipality	935
Roßleithen	Other municipality	1,889
Rottenbach	Other municipality	1,105
Rüstorf	Other municipality	2,104
Rutzenham	Other municipality	298
Sandl	Other municipality	1,384
Sarleinsbach	Market town	2,284
Sattledt	Market town	2,668
Saxen	Market town	1,820
Schalchen	Other municipality	3,877
Schardenberg	Market town	2,407
Schärding	Other city	5,253
Scharnstein	Market town	4,819
Scharten	Other municipality	2,252
Schenkenfelden	Market town	1,569
Schiedlberg	Other municipality	1,224
Schildorn	Other municipality	1,227
Schlatt	Other municipality	1,399
Schleißheim	Other municipality	1,389
Schlierbach	Other municipality	2,858
Schlüßlberg	Market town	3,091
Schönau im Mühlkreis	Other municipality	1,941
Schörfling am Attersee	Market town	3,438
Schwand im Innkreis	Other municipality	972
Schwanenstadt	Other city	4,264
Schwarzenberg am Böhmerwald	Other municipality	566
Schwertberg	Market town	5,365
Seewalchen am Attersee	Market town	5,491
Senftenbach	Other municipality	772
Sierning	Market town	9,371
Sigharting	Other municipality	848
Sipbachzell	Other municipality	1,975
Sonnberg im Mühlkreis	Other municipality	966
Spital am Pyhrn	Other municipality	2,238
Sankt Aegidi	Other municipality	1,556
Sankt Agatha	Other municipality	2,116
Sankt Florian	Market town	6,176
Sankt Florian am Inn	Market town	3,150
Sankt Georgen am Fillmannsbach	Other municipality	404
Sankt Georgen am Walde	Market town	2,006
Sankt Georgen an der Gusen	Market town	4,119
Sankt Georgen bei Grieskirchen	Other municipality	1,336
Sankt Georgen bei Obernberg am Inn	Other municipality	569
Sankt Georgen im Attergau	Market town	4,375
Sankt Gotthard im Mühlkreis	Other municipality	1,332
Sankt Johann am Walde	Other municipality	2,051
Sankt Johann am Wimberg	Other municipality	1,029
Sankt Konrad	Other municipality	1,115
Sankt Leonhard bei Freistadt	Market town	1,394
Sankt Lorenz	Other municipality	2,493
Sankt Marien	Other municipality	4,769
Sankt Marienkirchen am Hausruck	Other municipality	888
Sankt Marienkirchen an der Polsenz	Market town	2,337
Sankt Marienkirchen bei Schärding	Other municipality	1,832
Sankt Martin im Innkreis	Market town	2,055
Sankt Martin im Mühlkreis	Market town	3,757
Sankt Nikola an der Donau	Market town	798
Sankt Oswald bei Freistadt	Market town	2,901
Sankt Oswald bei Haslach	Other municipality	501
Sankt Pankraz	Other municipality	362
Sankt Pantaleon	Other municipality	3,085
Sankt Peter am Hart	Other municipality	2,447
Sankt Peter am Wimberg	Market town	1,770
Sankt Radegund	Other municipality	589
Sankt Roman	Other municipality	1,711
Sankt Stefan am Walde	Other municipality	804
Sankt Thomas	Other municipality	545
Sankt Thomas am Blasenstein	Market town	927
Sankt Ulrich bei Steyr	Other municipality	2,969
Sankt Ulrich im Mühlkreis	Other municipality	633
Sankt Veit im Innkreis	Other municipality	408
Sankt Veit im Mühlkreis	Other municipality	1,206
Sankt Willibald	Other municipality	1,100
Sankt Wolfgang im Salzkammergut	Market town	2,770
Stadl-Paura	Market town	5,053
Steegen	Other municipality	1,049
Steinbach am Attersee	Other municipality	866
Steinbach am Ziehberg	Other municipality	828
Steinbach an der Steyr	Other municipality	2,009
Steinerkirchen an der Traun	Market town	2,371
Steinhaus	Other municipality	2,187
Steyr	Statutory city	38,331
Steyregg	Other city	4,889
Straß im Attergau	Other municipality	1,471
Stroheim	Other municipality	1,555
Suben	Other municipality	1,508
Taiskirchen im Innkreis	Market town	2,407
Tarsdorf	Other municipality	2,068
Taufkirchen an der Pram	Market town	2,925
Taufkirchen an der Trattnach	Market town	1,970
Ternberg	Market town	3,367
Thalheim bei Wels	Market town	5,482
Tiefgraben	Other municipality	3,974
Timelkam	Market town	5,708
Tollet	Other municipality	920
Tragwein	Market town	3,082
Traun	Other city	24,477
Traunkirchen	Other municipality	1,624
Treubach	Other municipality	725
Tumeltsham	Other municipality	1,590
Überackern	Other municipality	685
Ulrichsberg	Market town	2,843
Ungenach	Other municipality	1,492
Unterach am Attersee	Other municipality	1,448
Unterweißenbach	Market town	2,192
Unterweitersdorf	Other municipality	2,082
Utzenaich	Other municipality	1,536
Vichtenstein	Other municipality	611
Vöcklabruck	Other city	12,299
Vöcklamarkt	Market town	4,924
Vorchdorf	Market town	7,475
Vorderstoder	Other municipality	810
Vorderweißenbach	Market town	2,653
Waizenkirchen	Market town	3,729
Waldburg	Other municipality	1,375
Waldhausen im Strudengau	Market town	2,870
Walding	Market town	4,095
Waldkirchen am Wesen	Other municipality	1,171
Waldneukirchen	Other municipality	2,242
Waldzell	Other municipality	2,177
Wallern an der Trattnach	Market town	3,039
Wartberg an der Krems	Market town	2,993
Wartberg ob der Aist	Market town	4,222
Weibern	Other municipality	1,717
Weilbach	Other municipality	604
Weißenkirchen im Attergau	Other municipality	964
Weißkirchen an der Traun	Other municipality	3,430
Weitersfelden	Market town	1,042
Wels	Statutory city	61,233
Wendling	Other municipality	838
Weng im Innkreis	Other municipality	1,394
Wernstein am Inn	Other municipality	1,566
Weyer	Market town	4,258
Weyregg am Attersee	Other municipality	1,588
Wilhering	Market town	5,911
Windhaag bei Freistadt	Market town	1,579
Windhaag bei Perg	Other municipality	1,508
Windischgarsten	Market town	2,392
Wippenham	Other municipality	578
Wolfern	Market town	3,173
Wolfsegg am Hausruck	Market town	1,982
Zell am Moos	Other municipality	1,575
Zell am Pettenfirst	Other municipality	1,236
Zell an der Pram	Other municipality	2,021
Zwettl an der Rodl	Market town	1,752

=== Vienna ===
Name	Designation	Population (2026)
Vienna	Statutory city	2,042,036

=== Vorarlberg ===
Name	Designation	Population (2015)
Alberschwende	Other municipality	3,247
Altach	Other municipality	6,624
Andelsbuch	Other municipality	2,565
Au	Other municipality	1,736
Bartholomäberg	Other municipality	2,352
Bezau	Market town	2,003
Bildstein	Other municipality	766
Bizau	Other municipality	1,107
Blons	Other municipality	349
Bludenz	Other city	14,539
Bludesch	Other municipality	2,386
Brand	Other municipality	719
Bregenz	Other city	29,806
Buch	Other municipality	596
Bürs	Other municipality	3,275
Bürserberg	Other municipality	572
Dalaas	Other municipality	1,597
Damüls	Other municipality	313
Doren	Other municipality	1,029
Dornbirn	Other city	49,278
Düns	Other municipality	411
Dünserberg	Other municipality	147
Egg	Other municipality	3,547
Eichenberg	Other municipality	427
Feldkirch	Other city	33,420
Fontanella	Other municipality	437
Frastanz	Market town	6,434
Fraxern	Other municipality	701
Fußach	Other municipality	3,871
Gaißau	Other municipality	1,827
Gemeinde Gaschurn-Partenen	Other municipality	1,464
Göfis	Other municipality	3,312
Götzis	Market town	11,473
Hard	Market town	13,495
Hittisau	Other municipality	2,032
Höchst	Other municipality	7,995
Hohenems	Other city	16,317
Hohenweiler	Other municipality	1,271
Hörbranz	Market town	6,346
Innerbraz	Other municipality	994
Kennelbach	Other municipality	1,944
Klaus	Other municipality	3,118
Klösterle	Other municipality	688
Koblach	Other municipality	4,577
Krumbach	Other municipality	1,042
Langen bei Bregenz	Other municipality	1,405
Langenegg	Other municipality	1,133
Laterns	Other municipality	662
Lauterach	Market town	10,267
Lech	Other municipality	1,568
Lingenau	Other municipality	1,466
Lochau	Other municipality	5,747
Lorüns	Other municipality	294
Ludesch	Other municipality	3,437
Lustenau	Market town	22,821
Mäder	Other municipality	4,031
Meiningen	Other municipality	2,245
Mellau	Other municipality	1,301
Mittelberg	Other municipality	4,962
Möggers	Other municipality	534
Nenzing	Market town	6,239
Nüziders	Other municipality	4,962
Raggal	Other municipality	868
Rankweil	Market town	11,855
Reuthe	Other municipality	658
Riefensberg	Other municipality	1,086
Röns	Other municipality	352
Röthis	Other municipality	1,942
Satteins	Other municipality	2,703
Schlins	Other municipality	2,404
Schnepfau	Other municipality	449
Schnifis	Other municipality	798
Schoppernau	Other municipality	950
Schröcken	Other municipality	224
Schruns	Market town	3,818
Schwarzach	Other municipality	3,949
Schwarzenberg	Other municipality	1,850
Sibratsgfäll	Other municipality	401
Silbertal	Other municipality	834
Sonntag	Other municipality	671
Sankt Anton im Montafon	Other municipality	715
Sankt Gallenkirch	Other municipality	2,246
Sankt Gerold	Other municipality	410
Stallehr	Other municipality	289
Sulz	Other municipality	2,527
Sulzberg	Other municipality	1,818
Thüringen	Other municipality	2,222
Thüringerberg	Other municipality	714
Tschagguns	Other municipality	2,195
Übersaxen	Other municipality	629
Vandans	Other municipality	2,636
Viktorsberg	Other municipality	411
Warth	Other municipality	170
Weiler	Other municipality	2,075
Wolfurt	Market town	8,446
Zwischenwasser	Other municipality	3,203

== See also ==
- Geography of Austria
