= Dorfstetten =

- Municipality
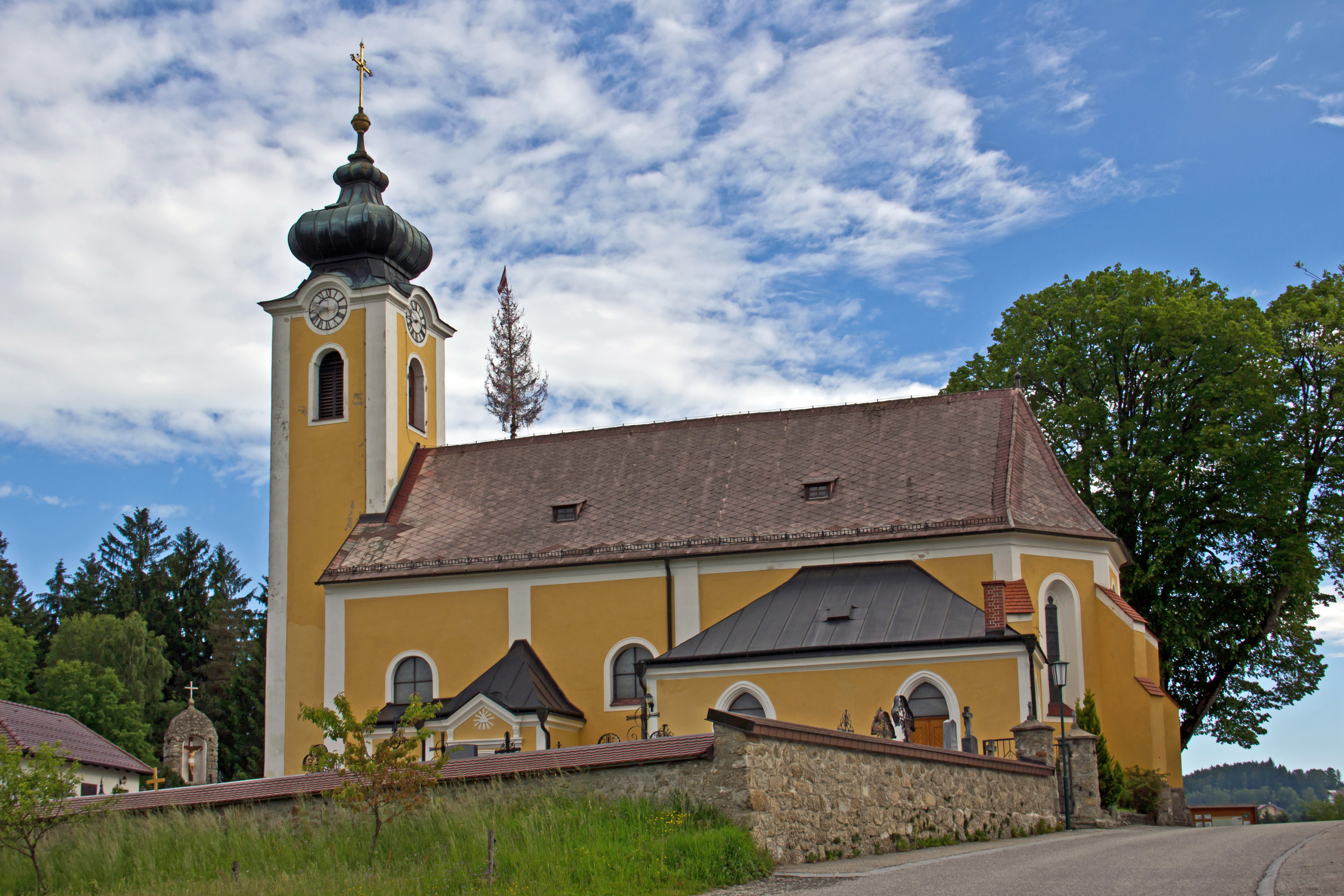
- Dorfstetten parish church

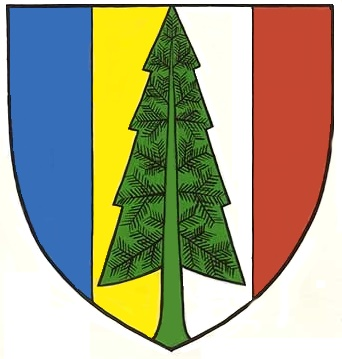
- Coat of arms

- Location within Austria
- Coordinates: 48°20′N 14°59′E
- Country: Austria
- State: Lower Austria
- District: Melk

Government
  - Mayor: Alois Fuchs

Area
  - Total: 33.12 km^{2} (12.79 sq mi)
- Elevation: 740 m (2,430 ft)

Population (2018-01-01)
  - Total: 584
  - Density: 17.6/km^{2} (45.7/sq mi)
- Time zone: UTC+1 (CET)
  - Summer (DST): UTC+2 (CEST)
- Postal code: 4392
- Area code: 07260
- Website: www.dorfstetten.at

Dorfstetten is a town in the district of Melk in the Austrian state of Lower Austria.

== Population ==
Historical population
Year	Pop.	±%
1971	696	—
1981	654	−6.0%
1991	631	−3.5%
2001	632	+0.2%
