= Gerersdorf =

- Municipality
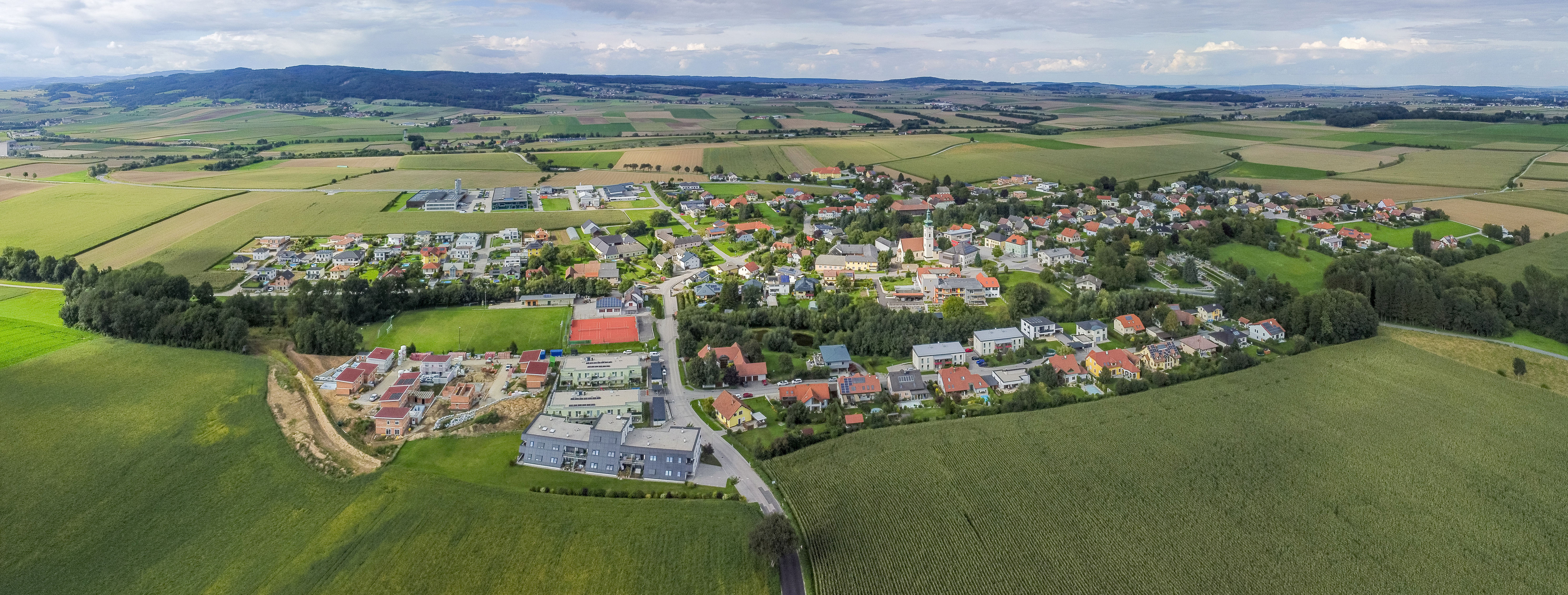
- View of Gerersdorf

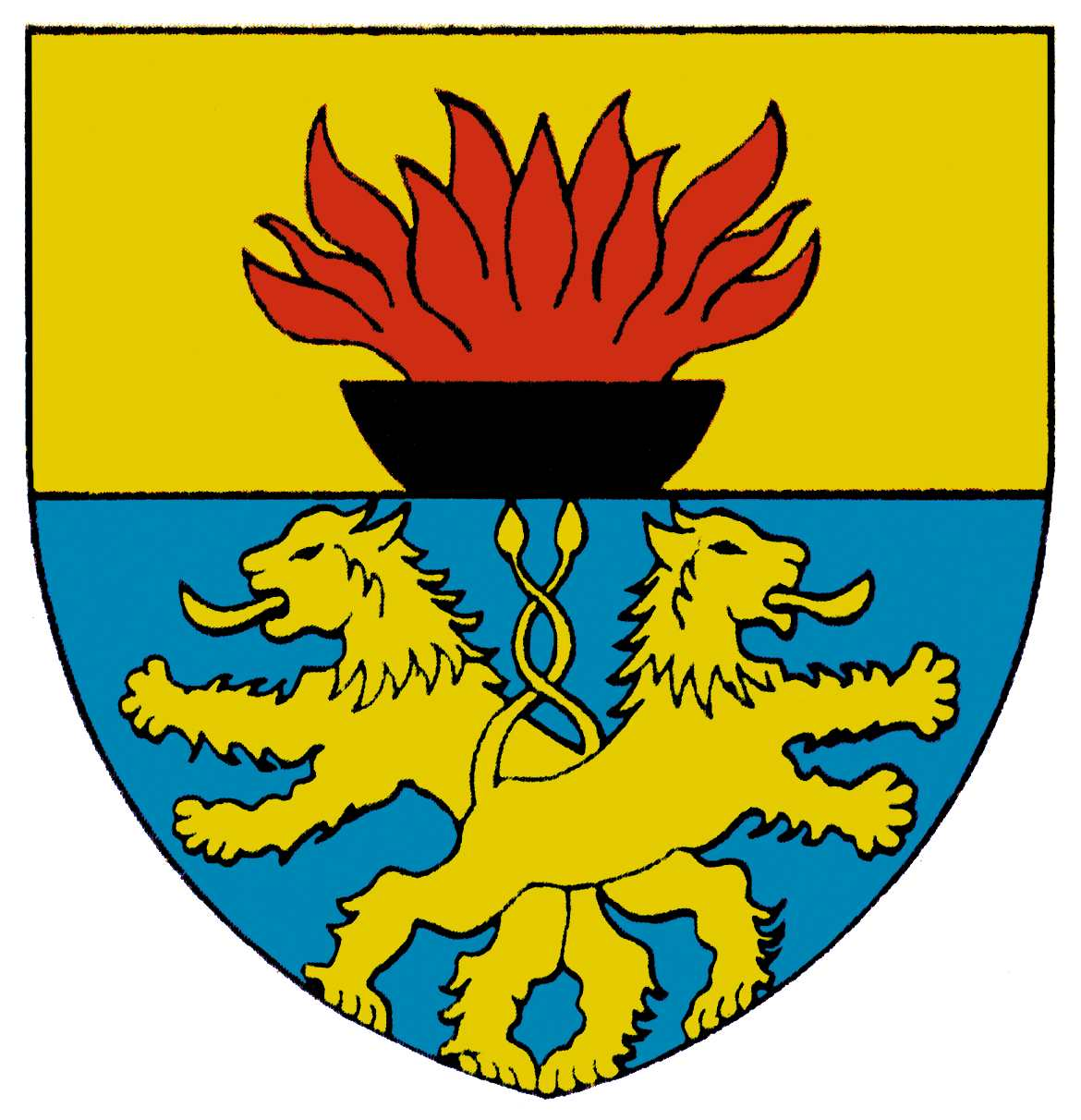
- Coat of arms

- Location within Austria
- Coordinates: 48°12′N 15°33′E
- Country: Austria
- State: Lower Austria
- District: Sankt Pölten-Land

Government
  - Mayor: Herbert Wandl

Area
  - Total: 13.66 km^{2} (5.27 sq mi)
- Elevation: 289 m (948 ft)

Population (2018-01-01)
  - Total: 974
  - Density: 71.3/km^{2} (185/sq mi)
- Time zone: UTC+1 (CET)
  - Summer (DST): UTC+2 (CEST)
- Postal code: 3385
- Area code: +43 2749
- Website: www.gerersdorf.at

Gerersdorf is a town in the district of Sankt Pölten-Land in the Austrian state of Lower Austria.

== Population ==
Historical population
| Year | Pop. | ±% |
|---|---|---|
| 1971 | 722 | — |
| 1981 | 815 | +12.9% |
| 1991 | 813 | −0.2% |
| 2001 | 884 | +8.7% |
| 2014 | 909 | +2.8% |
