= Brand-Laaben =

- Municipality
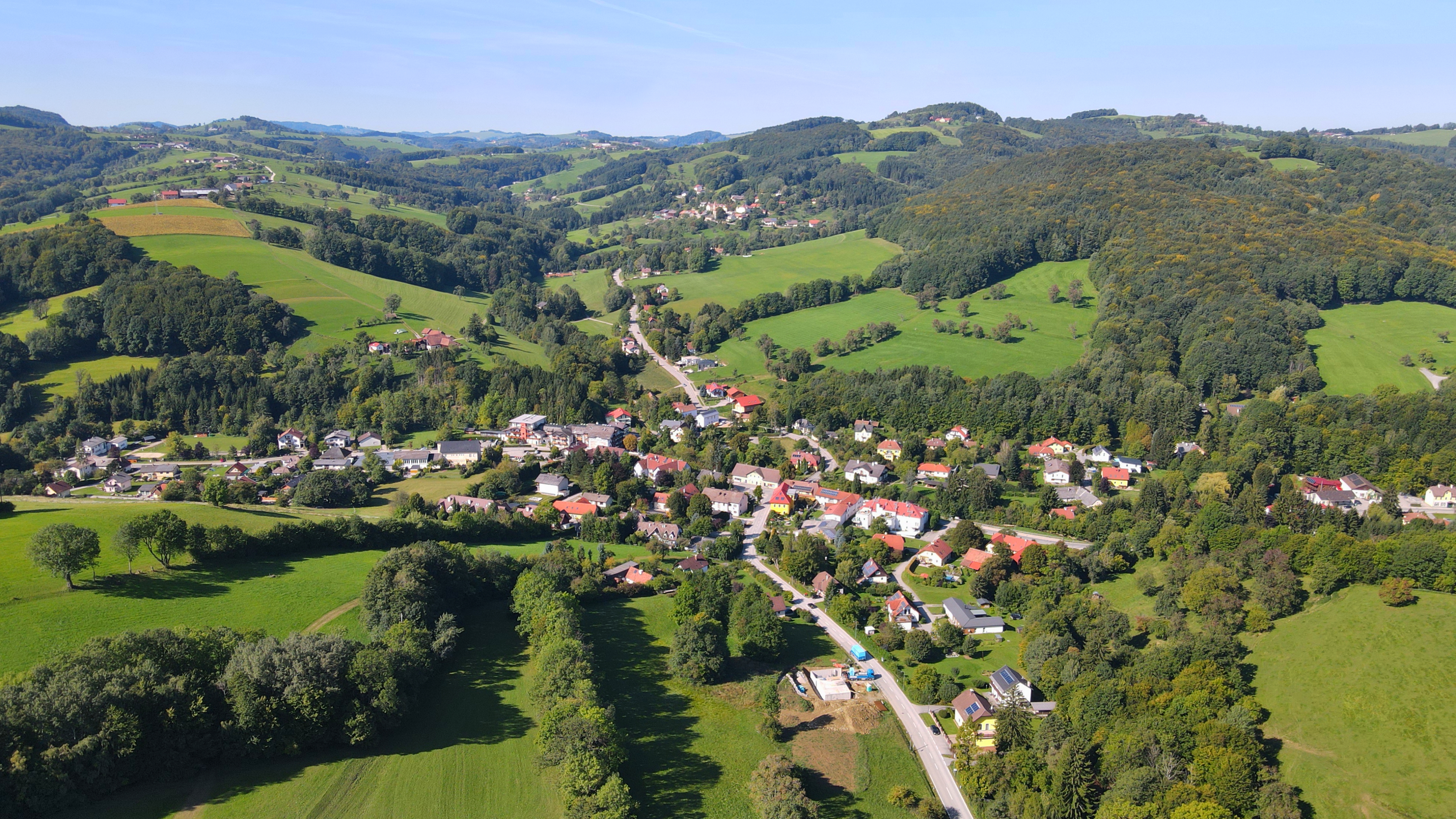

- Coat of arms

- Location within Austria
- Coordinates: 48°8′N 15°53′E
- Country: Austria
- State: Lower Austria
- District: Sankt Pölten-Land

Government
  - Mayor: Helmut Lintner (ÖVP)

Area
  - Total: 34.58 km^{2} (13.35 sq mi)
- Elevation: 347 m (1,138 ft)

Population (2018-01-01)
  - Total: 1,232
  - Density: 35.63/km^{2} (92.27/sq mi)
- Time zone: UTC+1 (CET)
  - Summer (DST): UTC+2 (CEST)
- Postal code: 3053
- Area code: 02774
- Website: http://www.brand-laaben.at

Brand-Laaben is a town in the district of Sankt Pölten-Land in the Austrian state of Lower Austria.

== Population ==
Historical population
Year	Pop.	±%
1971	1,119	—
1981	1,047	−6.4%
1991	1,123	+7.3%
2001	1,155	+2.8%
2015	1,196	+3.5%
