= Raxendorf =

- Municipality
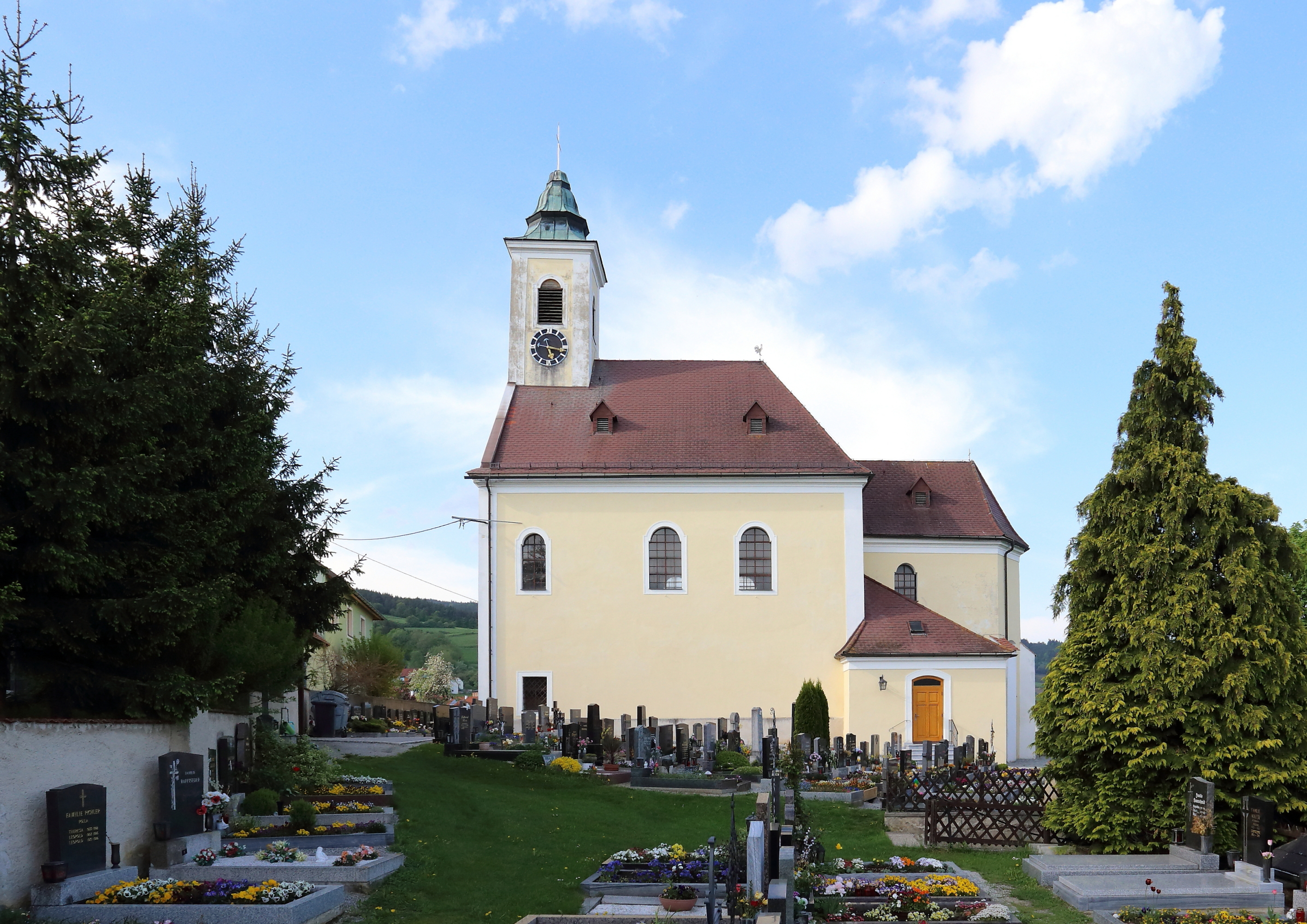
- Raxendorf parish church

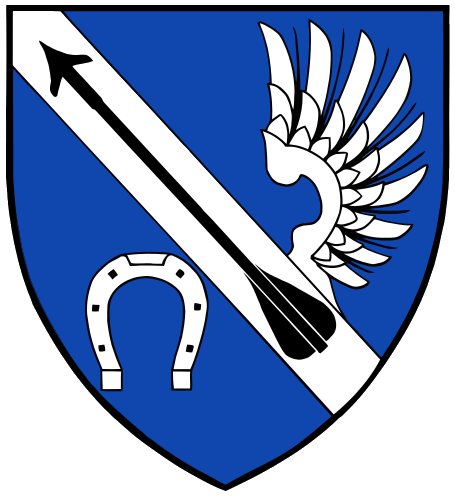
- Coat of arms

- Location within Austria
- Coordinates: 48°20′N 15°16′E
- Country: Austria
- State: Lower Austria
- District: Melk

Government
  - Mayor: Johann Stadler

Area
  - Total: 36.24 km^{2} (13.99 sq mi)
- Elevation: 506 m (1,660 ft)

Population (2018-01-01)
  - Total: 1,050
  - Density: 29.0/km^{2} (75.0/sq mi)
- Time zone: UTC+1 (CET)
  - Summer (DST): UTC+2 (CEST)
- Postal code: 3654
- Area code: 02758
- Website: www.raxendorf.at

Raxendorf is a town in the district of Melk in the Austrian state of Lower Austria.

== Population ==
Historical population
Year	Pop.	±%
1971	1,184	—
1981	1,134	−4.2%
1991	1,132	−0.2%
2001	1,101	−2.7%
