= Bischofstetten =

- Municipality
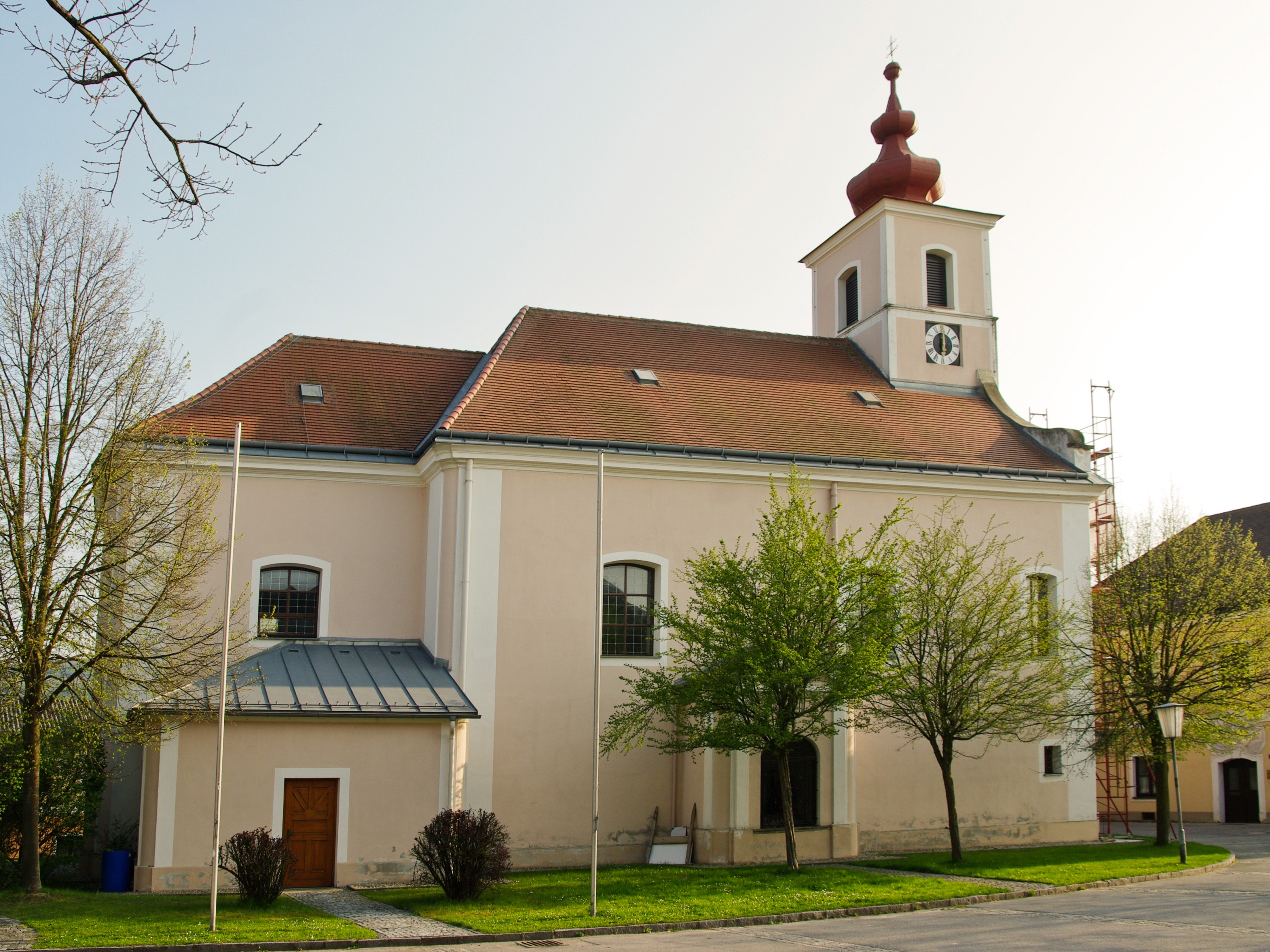
- Bischofstetten parish church

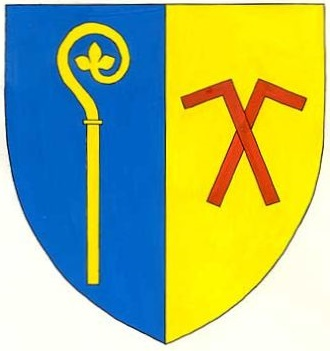
- Coat of arms

- Location within Austria
- Coordinates: 48°7′N 15°28′E
- Country: Austria
- State: Lower Austria
- District: Melk

Government
  - Mayor: Werner Nolz

Area
  - Total: 19 km^{2} (7.3 sq mi)
- Elevation: 274 m (899 ft)

Population (2018-01-01)
  - Total: 1,176
  - Density: 62/km^{2} (160/sq mi)
- Time zone: UTC+1 (CET)
  - Summer (DST): UTC+2 (CEST)
- Postal code: 3232
- Area code: 02748
- Website: www.bischofstetten.at

Bischofstetten is a town in the district of Melk in the Austrian state of Lower Austria.

== Population ==
Historical population
Year	Pop.	±%
1971	1,071	—
1981	1,086	+1.4%
1991	1,144	+5.3%
2001	1,186	+3.7%
2011	1,168	−1.5%
2021	1,236	+5.8%
