= St. Margarethen an der Sierning =

- Municipality
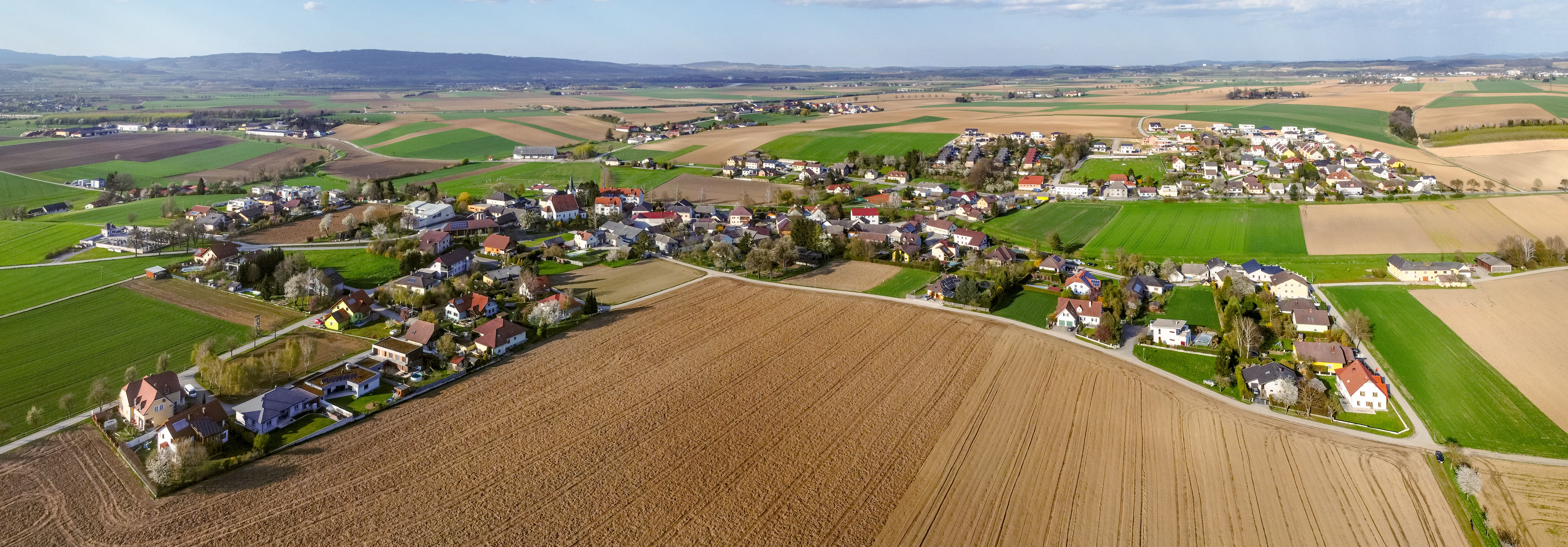

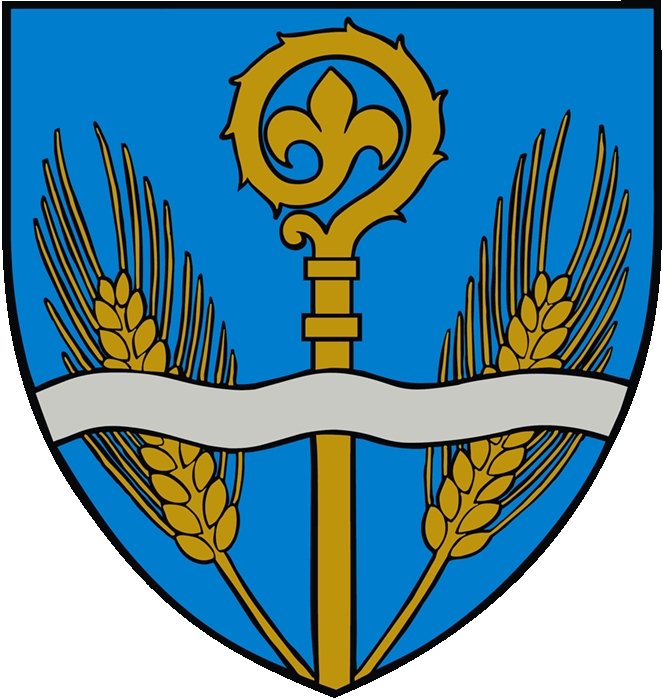
- Coat of arms

- Location within Austria
- Coordinates: 48°09′32″N 15°29′31″E
- Country: Austria
- State: Lower Austria
- District: Sankt Pölten-Land

Government
  - Mayor: Franz Trischler (ÖVP)

Area
  - Total: 14.58 km^{2} (5.63 sq mi)
- Elevation: 261 m (856 ft)

Population (2018-01-01)
  - Total: 1,013
  - Density: 69.48/km^{2} (179.9/sq mi)
- Time zone: UTC+1 (CET)
  - Summer (DST): UTC+2 (CEST)
- Postal code: 3231
- Area code: 02747
- Vehicle registration: PL
- Website: www.sankt-margarethen.at

Sankt Margarethen an der Sierning is a municipality in the district of Sankt Pölten-Land in Lower Austria, in northeast Austria.

== Population ==
Historical population
Year	Pop.	±%
1971	899	—
1981	941	+4.7%
1991	1,006	+6.9%
2001	1,025	+1.9%
