= Heiligenbrunn =

- Municipality
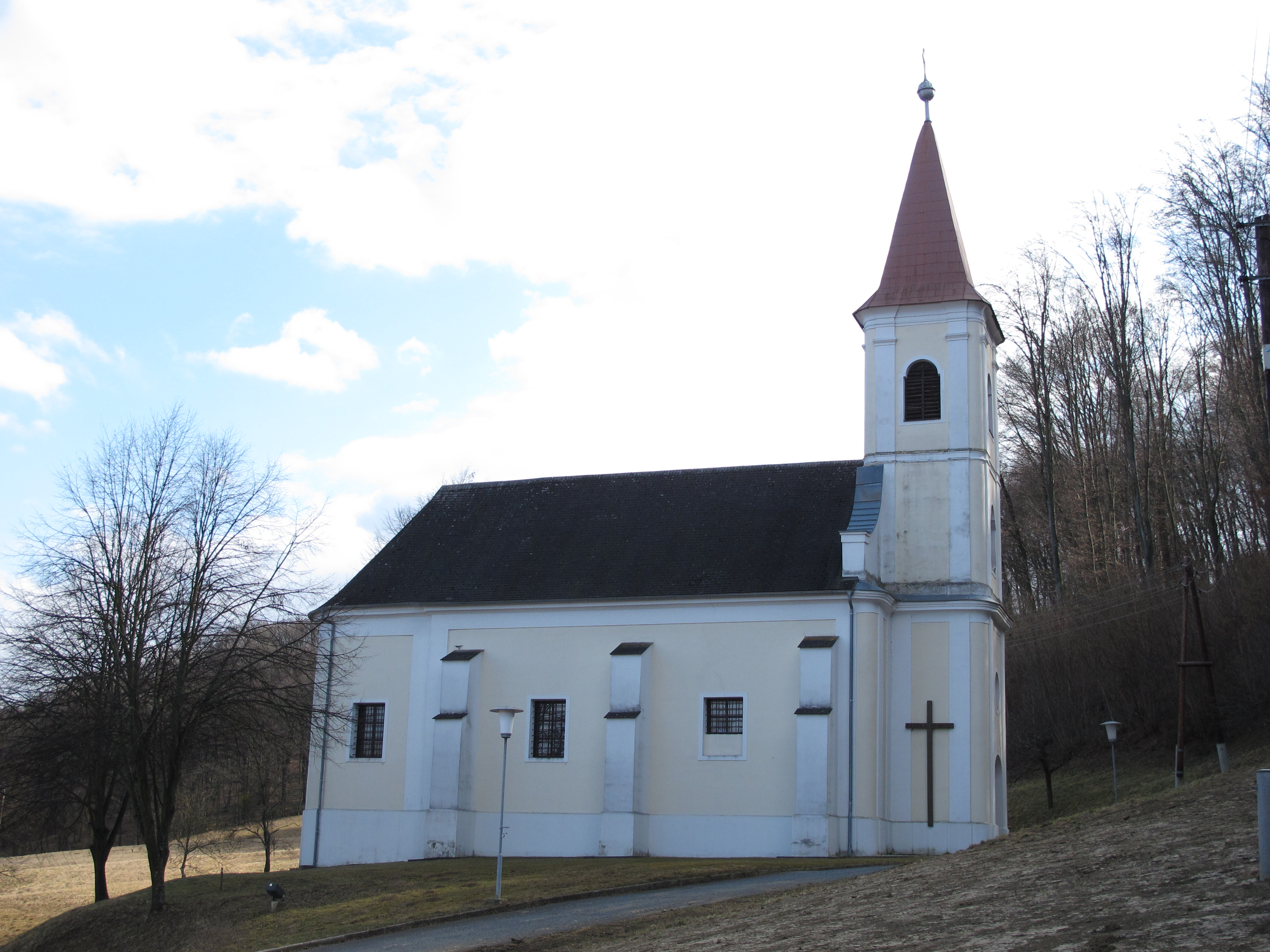
- Heiligenbrunn parish church

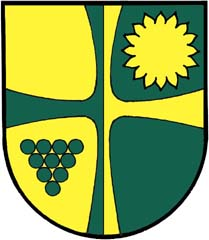
- Coat of arms

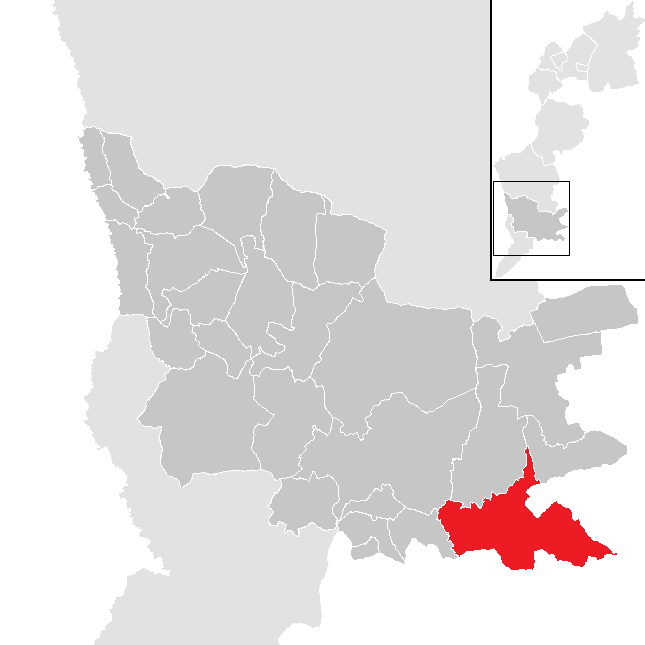
- Location within Güssing district

- Location within Austria
- Coordinates: 47°2′N 16°25′E
- Country: Austria
- State: Burgenland
- District: Güssing

Government
  - Mayor: Johann Trinkl (ÖVP)

Area
  - Total: 33.51 km^{2} (12.94 sq mi)
- Elevation: 223 m (732 ft)

Population (2018-01-01)
  - Total: 759
  - Density: 22.6/km^{2} (58.7/sq mi)
- Time zone: UTC+1 (CET)
  - Summer (DST): UTC+2 (CEST)
- Postal code: 7522

Heiligenbrunn (German pronunciation: [ˌhaɪ̯lɪɡn̩ˈbʁʊn]) is a town in the district of Güssing in the Austrian state of Burgenland. It is known for being a centre of the Uhudler wine and for its historic Kellerviertel, or wine cellar quarter, where the wine was made.

== Etymology ==
The name Heiligenbrunn stems from the German words Heilig (holy) and Brunnen (fountain or well), which refers to a nearby spring, the Ulrichsquelle, which has been an important pilgrimage destination in the region for centuries.

== History ==
As with the rest of Austria, the area was annexed by Nazi Germany during the Anschluss and was incorporated into the district of Fürstenfeld. On the 1st April 1945, the Red Army reached the area after arriving from Hungary to the east and forced the Wehrmacht to retreat towards Güssing on April 12.

In 1947 and 1954 the parish church was rebuilt after severe war damage and damage from a lightning strike.

As an area lying directly on the former Iron Curtain, the town was a target destination for Hungarian migrants attempting to cross the border into Austria. Because of this, in May 1957, the border area with Hungary was fortified with barbed wire, wooden watchtowers and land mines. In November 1960, a group of three Hungarian boys attempted to flee to Hagensdorf im Burgenland when two of them were injured by land mines, one seriously. Two of the boys escaped into Austria, yet the third disappeared and was according to an inquiry assumed to have been taken back to Hungary by Hungarian soldiers. In August 1962, a Hungarian citizen was injured by a land mine in the Luising area, before being admitted to hospital in Güssing.

== Geography ==
The municipality of Heiligenbrunn includes the villages of Deutsch Bieling, Hagensdorf im Burgenland, Luising and Reinersdorf, as well as Heiligenbrunn itself. The municipality is on the Hungarian border and is bounded by Vas County to the south and east, Moschendorf and Strem to the north, and Großmürbisch to the west.

Reinersdorf is the southernmost village of Burgenland with a Croatian minority. Previously, the municipality also contained the village of Ungarisch Bieling, but this was abandoned after 1946 due to tensions between Germany and Hungary and the last resident left the village in 1958.

The municipality contains a Naturschutzgebiet, of two meadows near Hagensdorf im Burgenland and Luising, known as the Schachblumenwiese, or fritillary meadows. These meadows contain the largest population of snakes-head fritillary in Austria.

== Population ==
Historical population
Year	Pop.	±%
1869	1,584	—
1880	1,582	−0.1%
1890	1,716	+8.5%
1900	1,703	−0.8%
1910	1,633	−4.1%
1923	1,591	−2.6%
1934	1,562	−1.8%
1939	1,559	−0.2%
1951	1,531	−1.8%
1961	1,398	−8.7%
1971	1,226	−12.3%
1981	1,133	−7.6%
1991	1,087	−4.1%
2001	989	−9.0%
2011	831	−16.0%
2021	744	−10.5%

== Notable people ==
Michael Somogyi, American biochemist known for his work on diabetes.
