= Sankt Michael =

Sankt Michael may refer to:

- places in Austria:
  - Sankt Michael im Burgenland, a municipality in Burgenland
  - Sankt Michael im Lungau, a municipality in Salzburg
  - Sankt Michael in Obersteiermark, a municipality in Styria
- churches in Germany
  - St. Michael's Church, Hildesheim, in Hildesheim
  - St. Michael, Fulda, in Fulda
  - St Michael in Berg am Laim (München), in Munich
  - St. Michael's Church, Munich, in Munich
