= Tschanigraben =

- Municipality
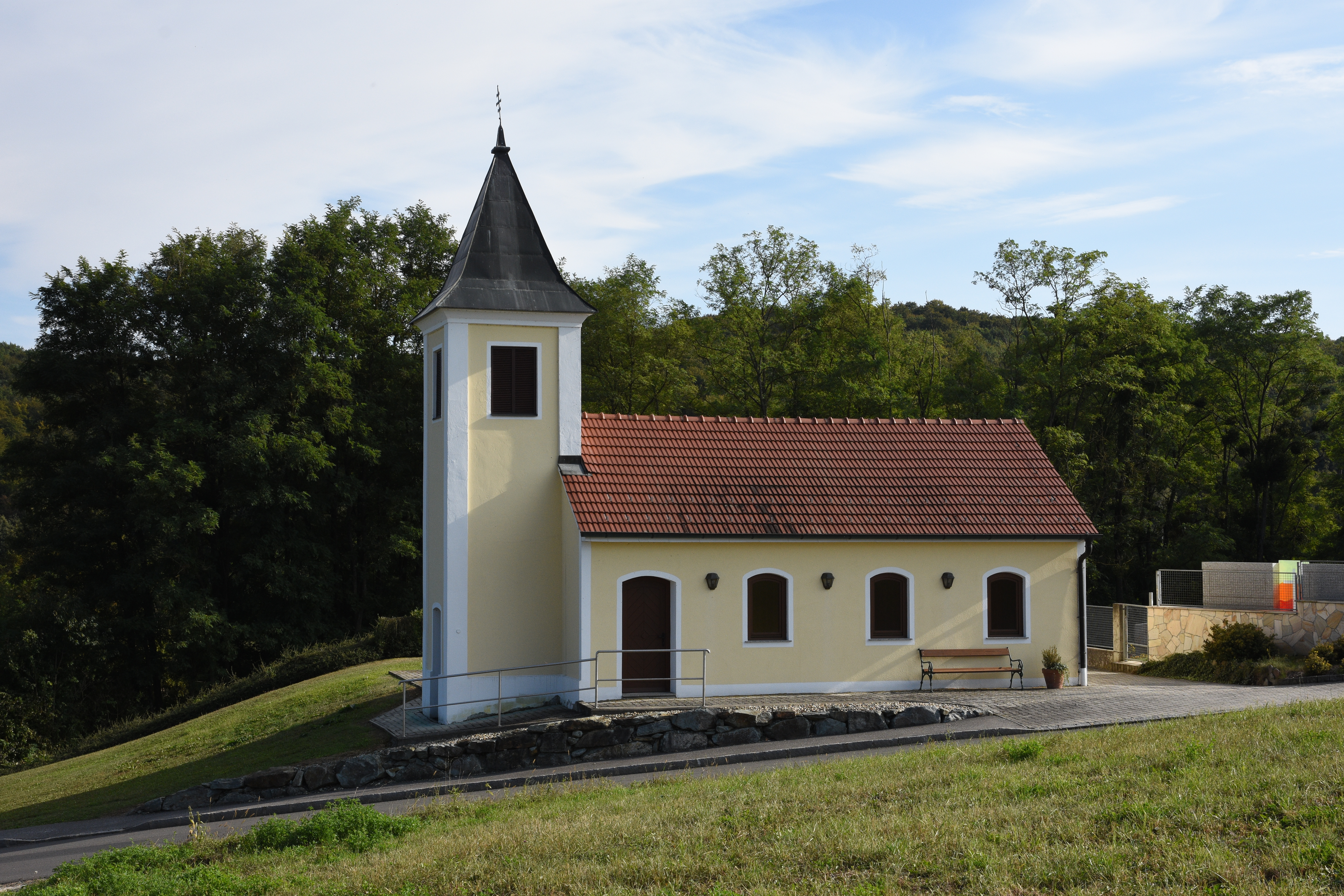
- Tschanigraben chapel

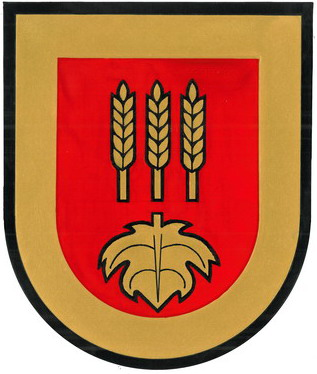
- Coat of arms

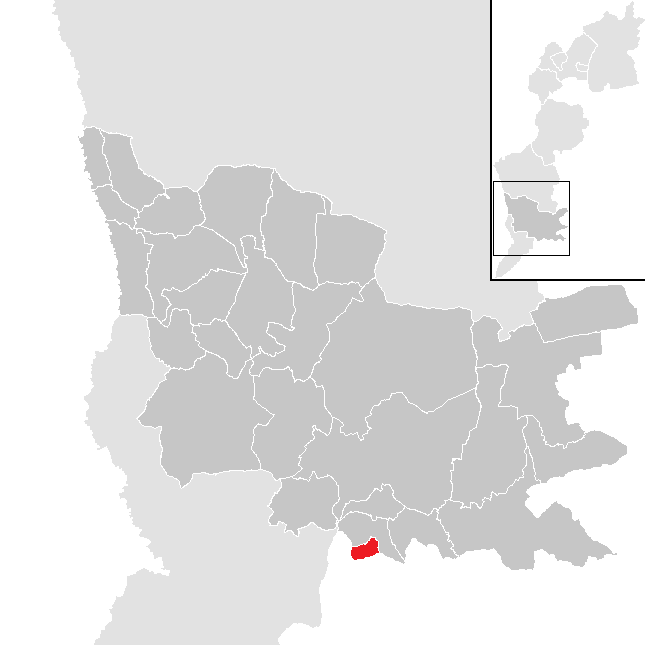
- Location within Güssing district

- Location within Austria
- Coordinates: 47°0′N 16°18′E
- Country: Austria
- State: Burgenland
- District: Güssing

Government
  - Mayor: Ernst Simitz (SPÖ)

Area
  - Total: 1.71 km^{2} (0.66 sq mi)

Population (2018-01-01)
  - Total: 62
  - Density: 36/km^{2} (94/sq mi)
- Time zone: UTC+1 (CET)
  - Summer (DST): UTC+2 (CEST)
- Postal code: 7540

Tschanigraben (Hungarian: Sándorhegy) is a municipality in the district of Güssing in the Austrian state of Burgenland. With only 62 inhabitants, it is the second-smallest municipality in Burgenland, only after Rauhriegel. Formerly a part of Neustift bei Güssing, Tschanigraben was elevated to municipality status in 1991.

== Geography ==
=== Populated places ===
The municipality of Tschanigraben consists of the following populated place (with population in brackets as of 1 January 2022): being the village of Tschanigraben (68).

== Population ==
Historical population
Year	Pop.	±%
1869	192	—
1880	202	+5.2%
1890	255	+26.2%
1900	202	−20.8%
1910	190	−5.9%
1923	189	−0.5%
1934	184	−2.6%
1939	152	−17.4%
1951	148	−2.6%
1961	105	−29.1%
1971	86	−18.1%
1981	77	−10.5%
1991	78	+1.3%
2001	67	−14.1%
2011	68	+1.5%
