= Burgauberg-Neudauberg =

- Municipality
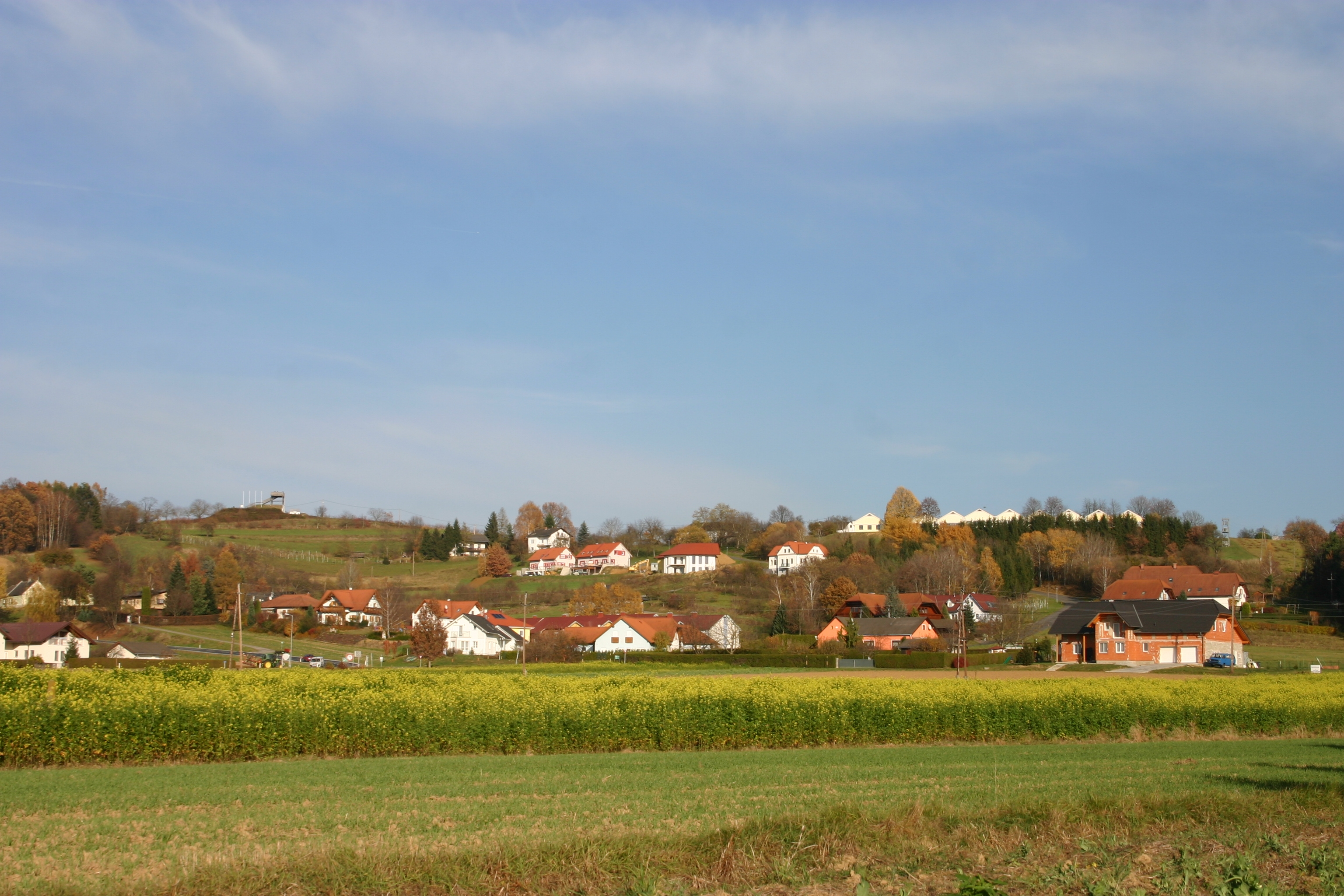
- View of Burgauberg-Neudauberg

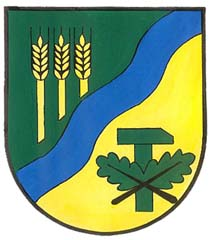
- Coat of arms

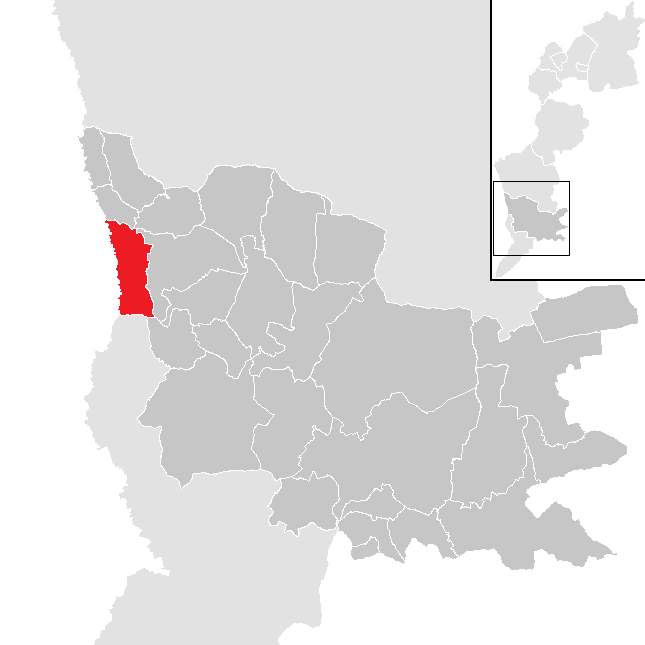
- Location within Güssing district

- Location within Austria
- Coordinates: 47°9′N 16°8′E
- Country: Austria
- State: Burgenland
- District: Güssing

Government
  - Mayor: Wolfgang Eder (ÖVP)

Area
  - Total: 10.91 km^{2} (4.21 sq mi)
- Elevation: 350 m (1,150 ft)

Population (2018-01-01)
  - Total: 1,360
  - Density: 125/km^{2} (323/sq mi)
- Time zone: UTC+1 (CET)
  - Summer (DST): UTC+2 (CEST)
- Postal code: 8291

Burgauberg-Neudauberg is a town in the district of Güssing in the Austrian state of Burgenland.

== Population ==
Historical population
Year	Pop.	±%
1869	1,087	—
1880	1,205	+10.9%
1890	1,327	+10.1%
1900	1,367	+3.0%
1910	1,389	+1.6%
1923	1,423	+2.4%
1934	1,486	+4.4%
1939	1,418	−4.6%
1951	1,355	−4.4%
1961	1,224	−9.7%
1971	1,253	+2.4%
1981	1,266	+1.0%
1991	1,253	−1.0%
2001	1,319	+5.3%
2011	1,351	+2.4%
2021	1,334	−1.3%
