= Rauchwart =

- Municipality
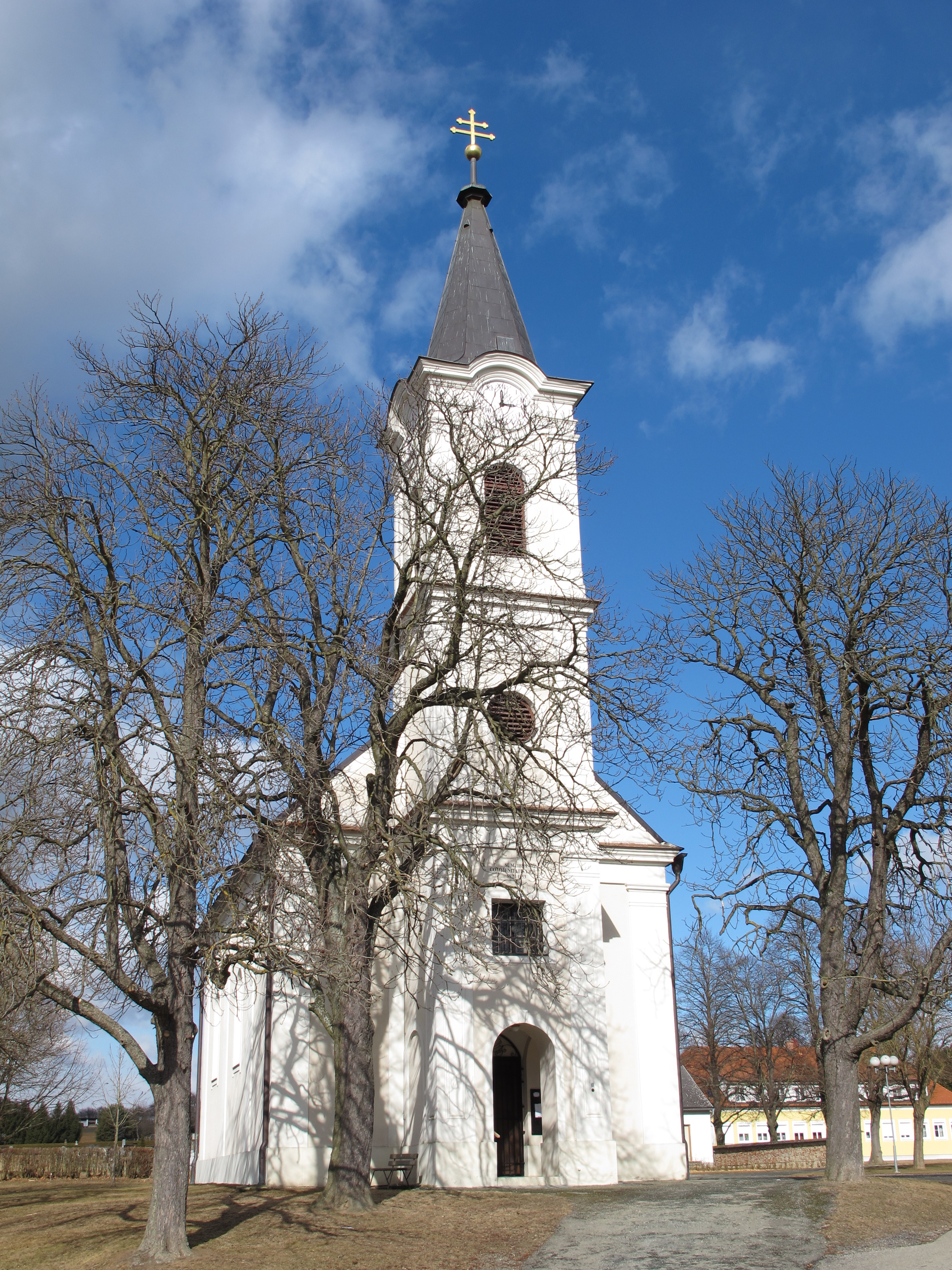
- Catholic church in Rauchwart

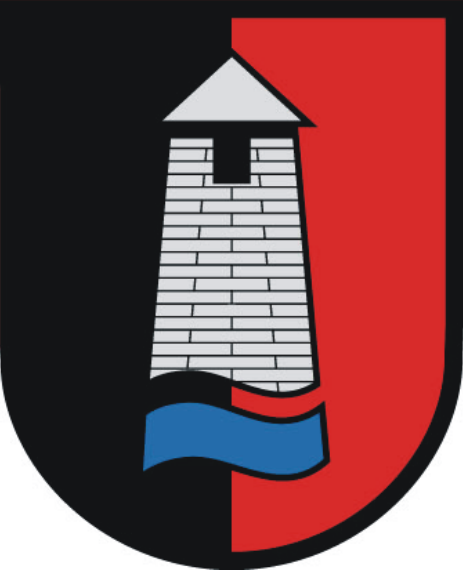
- Coat of arms

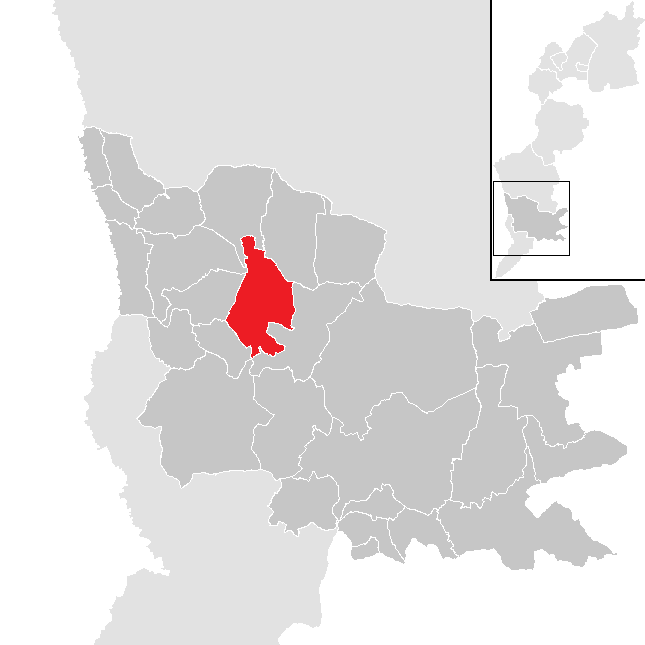
- Location within Güssing district

- Location within Austria
- Coordinates: 47°8′N 16°14′E
- Country: Austria
- State: Burgenland
- District: Güssing

Government
  - Mayor: Michaela Raber (SPÖ)

Area
  - Total: 17.51 km^{2} (6.76 sq mi)

Population (2018-01-01)
  - Total: 446
  - Density: 25.5/km^{2} (66.0/sq mi)
- Time zone: UTC+1 (CET)
  - Summer (DST): UTC+2 (CEST)
- Postal code: 7535
- Website: www.rauchwart.at (in German)

Rauchwart (German pronunciation: [ʁaʊxˈvaʁt]; Hungarian: Rábort) is a village in the district of Güssing in the Austrian state of Burgenland.

== Geography ==
=== Climate ===
Climate data for Kukmirn, Austria
Month	Jan	Feb	Mar	Apr	May	Jun	Jul	Aug	Sep	Oct	Nov	Dec	Year
Mean daily maximum °F (°C)	37 (3)	44 (7)	51 (11)	61 (16)	70 (21)	76 (24)	80 (27)	78 (26)	69 (21)	60 (16)	47 (8)	37 (3)	59.166 (15.09)
Mean daily minimum °F (°C)	23 (−5)	25 (−4)	31 (−1)	38 (3)	47 (8)	53 (12)	56 (13)	55 (13)	48 (9)	40 (4)	34 (1)	26 (−3)	39.666 (4.26)
Source: <World Weather Online= >"Kukmirn Climate Weather Averages". Kukmirn Monthly Climate Average, Austria. World Weather Online. 2016.

== Population ==
Historical population
Year	Pop.	±%
1869	786	—
1880	882	+12.2%
1890	886	+0.5%
1900	976	+10.2%
1910	1,031	+5.6%
1923	886	−14.1%
1934	836	−5.6%
1939	809	−3.2%
1951	672	−16.9%
1961	585	−12.9%
1971	562	−3.9%
1981	520	−7.5%
1991	524	+0.8%
2001	464	−11.5%
2011	450	−3.0%
2021	460	+2.2%
