= Ollersdorf im Burgenland =

- Municipality
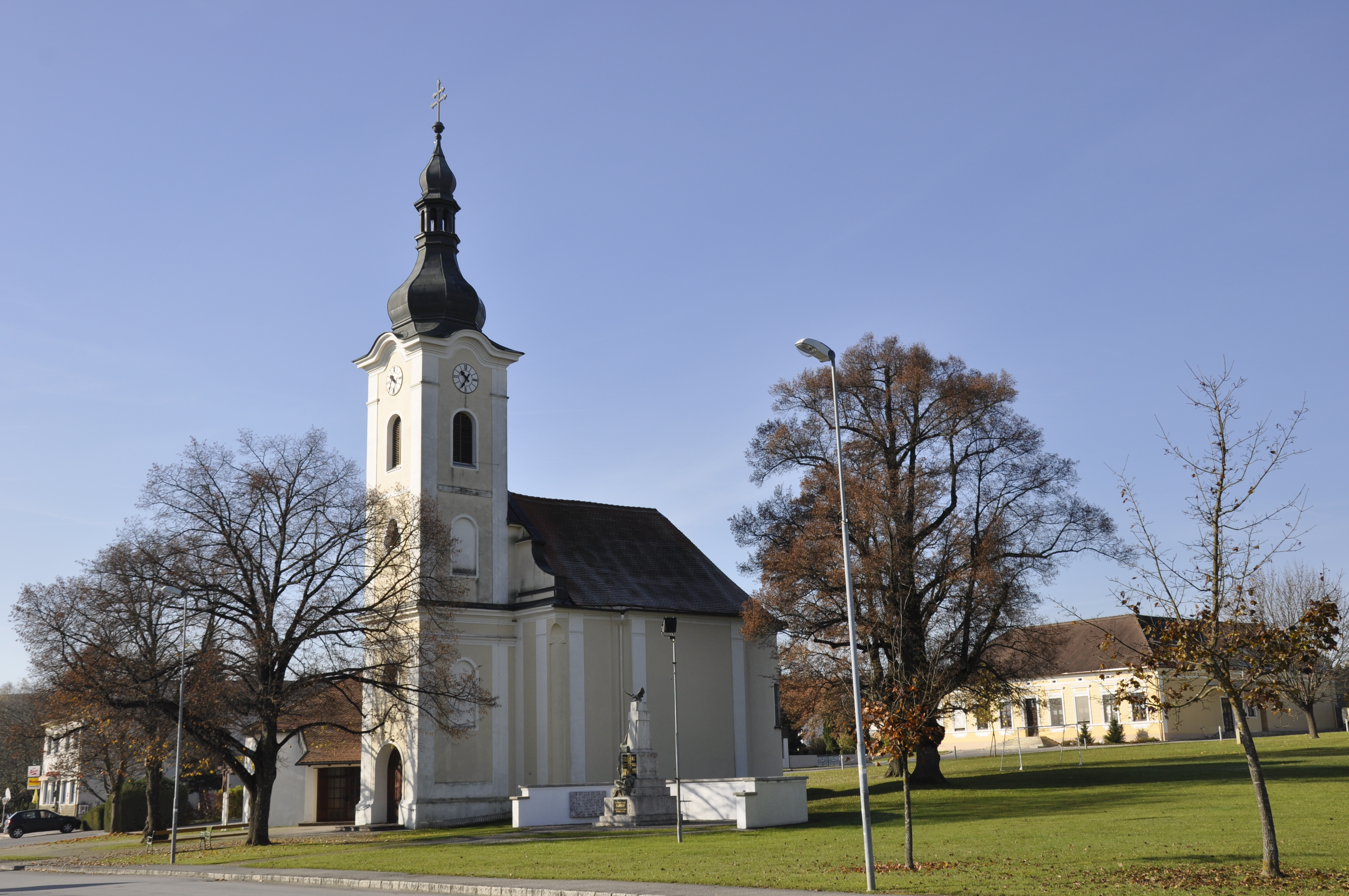
- Church of the Assumption of the Virgin Mary

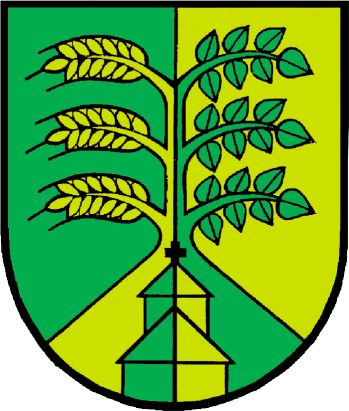
- Coat of arms

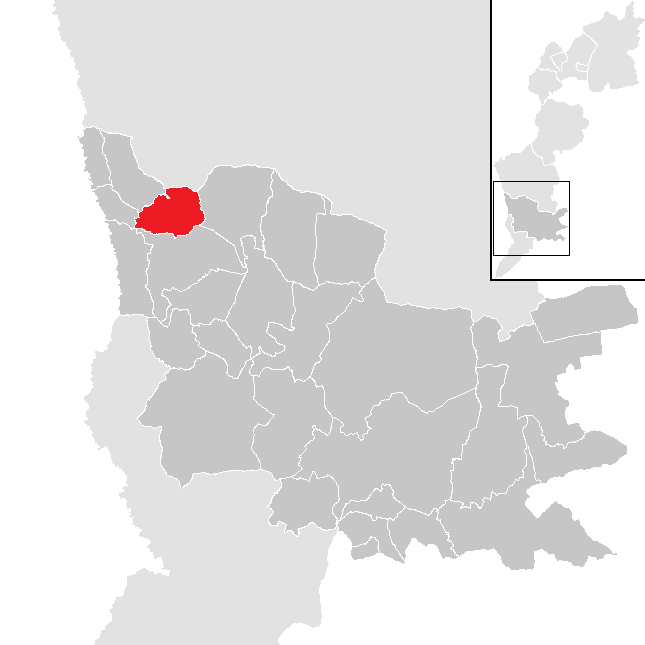
- Location within Güssing district

- Location within Burgenland Location within Austria
- Coordinates: 47°10′N 16°10′E
- Country: Austria
- State: Burgenland
- District: Güssing

Government
  - Mayor: Bernd Strobl (ÖVP)

Area
  - Total: 8.86 km^{2} (3.42 sq mi)

Population (2018-01-01)
  - Total: 933
  - Density: 105/km^{2} (273/sq mi)
- Time zone: UTC+1 (CET)
  - Summer (DST): UTC+2 (CEST)
- Postal code: 7533
- Website: https://www.ollersdorf-burgenland.at/

Ollersdorf im Burgenland (Croatian: Fraterovo Selo, Hungarian: Barátfalva) is a town in the district of Güssing in the Austrian state of Burgenland.

== Population ==
Historical population
Year	Pop.	±%
1869	772	—
1880	858	+11.1%
1890	938	+9.3%
1900	986	+5.1%
1910	968	−1.8%
1923	934	−3.5%
1934	939	+0.5%
1939	924	−1.6%
1951	939	+1.6%
1961	915	−2.6%
1971	1,006	+9.9%
1981	1,015	+0.9%
1991	957	−5.7%
2001	983	+2.7%
2011	975	−0.8%
2021	921	−5.5%
