= Kukmirn =

- Municipality
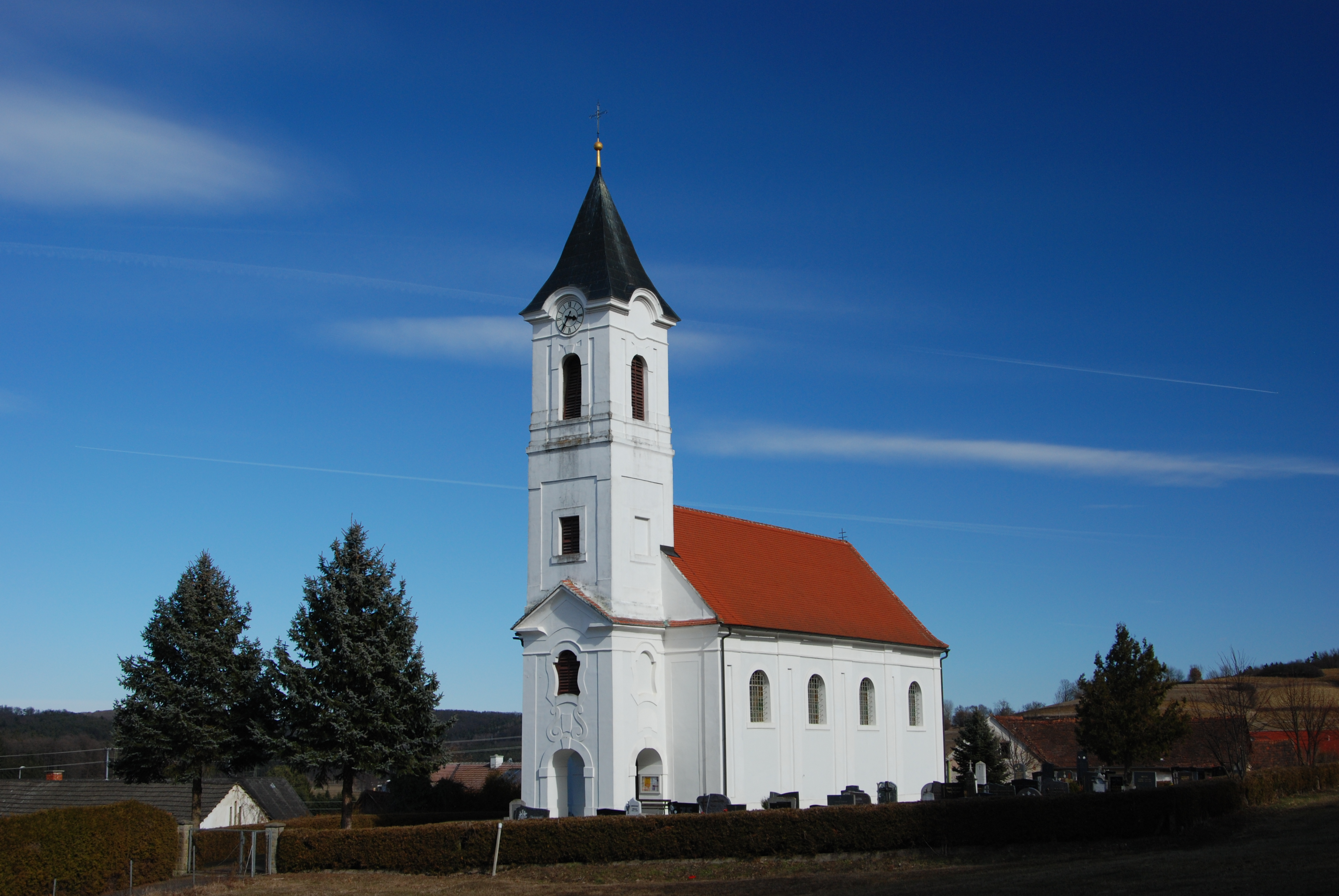
- Kukmirn parish church

- Coat of arms

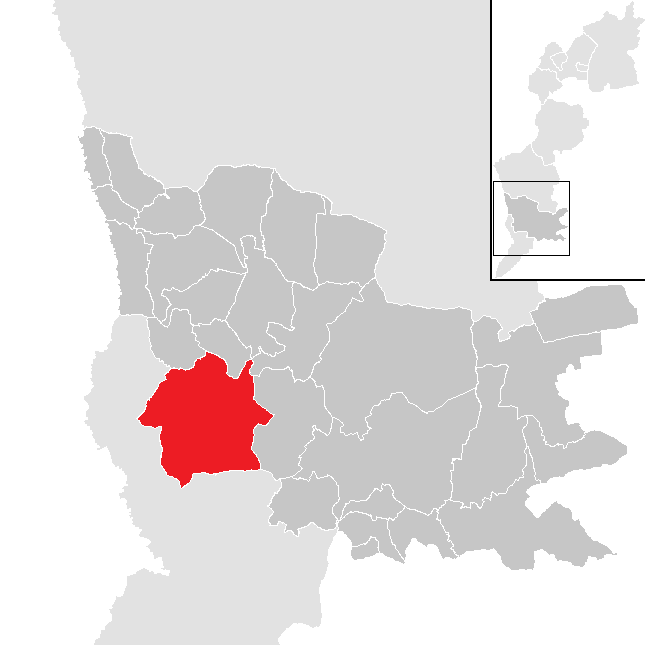
- Location within Güssing district

- Location within Austria
- Coordinates: 47°4′N 16°12′E
- Country: Austria
- State: Burgenland
- District: Güssing

Government
  - Mayor: Werner Kemetter (ÖVP)

Area
  - Total: 40.5 km^{2} (15.6 sq mi)

Population (2018-01-01)
  - Total: 2,012
  - Density: 49.7/km^{2} (129/sq mi)
- Time zone: UTC+1 (CET)
  - Summer (DST): UTC+2 (CEST)
- Postal code: 7543
- Website: https://www.kukmirn.at/

Kukmirn (German pronunciation: [kʊkˈmɪʁn]; Croatian: Kukimir, Hungarian: Kukmér) is a town in the district of Güssing in the Austrian state of Burgenland.

== Geography ==
=== Climate ===
Climate data for Kukmirn, Austria
Month	Jan	Feb	Mar	Apr	May	Jun	Jul	Aug	Sep	Oct	Nov	Dec	Year
Mean daily maximum °F (°C)	37 (3)	44 (7)	51 (11)	61 (16)	70 (21)	76 (24)	80 (27)	78 (26)	69 (21)	60 (16)	47 (8)	37 (3)	59.166 (15.09)
Mean daily minimum °F (°C)	23 (−5)	25 (−4)	31 (−1)	38 (3)	47 (8)	53 (12)	56 (13)	55 (13)	48 (9)	40 (4)	34 (1)	26 (−3)	39.666 (4.26)
Source: <World Weather Online= >"Kukmirn Monthly Climate Averages". Kukmirn Monthly Climate Average, Austria. World Weather Online. 2016.

== Population ==
Historical population
Year	Pop.	±%
1869	3,244	—
1880	3,451	+6.4%
1890	3,656	+5.9%
1900	3,479	−4.8%
1910	3,270	−6.0%
1923	3,024	−7.5%
1934	2,981	−1.4%
1939	2,719	−8.8%
1951	2,463	−9.4%
1961	2,400	−2.6%
1971	2,215	−7.7%
1981	2,190	−1.1%
1991	2,080	−5.0%
2001	2,035	−2.2%
2011	1,994	−2.0%
2021	2,009	+0.8%
