= Hackerberg =

- Municipality
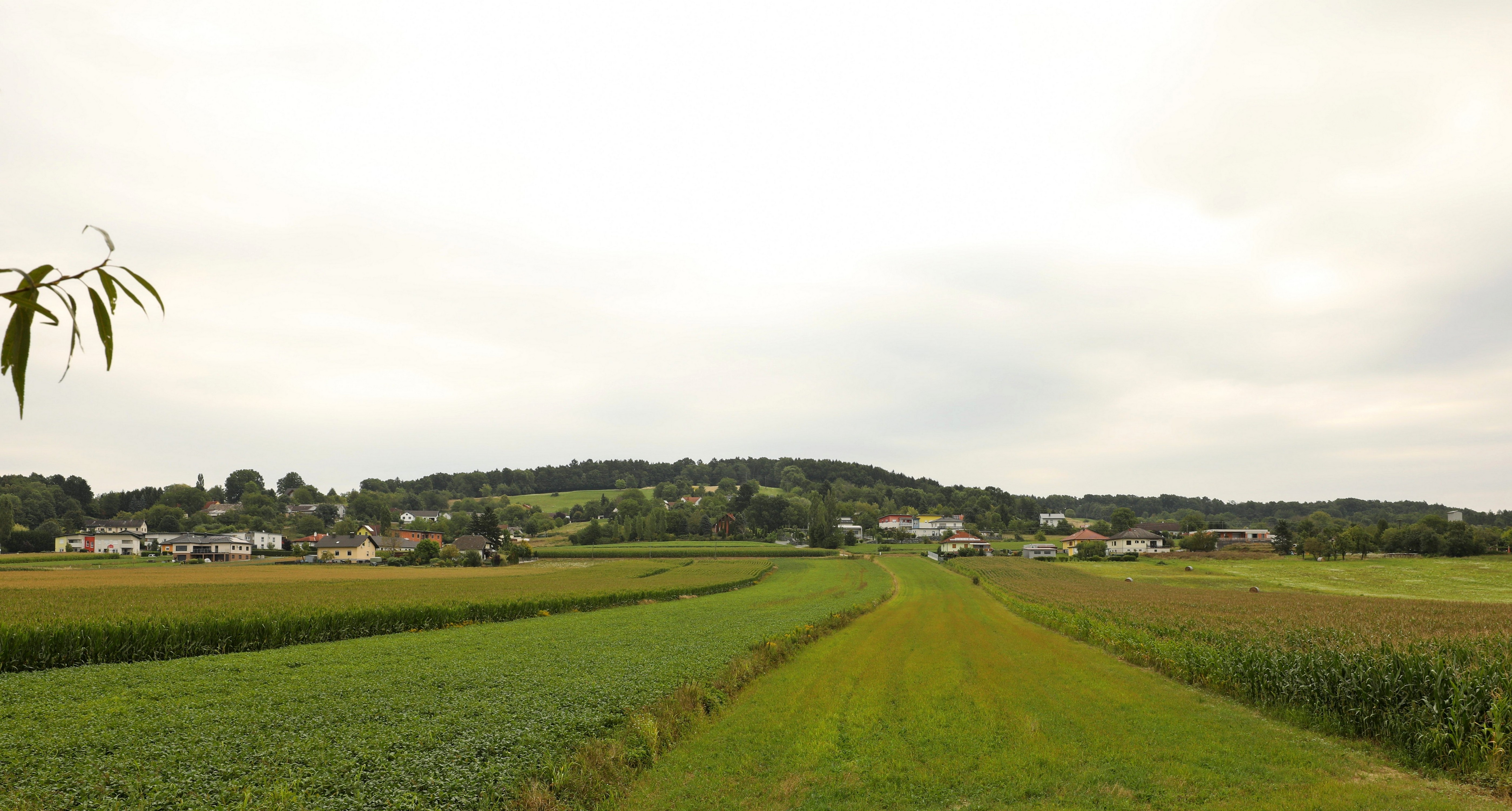
- Chapel in Hackerberg

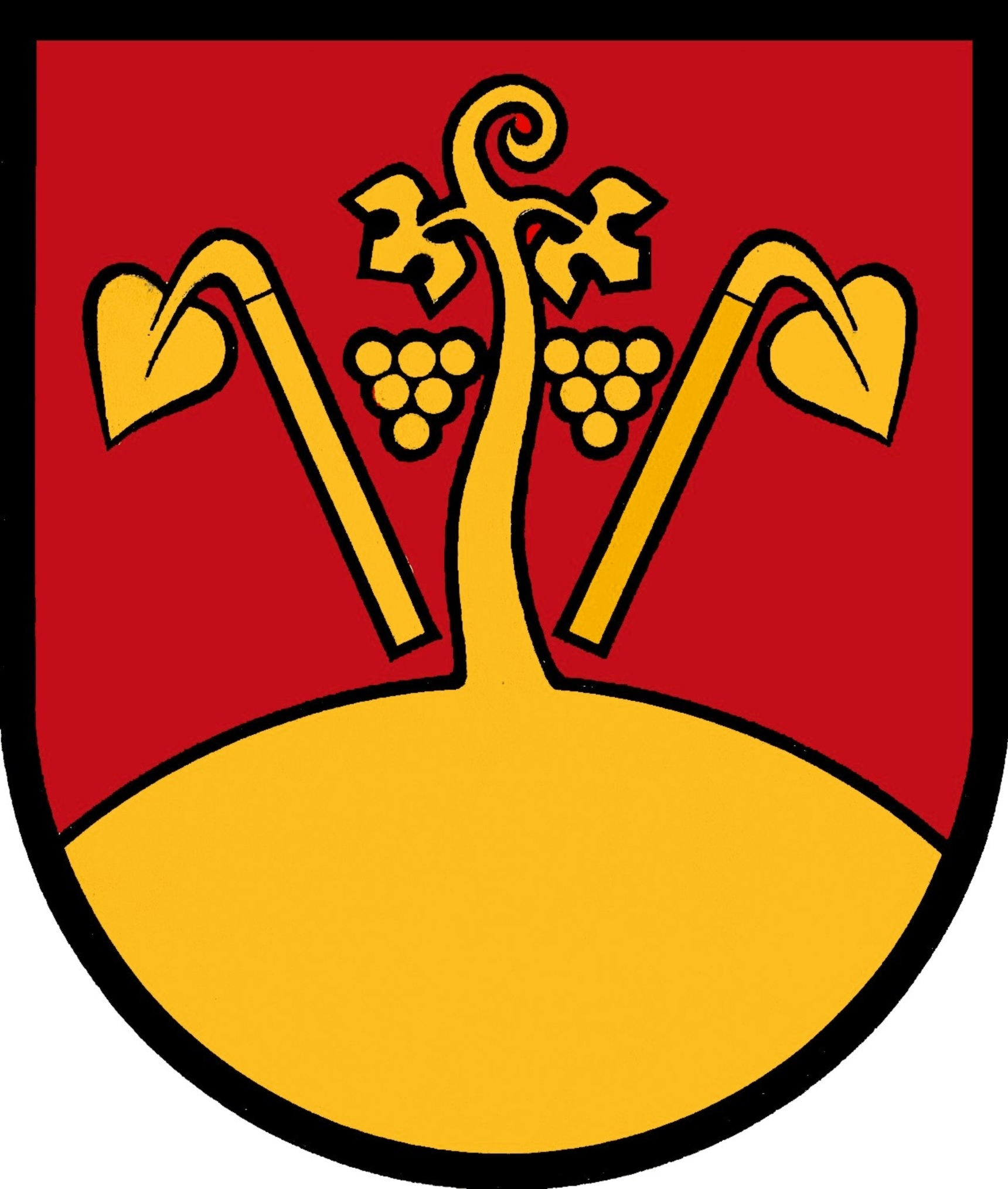
- Coat of arms

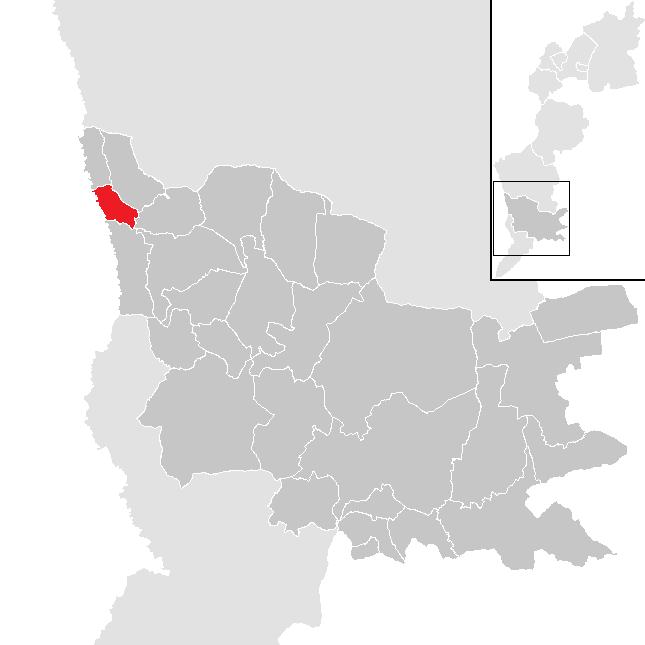
- Location within Güssing district

- Location within Austria Hackerberg (Austria)
- Coordinates: 47°11′46″N 16°6′25″E
- Country: Austria
- State: Burgenland
- District: Güssing

Government
  - Mayor: Karin Kirisits (ÖVP)

Area
  - Total: 3.87 km^{2} (1.49 sq mi)
- Elevation: 392 m (1,286 ft)

Population (2018-01-01)
  - Total: 357
  - Density: 92.2/km^{2} (239/sq mi)
- Time zone: UTC+1 (CET)
  - Summer (DST): UTC+2 (CEST)
- Postal code: 8292
- Area code: 03358, GS
- Website: www.hackerberg

Hackerberg (Croatian: Štinjački Vrh) is a town in the district of Güssing in the Austrian state of Burgenland.

== Population ==
Historical population
Year	Pop.	±%
1869	315	—
1880	355	+12.7%
1890	406	+14.4%
1900	428	+5.4%
1910	488	+14.0%
1923	475	−2.7%
1934	488	+2.7%
1939	485	−0.6%
1951	464	−4.3%
1961	405	−12.7%
1971	394	−2.7%
1981	387	−1.8%
1991	402	+3.9%
2001	384	−4.5%
2011	364	−5.2%
2021	364	+0.0%
