= Olbendorf =

- Municipality
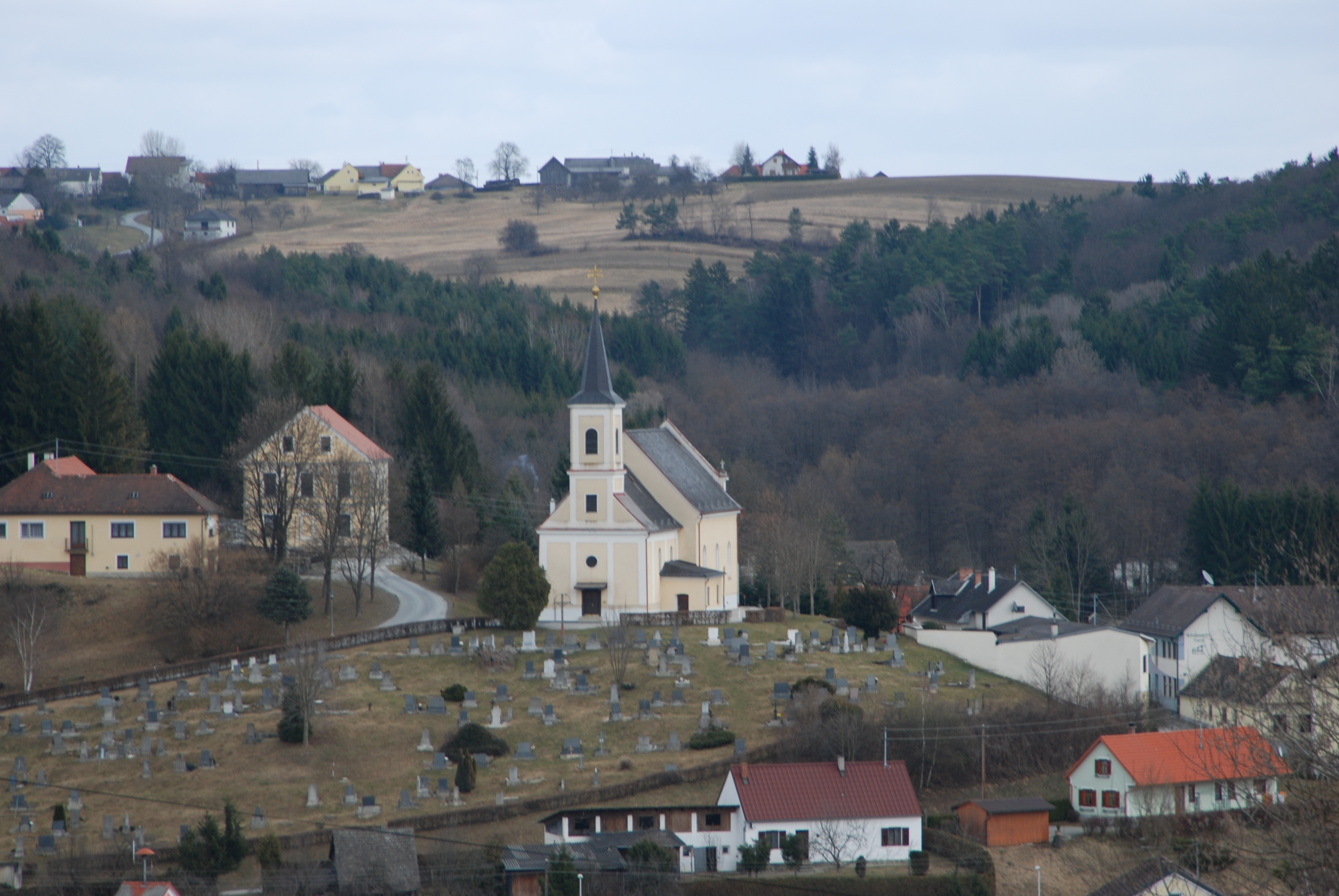
- View with parish church

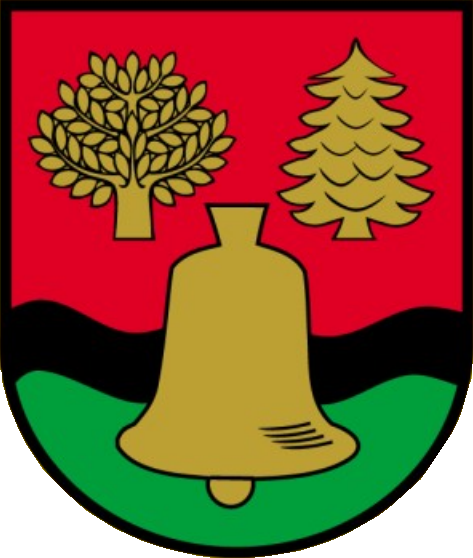
- Coat of arms

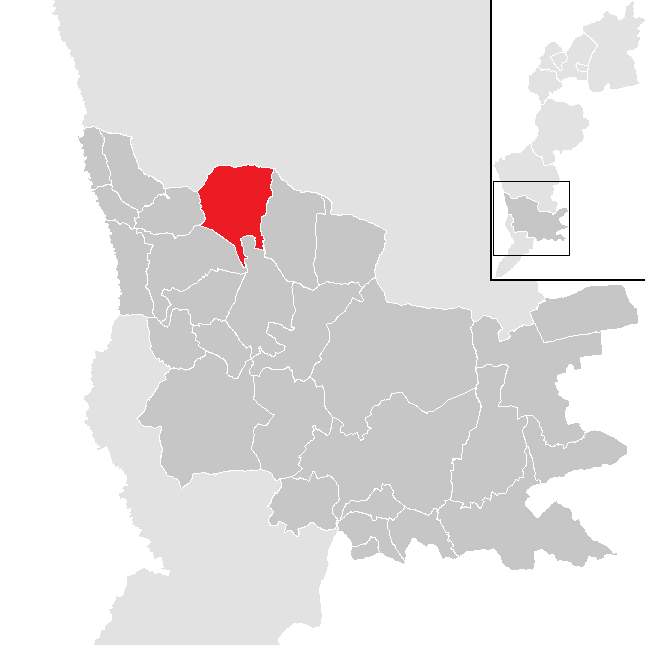
- Location within Güssing district

- Location within Austria
- Coordinates: 47°11′N 16°12′E
- Country: Austria
- State: Burgenland
- District: Güssing

Government
  - Mayor: Wolfgang Sodl (SPÖ)

Area
  - Total: 17.38 km^{2} (6.71 sq mi)

Population (2018-01-01)
  - Total: 1,449
  - Density: 83.37/km^{2} (215.9/sq mi)
- Time zone: UTC+1 (CET)
  - Summer (DST): UTC+2 (CEST)
- Postal code: 7534
- Website: www.olbendorf.at

Olbendorf (Croatian: Lovrenac, Hungarian: Óbér) is a town in the district of Güssing in the Austrian state of Burgenland.

== Population ==
Historical population
Year	Pop.	±%
1869	1,051	—
1880	1,176	+11.9%
1890	1,300	+10.5%
1900	1,476	+13.5%
1910	1,523	+3.2%
1923	1,529	+0.4%
1934	1,745	+14.1%
1939	1,609	−7.8%
1951	1,573	−2.2%
1961	1,588	+1.0%
1971	1,614	+1.6%
1981	1,658	+2.7%
1991	1,534	−7.5%
2001	1,394	−9.1%
2011	1,417	+1.6%
2021	1,457	+2.8%
