= Kleinmürbisch =

- Municipality
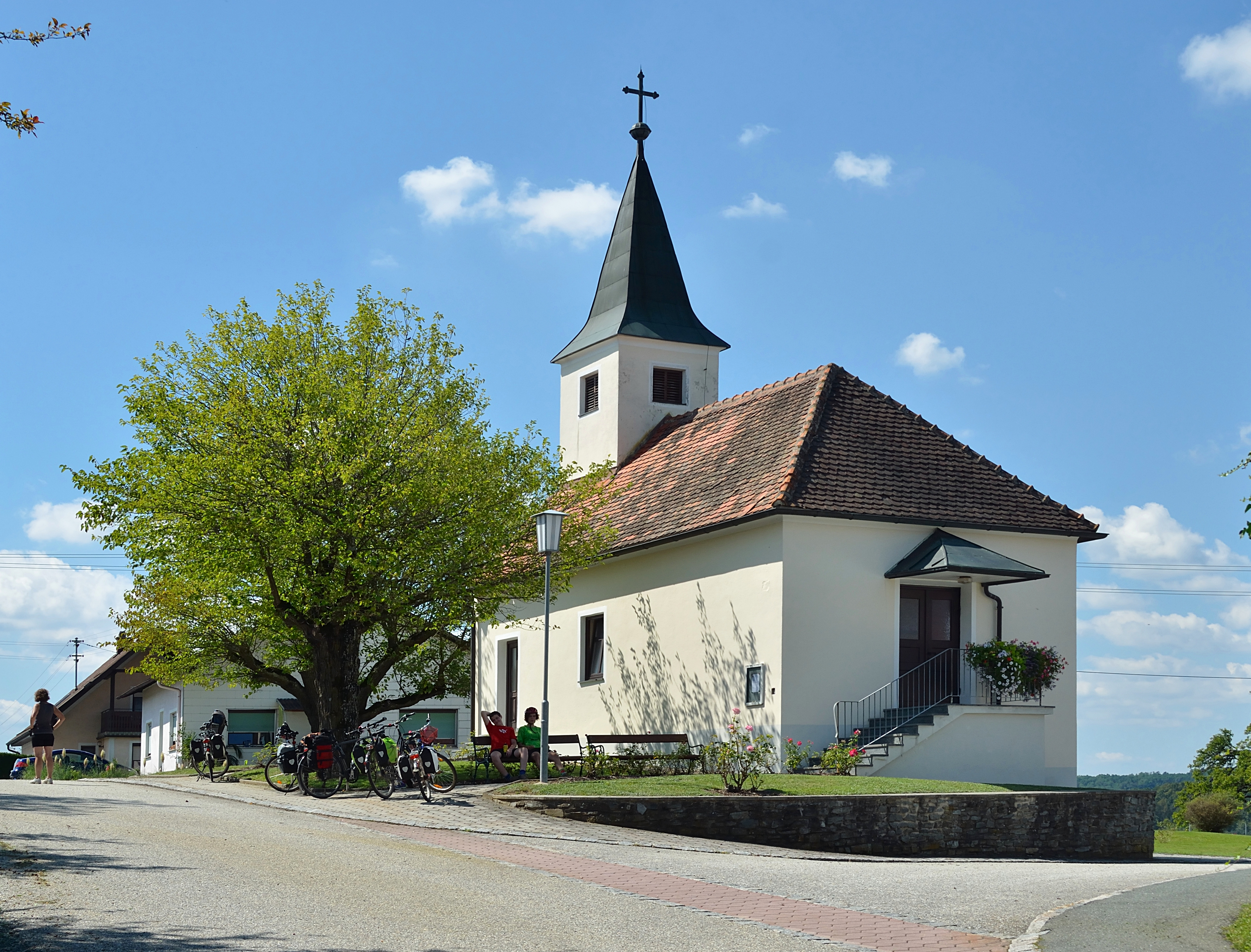
- Catholic church in Kleinmürbisch

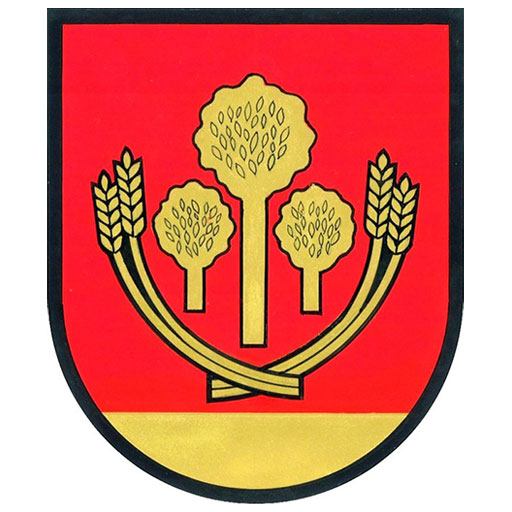
- Coat of arms

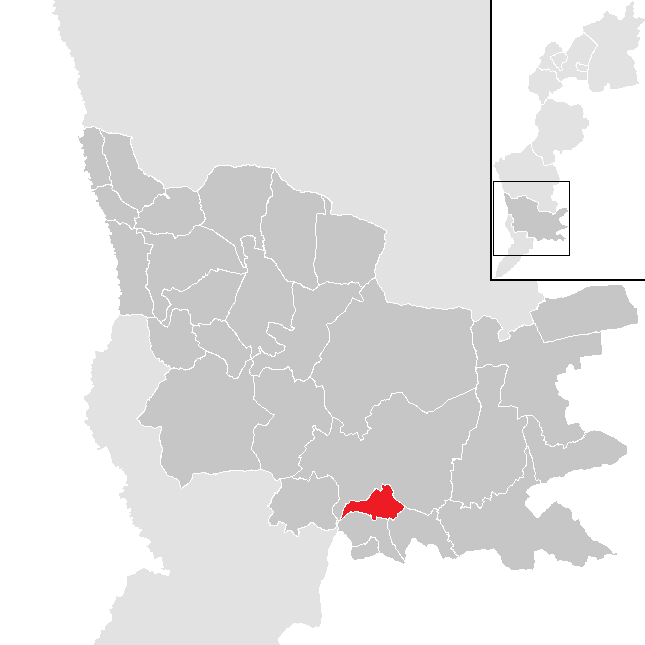
- Location within Güssing district

- Location within Austria
- Coordinates: 47°2′N 16°19′E
- Country: Austria
- State: Burgenland
- District: Güssing

Government
  - Mayor: Wolfgang Wolf (LWKLM)

Area
  - Total: 4.29 km^{2} (1.66 sq mi)

Population (2018-01-01)
  - Total: 226
  - Density: 52.7/km^{2} (136/sq mi)
- Time zone: UTC+1 (CET)
  - Summer (DST): UTC+2 (CEST)
- Postal code: 7540

Kleinmürbisch is a town in the district of Güssing in the Austrian state of Burgenland.

== Population ==
Historical population
Year	Pop.	±%
1869	313	—
1880	321	+2.6%
1890	397	+23.7%
1900	391	−1.5%
1910	359	−8.2%
1923	333	−7.2%
1934	344	+3.3%
1939	363	+5.5%
1951	275	−24.2%
1961	243	−11.6%
1971	268	+10.3%
1981	263	−1.9%
1991	258	−1.9%
2001	260	+0.8%
2011	256	−1.5%
2021	229	−10.5%
