= Tobaj =

- Municipality
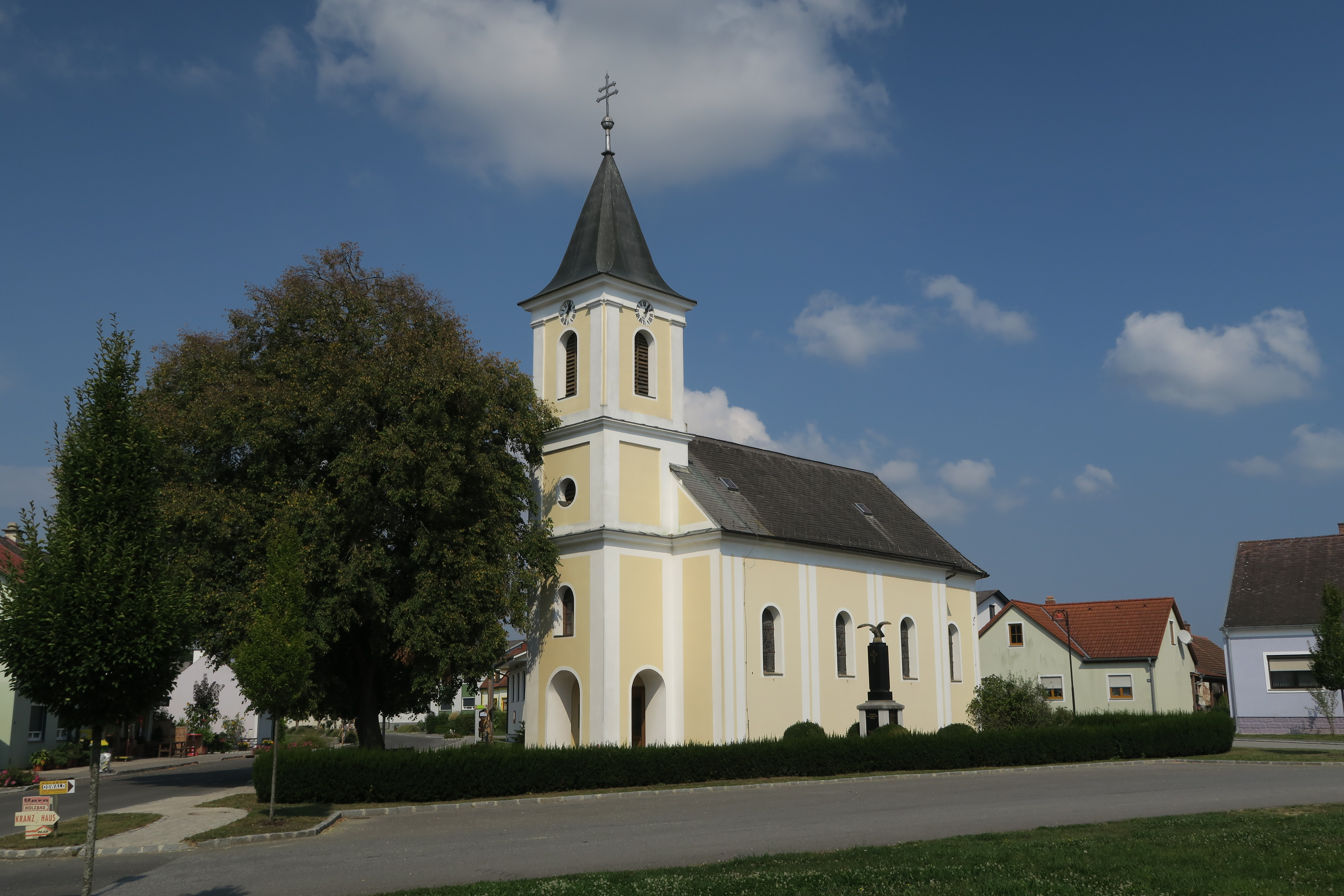
- Tobaj parish church

- Coat of arms

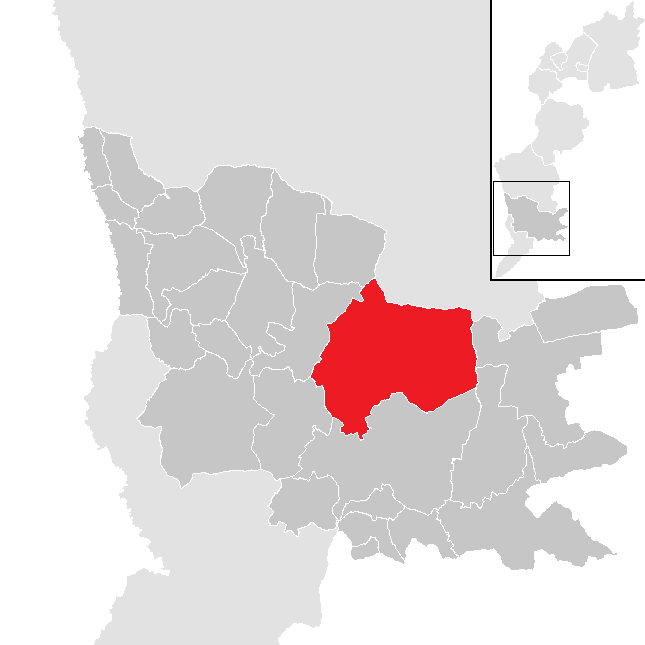
- Location within Güssing district

- Location within Austria
- Coordinates: 47°5′N 16°16′E
- Country: Austria
- State: Burgenland
- District: Güssing

Government
  - Mayor: Helmut Kopeszki (ÖVP)

Area
  - Total: 58.14 km^{2} (22.45 sq mi)

Population (2018-01-01)
  - Total: 1,372
  - Density: 23.60/km^{2} (61.12/sq mi)
- Time zone: UTC+1 (CET)
  - Summer (DST): UTC+2 (CEST)
- Postal code: 7540

Tobaj (same in Croatian and Hungarian) is a town in the district of Güssing in the Austrian state of Burgenland.

== Population ==
Historical population
Year	Pop.	±%
1869	2,247	—
1880	2,278	+1.4%
1890	2,596	+14.0%
1900	2,678	+3.2%
1910	2,455	−8.3%
1923	2,282	−7.0%
1934	2,182	−4.4%
1939	1,996	−8.5%
1951	1,848	−7.4%
1961	1,637	−11.4%
1971	1,579	−3.5%
1981	1,459	−7.6%
1991	1,447	−0.8%
2001	1,386	−4.2%
2011	1,391	+0.4%
