= Güssing District =

Coordinates: 47.118°N 16.261°E

Güssing District Bezirk Güssing
- District
- Country: Austria
- State: Burgenland
- Number of municipalities: 28
- Administrative seat: Güssing

Government
  - District Governor: Nicole Christina Wild

Area
  - Total: 486.71 km^{2} (187.92 sq mi)

Population (2022)
  - Total: 25,668
  - Density: 52.738/km^{2} (136.59/sq mi)
- Time zone: UTC+01:00 (CET)
  - Summer (DST): UTC+02:00 (CEST)
- Vehicle registration: E
- NUTS code: AT113

The Bezirk Güssing (Croatian: Kotar Novi Grad; Hungarian: Németújvár Járás) is an administrative district (Bezirk) in the federal state of Burgenland, Austria, bordering on Vas County of Hungary, of which it had been a part prior to 1921.

The area of the district is 486.71km², with a population of 25,668 (2022), and the population density is 53 persons per km^{2}. The administrative center and the largest settlement in the district is Güssing. Other main settlements include Stegersbach, Kukmirn and Olbendorf.

== Administrative divisions ==
The district consists of the below municipalities and towns.

- Bildein
- Bocksdorf
- Burgauberg-Neudauberg
- Eberau
- Gerersdorf-Sulz
- Großmürbisch
- Güssing
- Güttenbach
- Hackerberg
- Heiligenbrunn
- Heugraben
- Inzenhof
- Kleinmürbisch
- Kukmirn
- Moschendorf
- Neuberg im Burgenland
- Neustift bei Güssing
- Olbendorf
- Ollersdorf im Burgenland
- Rauchwart
- Rohr im Burgenland
- Sankt Michael im Burgenland
- Stegersbach
- Stinatz
- Strem
- Tobaj
- Tschanigraben
- Wörterberg
