= Güttenbach =

- Municipality
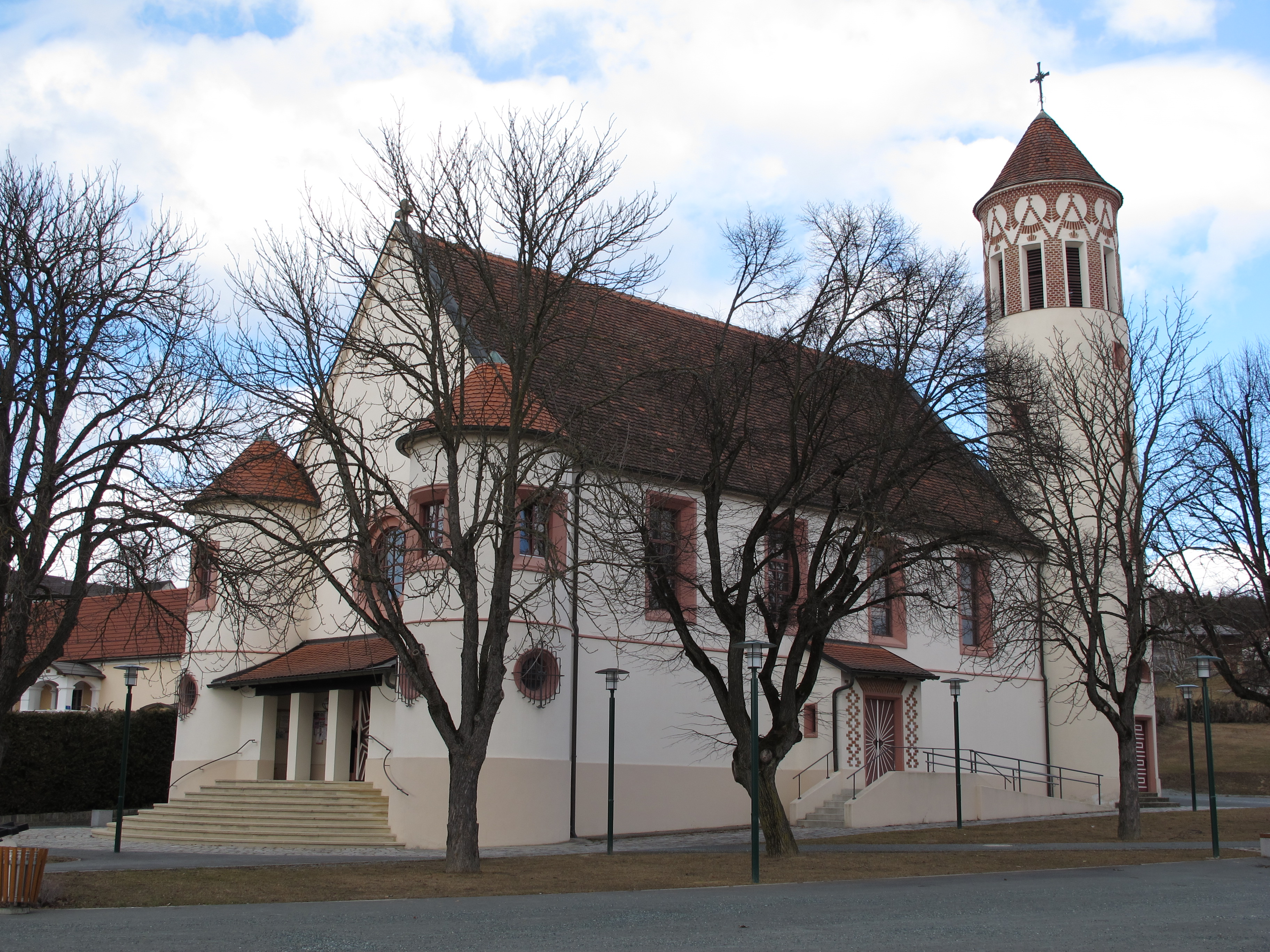
- Güttenbach parish church

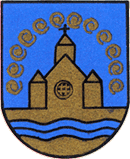
- Coat of arms

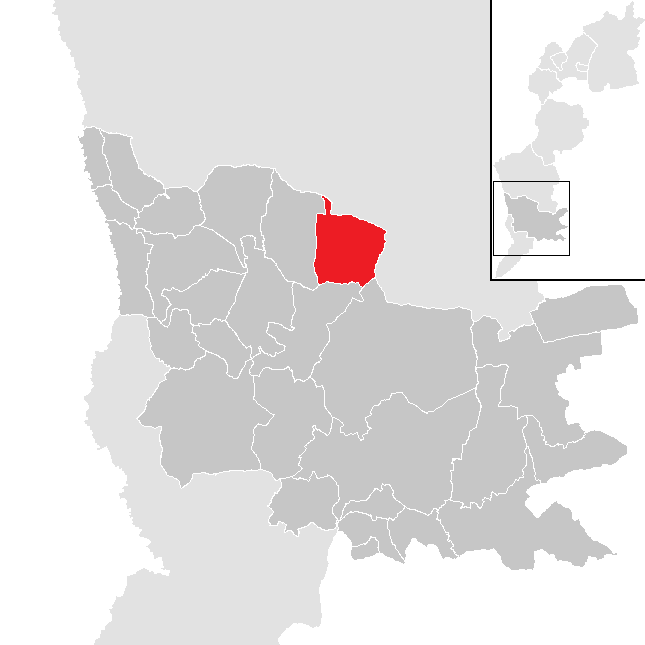
- Location within Güssing district

- Location within Austria
- Coordinates: 47°10′N 16°17′E
- Country: Austria
- State: Burgenland
- District: Güssing

Government
  - Mayor: Leo Radakovits (ÖVP)

Area
  - Total: 15.9 km^{2} (6.1 sq mi)
- Elevation: 263 m (863 ft)

Population (2018-01-01)
  - Total: 898
  - Density: 56.5/km^{2} (146/sq mi)
- Time zone: UTC+1 (CET)
  - Summer (DST): UTC+2 (CEST)
- Postal code: 7536
- Area code: 03327
- Website: www.guettenbach.at

Güttenbach (Croatian: Pinkovac, Hungarian: Pinkóc, Slovene: Pinkovec, Pinkovci) is a town in the district of Güssing in the Austrian state of Burgenland.

== Population ==
Historical population
Year	Pop.	±%
1869	656	—
1880	717	+9.3%
1890	725	+1.1%
1900	910	+25.5%
1910	1,002	+10.1%
1923	936	−6.6%
1934	1,013	+8.2%
1939	927	−8.5%
1951	1,056	+13.9%
1961	1,050	−0.6%
1971	1,117	+6.4%
1981	1,105	−1.1%
1991	1,111	+0.5%
2001	1,026	−7.7%
2011	936	−8.8%
2021	883	−5.7%

== Partner communities ==
- Malinska-Dubašnica, Croatia
- Szentpéterfa, Hungary
