= Bocksdorf =

- Municipality
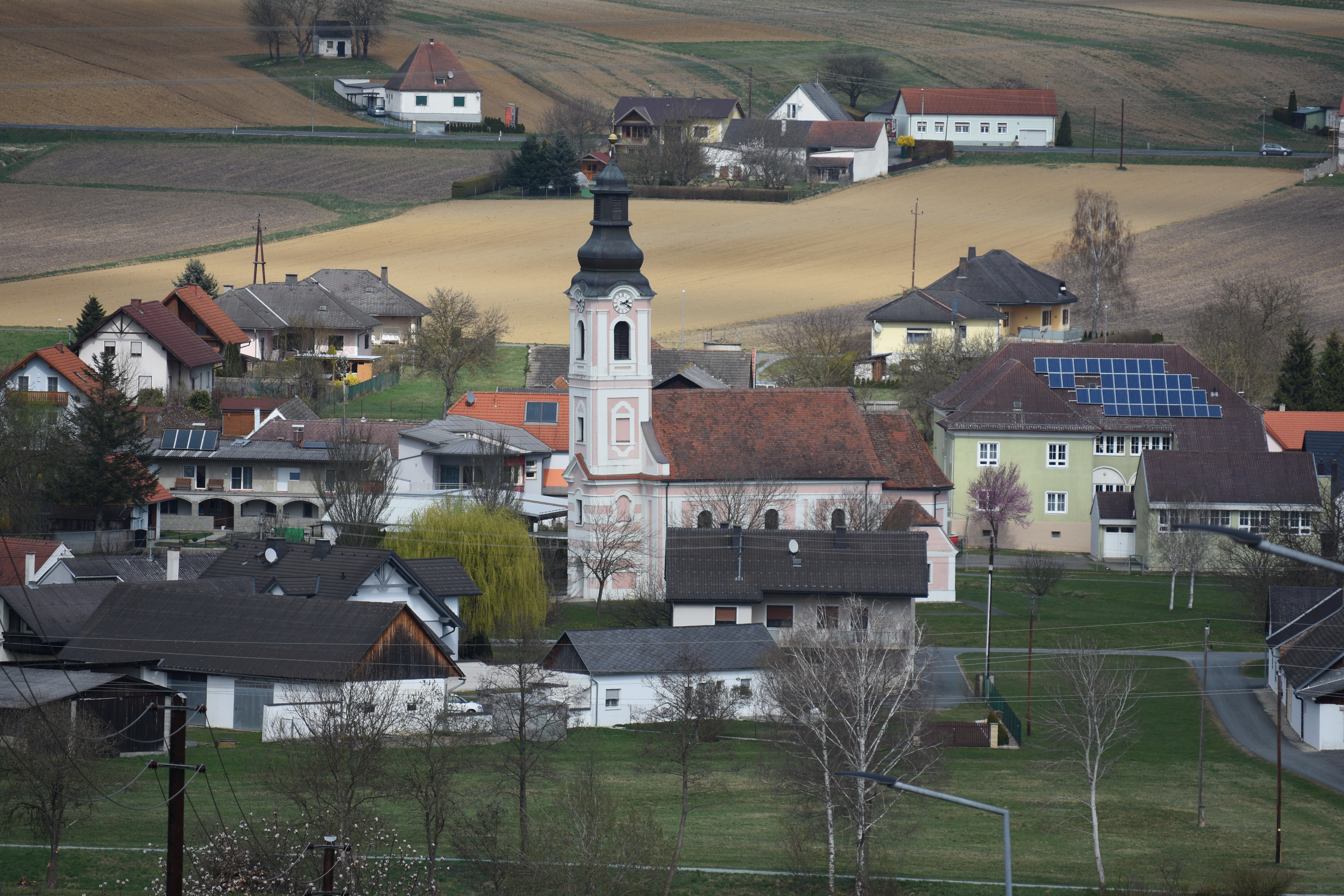

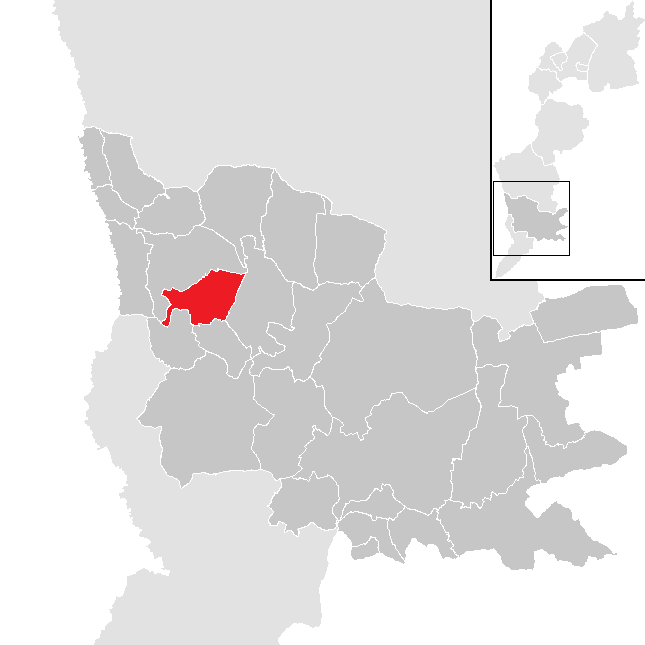
- Location within Güssing district

- Location within Austria
- Coordinates: 47°9′N 16°11′E
- Country: Austria
- State: Burgenland
- District: Güssing

Government
  - Mayor: Franz Pelzmann (SPÖ)

Area
  - Total: 9.99 km^{2} (3.86 sq mi)
- Elevation: 244 m (801 ft)

Population (2018-01-01)
  - Total: 813
  - Density: 81.4/km^{2} (211/sq mi)
- Time zone: UTC+1 (CET)
  - Summer (DST): UTC+2 (CEST)
- Postal code: 7551
- Website: www.bocksdorf.at

Bocksdorf (Hungarian: Baksafalva) is a municipality in the district of Güssing in the Austrian state of Burgenland.

== Population ==
Historical population
Year	Pop.	±%
1869	1,048	—
1880	1,216	+16.0%
1890	1,385	+13.9%
1900	1,344	−3.0%
1910	1,365	+1.6%
1923	1,225	−10.3%
1934	1,252	+2.2%
1939	991	−20.8%
1951	970	−2.1%
1961	899	−7.3%
1971	886	−1.4%
1981	928	+4.7%
1991	816	−12.1%
2001	791	−3.1%
2011	808	+2.1%
2021	815	+0.9%
