= Heugraben =

- Municipality
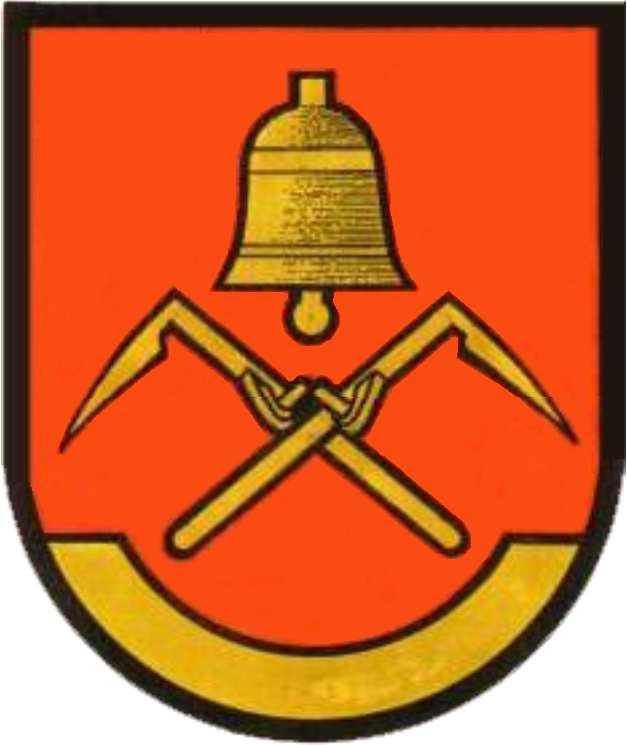
- Coat of arms

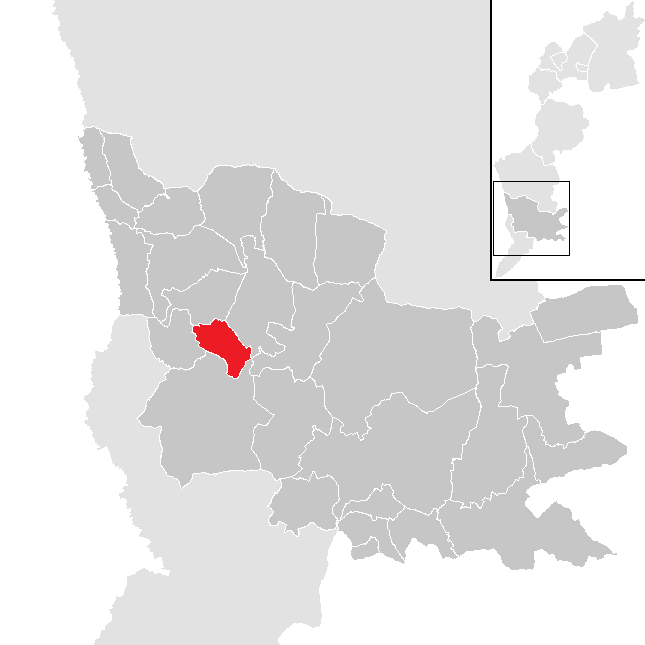
- Location within Güssing district

- Location within Austria
- Coordinates: 47°7′N 16°11′E
- Country: Austria
- State: Burgenland
- District: Güssing

Government
  - Mayor: Walter Zloklikovits (SPÖ)

Area
  - Total: 6.47 km^{2} (2.50 sq mi)

Population (2018-01-01)
  - Total: 216
  - Density: 33.4/km^{2} (86.5/sq mi)
- Time zone: UTC+1 (CET)
  - Summer (DST): UTC+2 (CEST)
- Postal code: 7551

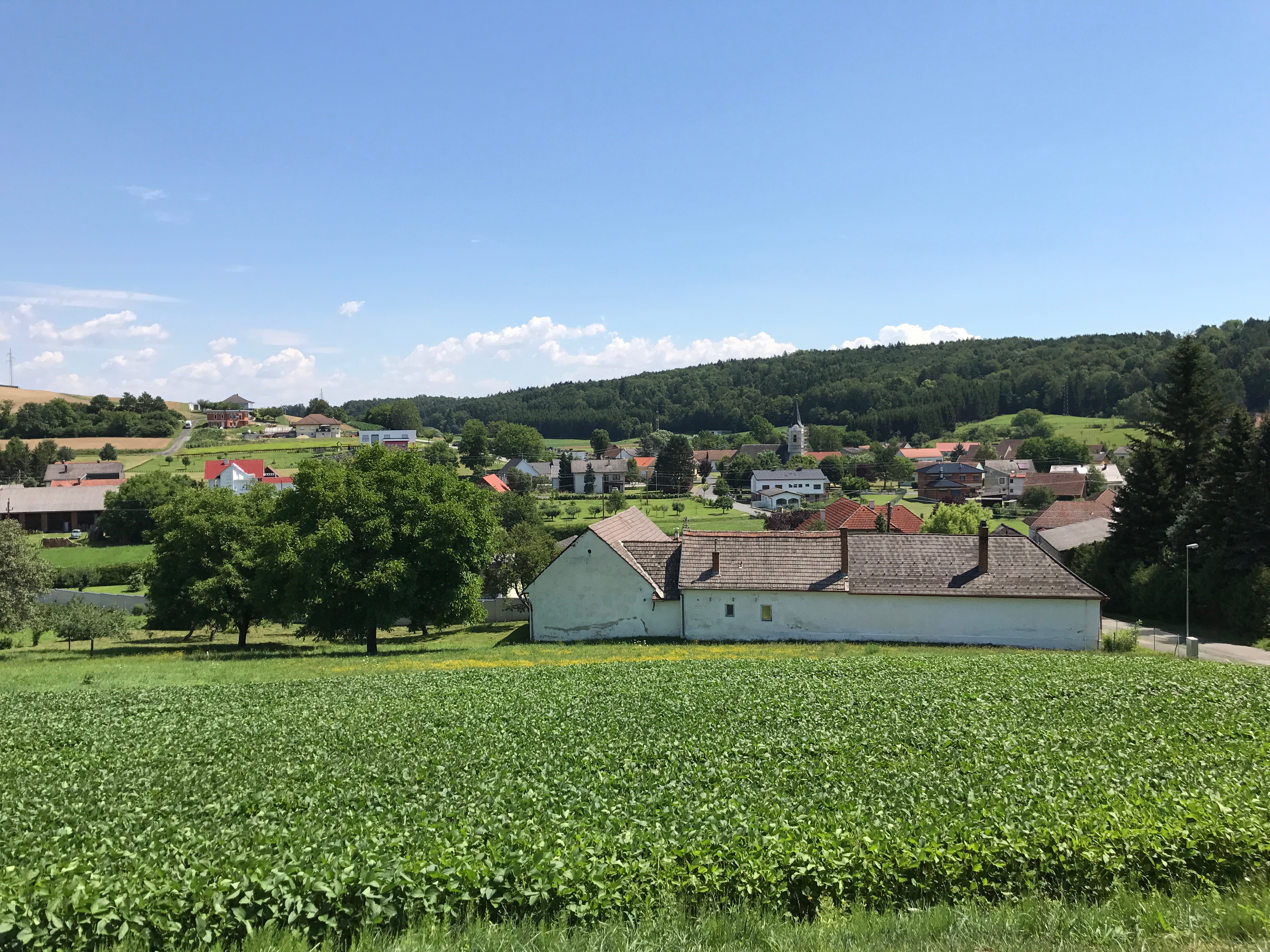

Heugraben is a town in the district of Güssing in the Austrian state of Burgenland.

== Population ==
Historical population
Year	Pop.	±%
1869	443	—
1880	441	−0.5%
1890	531	+20.4%
1900	488	−8.1%
1910	487	−0.2%
1923	481	−1.2%
1934	421	−12.5%
1939	386	−8.3%
1951	367	−4.9%
1961	281	−23.4%
1971	275	−2.1%
1981	261	−5.1%
1991	251	−3.8%
2001	250	−0.4%
2011	229	−8.4%
2021	227	−0.9%
