= Rohr im Burgenland =

- Municipality
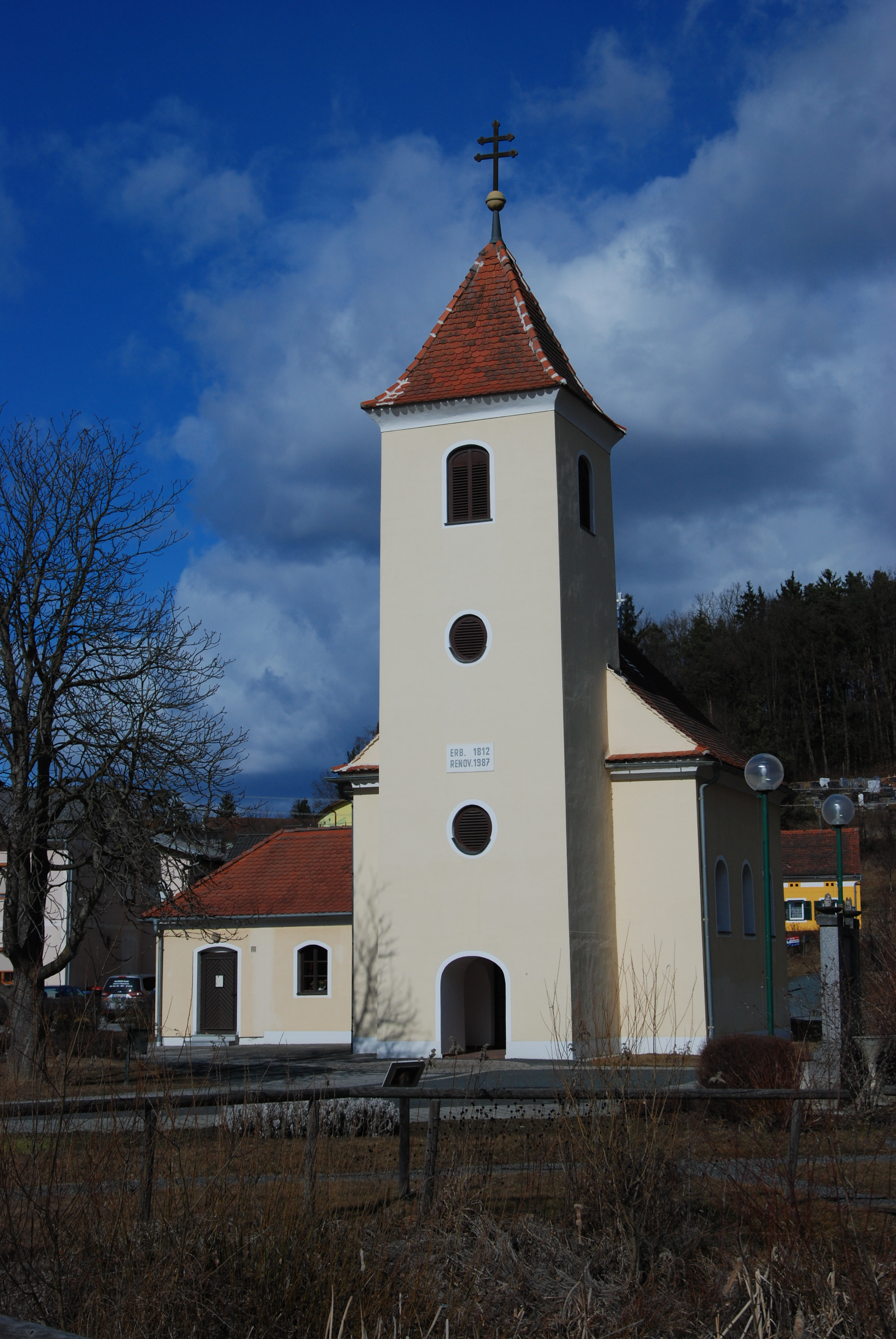
- Catholic church in Rohr

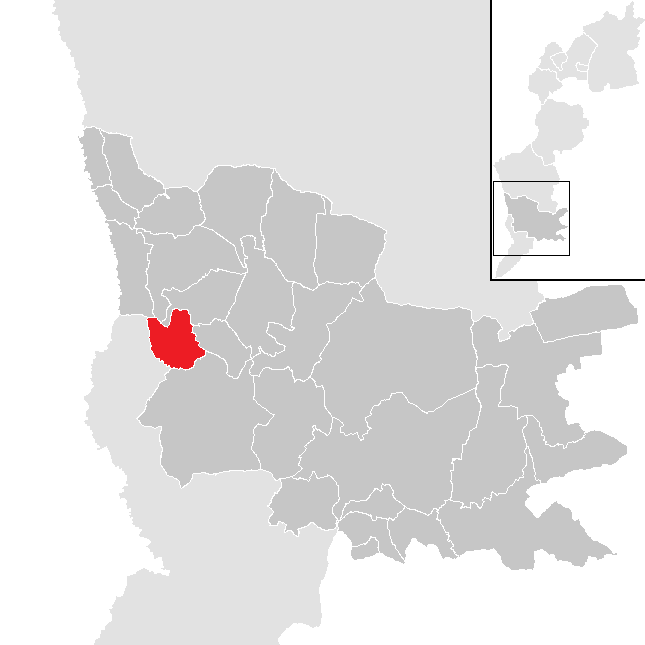
- Location within Güssing district

- Location within Austria
- Coordinates: 47°8′N 16°14′E
- Country: Austria
- State: Burgenland
- District: Güssing

Government
  - Mayor: Gernot Kremsner (Liste Rohr)

Area
  - Total: 8.38 km^{2} (3.24 sq mi)

Population (2018-01-01)
  - Total: 380
  - Density: 45/km^{2} (120/sq mi)
- Time zone: UTC+1 (CET)
  - Summer (DST): UTC+2 (CEST)
- Postal code: 7551

Rohr im Burgenland (Hungarian: Nád or Nádfalu) is a town in the district of Güssing in the Austrian state of Burgenland.

== Population ==
Historical population
Year	Pop.	±%
1869	475	—
1880	544	+14.5%
1890	626	+15.1%
1900	635	+1.4%
1910	625	−1.6%
1923	602	−3.7%
1934	579	−3.8%
1939	519	−10.4%
1951	457	−11.9%
1961	440	−3.7%
1971	397	−9.8%
1981	426	+7.3%
1991	378	−11.3%
2001	394	+4.2%
2011	398	+1.0%
