= Gerersdorf-Sulz =

- Municipality
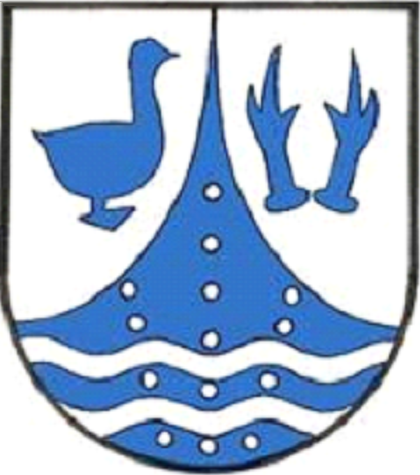
- Coat of arms

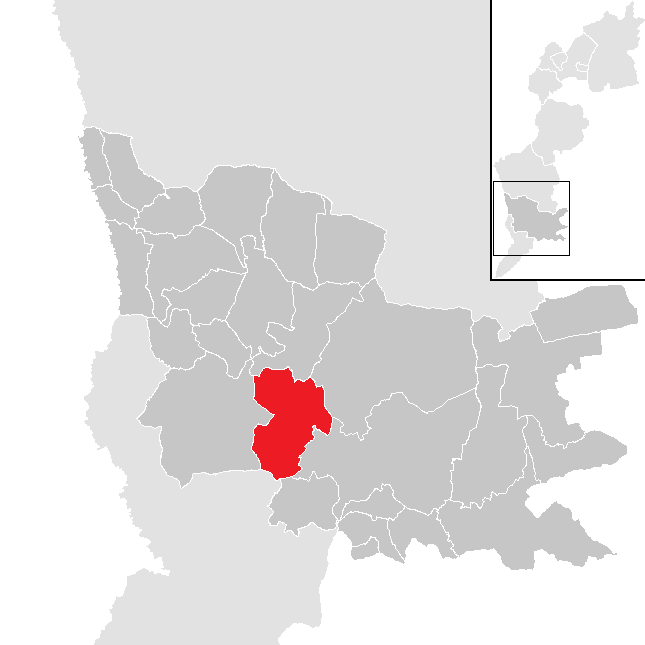
- Location within Güssing district

- Location within Austria
- Coordinates: 47°4′N 16°15′E
- Country: Austria
- State: Burgenland
- District: Güssing

Government
  - Mayor: Roman Jandrisevits (SPÖ)

Area
  - Total: 21.63 km^{2} (8.35 sq mi)
- Elevation: 226 m (741 ft)

Population (2018-01-01)
  - Total: 1,014
  - Density: 46.88/km^{2} (121.4/sq mi)
- Time zone: UTC+1 (CET)
  - Summer (DST): UTC+2 (CEST)
- Postal code: 7541
- Website: www.gerersdorf-sulz.at

Gerersdorf-Sulz (Hungarian: Németszentgrót-Sóskútfalu) is a municipality in the district of Güssing in the Austrian state of Burgenland.

== Population ==
Historical population
Year	Pop.	±%
1869	1,833	—
1880	1,849	+0.9%
1890	2,078	+12.4%
1900	1,964	−5.5%
1910	1,823	−7.2%
1923	1,698	−6.9%
1934	1,604	−5.5%
1939	1,411	−12.0%
1951	1,459	+3.4%
1961	1,215	−16.7%
1971	1,177	−3.1%
1981	1,148	−2.5%
1991	1,093	−4.8%
2001	1,057	−3.3%
2011	1,050	−0.7%
2021	1,003	−4.5%
