= Inzenhof =

- Municipality
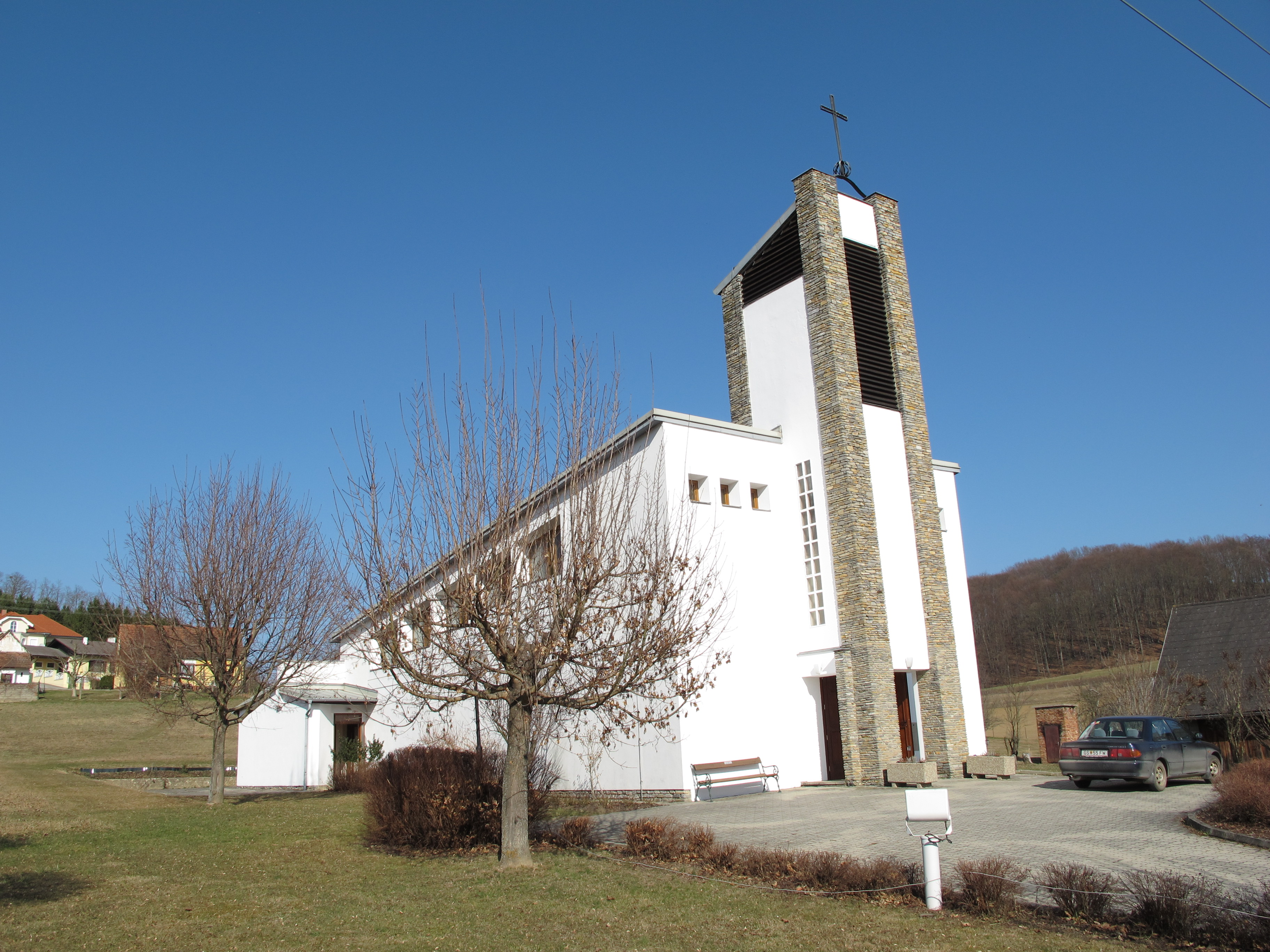
- Inzenhof parish church

- Coat of arms

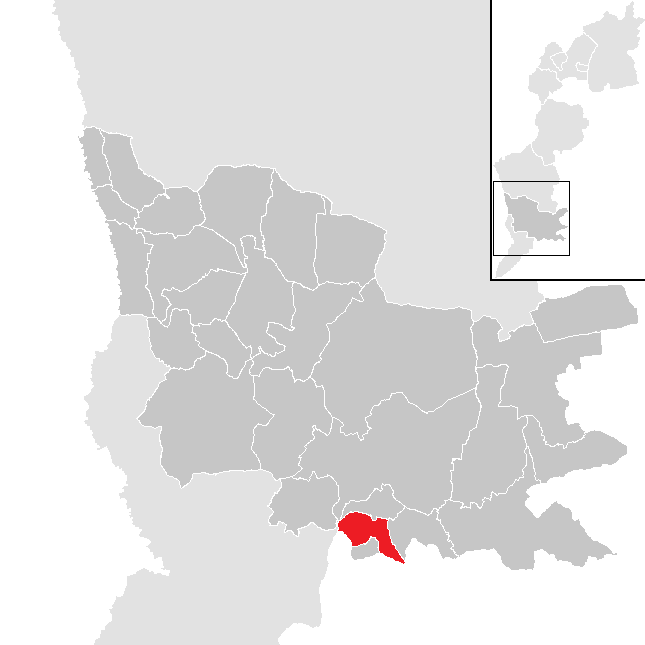
- Location within Güssing district

- Location within Austria
- Coordinates: 47°1′N 16°19′E
- Country: Austria
- State: Burgenland
- District: Güssing

Government
  - Mayor: Jürgen Schabhüttl (SPÖ)

Area
  - Total: 5.97 km^{2} (2.31 sq mi)

Population (2018-01-01)
  - Total: 334
  - Density: 55.9/km^{2} (145/sq mi)
- Time zone: UTC+1 (CET)
  - Summer (DST): UTC+2 (CEST)
- Postal code: 7540

Inzenhof is a town in the district of Güssing in the Austrian state of Burgenland.

== Population ==
Historical population
Year	Pop.	±%
1869	668	—
1880	618	−7.5%
1890	687	+11.2%
1900	687	+0.0%
1910	615	−10.5%
1923	580	−5.7%
1934	612	+5.5%
1939	525	−14.2%
1951	612	+16.6%
1961	558	−8.8%
1971	497	−10.9%
1981	429	−13.7%
1991	369	−14.0%
2001	336	−8.9%
2011	330	−1.8%
2021	330	+0.0%
