= Sankt Michael im Burgenland =

- Municipality
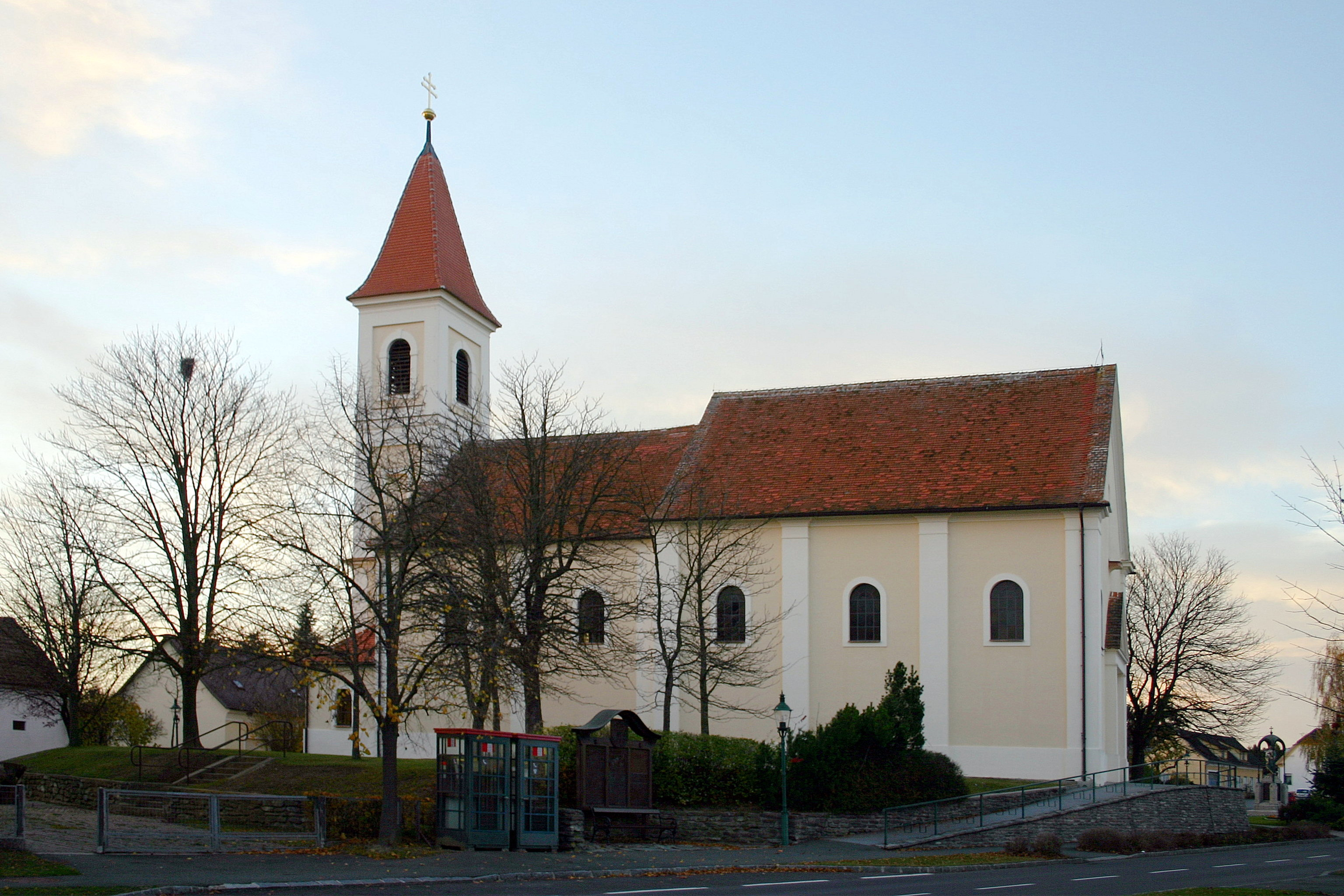
- Sankt Michael im Burgenland parish church

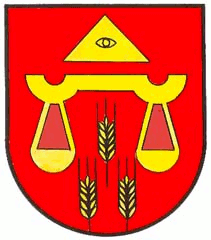
- Coat of arms

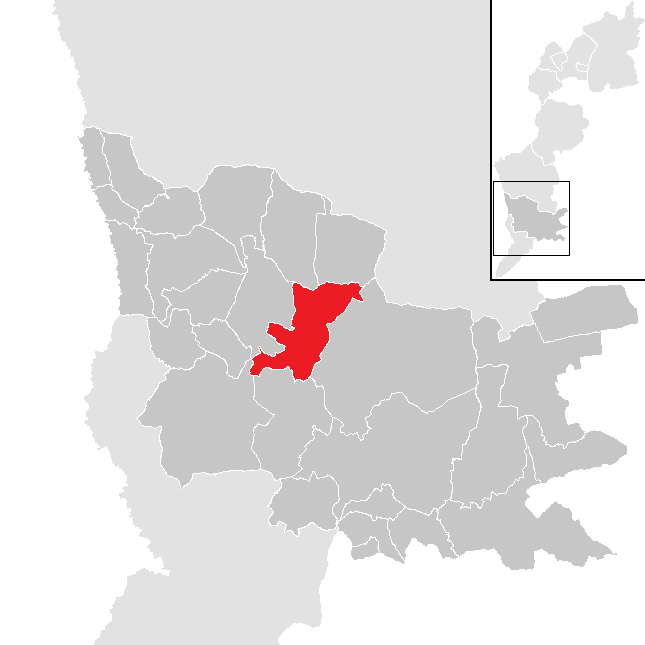
- Location within Güssing district

- Location within Austria
- Coordinates: 47°8′N 16°14′E
- Country: Austria
- State: Burgenland
- District: Güssing

Government
  - Mayor: Erich Sziderits (ÖVP)

Area
  - Total: 18.38 km^{2} (7.10 sq mi)

Population (2018-01-01)
  - Total: 963
  - Density: 52.4/km^{2} (136/sq mi)
- Time zone: UTC+1 (CET)
  - Summer (DST): UTC+2 (CEST)
- Postal code: 7535
- Website: www.st.michael-bgld.at

Sankt Michael im Burgenland (Hungarian: Pusztaszentmihály) is a town in the district of Güssing in the Austrian state of Burgenland.

== Population ==
Historical population
Year	Pop.	±%
1869	1,911	—
1880	2,066	+8.1%
1890	2,197	+6.3%
1900	2,244	+2.1%
1910	2,141	−4.6%
1923	2,062	−3.7%
1934	2,307	+11.9%
1939	2,559	+10.9%
1951	2,268	−11.4%
1961	2,363	+4.2%
1971	2,546	+7.7%
1981	2,603	+2.2%
1991	2,608	+0.2%
2001	2,762	+5.9%
2011	2,732	−1.1%
