= Moschendorf =

- Municipality
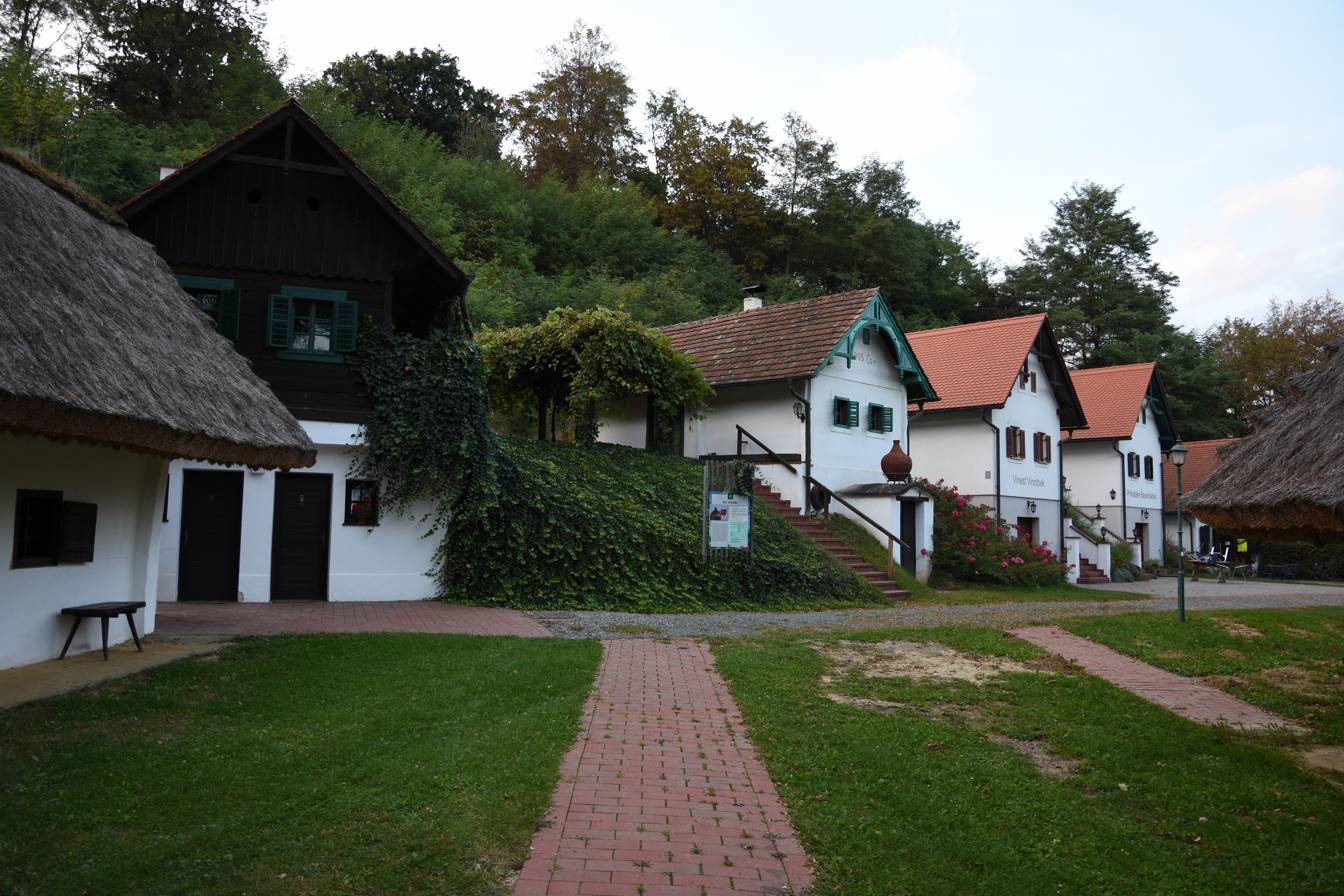
- Wine cellars and wine museum in Moschendorf

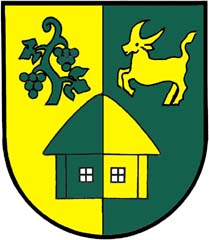
- Coat of arms

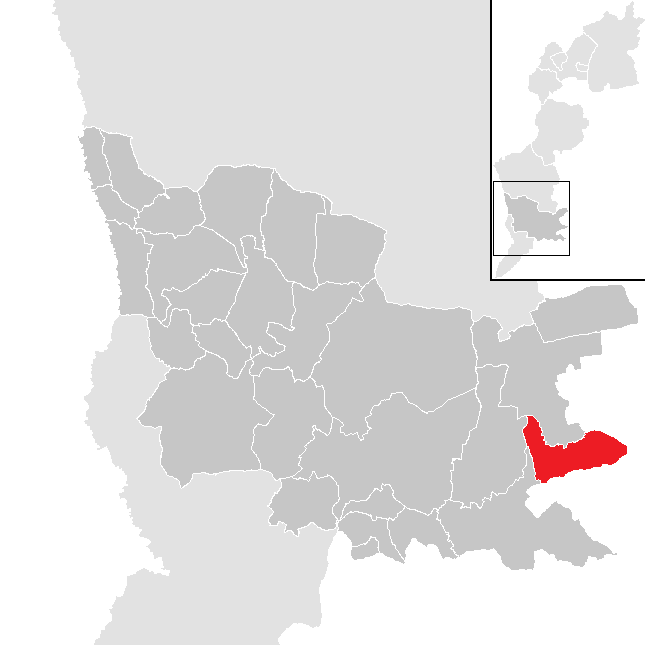
- Location within Güssing district

- Location within Austria
- Coordinates: 47°3′16″N 16°28′45″E
- Country: Austria
- State: Burgenland
- District: Güssing

Government
  - Mayor: Thomas Behm (ÖVP)

Area
  - Total: 13.18 km^{2} (5.09 sq mi)

Population (2018-01-01)
  - Total: 400
  - Density: 30/km^{2} (79/sq mi)
- Time zone: UTC+1 (CET)
  - Summer (DST): UTC+2 (CEST)
- Postal code: 7540

Moschendorf (Hungarian: Nagysároslak, Német-Sároslak) is a town in the district of Güssing in the Austrian state of Burgenland.

The place was originally known as "Lak", or habitation, dwelling as far back as the 13th century. In 1482 it became Saroslak, essentially meaning boggy habitation. The actual name of Moschendorf first appeared sometime in the 17th century when it was first documented as Mos, Moos, or in English Moor. Mos-chen-dorf was probably used to indicate its nature as a habitation or dwelling within a small peaty bog or moor. The initial landlords of Moschendorf were the Batthyány of Güssing, and then in the 17th century they ruled from Körmend. The 17th century was a difficult period for many in Moschendorf. It is during this time that the population was decreased to two-thirds its original size due to wars, pestilence and occasionally flooding from the nearby river, the Pinka. It was not until the 18th century that the development of the town truly began.

== Population ==
Historical population
Year	Pop.	±%
1869	841	—
1880	830	−1.3%
1890	940	+13.3%
1900	979	+4.1%
1910	884	−9.7%
1923	852	−3.6%
1934	784	−8.0%
1939	746	−4.8%
1951	660	−11.5%
1961	617	−6.5%
1971	561	−9.1%
1981	469	−16.4%
1991	453	−3.4%
2001	453	+0.0%
2011	412	−9.1%
2021	386	−6.3%
