= Strem =

- Municipality
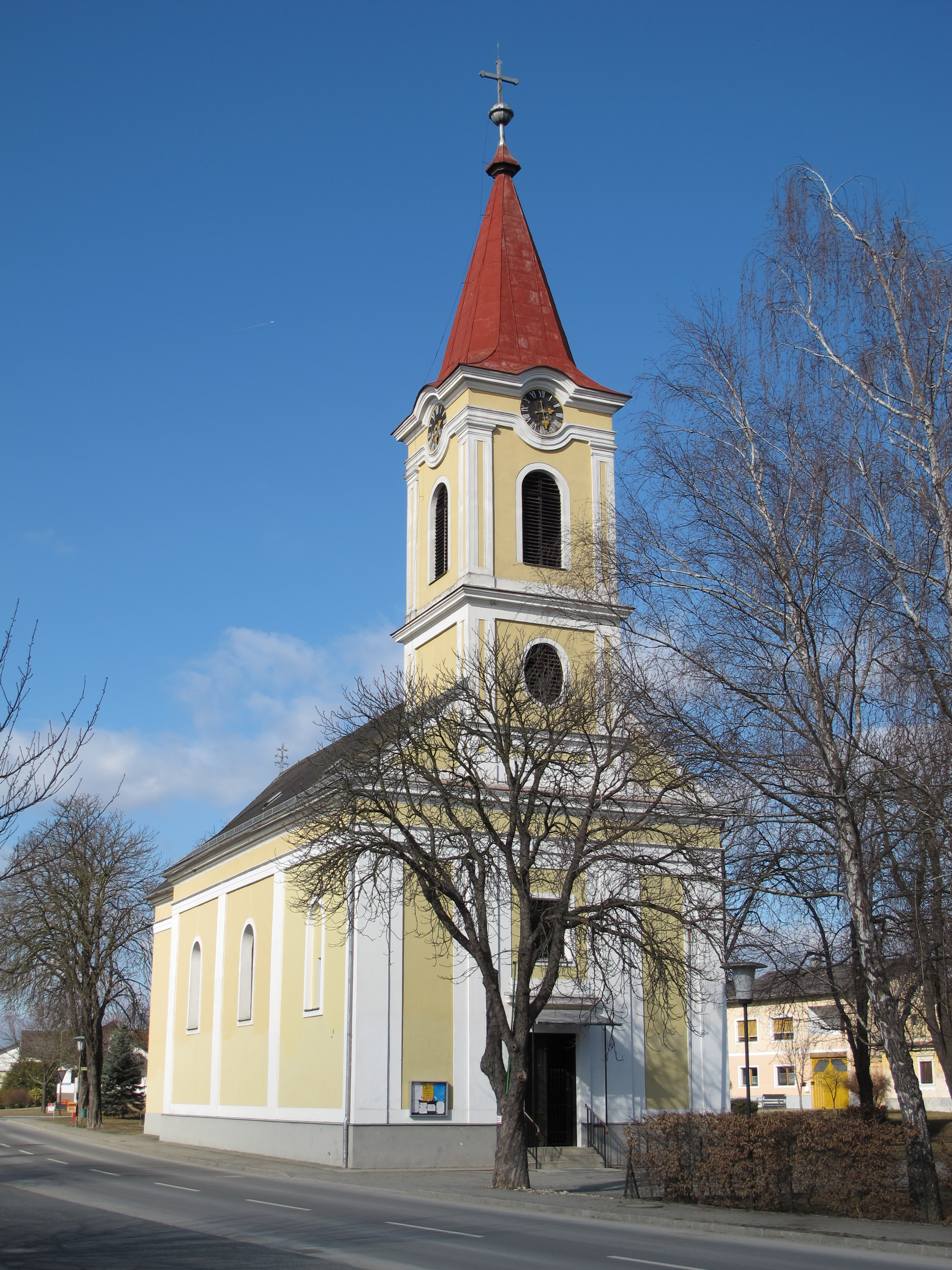
- Strem parish church

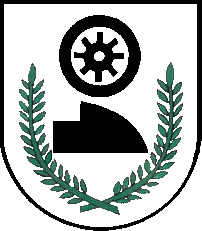
- Coat of arms

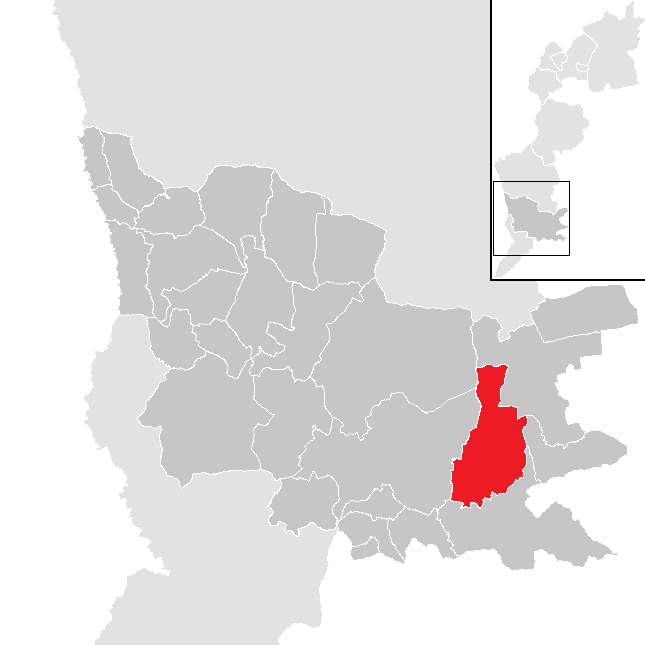
- Location within Güssing district

- Location within Austria
- Coordinates: 47°3′N 16°25′E
- Country: Austria
- State: Burgenland
- District: Güssing

Government
  - Mayor: Bernhard Deutsch (ÖVP)

Area
  - Total: 23.78 km^{2} (9.18 sq mi)
- Elevation: 207 m (679 ft)

Population (2018-01-01)
  - Total: 900
  - Density: 38/km^{2} (98/sq mi)
- Time zone: UTC+1 (CET)
  - Summer (DST): UTC+2 (CEST)
- Postal code: 7522
- Website: www.strem.co.at

Strem (Hungarian: Strém) is a town in the district of Güssing in the Austrian state of Burgenland.

== Population ==
Historical population
Year	Pop.	±%
1869	1,199	—
1880	1,284	+7.1%
1890	1,447	+12.7%
1900	1,512	+4.5%
1910	1,383	−8.5%
1923	1,285	−7.1%
1934	1,214	−5.5%
1939	1,078	−11.2%
1951	1,093	+1.4%
1961	997	−8.8%
1971	990	−0.7%
1981	985	−0.5%
1991	950	−3.6%
2001	949	−0.1%
2011	942	−0.7%
