= Großmürbisch =

- Municipality
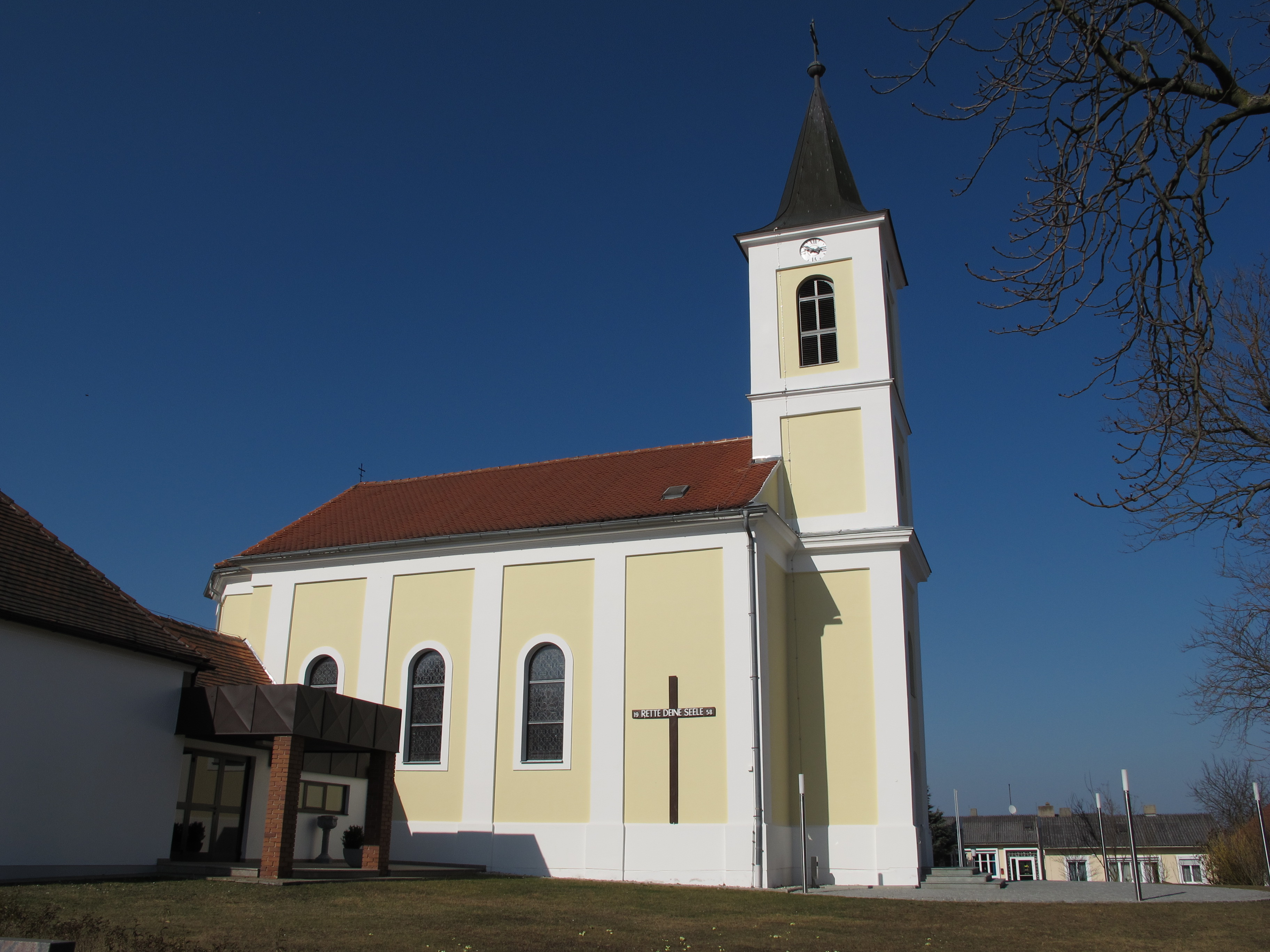
- Großmürbisch parish church

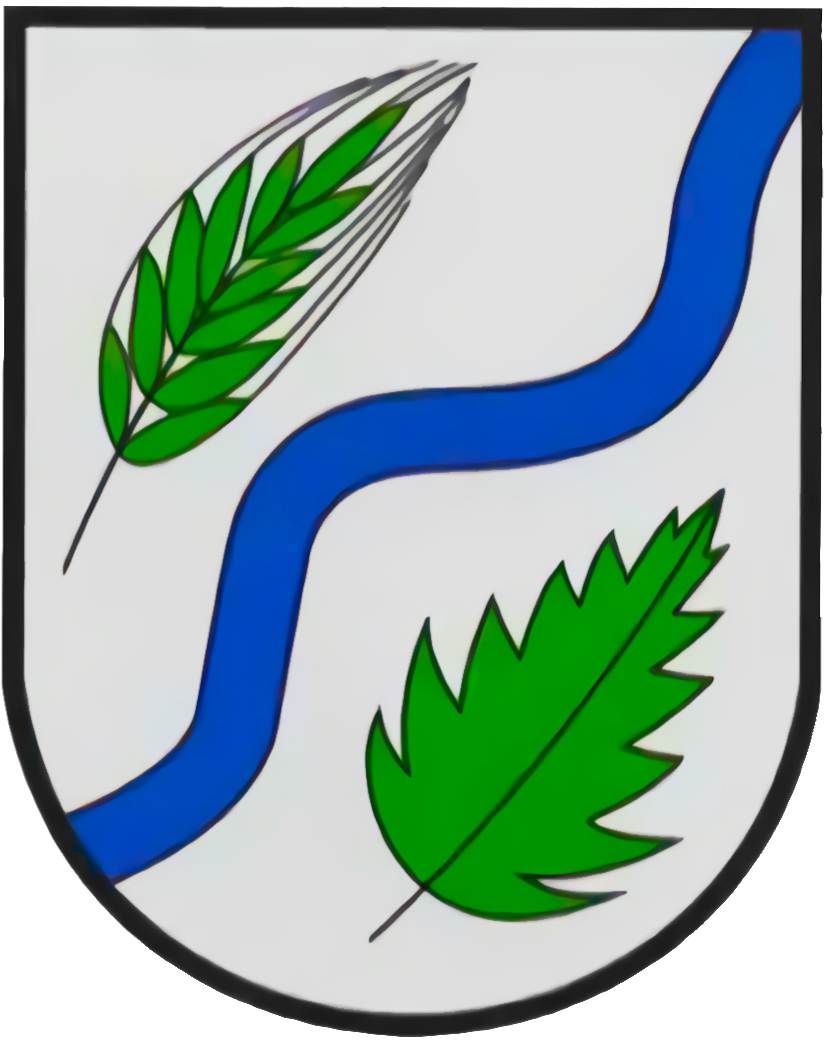
- Coat of arms

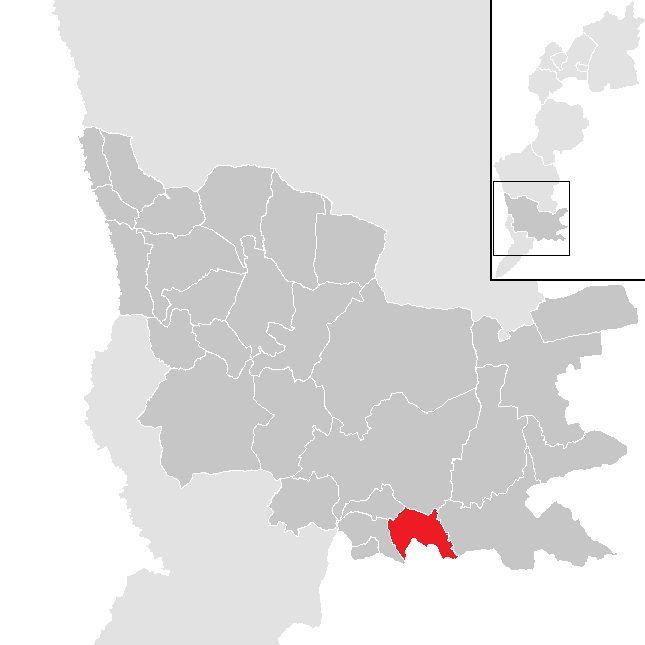
- Location within Güssing district

- Location within Austria
- Coordinates: 47°1′N 16°22′E
- Country: Austria
- State: Burgenland
- District: Güssing

Government
  - Mayor: Jürgen Kurta (ÖVP)

Area
  - Total: 7.92 km^{2} (3.06 sq mi)
- Elevation: 293 m (961 ft)

Population (2022-01-01)
  - Total: 233
  - Density: 29.4/km^{2} (76.2/sq mi)
- Time zone: UTC+1 (CET)
  - Summer (DST): UTC+2 (CEST)
- Postal code: 7540
- Website: www.grossmuerbisch.at

Großmürbisch is a village in the district of Güssing in Burgenland in south-eastern Austria. It is located at 47°1′N 16°22′E and has a population of 233 (2022). The village was the home of Frank Hoffmann until his death in 2022.

== Population ==
Historical population
Year	Pop.	±%
1869	563	—
1880	551	−2.1%
1890	698	+26.7%
1900	695	−0.4%
1910	628	−9.6%
1923	598	−4.8%
1934	557	−6.9%
1939	506	−9.2%
1951	508	+0.4%
1961	412	−18.9%
1971	395	−4.1%
1981	386	−2.3%
1991	303	−21.5%
2001	274	−9.6%
2011	268	−2.2%
2021	235	−12.3%
2022	233	−0.9%
