= Neustift bei Güssing =

- Municipality
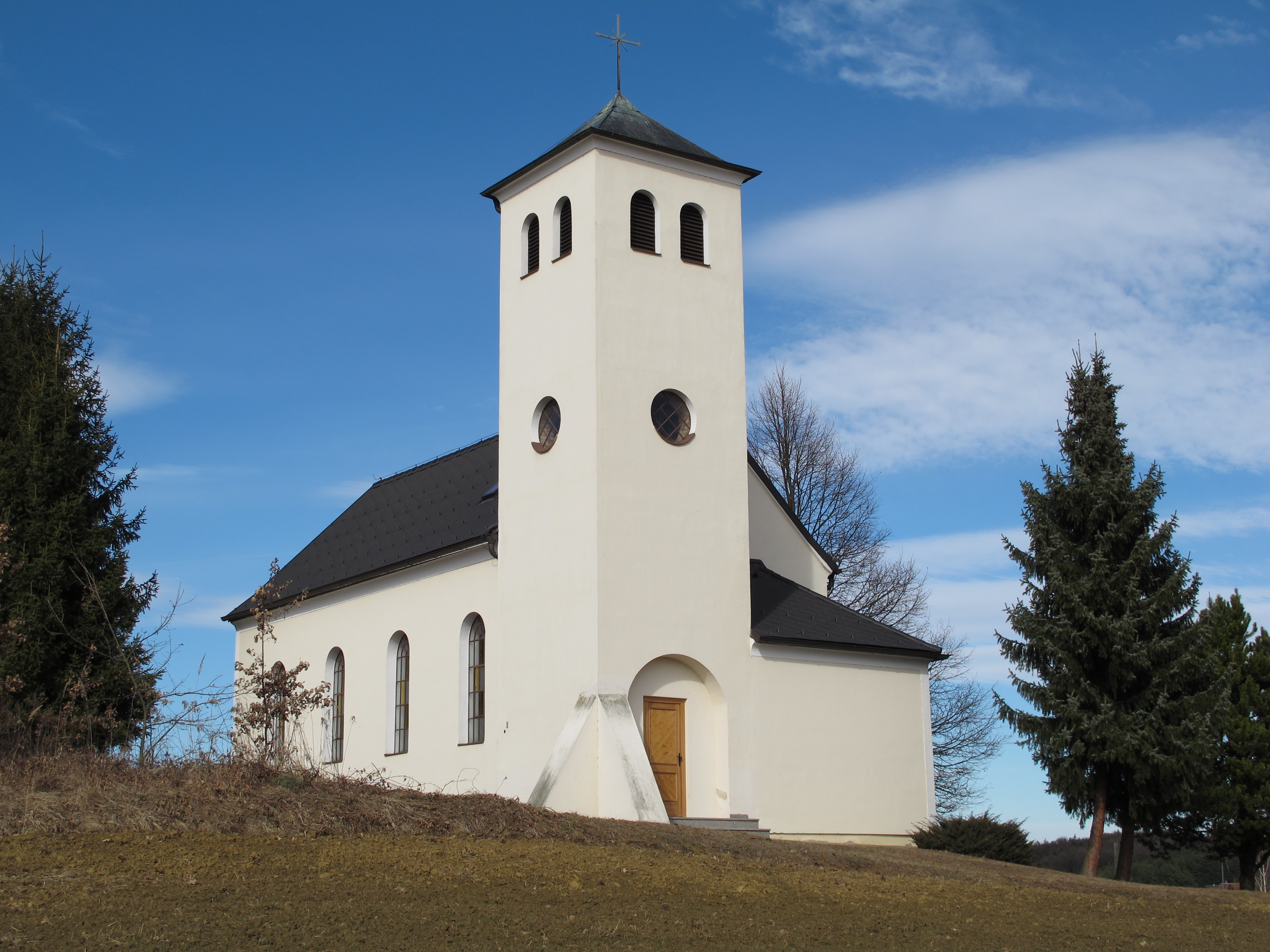
- Catholic church in Neustift

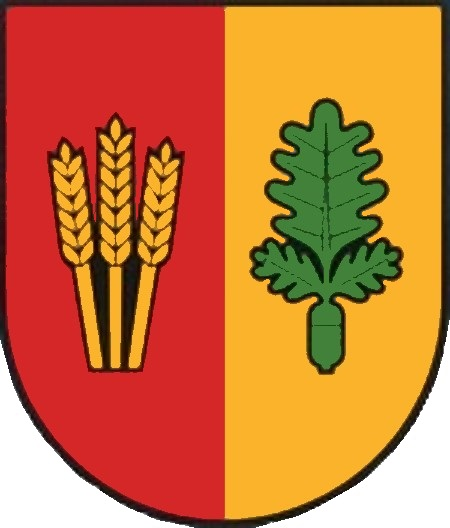
- Coat of arms

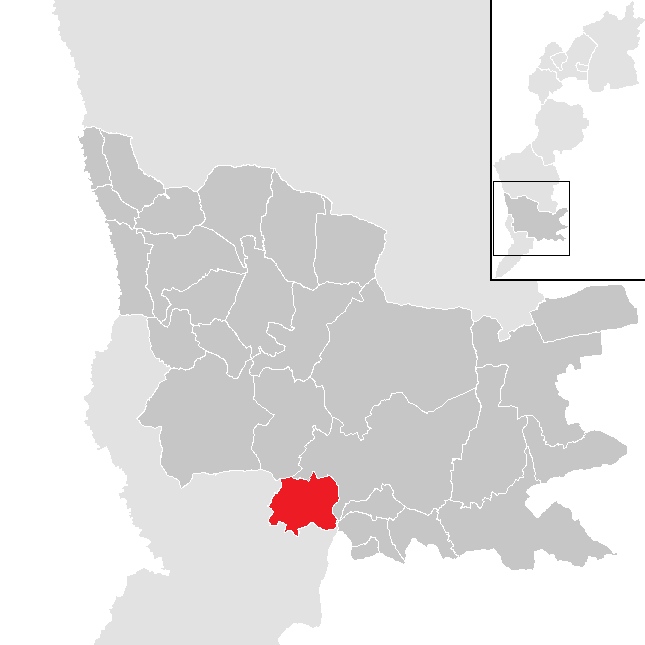
- Location within Güssing district

- Location within Austria
- Coordinates: 47°1′N 16°15′E
- Country: Austria
- State: Burgenland
- District: Güssing

Government
  - Mayor: Franz Kazinota (SPÖ)

Area
  - Total: 11.44 km^{2} (4.42 sq mi)

Population (2018-01-01)
  - Total: 474
  - Density: 41.4/km^{2} (107/sq mi)
- Time zone: UTC+1 (CET)
  - Summer (DST): UTC+2 (CEST)
- Postal code: 7540

Neustift bei Güssing (Hungarian: Újtelep) is a town in the district of Güssing in the Austrian state of Burgenland.

== Population ==
Historical population
Year	Pop.	±%
1869	908	—
1880	1,006	+10.8%
1890	1,163	+15.6%
1900	1,020	−12.3%
1910	931	−8.7%
1923	762	−18.2%
1934	822	+7.9%
1939	765	−6.9%
1951	802	+4.8%
1961	713	−11.1%
1971	735	+3.1%
1981	674	−8.3%
1991	614	−8.9%
2001	566	−7.8%
2011	520	−8.1%
2021	446	−14.2%
