= Neuhaus in der Wart =

Coordinates: 47.217°N 16.263°E

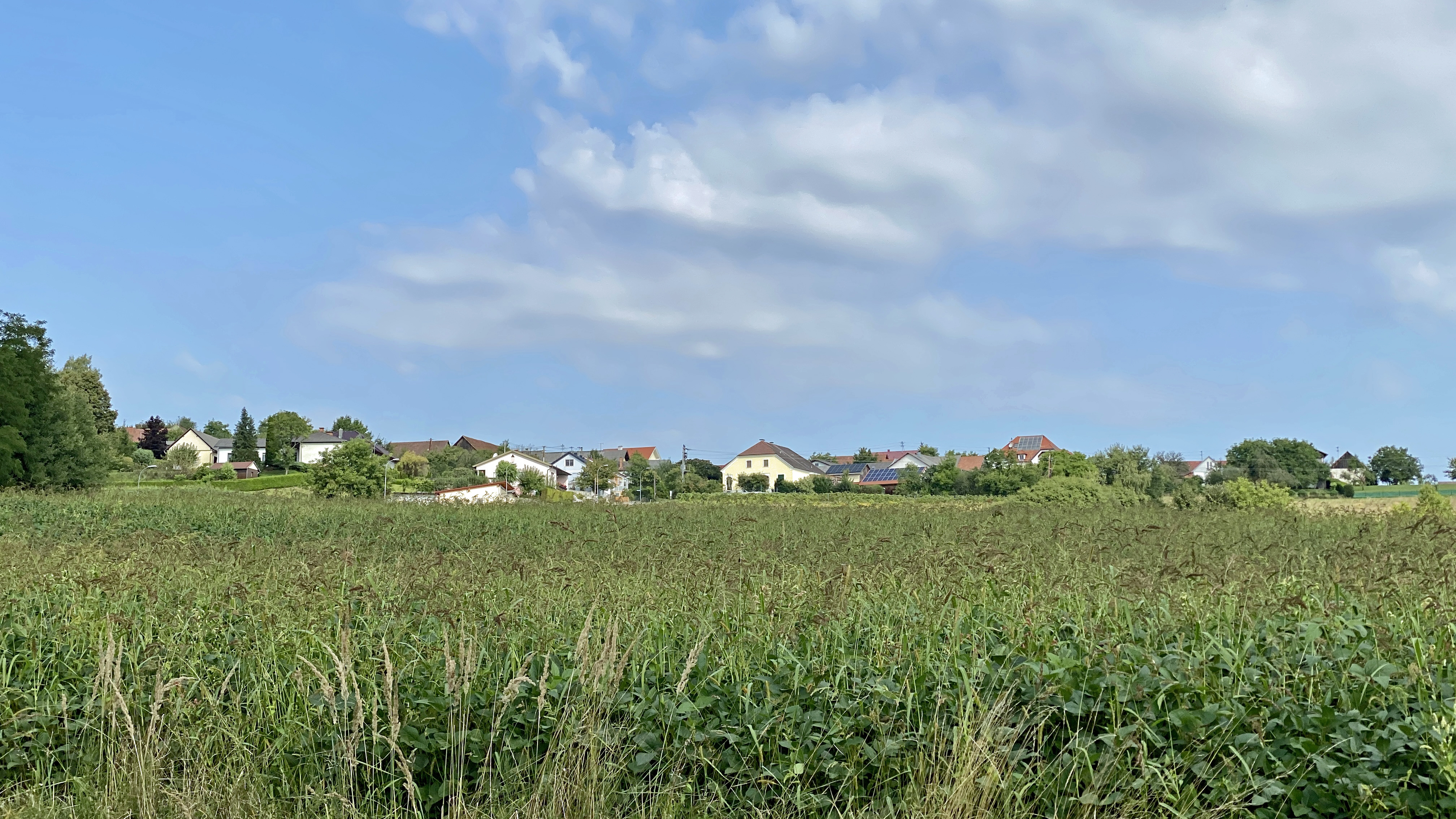
Panoramic view of Neuhaus in der Wart

Neuhaus in der Wart (formerly Krobotdorf or Kroatdorf, Croatian: Dobra, Hungarian: Őridobra ) is a Katastralgemeinde of the municipality Mischendorf in southern Burgenland, Austria. It is part of the district Oberwart.

== Data ==
- Population: 243 (2001)
- Altitude: 265 m above sea level.
- Postal Code: 7503
- Vehicle Registration: OW

Neuhaus in der Wart was founded as a Croatian village in the sixteenth century, the time the first settlers arrived. According to tradition, the settlers came from a farmstead between Kirchfidisch and Deutsch Schützen-Eisenberg. The original name was Dobrava from which the Hungarian names Dobra and Őridobra were derived. The German name Neuhaus came from the subsequent German settlers. According to an 1852 document, the school was made of wood, it was rebuilt in 1870.

After the canonical visitation in 1760, a chapel and a nearby bell tower were built in 1836, dedicated to St. Anthony. Mayor Ferdinand Obojkovics ordered a new church built in the mid-1900s. In the course of a local government reform, the former communities Mischendorf, Kotezicken, Kleinbachselten, Großbachselten, Rohrbach an der Teich and Neuhaus were merged to the present municipality of Mischendorf.

Views of Neuhaus in der Wart

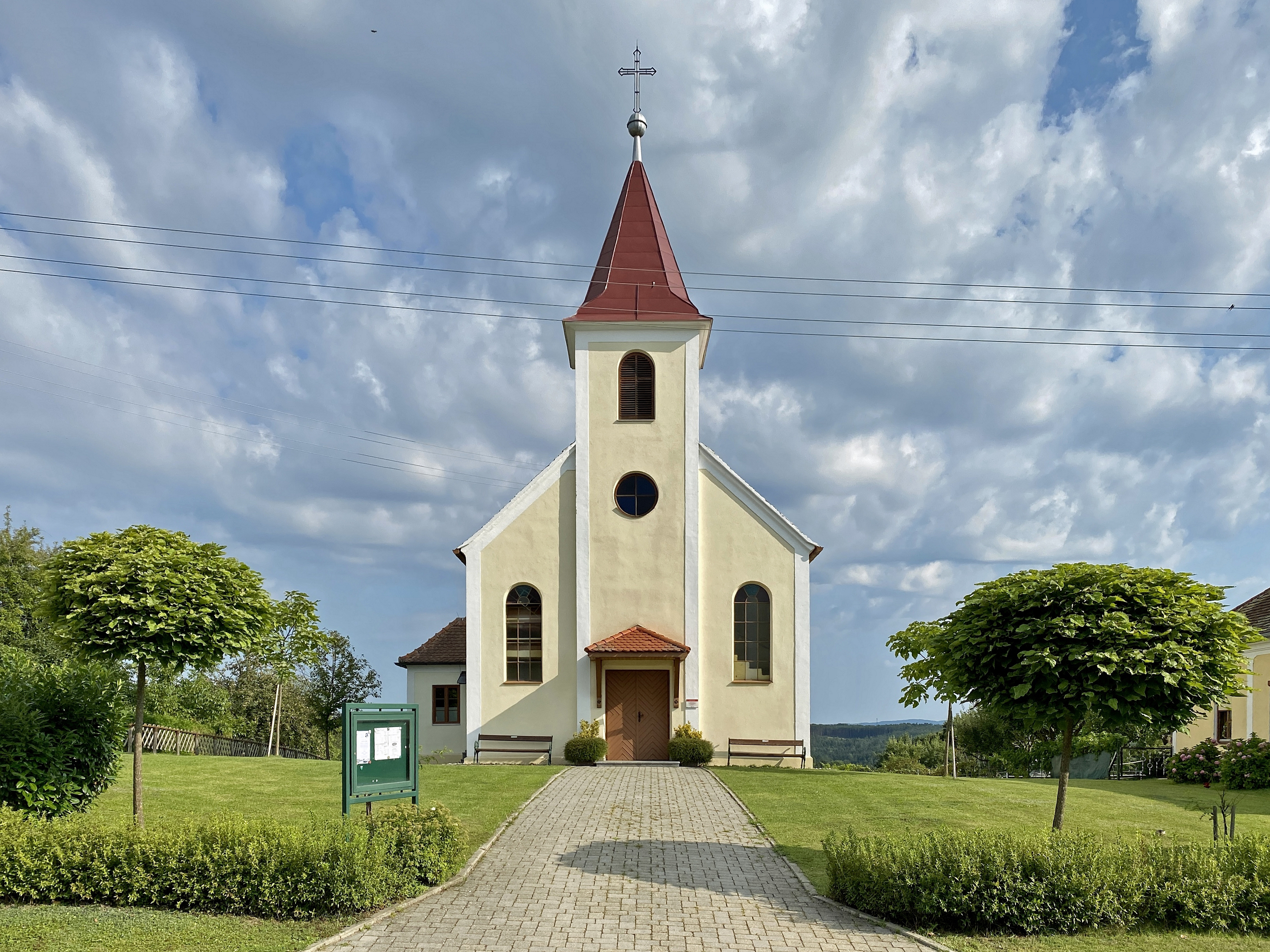
Catholic church

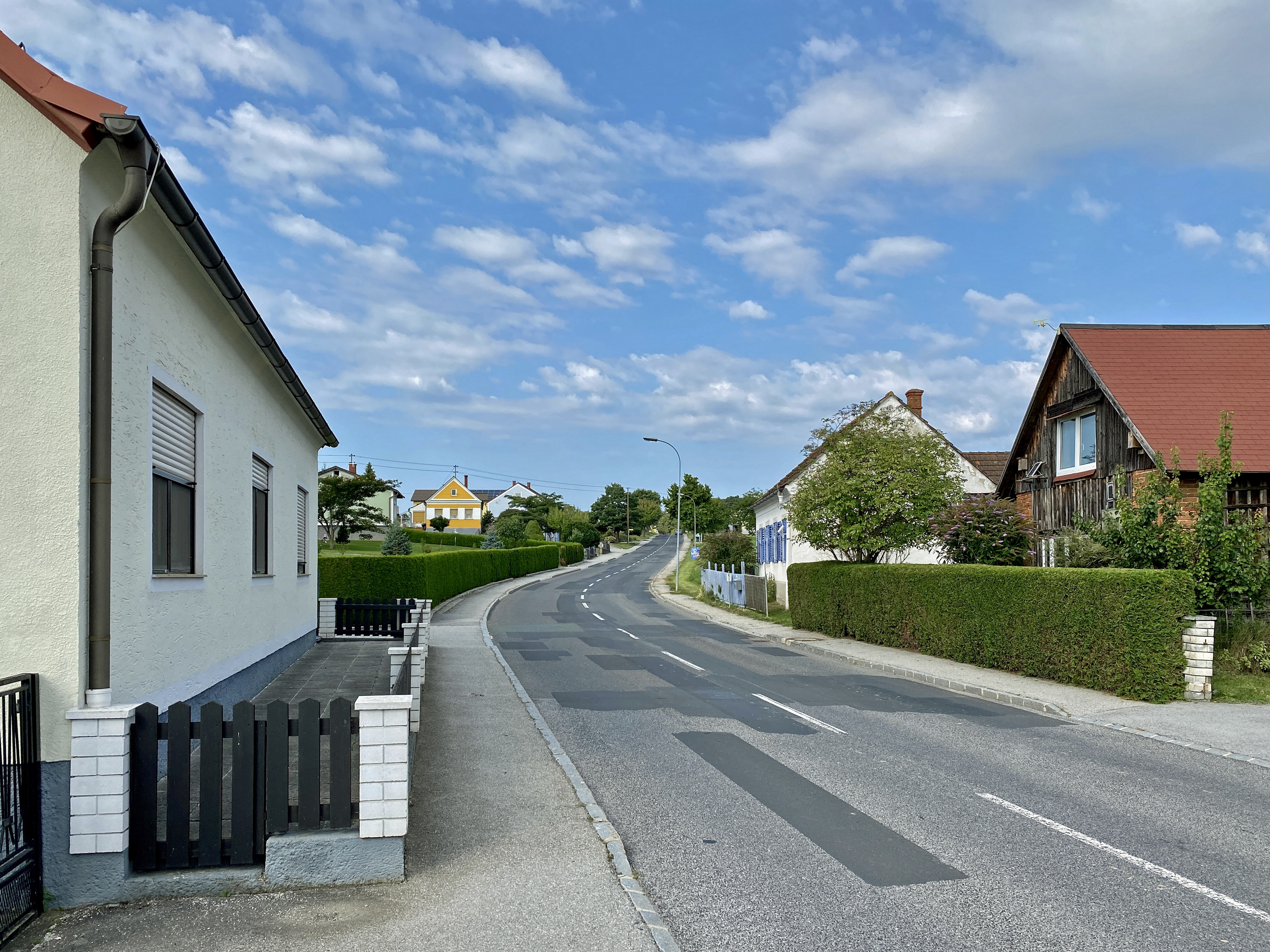
Main street

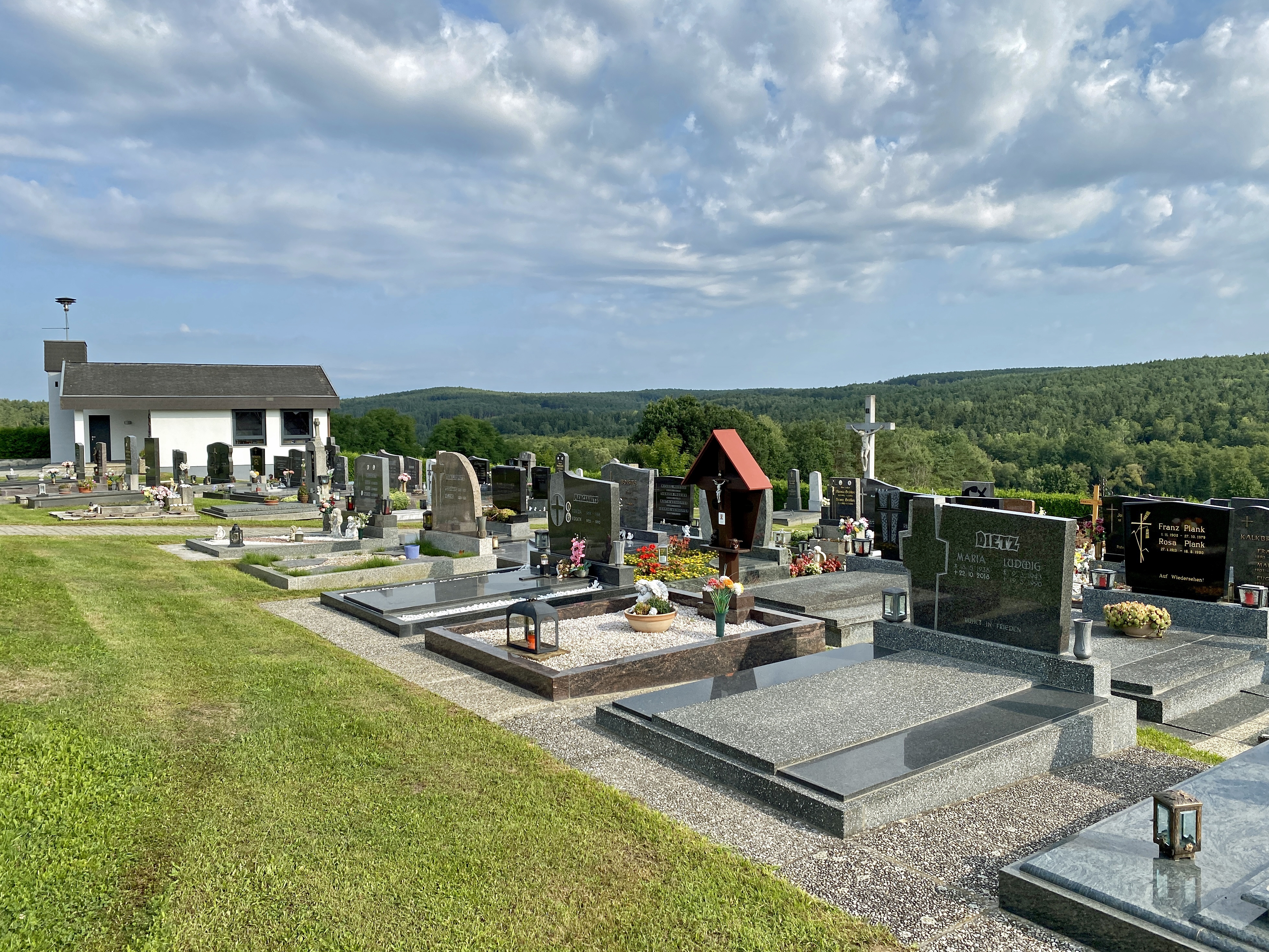
Cemetery

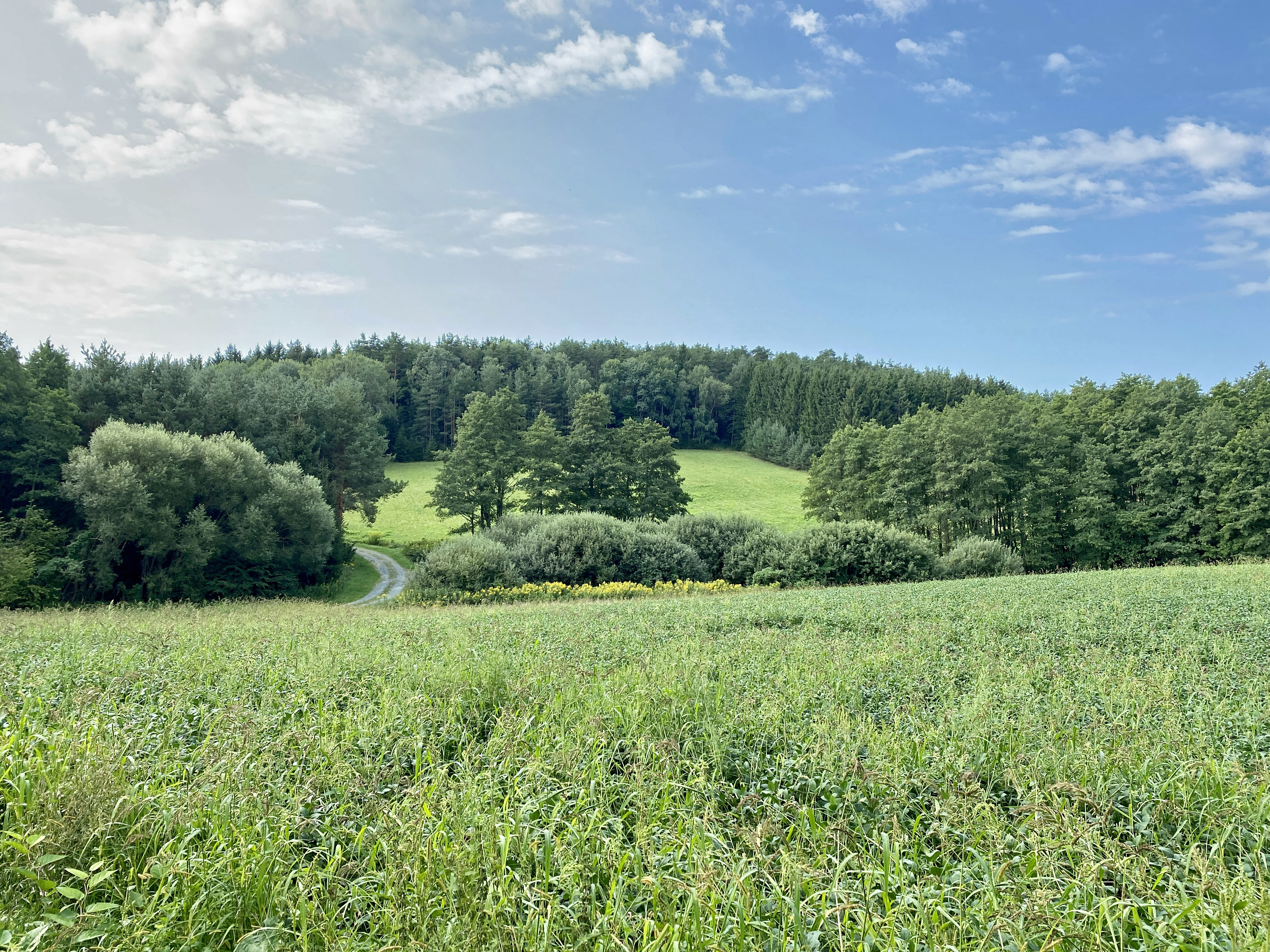
Meadows and forest
