= Neustift =

Neustift may refer to the following places in Austria:

- Neustift im Stubaital, in Tyrol
- Maria Neustift, in Upper Austria
- Neustift im Mühlkreis, in Upper Austria
- Neustift an der Lafnitz, in Burgenland
- Neustift bei Güssing, in Burgenland
- Neustift-Innermanzing, in Lower Austria

== See also ==
- Stift (disambiguation)
