= Rétfalu =

Rétfalu may refer to:

- Rétfalu: Wiesen, Austria (in Hungarian)
- Rétfalu: Retfala, Croatia (in Hungarian)
- Újrétfalu: Wiesfleck, Austria (in Hungarian)
