= Markt Neuhodis =

- Municipality
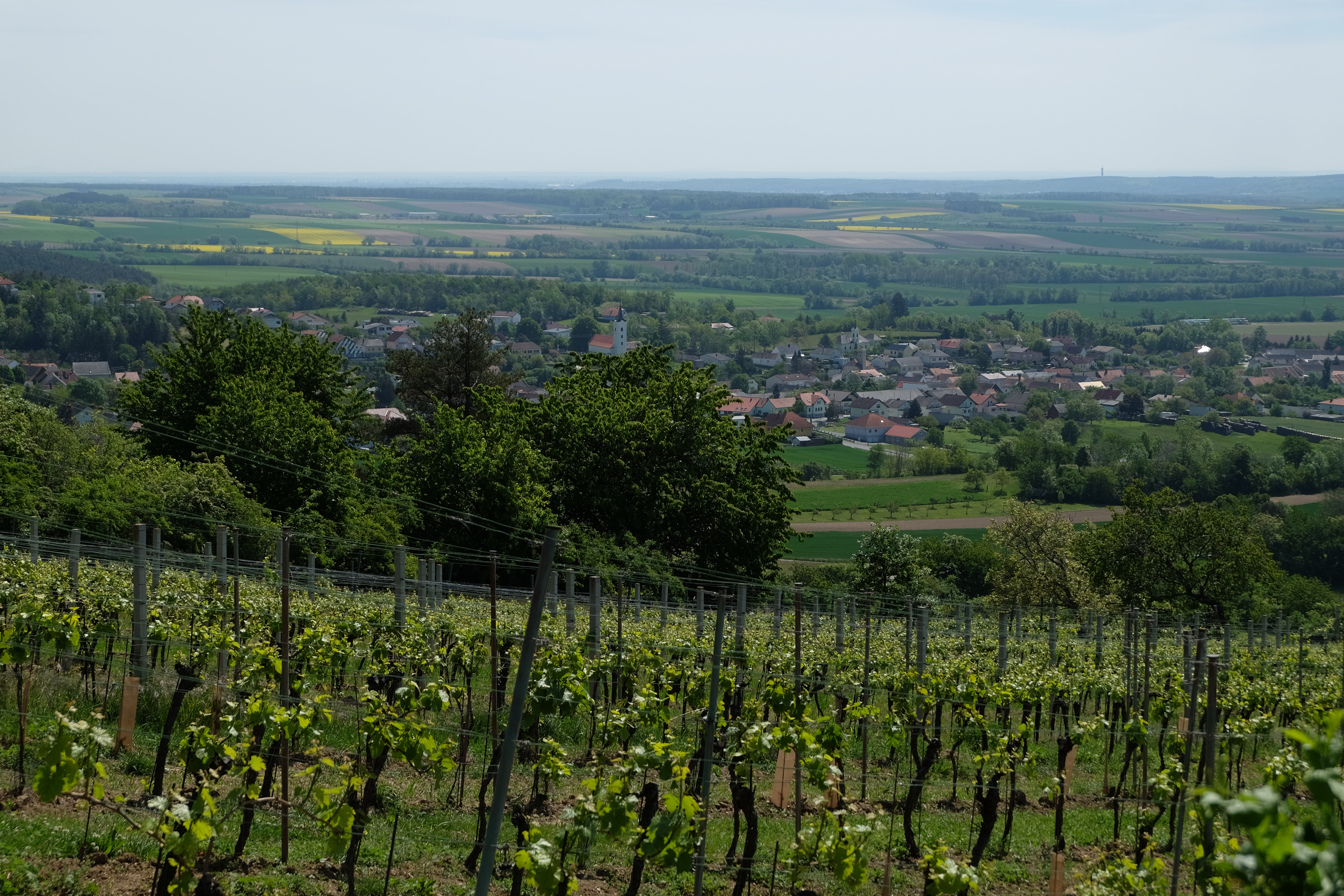

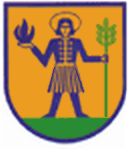
- Coat of arms

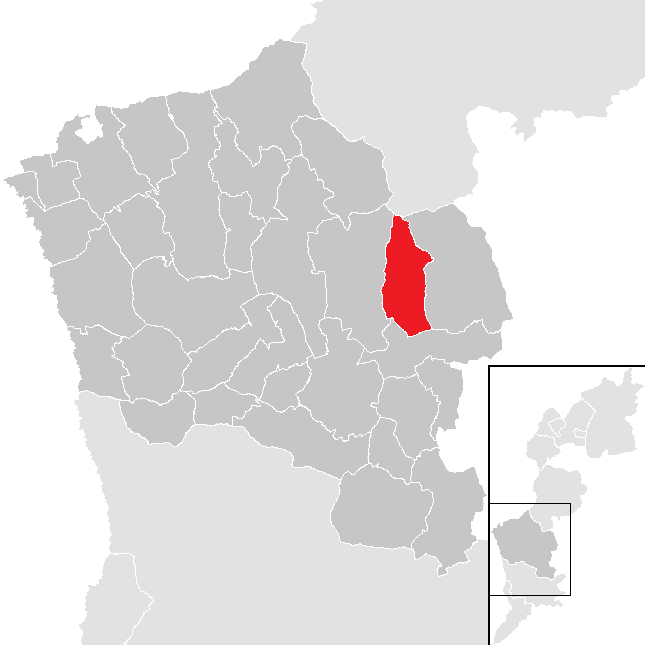
- Location within Oberwart district

- Location within Austria
- Coordinates: 47°18′N 16°24′E
- Country: Austria
- State: Burgenland
- District: Oberwart

Government
  - Mayor: Johann Wallner

Area
  - Total: 19.95 km^{2} (7.70 sq mi)
- Elevation: 326 m (1,070 ft)

Population (2018-01-01)
  - Total: 658
  - Density: 33.0/km^{2} (85.4/sq mi)
- Time zone: UTC+1 (CET)
  - Summer (DST): UTC+2 (CEST)
- Postal code: 7464

Markt Neuhodis is a town in the district of Oberwart in the Austrian state of Burgenland.

== Population ==
Historical population
Year	Pop.	±%
1869	1,039	—
1880	1,206	+16.1%
1890	1,283	+6.4%
1900	1,349	+5.1%
1910	1,298	−3.8%
1923	1,239	−4.5%
1934	1,242	+0.2%
1939	1,124	−9.5%
1951	986	−12.3%
1961	939	−4.8%
1971	962	+2.4%
1981	891	−7.4%
1991	856	−3.9%
2001	739	−13.7%
2011	675	−8.7%
