= Deutsch Schützen massacre =

1945 mass killing in Deutsch Schützen-Eisenberg, Austria

Coordinates: 47.17°N 16.43°E

The Deutsch Schützen massacre was a 1945 mass killing of at least 57 Hungarian Jewish forced laborers by the Waffen-SS in Deutsch Schützen-Eisenberg in Austria. The Hitler Youth-Bannführer Alfred Weber, who was responsible for construction in Deutsch Schützen, gave the order for the massacre. At the old church, Martinskirche, in the farmland on the west side of Deutsch Schützen, a plaque was erected on the exterior of the building memorializing those murdered in the massacre.

== Historical Background ==
The village Deutsch Schützen-Eisenberg had become a part of the Styrian Gau after the Anschluss because Southern Burgenland was annexed to it. The rest of the Bundesland became a part of the Reichsgau Niederdonau.

On September 1, 1944, the Reich Defense Commissioner was instructed by Adolf Hitler's directives to plan and build fortification along the Reich's borders. In the Styrian region, the defensive line known in German propaganda as the South-east wall was to be built for this purpose. Gauleiter Siegfried Uiberreither was responsible for its construction.

== Incident and aftermath ==
The incident occurred on 29 March 1945.

The victims' remains were found in 1995 by the Israelitische Kultusgemeinde Wien. In 2008, Viennese political science student Andreas Forster discovered the name of Adolf Storms in records of the incident. Forster's professor Walter Manoschek gathered evidence and conducted a videotaped interview with Storms. In 2009, then 90-year-old Storms was indicted for his alleged involvement in the killings.

Storms died on June 28, 2010, at the age of 90.

== See also ==
- Rechnitz
