= Kemeten =

- Municipality
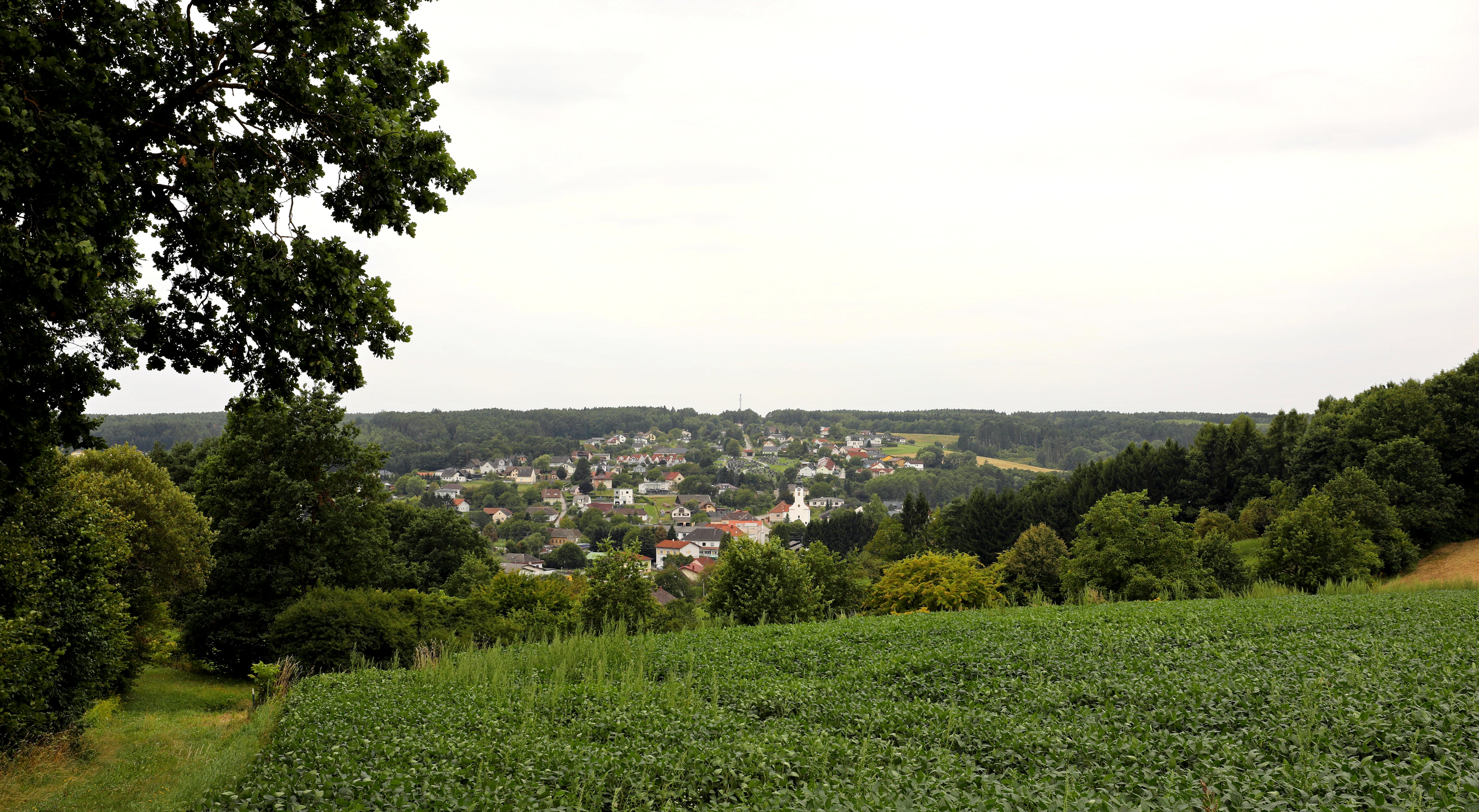
- Kemeten parish church

- Coat of arms

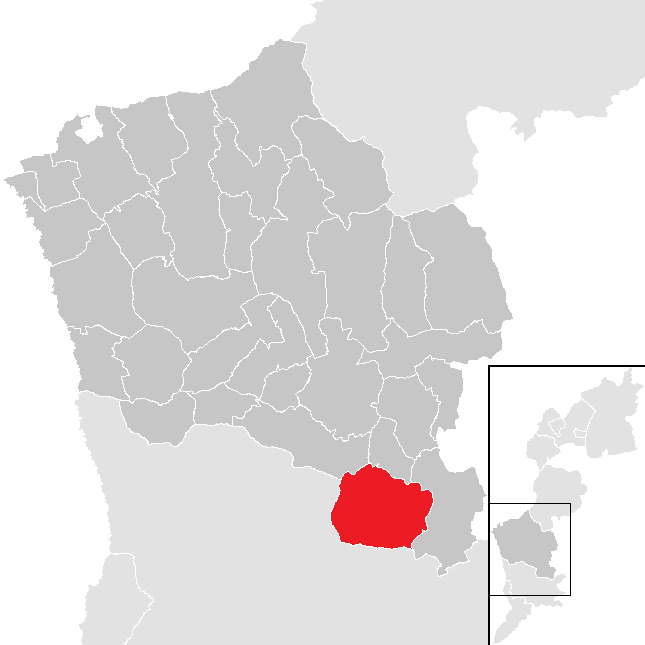
- Location within Oberwart district

- Location within Austria
- Coordinates: 47°15′N 16°9′E
- Country: Austria
- State: Burgenland
- District: Oberwart

Government
  - Mayor: Wolfgang Koller

Area
  - Total: 20.67 km^{2} (7.98 sq mi)

Population (2018-01-01)
  - Total: 1,493
  - Density: 72.23/km^{2} (187.1/sq mi)
- Time zone: UTC+1 (CET)
  - Summer (DST): UTC+2 (CEST)
- Postal code: 7531

Kemeten (German pronunciation: [ˈkɛmətn̩]) is a town in the district of Oberwart in the Austrian state of Burgenland.

== Population ==
Historical population
Year	Pop.	±%
1869	1,178	—
1880	1,224	+3.9%
1890	1,372	+12.1%
1900	1,464	+6.7%
1910	1,567	+7.0%
1923	1,549	−1.1%
1934	1,821	+17.6%
1939	1,588	−12.8%
1951	1,557	−2.0%
1961	1,580	+1.5%
1971	1,587	+0.4%
1981	1,544	−2.7%
1991	1,522	−1.4%
2001	1,529	+0.5%
2011	1,511	−1.2%
