= Oberwart District =

Coordinates: 47.294°N 16.243°E

Oberwart District Bezirk Oberwart
- District
- Country: Austria
- State: Burgenland
- Number of municipalities: 27
- Administrative seat: Oberwart

Government
  - District Governor: Peter Bubik

Area
  - Total: 743.4 km^{2} (287.0 sq mi)

Population (2022)
  - Total: 54,353
  - Density: 73.11/km^{2} (189.4/sq mi)
- Time zone: UTC+01:00 (CET)
  - Summer (DST): UTC+02:00 (CEST)
- Vehicle registration: OW
- NUTS code: AT113

Bezirk Oberwart (Croatian: Kotar Borta; Hungarian: Felsőőr Járás) is a district in the state of Burgenland in Austria. The population of the district, as of 2022, is 54,353. The largest settlements in the district are Oberwart, Pinkafeld and Großpetersdorf.

== Municipalities ==
| Municipality (Alternative name) | Location | Area (km^{2}) | Population (2022) | Population Density (per km^{2}) | Image | Cadastral communities |
|---|---|---|---|---|---|---|
| Bad Tatzmannsdorf | | 11.62 | 1,628 | 140 | | Jormannsdorf, Sulzriegel |
| Badersdorf | | 8.64 | 279 | 32 | | |
| Bernstein im Burgenland | | 38.99 | 2,079 | 53 | | Dreihütten, Redlschlag, Rettenbach, Stuben |
| Deutsch Schützen-Eisenberg | | 28.43 | 1,079 | 38 | | Deutsch-Schützen, Edlitz im Burgenland, Eisenberg an der Pinka, Höll, Sankt Kathrein im Burgenland |
| Grafenschachen | | 9.94 | 1,243 | 125 | | Kroisegg |
| Großpetersdorf | | 31.36 | 3,560 | 114 | | |
| Hannersdorf | | 17.11 | 741 | 43 | | |
| Jabing | | 7.78 | 752 | 97 | | |
| Kemeten | | 20.67 | 1,512 | 73 | | |
| Kohfidisch | | 31.34 | 1,467 | 47 | | Harmisch, Kirchfidisch |
| Litzelsdorf | | 13.88 | 1,151 | 83 | | |
| Loipersdorf-Kitzladen | | 15.88 | 1,339 | 84 | | Kitzladen, Loipersdorf im Burgenland |
| Mariasdorf | | 20.54 | 1,144 | 56 | | Bergwerk, Grodnau, Neustift bei Schlaining, Tauchen |
| Markt Allhau | | 32.31 | 1,910 | 59 | | Buchschachen |
| Markt Neuhodis (Novi Hodas) | | 19.95 | 662 | 33 | | Althodis |
| Mischendorf | | 26.18 | 1,492 | 57 | | Großbachselten, Kleinbachselten, Kotezicken, Neuhaus in der Wart, Rohrbach an der Teich |
| Neustift an der Lafnitz | | 3.50 | 792 | 226 | | |
| Oberdorf im Burgenland | | 9.24 | 997 | 108 | | |
| Oberschützen | | 44.39 | 2,457 | 55 | | Aschau im Burgenland, Schmiedrait, Unterschützen, Willersdorf |
| Oberwart (Felsőőr) | | 36.49 | 7,723 | 212 | | Sankt Martin in der Wart |
| Pinkafeld | | 27.43 | 5,915 | 216 | | Alt-Pinkafeld, Gfangen, Hochart, Nord-Pinkafeld, Pinkafeld Stadt |
| Rechnitz | | 43.77 | 2,987 | 68 | | |
| Riedlingsdorf | | 16.13 | 1,639 | 102 | | |
| Rotenturm an der Pinka | | 17.04 | 1,447 | 85 | | Siget in der Wart (Őrisziget), Spitzzicken |
| Schachendorf (Čajta) | | 22.32 | 758 | 34 | | |
| Schandorf (Čemba) | | 11.26 | 268 | 24 | | |
| Stadtschlaining | | 42.07 | 1,980 | 47 | | Altschlaining, Drumling, Goberling, Neumarkt im Tauchental |
| Unterkohlstätten | | 29.14 | 972 | 33 | | Glashütten bei Schlaining, Günseck, Holzschlag, Oberkohlstätten |
| Unterwart (Alsóőr) | | 20.22 | 967 | 48 | | Eisenzicken |
| Weiden bei Rechnitz (Bandol) | | 39.84 | 809 | 20 | | Allersdorf im Burgenland, Allersgraben, Mönchmeierhof, Oberpodgoria, Podler, Rauhriegel, Rumpersdorf, Unterpodgoria, Zuberbach |
| Wiesfleck | | 20.08 | 1,154 | 57 | | Schönherrn, Schreibersdorf, Weinberg im Burgenland |
| Wolfau | | 15.02 | 1,450 | 97 | | |
