= Jabing =

- Municipality
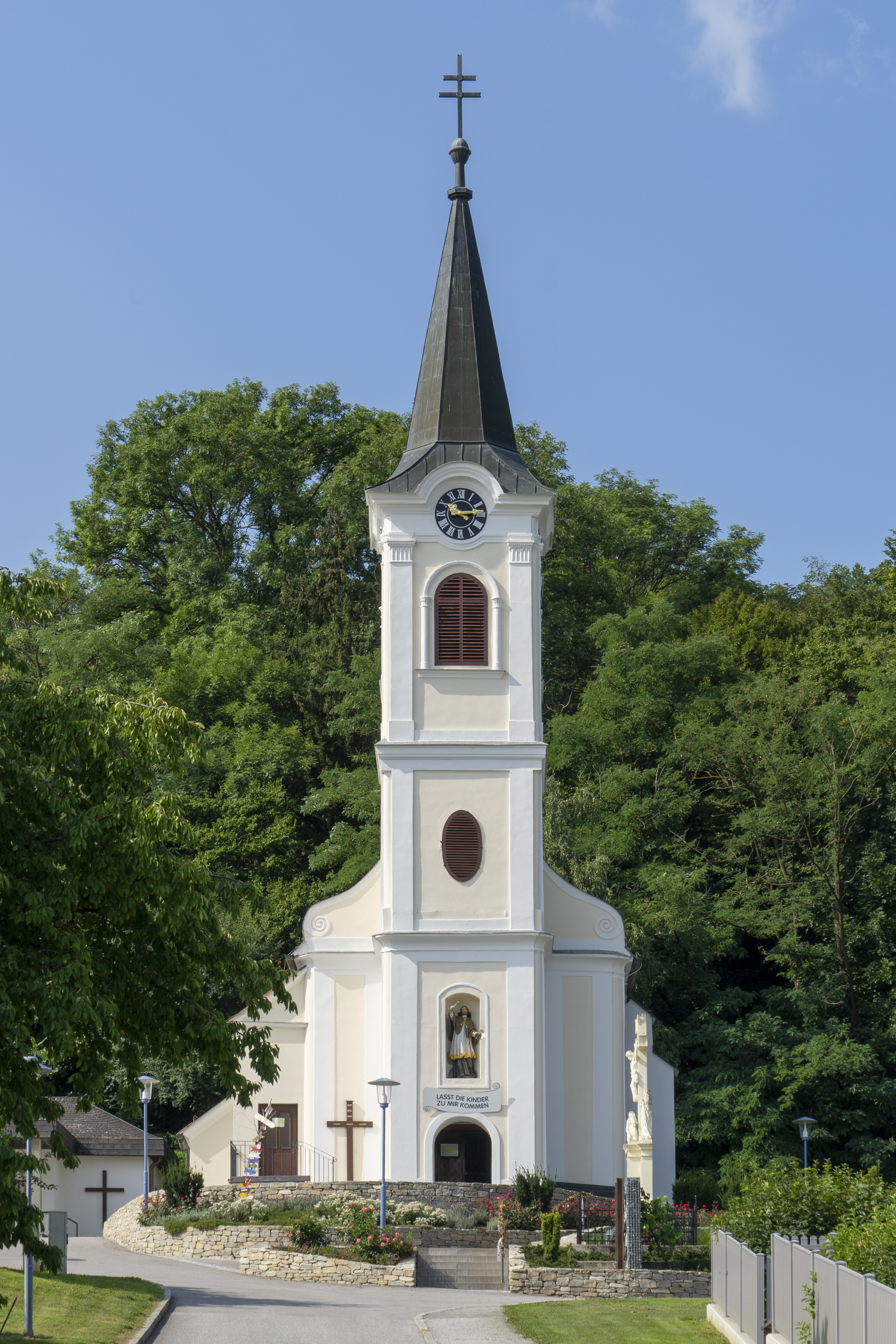
- Jabing parish church

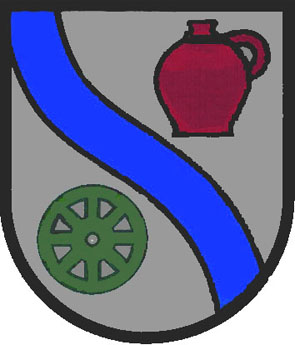
- Coat of arms

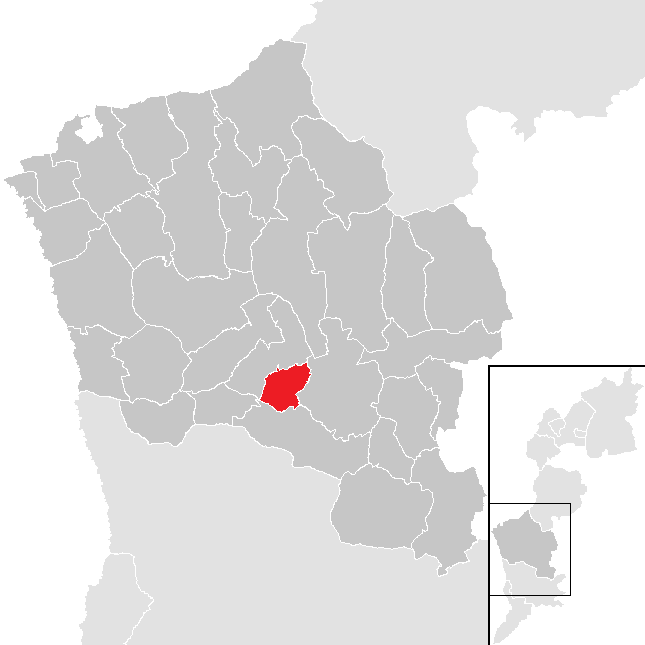
- Location within Oberwart district

- Location within Austria
- Coordinates: 47°14′N 16°16′E
- Country: Austria
- State: Burgenland
- District: Oberwart

Government
  - Mayor: Günter Valika (SPÖ)

Area
  - Total: 7.78 km^{2} (3.00 sq mi)

Population (2018-01-01)
  - Total: 734
  - Density: 94.3/km^{2} (244/sq mi)
- Time zone: UTC+1 (CET)
  - Summer (DST): UTC+2 (CEST)
- Postal code: 7503

Jabing (Hungarian: Vasjobbágyi) is a town in the district of Oberwart in the Austrian state of Burgenland.

== Population ==
Historical population
Year	Pop.	±%
1869	1,196	—
1880	1,254	+4.8%
1890	1,346	+7.3%
1900	1,387	+3.0%
1910	1,280	−7.7%
1923	1,090	−14.8%
1934	1,010	−7.3%
1939	930	−7.9%
1951	864	−7.1%
1961	754	−12.7%
1971	816	+8.2%
1981	788	−3.4%
1991	787	−0.1%
2001	742	−5.7%
2011	756	+1.9%
