= Schandorf =

Schandorf Čemba
- Municipality
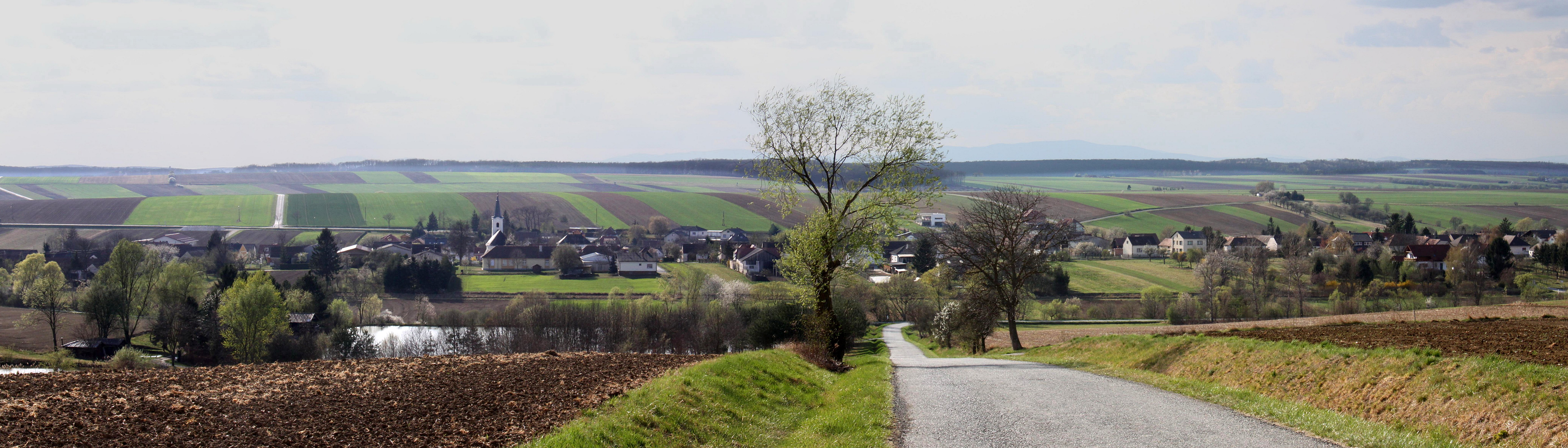
- Schandorf panoramic view

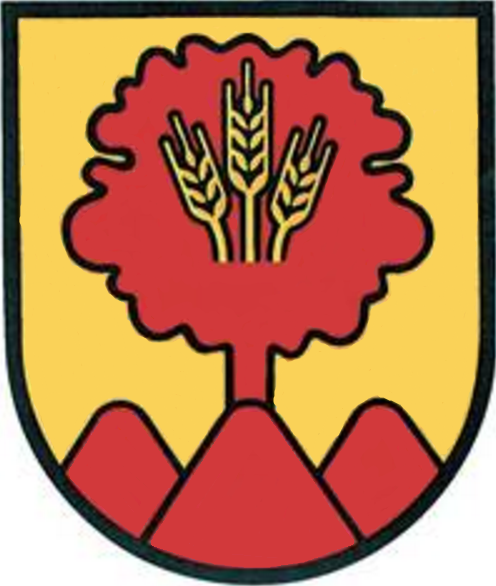
- Coat of arms

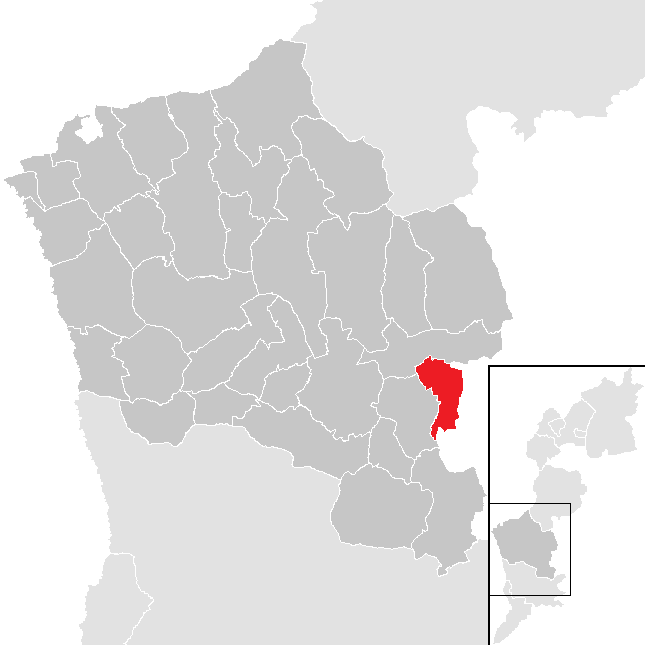
- Location within Oberwart district

- Location within Austria Location within Burgenland
- Coordinates: 47°15′N 16°25′E
- Country: Austria
- State: Burgenland
- District: Oberwart

Government
  - Mayor: Josef Csencsics

Area
  - Total: 11.26 km^{2} (4.35 sq mi)
- Elevation: 260 m (850 ft)

Population (2018-01-01)
  - Total: 276
  - Density: 24.5/km^{2} (63.5/sq mi)
- Time zone: UTC+1 (CET)
  - Summer (DST): UTC+2 (CEST)
- Postal code: 7472
- Website: www.schandorf.at

Schandorf (Croatian: Čemba, Hungarian: Csém) is a village in the district of Oberwart in Burgenland in southeastern Austria.

== History ==
The earliest record of the village's existence dates to 1244. In the first half of the 16th century, the region was devastated by attacking Turkish troops, and villages were depopulated. The Hungarian magnate Franz Batthyány arranged for Schandorf and other villages to be repopulated by immigrants from Croatia, and for centuries, the village was an island of Croatian language and culture, surrounded by speakers of Hungarian and German. A dialect of Croatian unique to the village gradually evolved, rich in loanword vocabulary from Hungarian. With ever-increasing outmigration and cosmopolitan influence of German, this dialect is today endangered.

For centuries the village was part of Hungary. Following the First World War, with the breakup of the old Austrian Empire, the division of the land between the new nation states of Austria and Hungary was accompanied by turmoil; for details, see "Burgenland". The final establishment of the boundary in 1921 had the unfortunate effect of separating Schandorf from nearby Croatian-speaking communities, which remained part of Hungary. The separation became extreme after the Second World War, when the Iron Curtain descended blocking almost all passage across the border. This would have been a particularly salient fact of life for residents of Schandorf, whose outskirts lie only about 400 metres (1,310 ft) from Hungarian territory.

Schandorf has not prospered in recent times; lack of economic opportunity has led to outmigration, particularly to the United States and Canada. Between 1900 and 2005 the population declined from 720 to 297. Municipal government was suspended in 1972, but restored in 1996.

== Population ==
Historical population
Year	Pop.	±%
1869	641	—
1880	697	+8.7%
1890	670	−3.9%
1900	724	+8.1%
1910	719	−0.7%
1923	638	−11.3%
1934	624	−2.2%
1939	562	−9.9%
1951	536	−4.6%
1961	448	−16.4%
1971	409	−8.7%
1981	392	−4.2%
1991	342	−12.8%
2001	310	−9.4%
2011	299	−3.5%

== Culture ==
Schandorf is the home of a tamburrizza orchestra, a reflection of its Croatian ethnic heritage. (The tamburizza is a traditional folk instrument, widely played in Croatia.) The orchestra performs frequently, often outside the village.
