= Badersdorf =

- Municipality
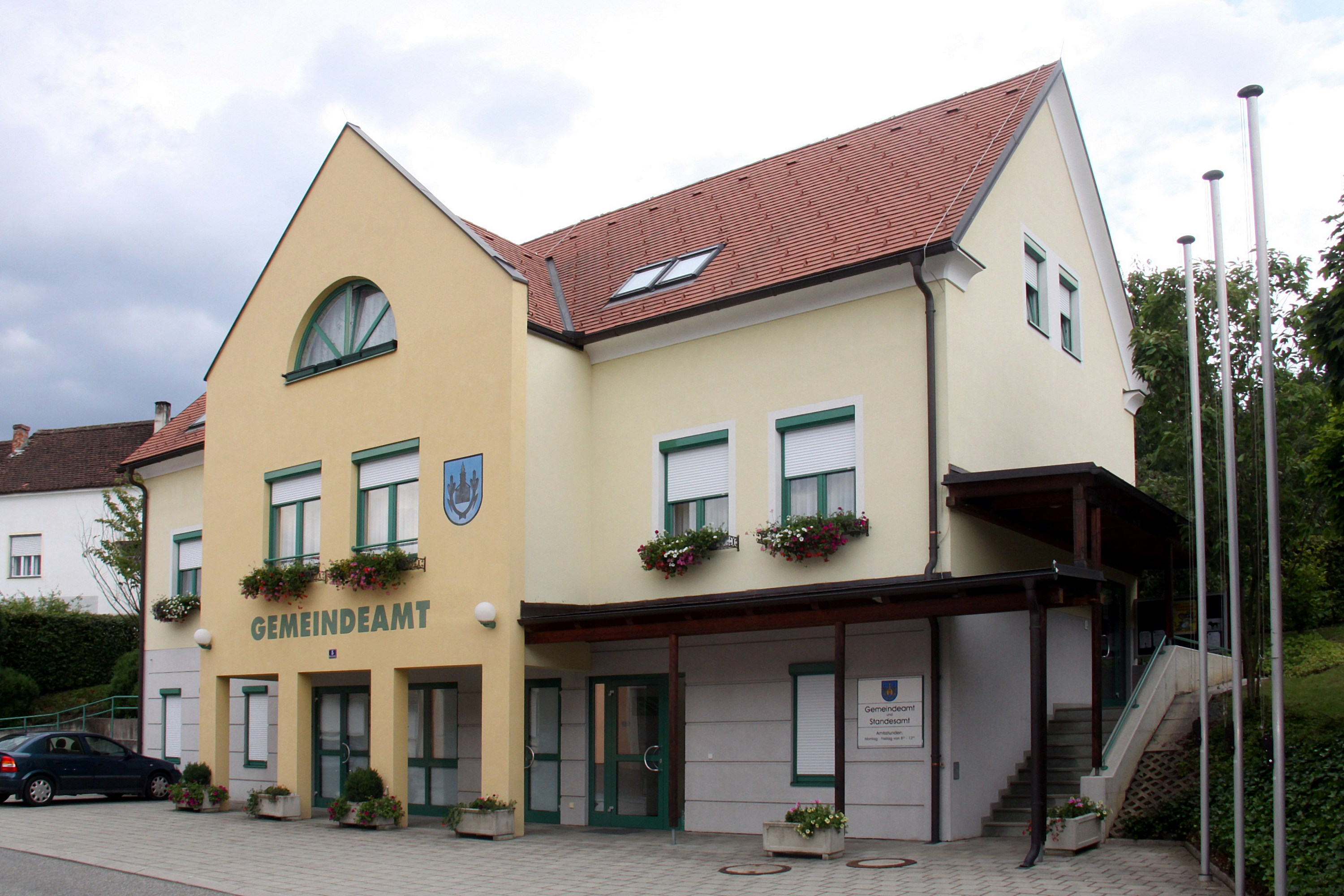
- Municipal office

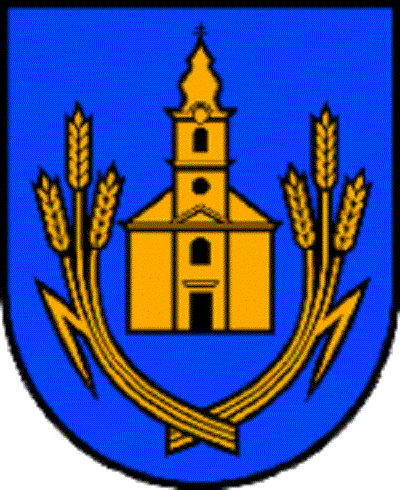
- Coat of arms

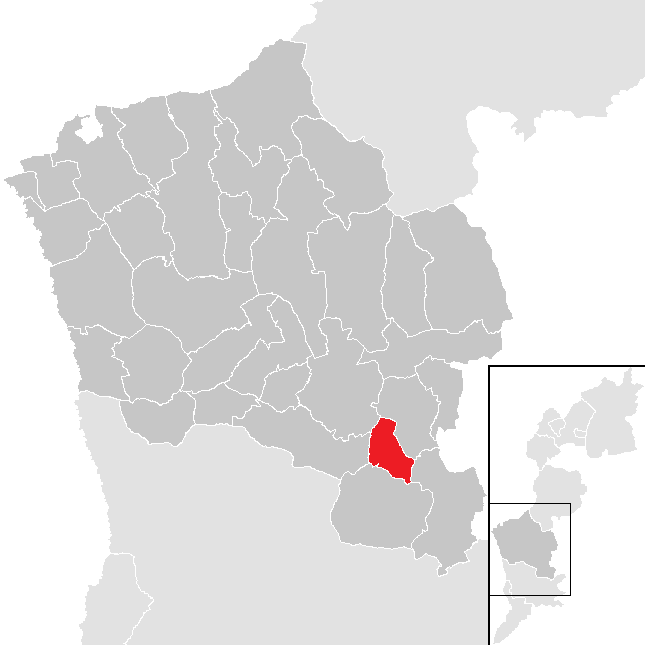
- Location within Oberwart district

- Location within Austria
- Coordinates: 47°12′N 16°22′E
- Country: Austria
- State: Burgenland
- District: Oberwart

Government
  - Mayor: Daniel Ziniel (ÖVP)

Area
  - Total: 8.64 km^{2} (3.34 sq mi)
- Elevation: 268 m (879 ft)

Population (2018-01-01)
  - Total: 287
  - Density: 33.2/km^{2} (86.0/sq mi)
- Time zone: UTC+1 (CET)
  - Summer (DST): UTC+2 (CEST)
- Postal code: 7512
- Website: www.badersdorf.at

Badersdorf (Hungarian: Pöszöny, Croatian: Pesem) is a municipality in Burgenland in the district of Oberwart in Austria.

== Population ==
Historical population
Year	Pop.	±%
1869	463	—
1880	443	−4.3%
1890	476	+7.4%
1900	499	+4.8%
1910	485	−2.8%
1923	447	−7.8%
1934	434	−2.9%
1939	436	+0.5%
1951	395	−9.4%
1961	363	−8.1%
1971	342	−5.8%
1981	323	−5.6%
1991	331	+2.5%
2001	325	−1.8%
2011	298	−8.3%

== Politics ==
Of the 11 positions on the municipal council, the ÖVP has 7, and the SPÖ 4.
