= Oberdorf im Burgenland =

- Municipality
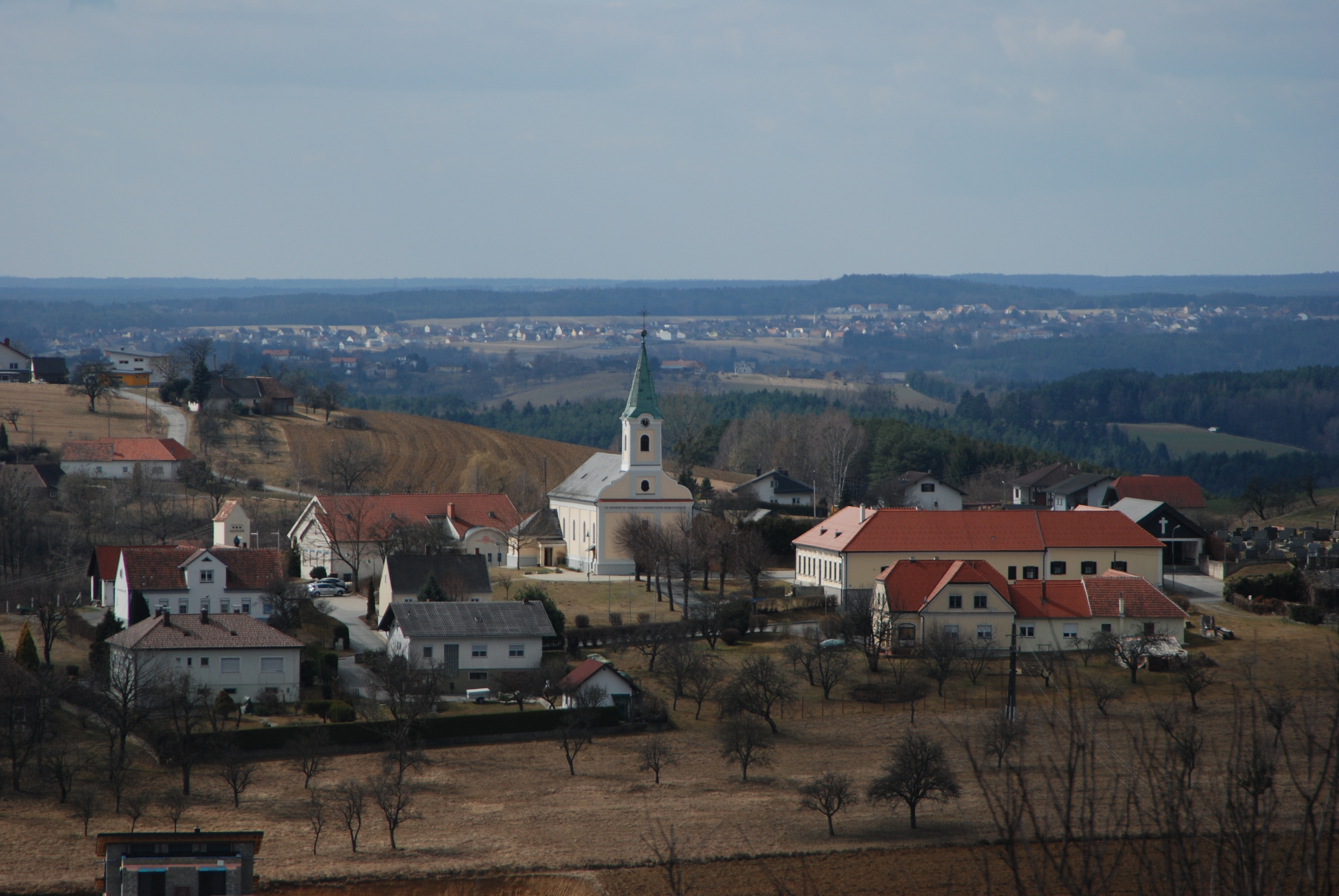
- View of Oberdorf

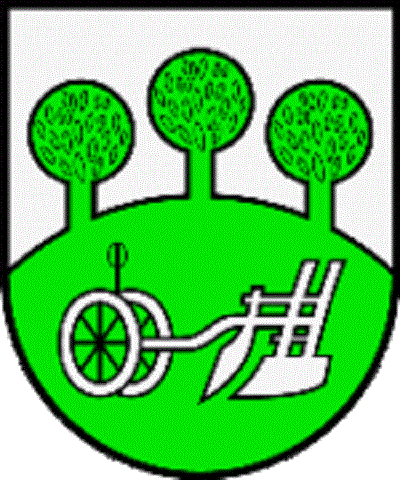
- Coat of arms

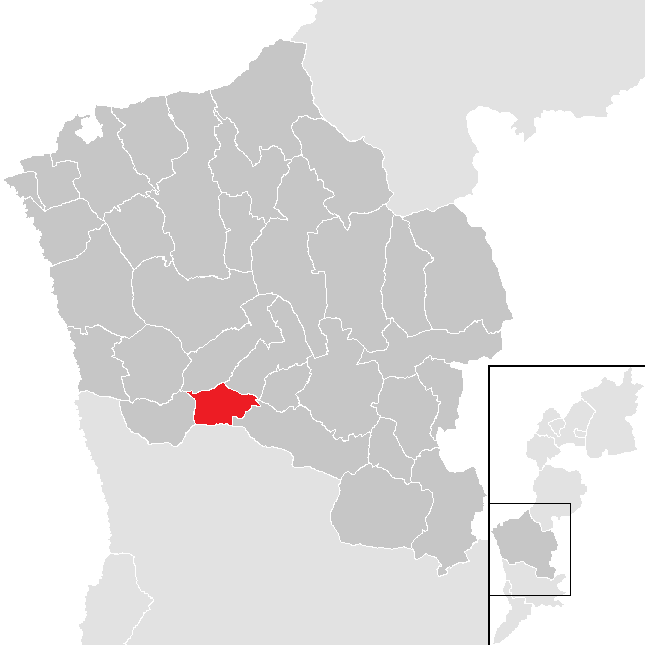
- Location within Oberwart district

- Location within Austria
- Coordinates: 47°13′N 16°13′E
- Country: Austria
- State: Burgenland
- District: Oberwart

Government
  - Mayor: Karl Halper

Area
  - Total: 9.24 km^{2} (3.57 sq mi)
- Elevation: 364 m (1,194 ft)

Population (2018-01-01)
  - Total: 996
  - Density: 108/km^{2} (279/sq mi)
- Time zone: UTC+1 (CET)
  - Summer (DST): UTC+2 (CEST)
- Postal code: 7501

Oberdorf im Burgenland (Hungarian: Őrállás) is a town in the district of Oberwart in the Austrian state of Burgenland.

== Population ==
Historical population
| Year | Pop. | ±% |
|---|---|---|
| 1869 | 756 | — |
| 1880 | 831 | +9.9% |
| 1890 | 974 | +17.2% |
| 1900 | 1,071 | +10.0% |
| 1910 | 942 | −12.0% |
| 1923 | 993 | +5.4% |
| 1934 | 1,115 | +12.3% |
| 1939 | 1,110 | −0.4% |
| 1951 | 1,133 | +2.1% |
| 1961 | 1,136 | +0.3% |
| 1971 | 1,119 | −1.5% |
| 1981 | 1,083 | −3.2% |
| 1991 | 1,080 | −0.3% |
| 2001 | 1,102 | +2.0% |
| 2011 | 1,039 | −5.7% |
