= Hannersdorf =

- Municipality
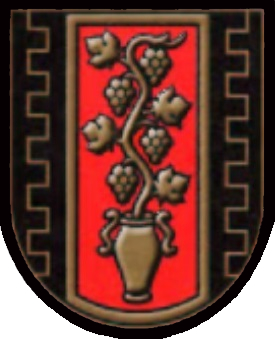
- Coat of arms

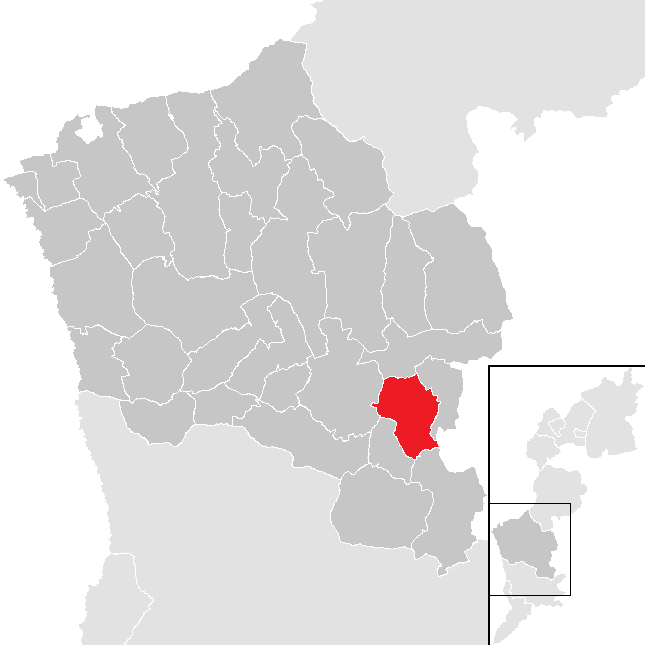
- Location within Oberwart district

- Location within Austria
- Coordinates: 47°14′N 16°23′E
- Country: Austria
- State: Burgenland
- District: Oberwart

Government
  - Mayor: Erich Werderits

Area
  - Total: 17.11 km^{2} (6.61 sq mi)
- Elevation: 268 m (879 ft)

Population (2018-01-01)
  - Total: 758
  - Density: 44.3/km^{2} (115/sq mi)
- Time zone: UTC+1 (CET)
  - Summer (DST): UTC+2 (CEST)
- Postal code: 7473
- Website: www.hannersdorf.at

Hannersdorf (Hungarian: Sámfalva) is a municipality in Burgenland in the district of Oberwart in Austria.

== Geography ==
Parts of the municipality are Hannersdorf, Burg, and Woppendorf.

== Population ==
Historical population
| Year | Pop. | ±% |
|---|---|---|
| 1869 | 1,487 | — |
| 1880 | 1,543 | +3.8% |
| 1890 | 1,671 | +8.3% |
| 1900 | 1,773 | +6.1% |
| 1910 | 1,573 | −11.3% |
| 1923 | 1,406 | −10.6% |
| 1934 | 1,346 | −4.3% |
| 1939 | 1,281 | −4.8% |
| 1951 | 1,275 | −0.5% |
| 1961 | 1,175 | −7.8% |
| 1971 | 1,042 | −11.3% |
| 1981 | 1,002 | −3.8% |
| 1991 | 864 | −13.8% |
| 2001 | 848 | −1.9% |
| 2011 | 794 | −6.4% |

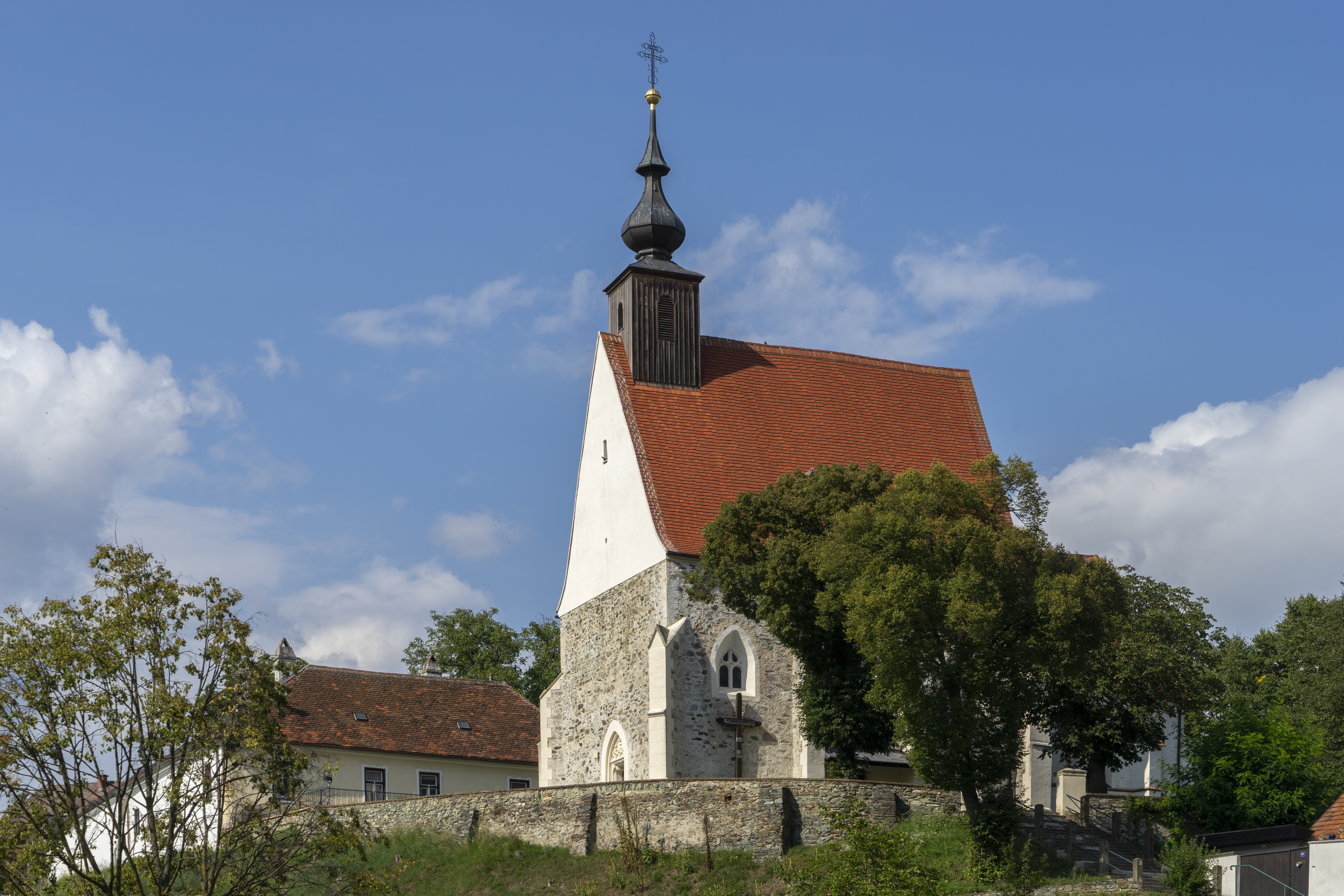
Roman Catholic parish church in Hannersdorf

== Politics ==
Of the 15 positions on the municipal council, the SPÖ has 8, and the ÖVP 7.
