= Litzelsdorf =

- Municipality
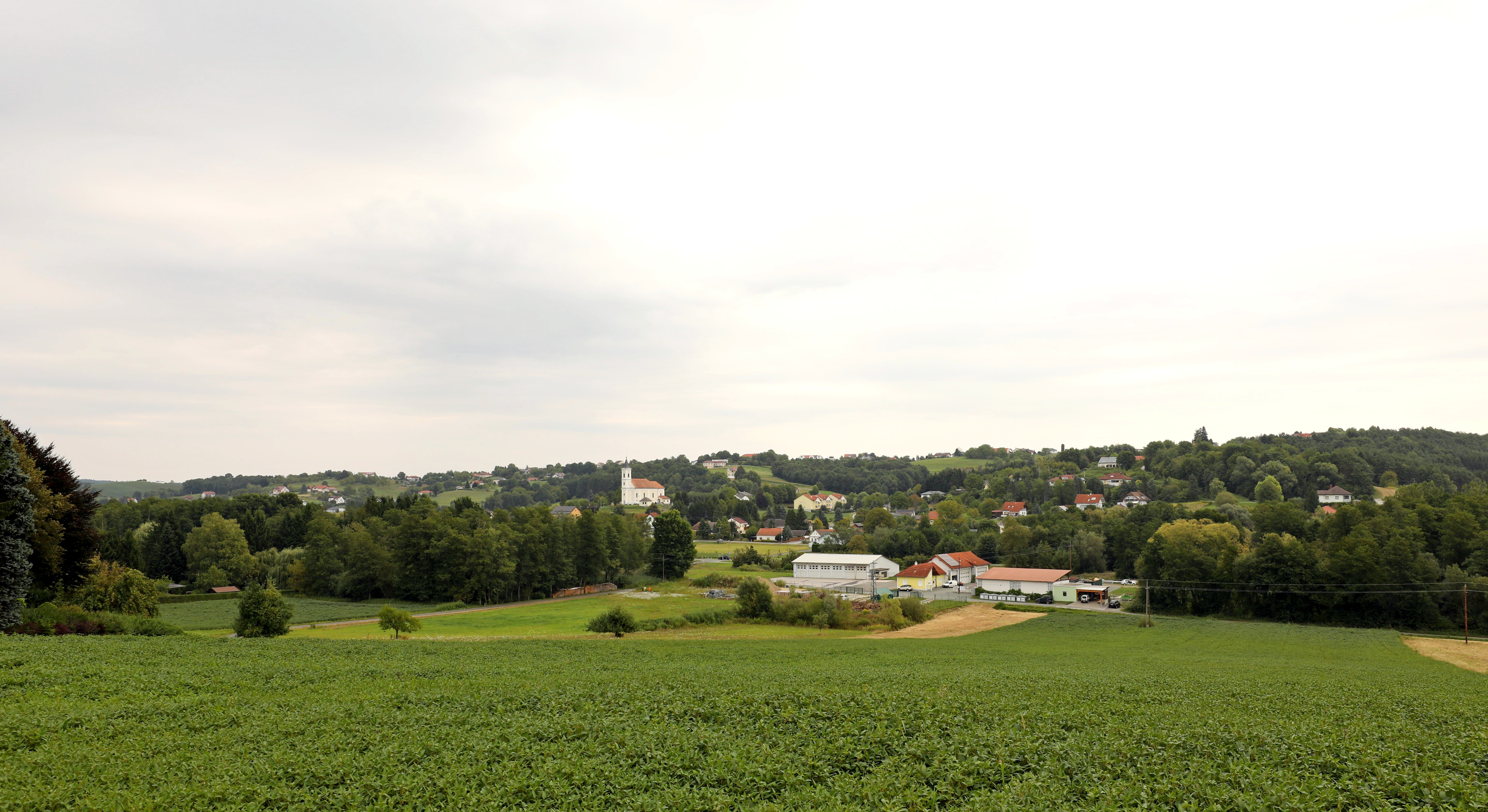
- Municipal office

- Coat of arms

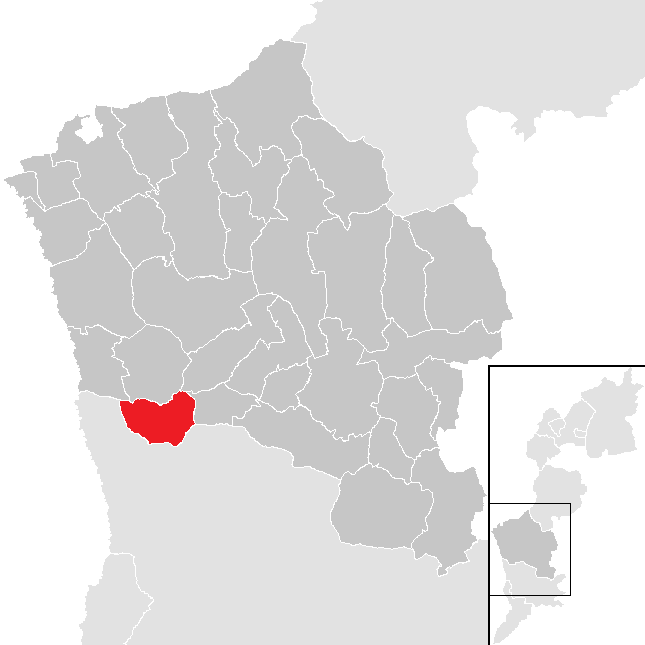
- Location within Oberwart district

- Location within Austria
- Coordinates: 47°13′N 16°10′E
- Country: Austria
- State: Burgenland
- District: Oberwart

Government
  - Mayor: Peter Fassl (ÖVP)

Area
  - Total: 13.88 km^{2} (5.36 sq mi)
- Elevation: 292 m (958 ft)

Population (2018-01-01)
  - Total: 1,181
  - Density: 85.09/km^{2} (220.4/sq mi)
- Time zone: UTC+1 (CET)
  - Summer (DST): UTC+2 (CEST)
- Postal code: 7532
- Website: www.litzelsdorf.at

Litzelsdorf (Hungarian: Lődös, Croatian: Licištrof) is a town in the district of Oberwart in the Austrian state of Burgenland.

== Geography ==
The small town is located in the south of Burgenland.

== History ==
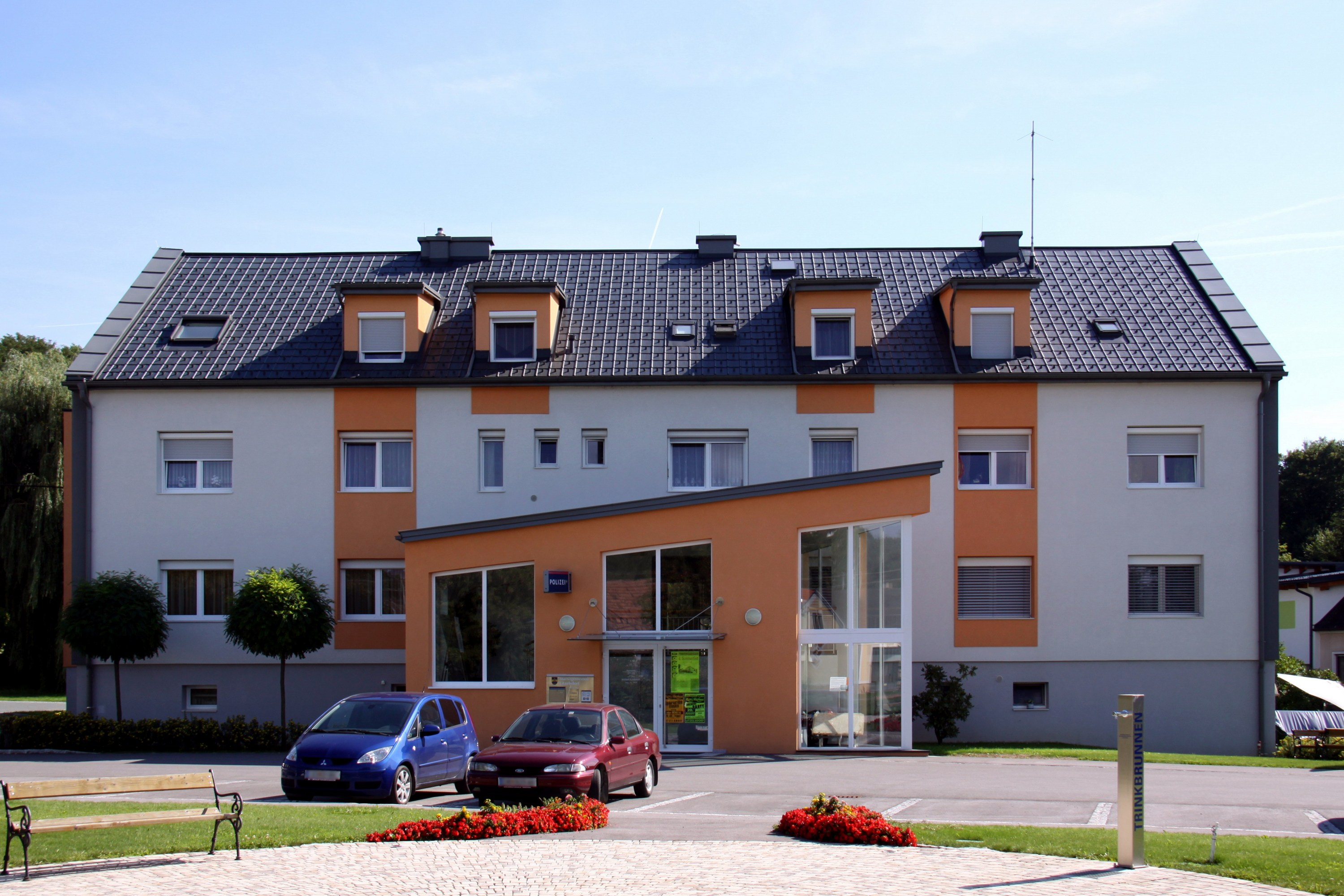
municipal office

The town of Litzelsdorf along with the whole Burgenland belonged to the Western part of the Kingdom of Hungary until 1920/21, and its official name was Lődös. After World War I Burgenland was awarded to the newly formed Republic of Austria as a result of the Treaties of St. Germain and Trianon. Since 1921 Litzelsdorf belongs to the newly formed state of Burgenland.

== Population ==
Historical population
Year	Pop.	±%
1869	1,333	—
1880	1,528	+14.6%
1890	1,729	+13.2%
1900	1,956	+13.1%
1910	1,888	−3.5%
1923	1,709	−9.5%
1934	1,618	−5.3%
1939	1,313	−18.9%
1951	1,259	−4.1%
1961	1,092	−13.3%
1971	1,155	+5.8%
1981	1,151	−0.3%
1991	1,156	+0.4%
2001	1,151	−0.4%
2011	1,144	−0.6%

== Politics ==
The current mayor of Litzelsdorf is Peter Fassl (Austrian People's Party = ÖVP) and the vice mayor is Martin Gerbafczits (Social Democratic Party of Austria = SPÖ).

== Coat of arms ==
The coat of arms is coloured in blue and gold and divided into 3 parts. The first part is blue and shows a golden triangle with rays. This is a symbol for the trinity – and a column has been built a long time ago as a sign of adoring trinity. In the second part, which is colored in gold, a blue gear wheel can be seen and in the last part, coloured in blue ears (botany) can be seen. These are symbols for trade and agriculture. coats of arms

== Twin towns ==
Litzelsdorf is twinned with:

- Memmingen, Germany
