= Wolfau =

- Municipality
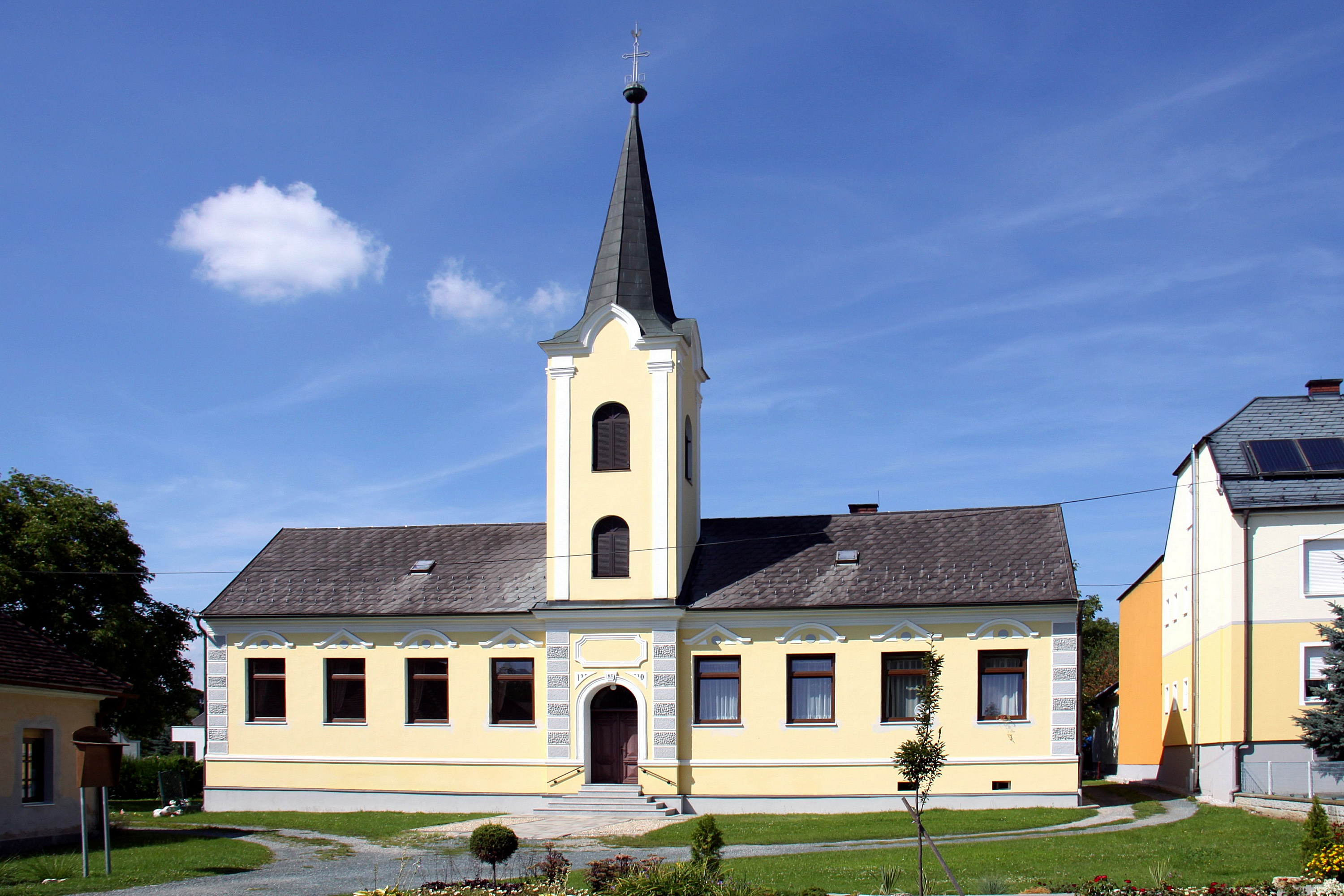

- Coat of arms

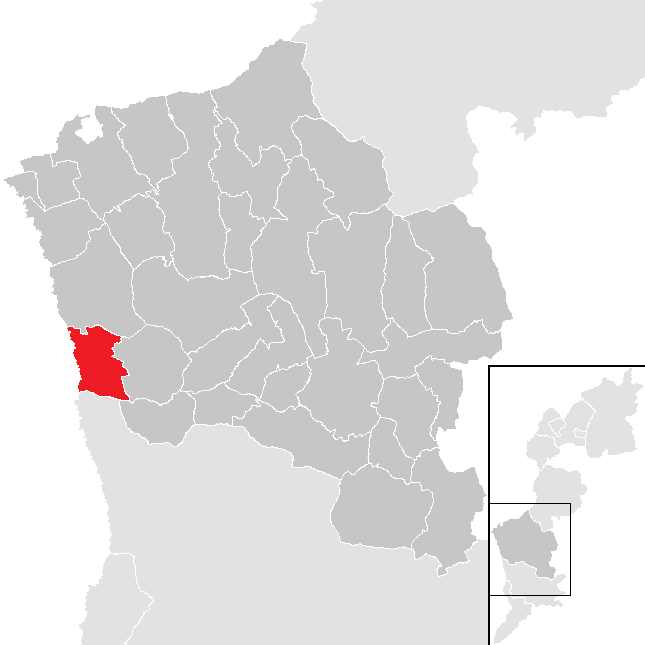
- Location within Oberwart district

- Location within Austria
- Coordinates: 47°15′N 16°6′E
- Country: Austria
- State: Burgenland
- District: Oberwart

Government
  - Mayor: Walter Pfeiffer

Area
  - Total: 15.02 km^{2} (5.80 sq mi)
- Elevation: 340 m (1,120 ft)

Population (2018-01-01)
  - Total: 1,436
  - Density: 95.61/km^{2} (247.6/sq mi)
- Time zone: UTC+1 (CET)
  - Summer (DST): UTC+2 (CEST)
- Postal code: 7412
- Website: www.wolfau.at

Wolfau (Hungarian: Vasfarkasfalva) is a town in the district of Oberwart in the Austrian state of Burgenland.

== Population ==
Historical population
Year	Pop.	±%
1869	1,561	—
1880	1,585	+1.5%
1890	1,642	+3.6%
1900	1,714	+4.4%
1910	1,656	−3.4%
1923	1,533	−7.4%
1934	1,403	−8.5%
1939	1,251	−10.8%
1951	1,237	−1.1%
1961	1,211	−2.1%
1971	1,284	+6.0%
1981	1,299	+1.2%
1991	1,333	+2.6%
2001	1,357	+1.8%
2011	1,397	+2.9%
