= Grafenschachen =

- Municipality
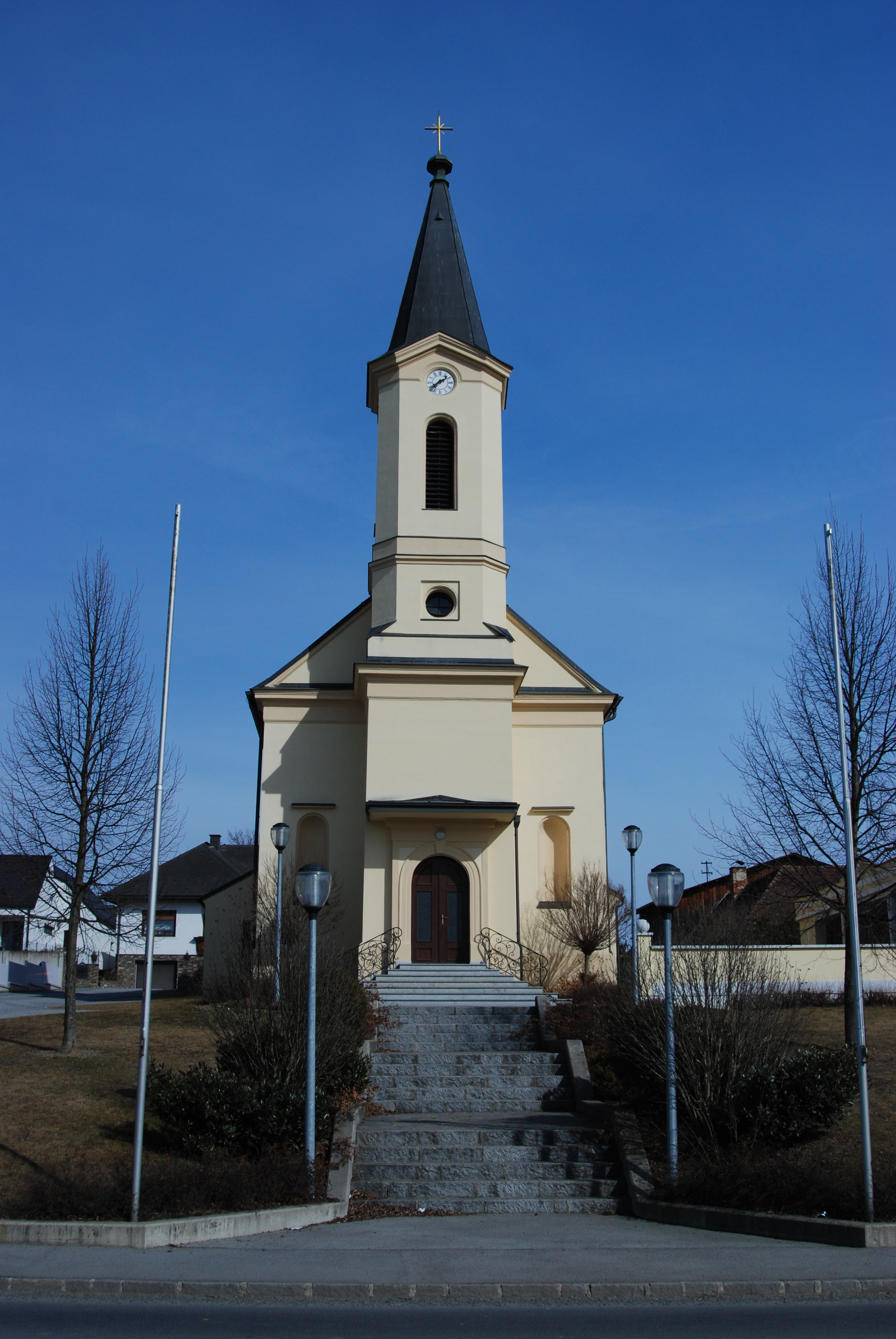
- Grafenschachen parish church

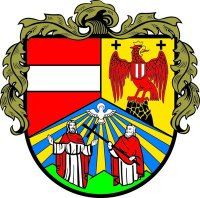
- Coat of arms

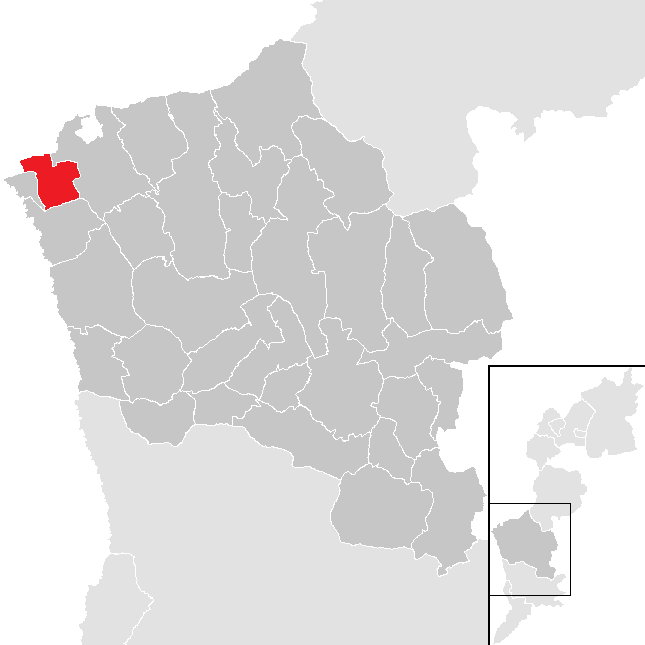
- Location within Oberwart district

- Location within Austria
- Coordinates: 47°22′N 16°4′E
- Country: Austria
- State: Burgenland
- District: Oberwart

Government
  - Mayor: Marc Hoppel (SPÖ)

Area
  - Total: 9.94 km^{2} (3.84 sq mi)

Population (2024)
  - Total: 1,221
  - Density: 123/km^{2} (318/sq mi)
- Time zone: UTC+1 (CET)
  - Summer (DST): UTC+2 (CEST)
- Postal code: 7423

Grafenschachen (Hungarian: Vasárokszállás) is a municipality in Burgenland in the district of Oberwart in Austria.

== Geography ==
Parts of the municipality are Grafenschachen and Kroisegg.

== Transportation ==
The nearest train station is located in the town of Pinkafeld, with links to Vienna and the rest of Europe.

== Politics ==
Of the 19 positions on the municipal council, the SPÖ has 15 and the ÖVP has 4.

== Population ==
Historical population
Year	Pop.	±%
1869	923	—
1880	1,031	+11.7%
1890	1,191	+15.5%
1900	1,218	+2.3%
1910	1,163	−4.5%
1923	1,163	+0.0%
1934	1,085	−6.7%
1939	1,063	−2.0%
1951	1,029	−3.2%
1961	1,087	+5.6%
1971	1,157	+6.4%
1981	1,153	−0.3%
1991	1,161	+0.7%
2001	1,177	+1.4%
2011	1,257	+6.8%
2024	1,221	−2.9%
