= Markt Allhau =

- Municipality
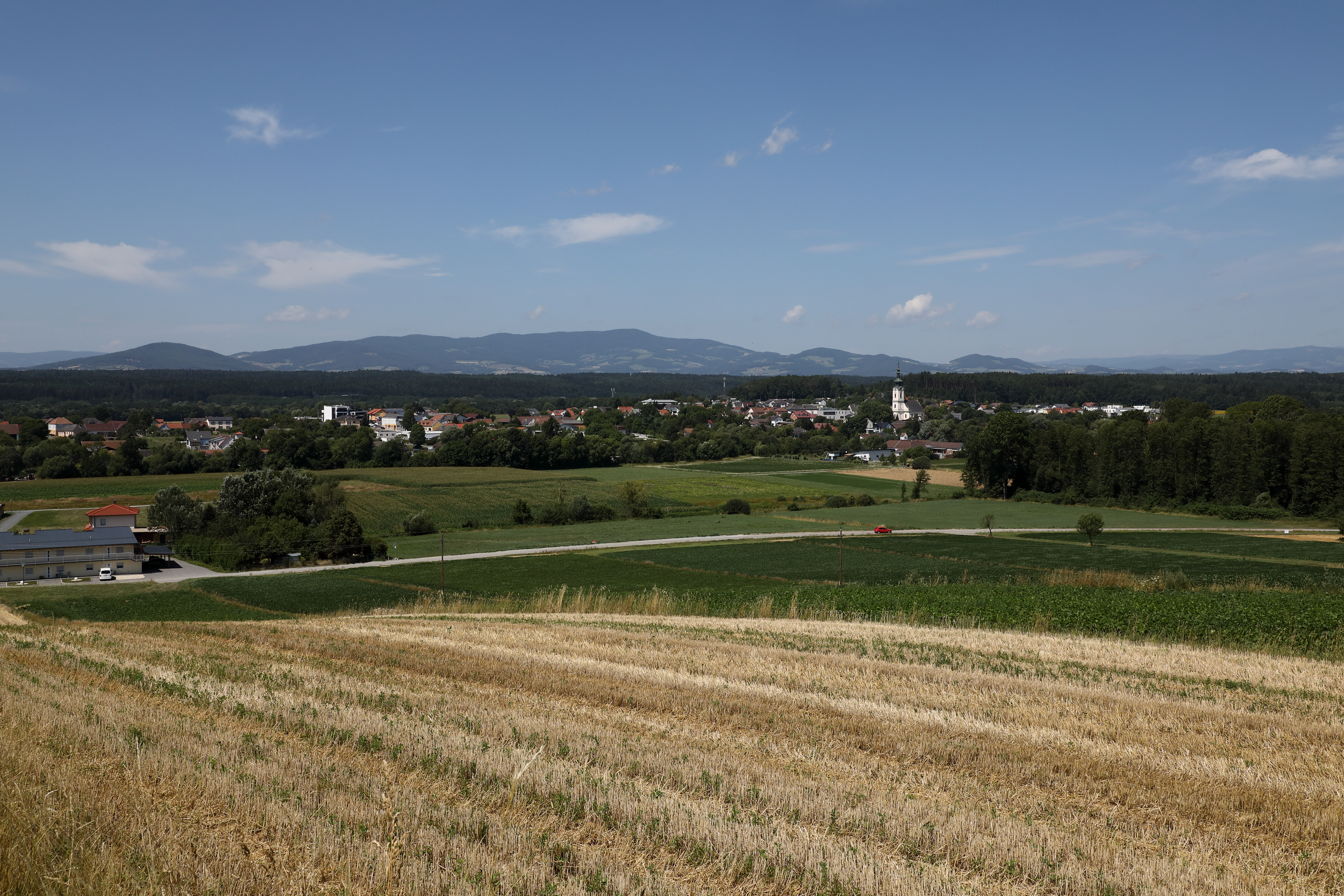
- View of Markt Allhau

- Coat of arms

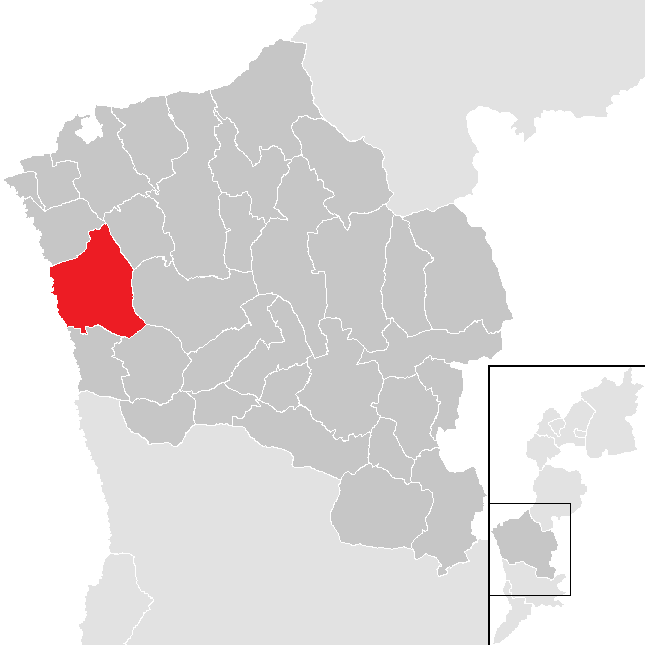
- Location within Oberwart district

- Location within Austria
- Coordinates: 47°17′N 16°5′E
- Country: Austria
- State: Burgenland
- District: Oberwart

Government
  - Mayor: Hermann Pferschy

Area
  - Total: 32.31 km^{2} (12.47 sq mi)
- Elevation: 349 m (1,145 ft)

Population (2018-01-01)
  - Total: 1,845
  - Density: 57.10/km^{2} (147.9/sq mi)
- Time zone: UTC+1 (CET)
  - Summer (DST): UTC+2 (CEST)
- Postal code: 7411
- Website: http://www.marktallhau.at

Markt Allhau (Croatian: Oljhava) is a town in the district of Oberwart in the Austrian state of Burgenland.

== Population ==
Historical population
| Year | Pop. | ±% |
|---|---|---|
| 1869 | 2,578 | — |
| 1880 | 2,695 | +4.5% |
| 1890 | 2,857 | +6.0% |
| 1900 | 2,860 | +0.1% |
| 1910 | 2,671 | −6.6% |
| 1923 | 2,451 | −8.2% |
| 1934 | 2,460 | +0.4% |
| 1939 | 2,217 | −9.9% |
| 1951 | 1,807 | −18.5% |
| 1961 | 1,736 | −3.9% |
| 1971 | 1,688 | −2.8% |
| 1981 | 1,702 | +0.8% |
| 1991 | 1,740 | +2.2% |
| 2001 | 1,769 | +1.7% |
| 2011 | 1,819 | +2.8% |
