= Riedlingsdorf =

- Municipality
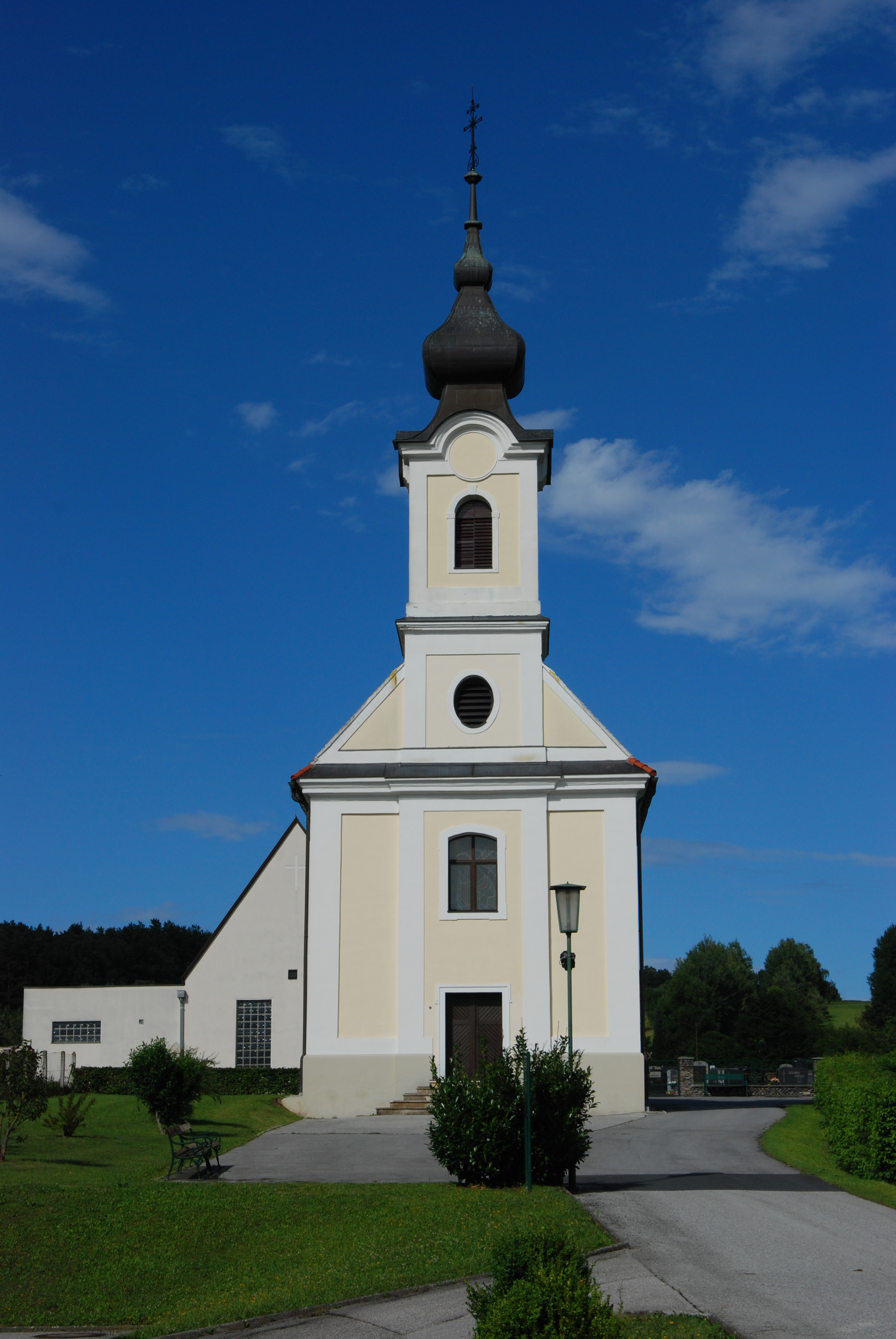
- Catholic church in Riedlingsdorf

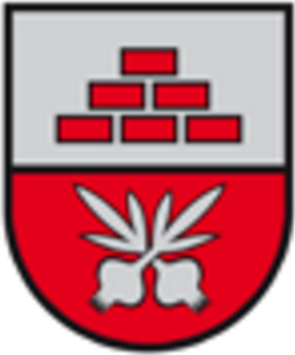
- Coat of arms

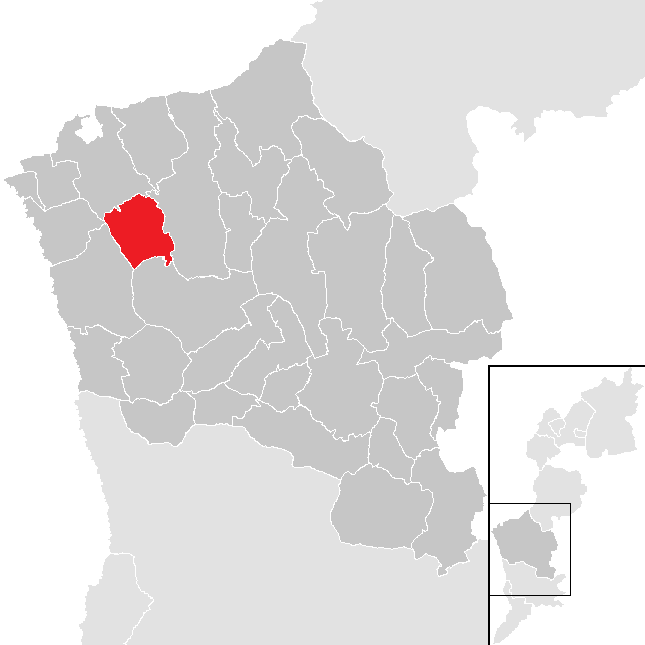
- Location within Oberwart district

- Location within Austria
- Coordinates: 47°21′N 16°8′E
- Country: Austria
- State: Burgenland
- District: Oberwart

Government
  - Mayor: Erwin Kaipel (SPÖ)

Area
  - Total: 16.13 km^{2} (6.23 sq mi)
- Elevation: 317 m (1,040 ft)

Population (2024)
  - Total: 1,656
  - Density: 102.7/km^{2} (265.9/sq mi)
- Time zone: UTC+1 (CET)
  - Summer (DST): UTC+2 (CEST)
- Postal code: 7422

Riedlingsdorf (Hungarian: Rödöny) is a municipality in Burgenland in the district Oberwart in Austria.

== History ==
Until 1921 Riedlingsdorf belonged to Hungary, like the whole of Burgenland.

== Politics ==
Of the 19 positions on the municipal council, the SPÖ has 11, the ÖVP 3, and the ZLR 5.

== Population ==
Historical population
Year	Pop.	±%
1869	1,545	—
1880	1,514	−2.0%
1890	1,584	+4.6%
1900	1,666	+5.2%
1910	1,565	−6.1%
1923	1,485	−5.1%
1934	1,571	+5.8%
1939	1,544	−1.7%
1951	1,537	−0.5%
1961	1,549	+0.8%
1971	1,581	+2.1%
1981	1,569	−0.8%
1991	1,549	−1.3%
2001	1,633	+5.4%
2011	1,663	+1.8%
2024	1,656	−0.4%
