= Mariasdorf =

- Municipality
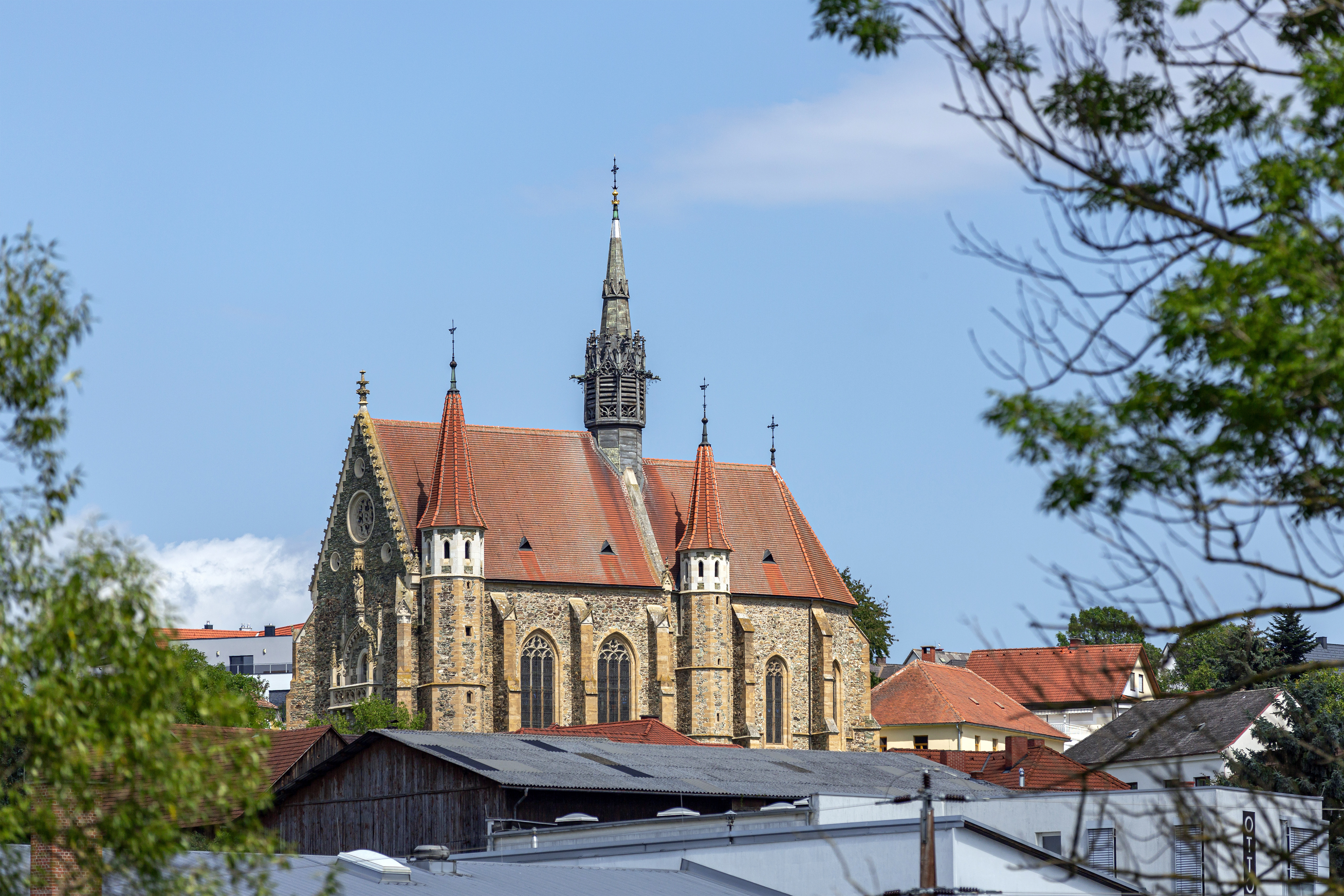

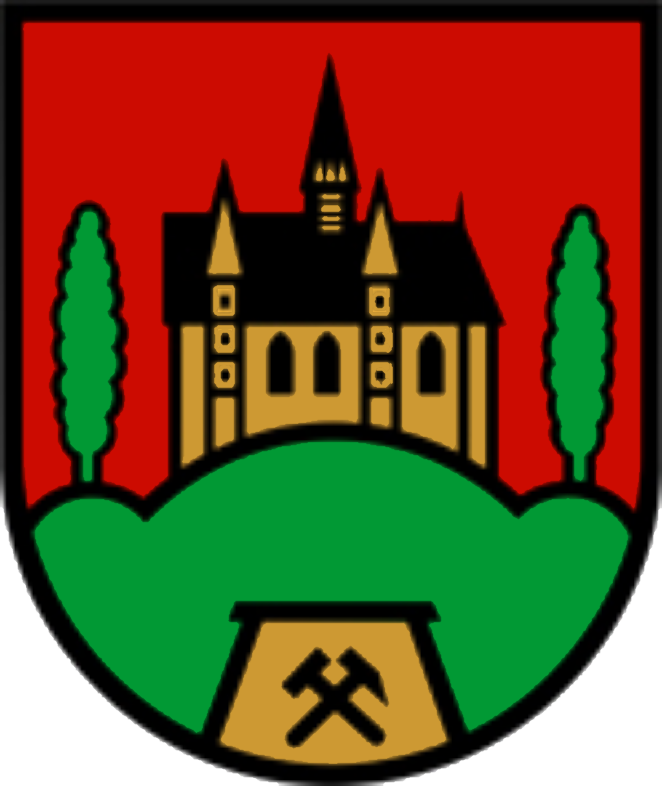
- Coat of arms

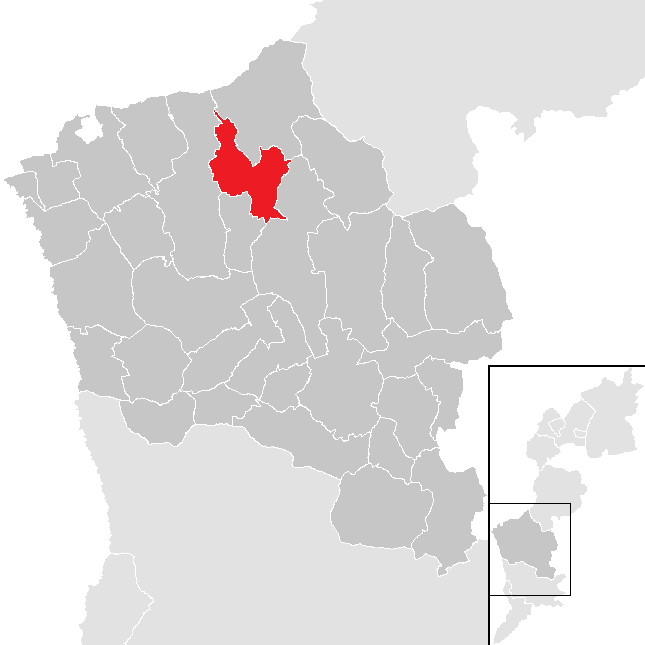
- Location within Oberwart district

- Location within Austria
- Coordinates: 47°22′N 16°14′E
- Country: Austria
- State: Burgenland
- District: Oberwart

Government
  - Mayor: Reinard Berger

Area
  - Total: 20.54 km^{2} (7.93 sq mi)
- Elevation: 412 m (1,352 ft)

Population (2018-01-01)
  - Total: 1,145
  - Density: 55.74/km^{2} (144.4/sq mi)
- Time zone: UTC+1 (CET)
  - Summer (DST): UTC+2 (CEST)
- Postal code: 7433
- Website: www.mariasdorf.at

Mariasdorf (Hungarian: Máriafalva) is a town in the district of Oberwart in the Austrian state of Burgenland.

== Population ==
Historical population
Year	Pop.	±%
1869	1,580	—
1880	1,626	+2.9%
1890	1,691	+4.0%
1900	1,625	−3.9%
1910	1,435	−11.7%
1923	1,416	−1.3%
1934	1,514	+6.9%
1939	1,452	−4.1%
1951	1,355	−6.7%
1961	1,535	+13.3%
1971	1,431	−6.8%
1981	1,362	−4.8%
1991	1,315	−3.5%
2001	1,257	−4.4%
2011	1,198	−4.7%
