= Kohfidisch =

- Municipality
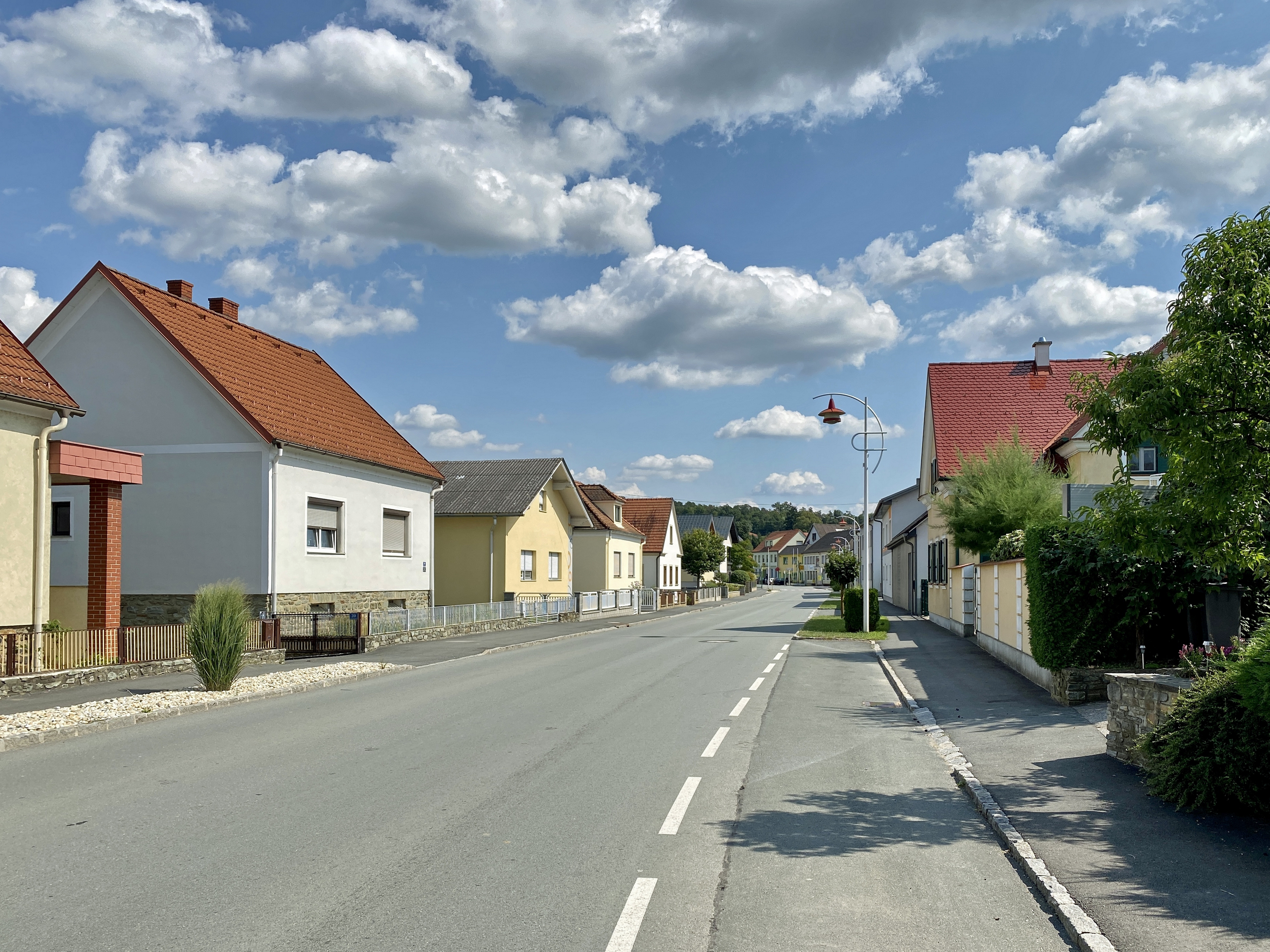
- The main street in 2021

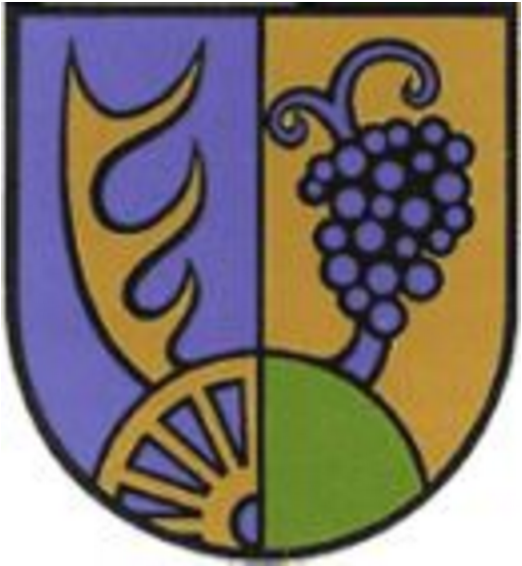
- Coat of arms

- Location within Austria
- Coordinates: 47°10′N 16°21′E
- Country: Austria
- State: Burgenland
- District: Oberwart

Government
  - Mayor: Norbert Sulyok (ÖVP)

Area
  - Total: 31.34 km^{2} (12.10 sq mi)
- Elevation: 258 m (846 ft)

Population (2018-01-01)
  - Total: 1,462
  - Density: 46.65/km^{2} (120.8/sq mi)
- Time zone: UTC+1 (CET)
  - Summer (DST): UTC+2 (CEST)
- Postal code: 7512
- Area code: 03366
- Vehicle registration: OW
- Website: www.kohfidisch.at

Kohfidisch (German pronunciation: [koːˈfiːdɪʃ]; Hungarian: Gyepűfüzes, Croatian: Gornji Fideš, Burgenland Croatian: Zgornji Fideš) is a municipality in the district of Oberwart in the Austrian state of Burgenland.

== Geography ==
The municipality is composed of the main town Kohfidisch and the two villages Kirchfidisch (German pronunciation: [ˌkɪʁçˈfiːdɪʃ]) and Harmisch.

== Population ==
Historical population
Year	Pop.	±%
1869	1,357	—
1880	1,492	+9.9%
1890	1,566	+5.0%
1900	1,746	+11.5%
1910	1,697	−2.8%
1923	1,521	−10.4%
1934	1,583	+4.1%
1939	1,504	−5.0%
1951	1,467	−2.5%
1961	1,478	+0.7%
1971	1,611	+9.0%
1981	1,625	+0.9%
1991	1,492	−8.2%
2001	1,472	−1.3%
2011	1,444	−1.9%
