= Neustift an der Lafnitz =

- Municipality
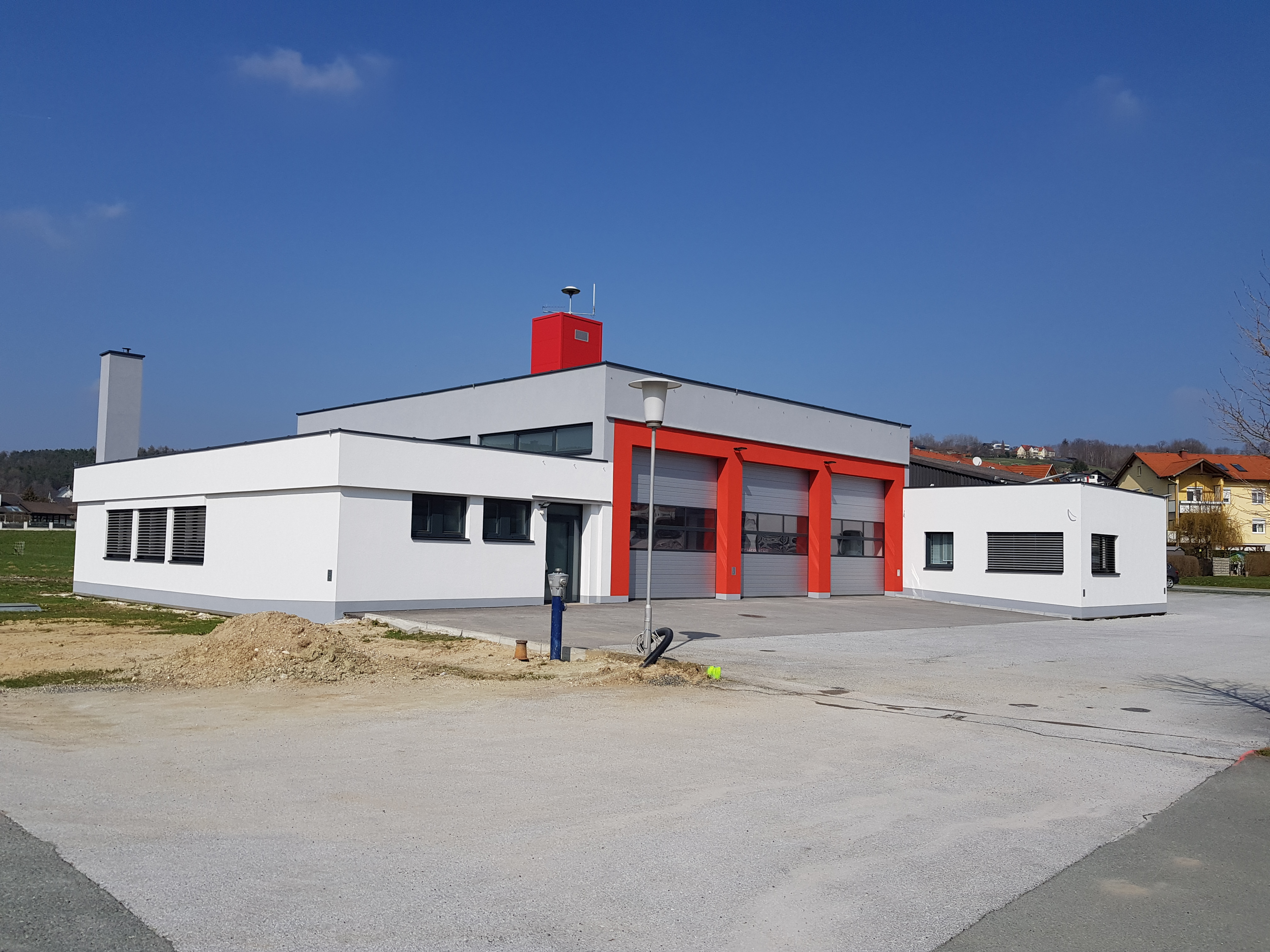
- Fire station in Neustift

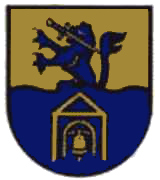
- Coat of arms

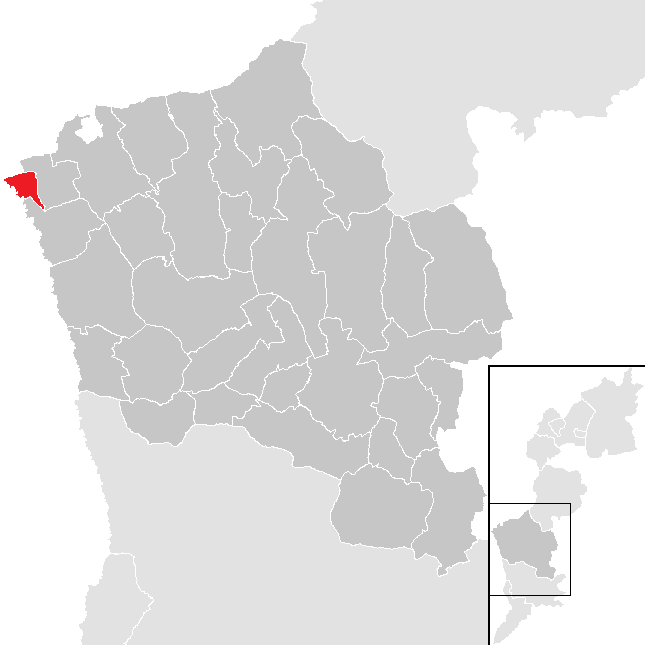
- Location within Oberwart district

- Location within Austria
- Coordinates: 47°22′N 16°2′E
- Country: Austria
- State: Burgenland
- District: Oberwart

Government
  - Mayor: Johann Kremnitzer

Area
  - Total: 3.5 km^{2} (1.4 sq mi)
- Elevation: 410 m (1,350 ft)

Population (2018-01-01)
  - Total: 793
  - Density: 230/km^{2} (590/sq mi)
- Time zone: UTC+1 (CET)
  - Summer (DST): UTC+2 (CEST)
- Postal code: 7423

Neustift an der Lafnitz (Hungarian: Lapincsújtelek) is a town in the district of Oberwart in the Austrian state of Burgenland.

== Population ==
Historical population
Year	Pop.	±%
1869	458	—
1880	512	+11.8%
1890	606	+18.4%
1900	617	+1.8%
1910	601	−2.6%
1923	561	−6.7%
1934	615	+9.6%
1939	656	+6.7%
1951	434	−33.8%
1961	562	+29.5%
1971	475	−15.5%
1981	526	+10.7%
1991	580	+10.3%
2001	627	+8.1%
2011	751	+19.8%
