= Deutsch Schützen-Eisenberg =

- Municipality
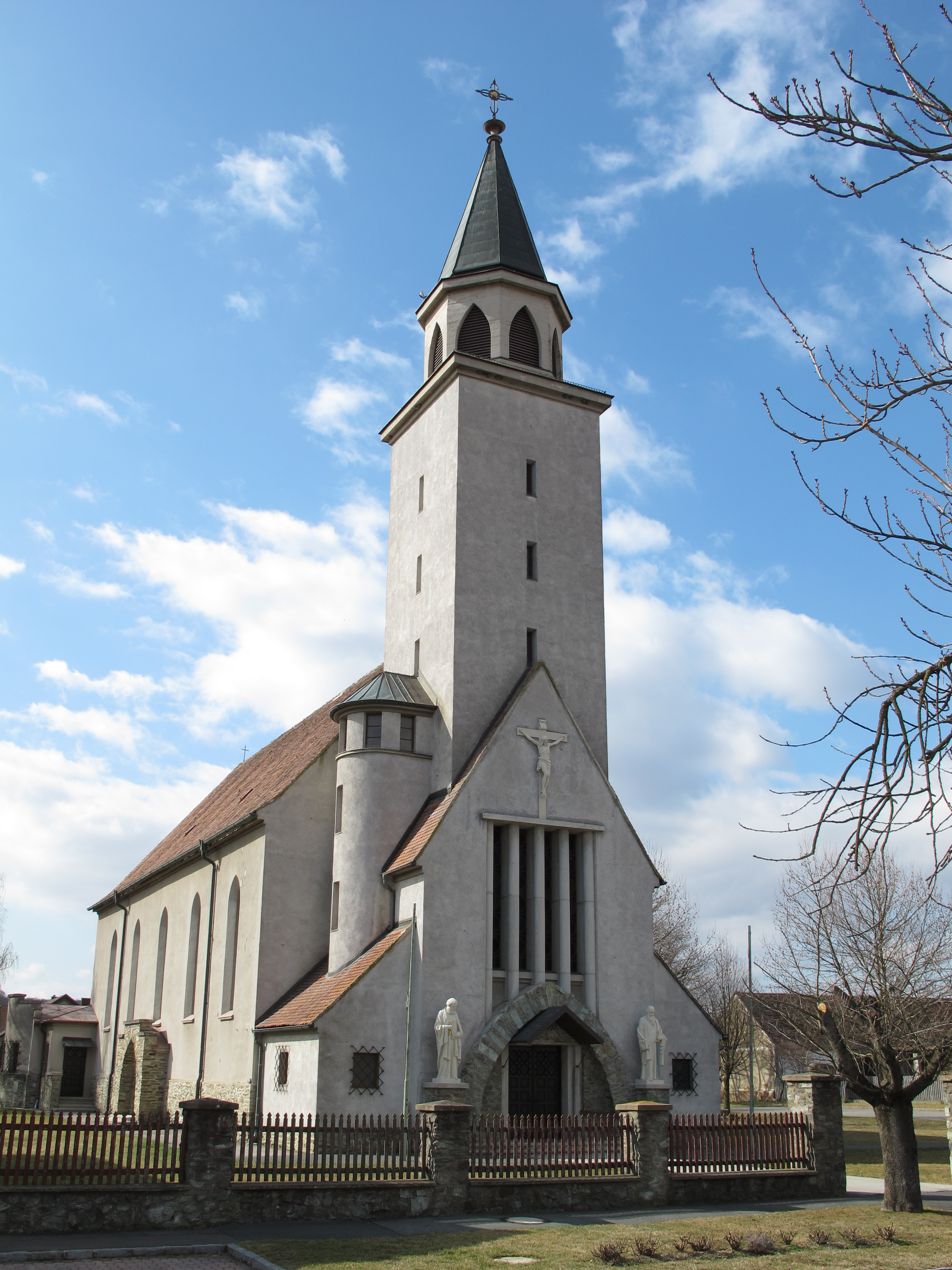
- Parish Church of the Virgin Mary

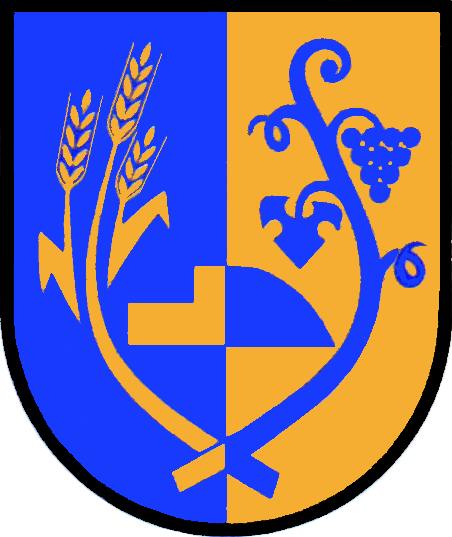
- Coat of arms

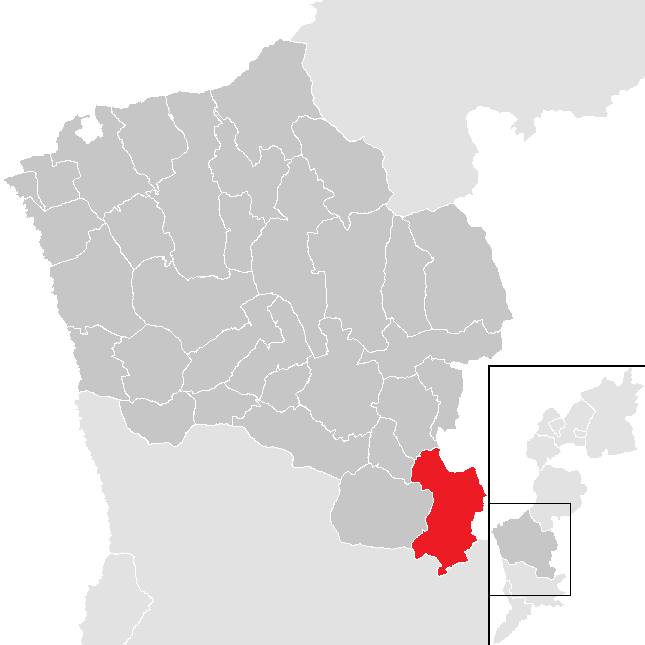
- Location within Oberwart district

- Location within Austria
- Coordinates: 47°10′N 16°26′E
- Country: Austria
- State: Burgenland
- District: Oberwart

Government
  - Mayor: Franz Wachter (ÖVP)

Area
  - Total: 28.43 km^{2} (10.98 sq mi)
- Elevation: 227 m (745 ft)

Population (2018-01-01)
  - Total: 1,126
  - Density: 39.61/km^{2} (102.6/sq mi)
- Time zone: UTC+1 (CET)
  - Summer (DST): UTC+2 (CEST)
- Postal code: 7474
- Website: www.eisenberg.at

Deutsch Schützen-Eisenberg (Hungarian: Németlövő-Csejke, Croatian: Livio-Čjeka) is a municipality in Burgenland in the district of Oberwart in Austria.

It was the site of the 1945 Deutsch Schützen massacre.

== Geography ==
Parts of the municipality are Deutsch-Schützen, Edlitz im Burgenland, Eisenberg an der Pinka, Höll, and Sankt Kathrein im Burgenland.

== Population ==
Historical population
Year	Pop.	±%
1869	1,838	—
1880	1,908	+3.8%
1890	2,091	+9.6%
1900	2,214	+5.9%
1910	2,064	−6.8%
1923	1,937	−6.2%
1934	1,823	−5.9%
1939	1,829	+0.3%
1951	1,727	−5.6%
1961	1,515	−12.3%
1971	1,438	−5.1%
1981	1,338	−7.0%
1991	1,247	−6.8%
2001	1,189	−4.7%
2011	1,120	−5.8%

== Politics ==
The municipal council has 19 positions, of which the ÖVP has 14, the SPÖ 3, and the FPÖ 2.
