= Stift (disambiguation) =

A Stift can be:

- a German (der Stift [plural Stifte]) and Dutch word for 'pen', 'pencil', cylindric 'pin' or 'peg'
- a Swedish (stiftet [plural stift]) word for cylindric 'pin', 'peg' or 'pencil lead' (but not pen or pencil).
- a German word (der Stift [plural Stifte]) for a freshman 'apprentice'
- a German word (das Stift [plural Stifte]; Dutch corresponding het sticht) for an endowment of estates, or landed estates under the secular rule of a prince of the church; also in compounds such as Hochstift
  - Tübinger Stift
- a Nordic administrative jurisdiction, under a bailiff (Danish: Stiftamtmand; Amtmann or Ammann in Switzerland)
- a Nordic expression for an ecclesiastical diocese
