= Wiesfleck =

- Municipality
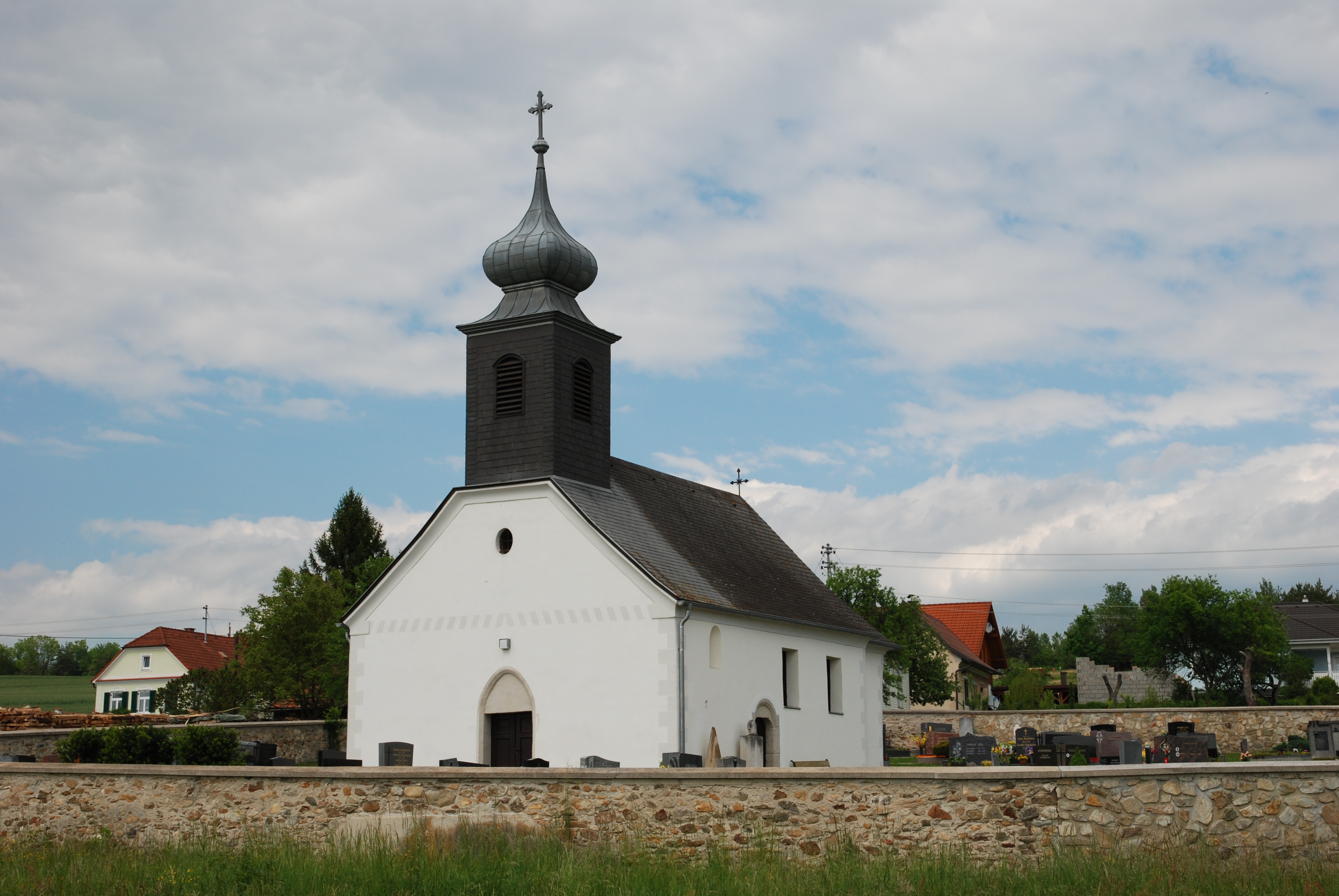
- Catholic church in Wiesfleck

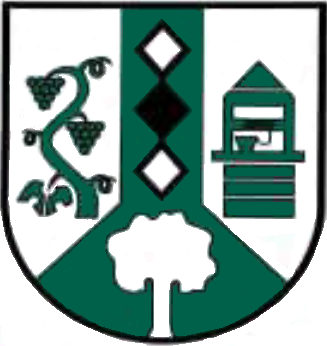
- Coat of arms

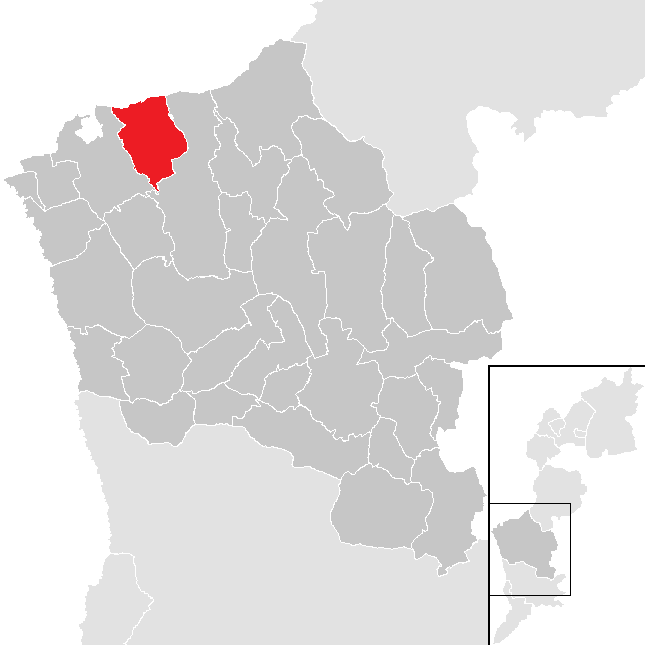
- Location within Oberwart district

- Location within Austria
- Coordinates: 47°23′N 16°9′E
- Country: Austria
- State: Burgenland
- District: Oberwart

Government
  - Mayor: Hans Brenner

Area
  - Total: 20.08 km^{2} (7.75 sq mi)
- Elevation: 409 m (1,342 ft)

Population (2018-01-01)
  - Total: 1,158
  - Density: 57.67/km^{2} (149.4/sq mi)
- Time zone: UTC+1 (CET)
  - Summer (DST): UTC+2 (CEST)
- Postal code: 7423
- Website: www.wiesfleck.at

Wiesfleck (Hungarian: Újrétfalu) is a town in the district of Oberwart in the Austrian state of Burgenland.

== Population ==
Historical population
Year	Pop.	±%
1869	1,366	—
1880	1,394	+2.0%
1890	1,361	−2.4%
1900	1,549	+13.8%
1910	1,516	−2.1%
1923	1,518	+0.1%
1934	1,522	+0.3%
1939	1,485	−2.4%
1951	1,147	−22.8%
1961	1,141	−0.5%
1971	1,165	+2.1%
1981	1,132	−2.8%
1991	1,129	−0.3%
2001	1,178	+4.3%
2011	1,100	−6.6%
