= Mischendorf =

- Municipality
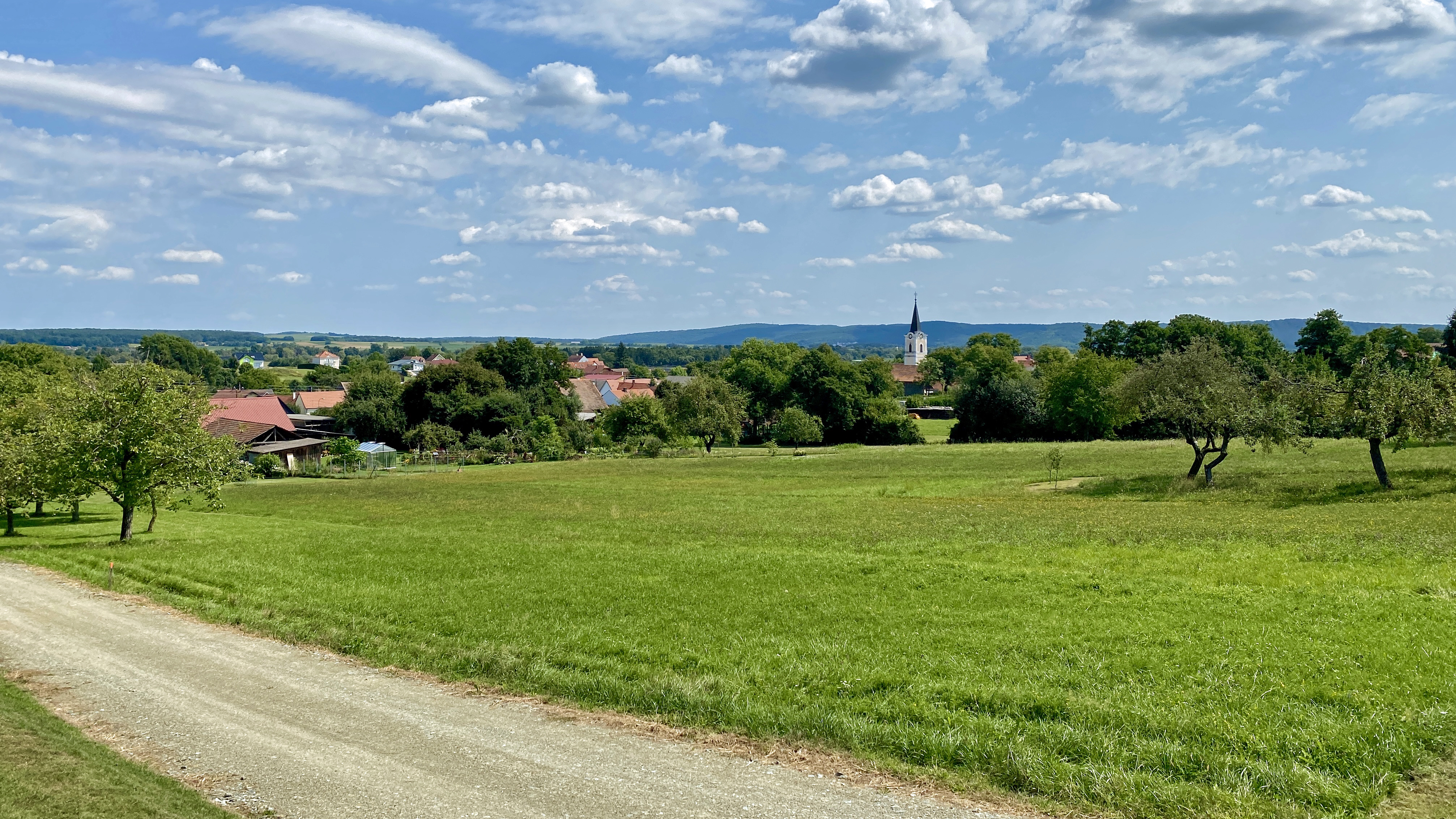
- View of Mischendorf

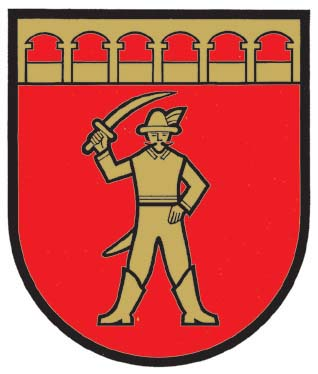
- Coat of arms

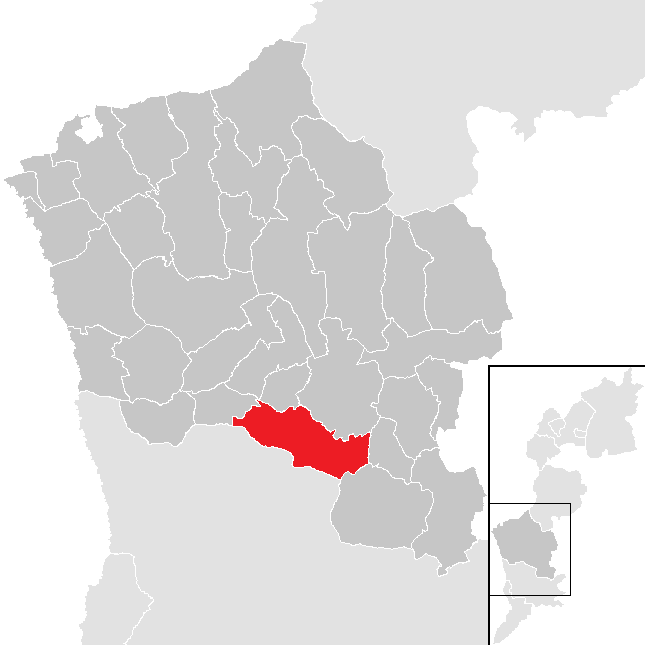
- Location within Oberwart district

- Location within Austria
- Coordinates: 47°12′N 16°19′E
- Country: Austria
- State: Burgenland
- District: Oberwart

Government
  - Mayor: Martin Csebits

Area
  - Total: 26.19 km^{2} (10.11 sq mi)
- Elevation: 272 m (892 ft)

Population (2018-01-01)
  - Total: 1,589
  - Density: 60.67/km^{2} (157.1/sq mi)
- Time zone: UTC+1 (CET)
  - Summer (DST): UTC+2 (CEST)
- Postal code: 7411

Mischendorf is a town in the district of Oberwart in the Austrian state of Burgenland.

== Population ==
Historical population
Year	Pop.	±%
1869	1,962	—
1880	2,132	+8.7%
1890	2,365	+10.9%
1900	2,472	+4.5%
1910	2,312	−6.5%
1923	2,194	−5.1%
1934	2,220	+1.2%
1939	2,083	−6.2%
1951	1,904	−8.6%
1961	1,935	+1.6%
1971	1,984	+2.5%
1981	1,957	−1.4%
1991	2,017	+3.1%
2001	1,744	−13.5%
2011	1,705	−2.2%
