= Burgkirchen =

Burgkirchen may refer to:

- Burgkirchen an der Alz, a municipality in Bavaria, Germany
- Burgkirchen am Wald, part of the municipality of Tüßling in Bavaria, Germany
- Burgkirchen, Austria, a municipality in Upper Austria

== See also ==
- Burgkirche (disambiguation)
