= Reinhold Hintermaier =

Austrian footballer

Personal information
- Date of birth: 14 February 1956 (age 70)
- Place of birth: Altheim, Austria
- Height: 1.82 m (6 ft 0 in)
- Position: Midfielder

Youth career
- 1972–1975: SK Altheim

Senior career*
Years	Team	Apps	(Gls)
1975–1979	SK VÖEST Linz	123	(18)
1979–1984	1. FC Nürnberg	109	(15)
1984–1986	Eintracht Braunschweig	63	(3)
1986–1988	1. FC Saarbrücken	52	(5)
1992–1993	1. FC Nürnberg	5	(1)
1994–1995	1. FC Nürnberg	14	(0)

International career
1978–1982	Austria	15	(1)

Managerial career
- 1995: FC Linz
- * Club domestic league appearances and goals

Reinhold Hintermaier (born 14 February 1956) is an Austrian former footballer who played as a midfielder.

== Club career ==
Hintermaier was born in Altheim. He started his professional career with SK VÖEST Linz and won the Austrian Football Bundesliga title in his first season. After six years he moved to Germany to play for 1. FC Nürnberg with whom he lost the German Cup Final in 1982, Eintracht Braunschweig and 1. FC Saarbrücken.

He retired in 1988 but curiously made a comeback four years later with Nürnberg where he had been youth team coach. After his second retirement, he became youth coach again at Nürnberg and Greuther Fürth.

== International career ==
He earned 15 caps for the Austria national team between 1978 and 1982 and played in the 1982 FIFA World Cup, where he scored a goal in the second round match against Northern Ireland.

== Honours ==
VÖEST Linz

- Austrian Football Bundesliga: 1973–74
