= Franz Michael Vierthaler =

Austrian pedagogue

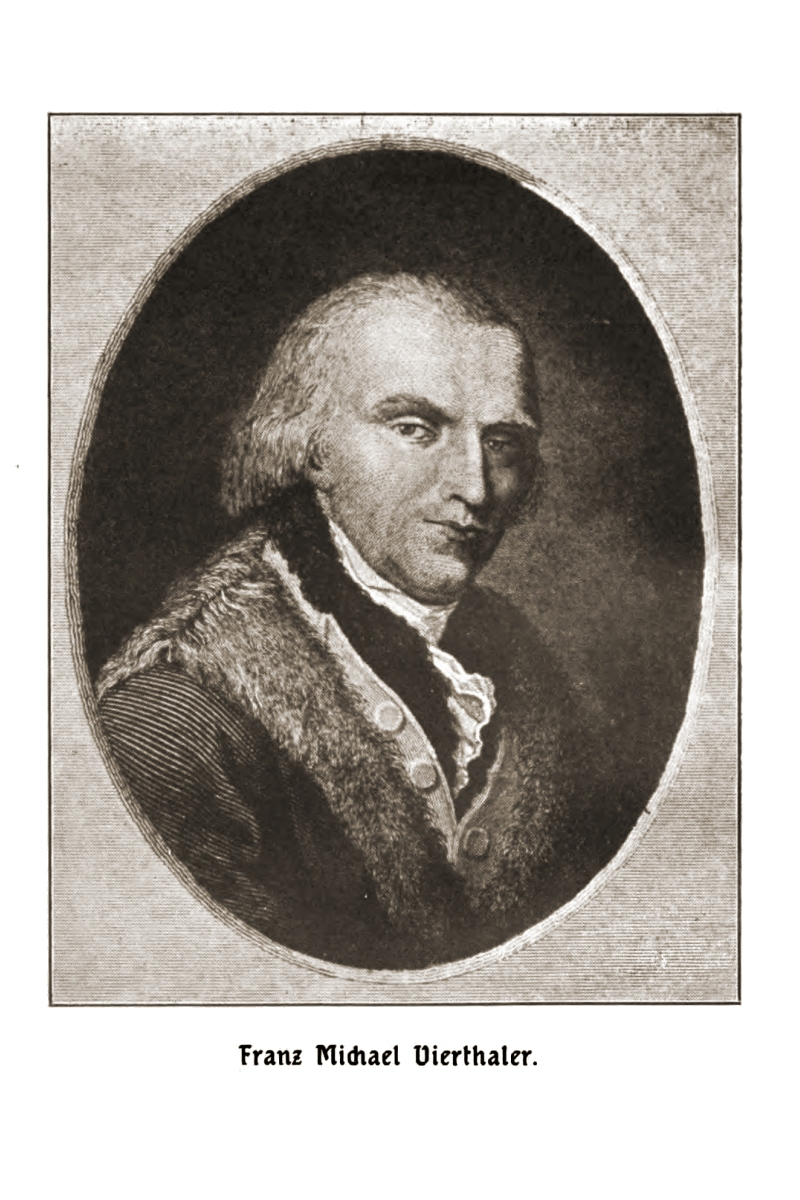
- Born: 25 September 1758; Mauerkirchen, Austria
- Died: 3 October 1827 (aged 69); Vienna, Austrian Empire
- Occupation: Educator

Franz Michael Vierthaler (25 September 1758 – 3 October 1827) was a pedagogue from the Holy Roman Empire and later the Austrian Empire.

== Life ==
Vierthaler was born in Mauerkirchen, Upper Austria. As his parents were poor, he was a choir-boy at the Benedictine Abbey of Michaelbeuren and at Salzburg. At Salzburg he also attended the gymnasium and from 1776 to 77, he took the law course at the university, though his favourite study was classical languages. In 1783 he became instructor at the Virgilian college for nobles at Salzburg.

By teaching history, Vierthaler was led to write his Philosophische Geschichte der Menschheit (7 vols., 1787–1819). The first volume attracted attention and gained for Vierthaler, in 1790, the position of director of the seminary for teachers at Salzburg, which the archbishop had established for the betterment of the primary schools. In the same year he began a course of catechetical instruction for the students of the seminary for boys, and in 1791 pedagogical lectures at the university.

In 1796, Vierthaler was made court librarian. From 1800 to 1802 he edited the Salzburger Literaturzeitung, and from 1799 to 1806 the Salzburger Staatszeitung. He married in 1802. In 1803 he was appointed supervisor of the public schools in the Duchy of Salzburg, and in 1804, supervisor of the two orphan asylums. Three years later, when Salzburg was made part of Austria, the Austrian Government called him to Vienna, where he took charge of the orphan asylum.

In 1815, the young Franz Schubert, then a teacher at a school where Vierthaler was headmaster, composed a cantata in Vierthaler's honor.

Vierthaler was a strong advocate of practical training in teaching. He kept up a correspondence with the young teachers from the seminary and encouraged their zeal. He prepared a unified plan of studies for schools that he visited, sought to provide good and cheap schoolbooks and other aids to study, and succeeded in arousing public interest in the cause of the schools.

The Catholic Encyclopedia describes Vierthaler as "a master in his calling, distinguished by the clearness, simplicity, and practicalness of his teachings." He laid more emphasis than other teachers of his era on the principle that instruction should subserve education. The aim of his pedagogical method was a "noble humanity transfigured by God". The basis of all his efforts was the Catholic Faith which he placed above everything else. Like Overberg he regarded the personality of the teacher as the most important thing in education. In many respects he was ahead of his times, e.g. in his high estimation of the teaching of the natural sciences and of physical training; also in his opposition to corporal punishment.

== Works ==
Vierthaler's three chief pedagogical works are:

- Elemente der Methodik und Padagogik (1791)
- Geist der Sokratik (1793)
- Entwurf der Schulerziehungskunde (1794)

Besides his pedagogical writings Vierthaler wrote a large number of schoolbooks and books for children; among these are an edition of the Gospels and Epistles and a geography of Salzburg.
