= Treubach =

- Municipality
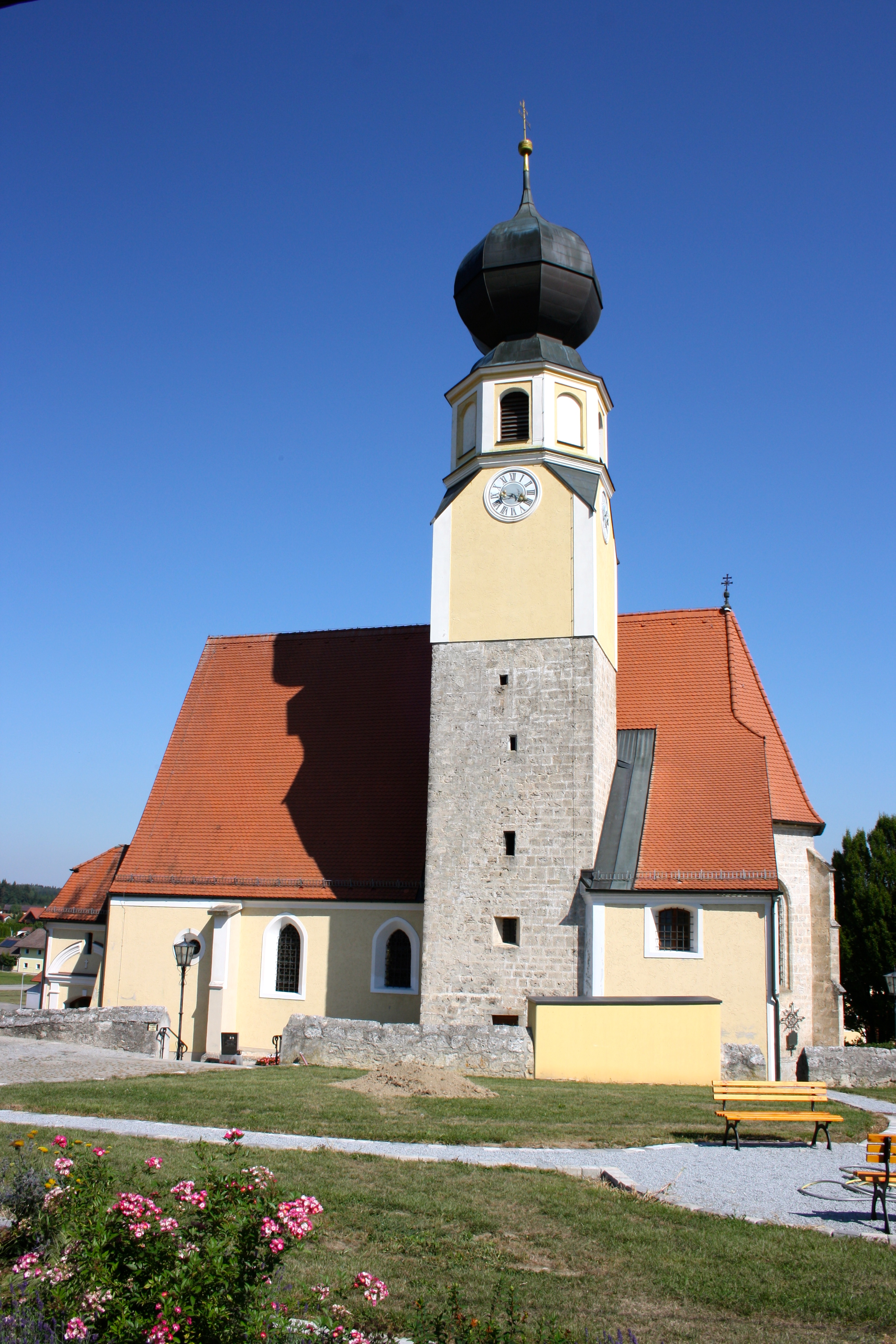

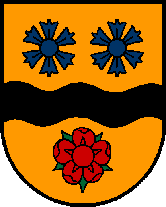
- Coat of arms

- Location within Austria
- Coordinates: 48°11′42″N 13°12′47″E
- Country: Austria
- State: Upper Austria
- District: Braunau am Inn

Government
  - Mayor: Hannes Huber (ÖVP)

Area
  - Total: 13.04 km^{2} (5.03 sq mi)
- Elevation: 417 m (1,368 ft)

Population (2018-01-01)
  - Total: 725
  - Density: 55.6/km^{2} (144/sq mi)
- Time zone: UTC+1 (CET)
  - Summer (DST): UTC+2 (CEST)
- Postal code: 5272 Treubach, 5271 Moosbach
- Area code: 07724
- Vehicle registration: BR
- Website: www.treubach.ooe.gv.at

Treubach is a municipality in the district of Braunau am Inn in the Austrian state of Upper Austria.

== Geography ==
Treubach lies in the Innviertel. About 17 percent of the municipality is forest and 76 percent farmland.
