= Überackern =

- Municipality
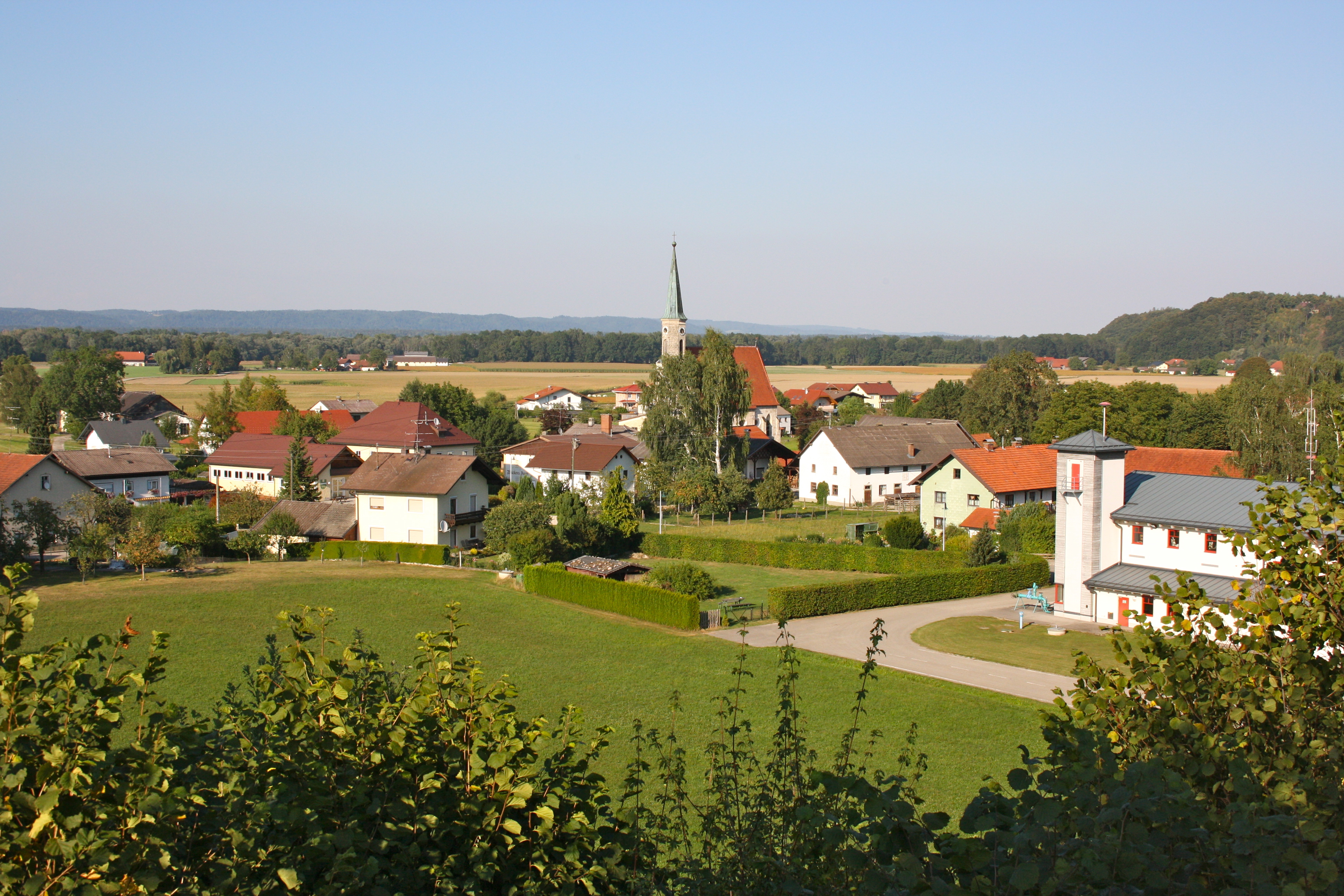

- Coat of arms

- Location within Austria
- Coordinates: 48°11′35″N 12°52′36″E
- Country: Austria
- State: Upper Austria
- District: Braunau am Inn

Government
  - Mayor: Huber Michael (ÖVP)

Area
  - Total: 27.1 km^{2} (10.5 sq mi)
- Elevation: 356 m (1,168 ft)

Population (2016-01-01)
  - Total: 685
  - Density: 25.3/km^{2} (65.5/sq mi)
- Time zone: UTC+1 (CET)
  - Summer (DST): UTC+2 (CEST)
- Postal code: 5123
- Area code: 07727
- Vehicle registration: BR
- Website: www.ueberackern.at

Überackern is a municipality in the district of Braunau am Inn in the Austrian state of Upper Austria.

== Geography ==
Überackern lies in the Innviertel near the confluence of the Salzach and the Inn. It is surrounded by the Weilhart forest. About 77 percent of the municipality is forest and 15 percent farmland.

== Villages ==
Inhabitants as 1 January 2020

- Aufhausen (7)
- Berg (6)
- Kreuzlinden (166)
- Mühltal (93)
- Überackern (249)
- Weng (162)
