= Höhnhart =

- Municipality
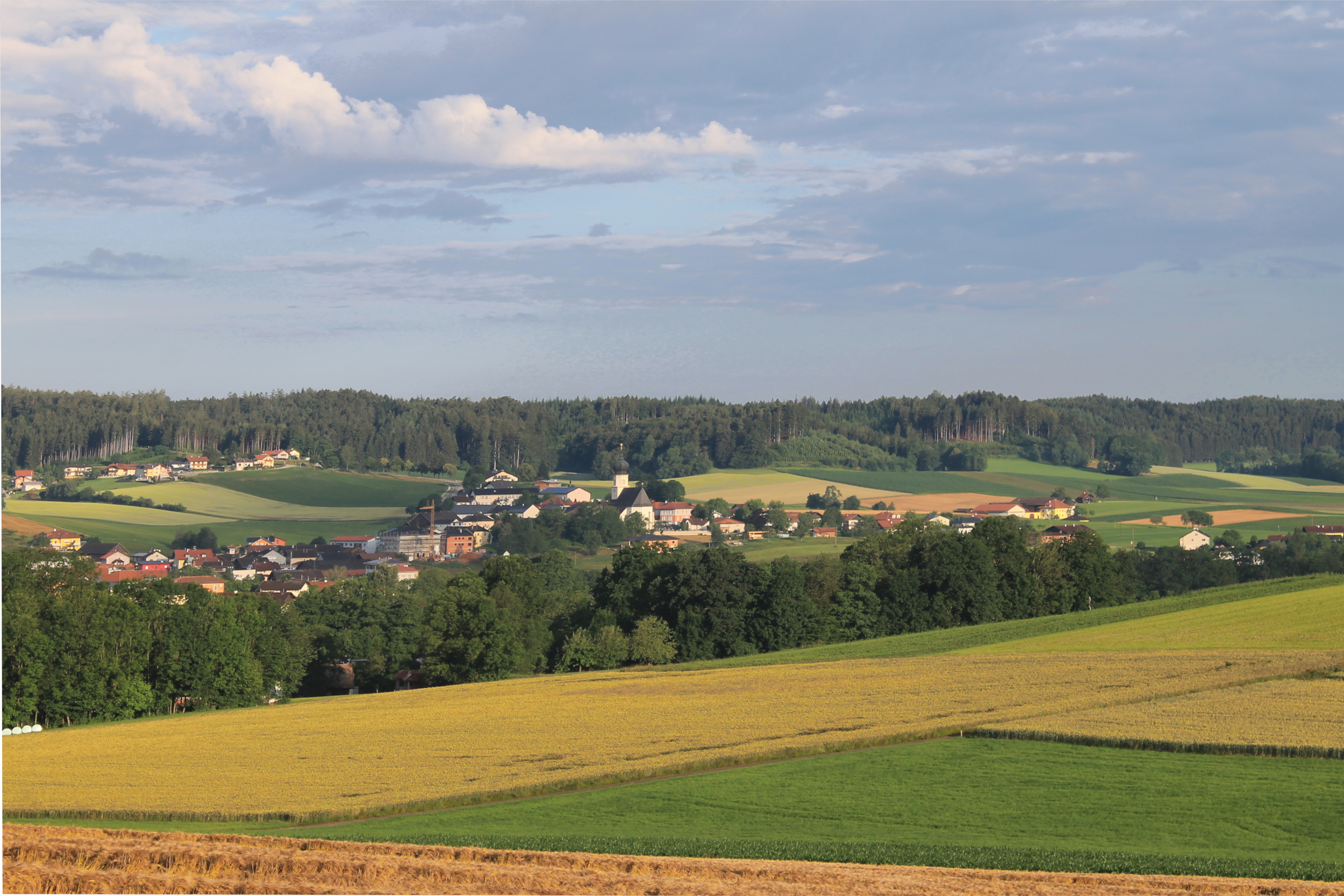
- Höhnhart as seen from the Grindlsberg

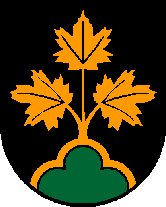
- Coat of arms

- Location within Austria
- Coordinates: 48°09′52″N 13°16′11″E
- Country: Austria
- State: Upper Austria
- District: Braunau am Inn

Government
  - Mayor: Erich Priewasser (ÖVP)

Area
  - Total: 21.97 km^{2} (8.48 sq mi)
- Elevation: 480 m (1,570 ft)

Population (2018-01-01)
  - Total: 1,379
  - Density: 62.77/km^{2} (162.6/sq mi)
- Time zone: UTC+1 (CET)
  - Summer (DST): UTC+2 (CEST)
- Postal code: 5251
- Area code: 07755
- Vehicle registration: BR
- Website: www.hoehnhart.at

Höhnhart is a municipality in the district of Braunau am Inn in the Austrian state of Upper Austria.

== Geography ==
Höhnart lies in the Innviertel southeast of Braunau am Inn. About 29 percent of the municipality is forest and 63 percent farmland.
