= Perwang am Grabensee =

- Municipality
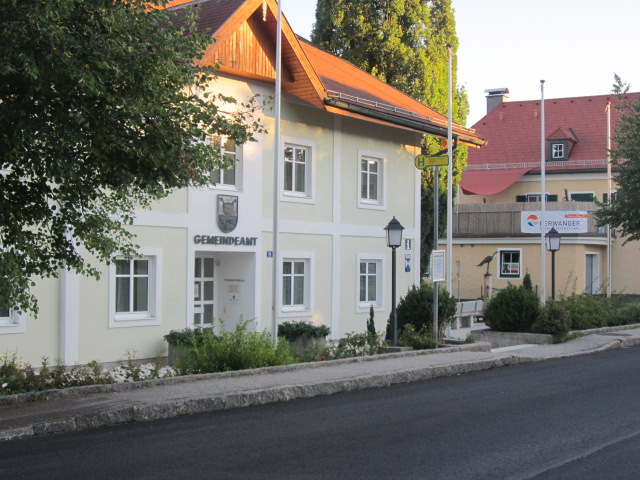
- Town hall

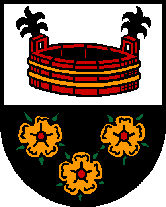
- Coat of arms

- Location within Austria
- Coordinates: 48°00′20″N 13°05′00″E
- Country: Austria
- State: Upper Austria
- District: Braunau am Inn

Government
  - Mayor: Josef Sulzberger (ÖVP)

Area
  - Total: 6.83 km^{2} (2.64 sq mi)
- Elevation: 531 m (1,742 ft)

Population (2018-01-01)
  - Total: 997
  - Density: 146/km^{2} (378/sq mi)
- Time zone: UTC+1 (CET)
  - Summer (DST): UTC+2 (CEST)
- Postal code: 5166
- Area code: 06217
- Vehicle registration: BR
- Website: www.netvillage.at/ perwang_am_grabensee.htd

Perwang am Grabensee is a municipality in the district of Braunau am Inn in the Austrian state of Upper Austria.

== Geography ==
Perwang lies on the Grabensee in the Innviertel. About 20 percent of the municipality is forest and 70 percent farmland.
