= Braunau District =

Coordinates: 48.131°N 13.109°E

Braunau District Bezirk Braunau
- District
- Country: Austria
- State: Upper Austria
- Number of municipalities: 46
- Administrative seat: Braunau am Inn

Government
  - District Governor: Gerald Kronberger

Area
  - Total: 1,040.38 km^{2} (401.69 sq mi)

Population (2026)
  - Total: 110,529
  - Density: 106.239/km^{2} (275.158/sq mi)
- Time zone: UTC+01:00 (CET)
  - Summer (DST): UTC+02:00 (CEST)
- Vehicle registration: BR

Bezirk Braunau is a district of the state of Upper Austria in Austria.

== History ==
During the Bavarian uprising of 1705 and 1706 the country defense congress ("Braunau Parliament") was held in Braunau. In addition to leader Johann Georg Meindl, born in Weng, Christian Probst wrote of other leaders from the court of Braunau: old Hofbauer from Wuerlach, the rotbartete Schwaiger, Schienkhueber zu Mitterndorf, Neuhauser zu Hochburg, Meindlsberger in office at Eggelsberg, the innkeeper of Ibm and Baron of Taufkirchen, who was a civil servant there.

The district was created in 1868 during the Kingdom of Bohemia.

Franz Xaver Gruber composer of the Christmas carol "Stille Nacht" ("Silent Night") was born in the district in 1787. Adolf Hitler was born in the administrative seat Braunau on 20 April 1889.

== Memorial blocks ==
The Cologne artist Gunter Demnig laid 13 Stolperstein memorial blocks for victims of National Socialism in the district of Braunau am Inn. The former "home district of the Führer" was the first district or county in German-speaking Europe to memorialize Nazi victims in this form and on this scale. Gunter Demnig has placed over 20,000 paving stones with the inscription "Hier wohnte" (German for "here lived") in front of the houses of Nazi victims since 1997. However, this occurred mostly in cities and in rural communities the practice remained the exception.

== Municipalities ==
The district of Braunau am Inn is divided into 46 municipalities, including three towns (Städte) (indicated in bold) and five market towns (Marktgemeiden) (indicated in italics)

Suburbs, hamlets and other subdivisions of a municipality are indicated in small characters.

- **Altheim**
- Aspach
- Auerbach
- **Braunau am Inn**
- Burgkirchen
- Eggelsberg
- Feldkirchen bei Mattighofen
- Franking
- Geretsberg
- Gilgenberg am Weilhart
- Haigermoos
- Handenberg
- Helpfau-Uttendorf
- Hochburg-Ach
- Höhnhart
- Jeging
- Kirchberg bei Mattighofen
- Lengau
- Lochen am See
- Maria Schmolln
- **Mattighofen**
- Mauerkirchen
- Mining
- Moosbach
- Moosdorf
- Munderfing
- Neukirchen an der Enknach
- Ostermiething
- Palting
- Perwang am Grabensee
- Pfaffstätt
- Pischelsdorf am Engelbach
- Polling im Innkreis
- Roßbach
- St. Georgen am Fillmannsbach
- St. Johann am Walde
- St. Pantaleon
- St. Peter am Hart
- St. Radegund
- St. Veit im Innkreis
- Schalchen
- Schwand im Innkreis
- Tarsdorf
- Treubach
- Überackern
- Weng im Innkreis
