= Lochen am See =

- Municipality
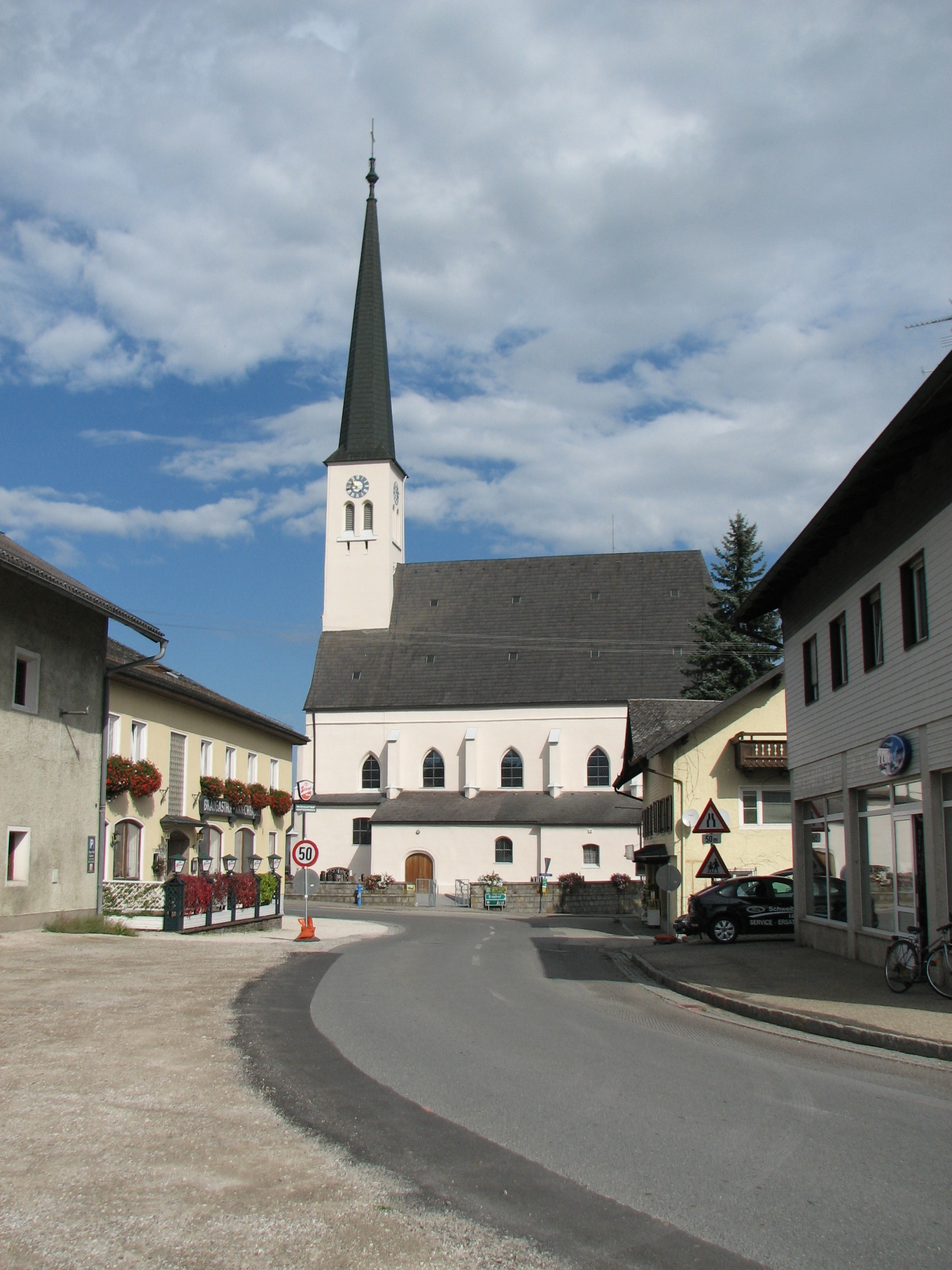

- Coat of arms

- Location within Austria
- Coordinates: 48°2′00″N 13°11′00″E
- Country: Austria
- State: Upper Austria
- District: Braunau am Inn

Government
  - Mayor: Fred Scheer (SPÖ)

Area
  - Total: 33.3 km^{2} (12.9 sq mi)
- Elevation: 516 m (1,693 ft)

Population (2018-01-01)
  - Total: 2,754
  - Density: 82.7/km^{2} (214/sq mi)
- Time zone: UTC+1 (CET)
  - Summer (DST): UTC+2 (CEST)
- Postal code: 5221
- Area code: +43 7745
- Vehicle registration: BR
- Website: www.lochen.at

Lochen am See is a municipality in the district of Braunau in the Austrian state of Upper Austria close to the border with Salzburg.

== Geography ==
Lochen lies on the Mattsee on a high plateau at the foot of the Tannberg.

== See also ==
Salzburger Seengebiet
