= Palting =

- Municipality
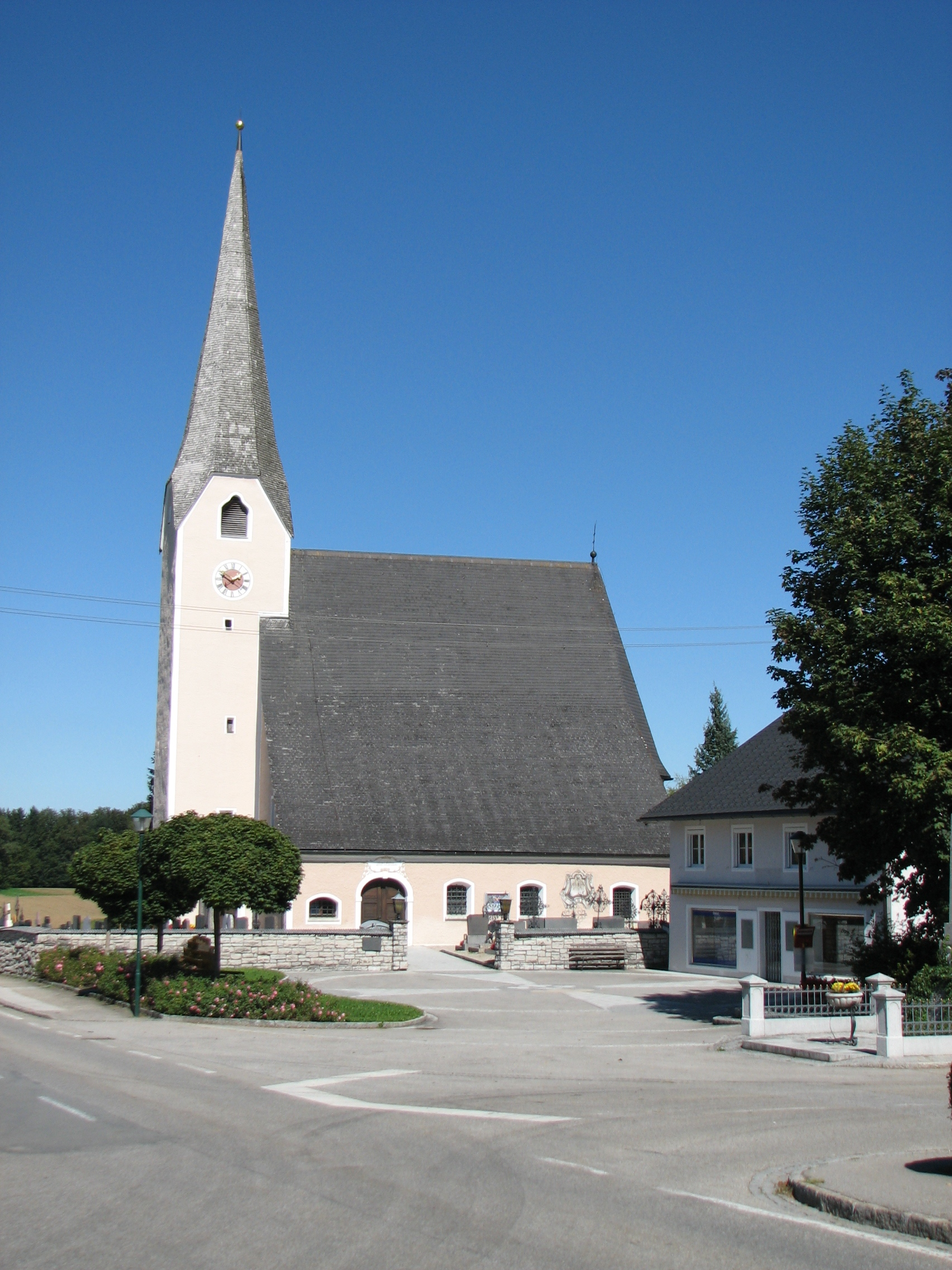

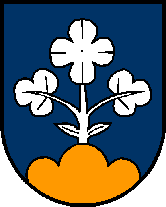
- Coat of arms

- Location within Austria
- Coordinates: 48°01′00″N 13°07′40″E
- Country: Austria
- State: Upper Austria
- District: Braunau am Inn

Government
  - Mayor: Franz Stockinger (ÖVP)

Area
  - Total: 11.51 km^{2} (4.44 sq mi)
- Elevation: 514 m (1,686 ft)

Population (2018-01-01)
  - Total: 938
  - Density: 81.5/km^{2} (211/sq mi)
- Time zone: UTC+1 (CET)
  - Summer (DST): UTC+2 (CEST)
- Postal code: 5163
- Area code: 06217
- Vehicle registration: BR
- Website: www.oberoesterreich.at/ palting

Palting is a municipality in the district of Braunau am Inn in the Austrian state of Upper Austria.

== Geography ==
Palting lies in the Innviertel. About 18 percent of the municipality is forest and 75 percent farmland.
