= St. Johann am Walde =

- Municipality
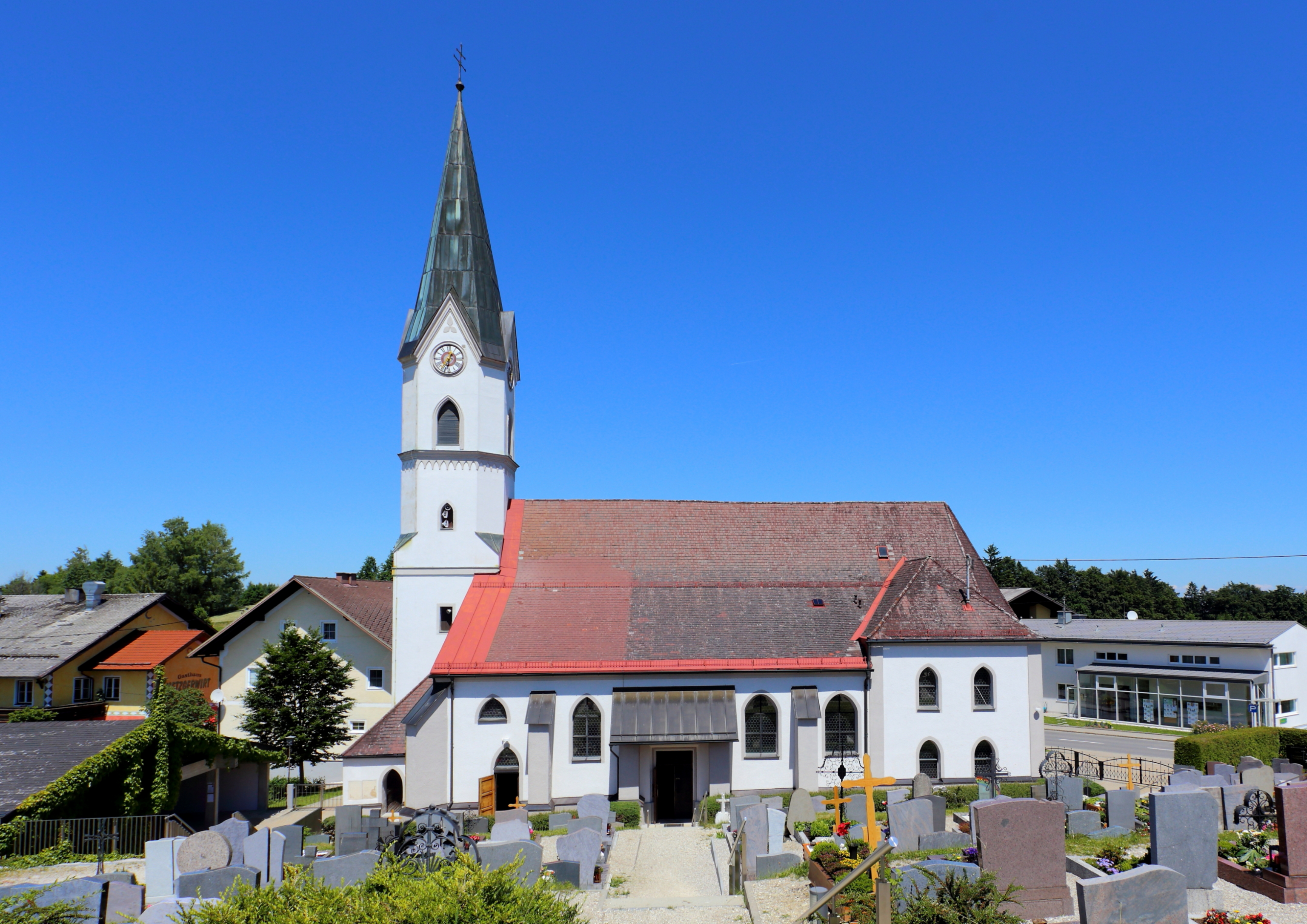

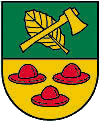
- Coat of arms

- Location within Austria
- Coordinates: 48°07′00″N 13°16′00″E
- Country: Austria
- State: Upper Austria
- District: Braunau

Government
  - Mayor: Gerhard Berger (SPÖ)

Area
  - Total: 39.99 km^{2} (15.44 sq mi)
- Elevation: 623 m (2,044 ft)

Population (2018-01-01)
  - Total: 2,051
  - Density: 51.29/km^{2} (132.8/sq mi)
- Time zone: UTC+1 (CET)
  - Summer (DST): UTC+2 (CEST)
- Postal code: 5242
- Area code: +43 7743
- Vehicle registration: BR
- Website: www.saigahans.at

St. Johann am Walde is a municipality in the district of Braunau in the Austrian state of Upper Austria.

== Geography ==
St. Johann lies in the Innviertel. About 65 percent of the municipality is forest and 32 percent farmland.
