= Gilgenberg am Weilhart =

- Municipality
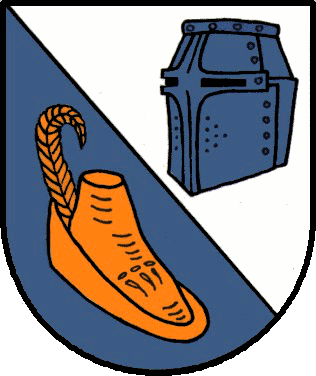
- Coat of arms

- Location within Austria
- Coordinates: 48°07′54″N 12°56′21″E
- Country: Austria
- State: Upper Austria
- District: Braunau am Inn

Government
  - Mayor: Franz Pemwieser (FWP)

Area
  - Total: 26.58 km^{2} (10.26 sq mi)
- Elevation: 466 m (1,529 ft)

Population (2018-01-01)
  - Total: 1,327
  - Density: 49.92/km^{2} (129.3/sq mi)
- Time zone: UTC+1 (CET)
  - Summer (DST): UTC+2 (CEST)
- Postal code: 5133
- Area code: 07728
- Vehicle registration: BR
- Website: www.gilgenberg.at

Gilgenberg am Weilhart is a municipality in the district of Braunau am Inn in the Austrian state of Upper Austria.

== Geography ==
Gilgenberg lies in the Innviertel. About 18 percent of the municipality is forest and 77 percent farmland.

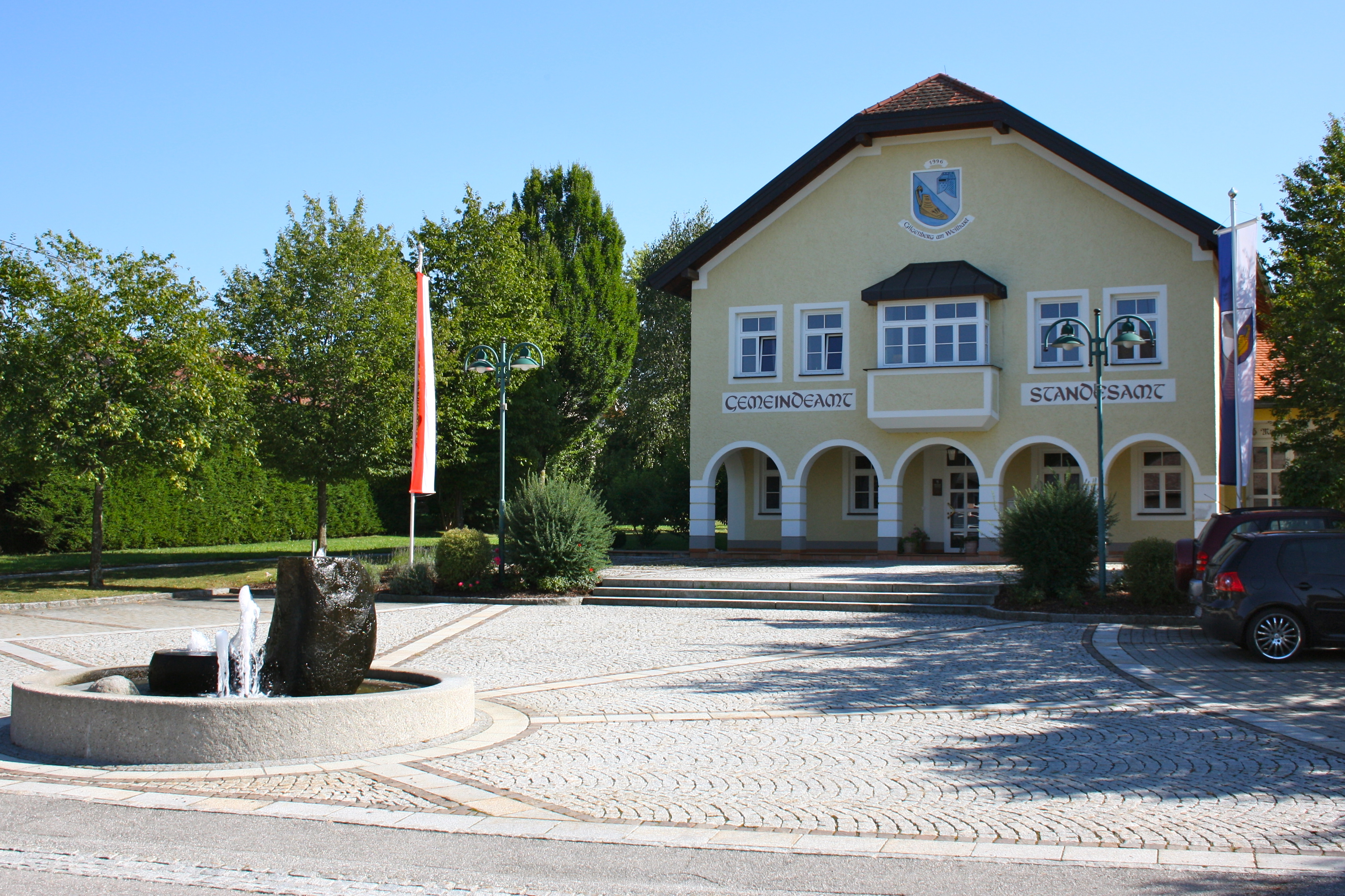
Municipal office of Gilgenberg am Weilhart
