= Burgkirche =

Burgkirche refers in German to a church belonging to a castle complex.

Churches named Burgkirche include:

- Burgkirche, Bad Dürkheim
- Burgkirche, Dreieichenhain
- Burgkirche, Ingelheim
- Burgkirche, Königsberg
- Burgkirche, Lübeck
- Burgkirche, Maienfels
- Burgkirche, Posterstein
- Burgkirche, Schöllang

== See also ==
- Burgkirchen (disambiguation)
