= Moosdorf =

- Municipality
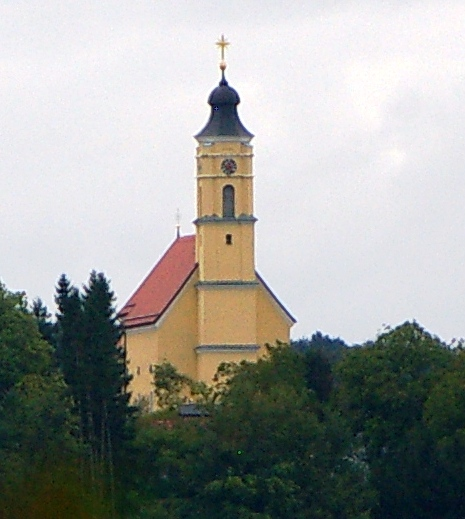

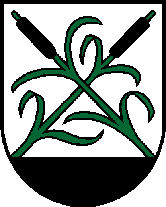
- Coat of arms

- Location within Austria
- Coordinates: 48°02′40″N 12°59′20″E
- Country: Austria
- State: Upper Austria
- District: Braunau am Inn

Government
  - Mayor: Manfred Emersberger (SPÖ)

Area
  - Total: 15.7 km^{2} (6.1 sq mi)
- Elevation: 488 m (1,601 ft)

Population (2018-01-01)
  - Total: 1,638
  - Density: 104/km^{2} (270/sq mi)
- Time zone: UTC+1 (CET)
  - Summer (DST): UTC+2 (CEST)
- Postal code: 5141
- Area code: 07748
- Vehicle registration: BR
- Website: www.moosdorf.ooe.gv.at

Moosdorf is a municipality in the district of Braunau am Inn in the region of Innviertel within the Austrian state of Upper Austria. It had a population of 1,684 as at 1 January 2019.

The name Moosdorf (lit.: "moss village") relates to its proximity to the Ibmer Moor, the largest bog complex in Austria and the easternmost of all pre-Alpine bogs. Moos is Upper German for "moor" or "bog".

== Subdivisions ==
The municipality incorporates the following 15 villages and hamlets (with population in brackets as at 1 Jan 2019):

- Einsperg (89)
- Elling (161)
- Furkern (43)
- Habersdorf (55)
- Hackenbuch (336)
- Haslach (33)
- Jedendorf (91)
- Kimmelsdorf (204)
- Moosdorf (487)
- Moosmühl (29)
- Mühlbach (38)
- Puttenhausen (18)
- Seeleiten (25)
- Stadl (34)
- Weichsee (41)

The municipality consists of the cadastral municipalities of Moosdorf and Stadl.
