= Moosbach, Austria =

Moosbach
- Municipality
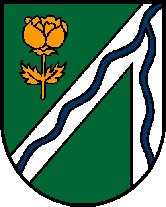
- Coat of arms

- Location within Austria
- Coordinates: 48°12′20″N 13°09′50″E
- Country: Austria
- State: Upper Austria
- District: Braunau am Inn

Government
  - Mayor: Johann Scharf (FPÖ)

Area
  - Total: 19.1 km^{2} (7.4 sq mi)
- Elevation: 403 m (1,322 ft)

Population (2018-01-01)
  - Total: 1,042
  - Density: 54.6/km^{2} (141/sq mi)
- Time zone: UTC+1 (CET)
  - Summer (DST): UTC+2 (CEST)
- Postal code: 5271, 4952 (Weng i.I.), 5272 (Treubach)
- Area code: 07724
- Vehicle registration: BR
- Website: www.moosbach.at

Moosbach (German pronunciation: [ˈmoːsbax]) is a municipality in the Braunau am Inn in the Austrian state of Upper Austria.

== Geography ==
Moosbach lies 25 km west of Ried im Innkreis and 10 km southeast of Braunau am Inn between the Inn valley on the north, the Mattig on the west, and the Kobernauß forest on the south.
