= Weng im Innkreis =

- Municipality
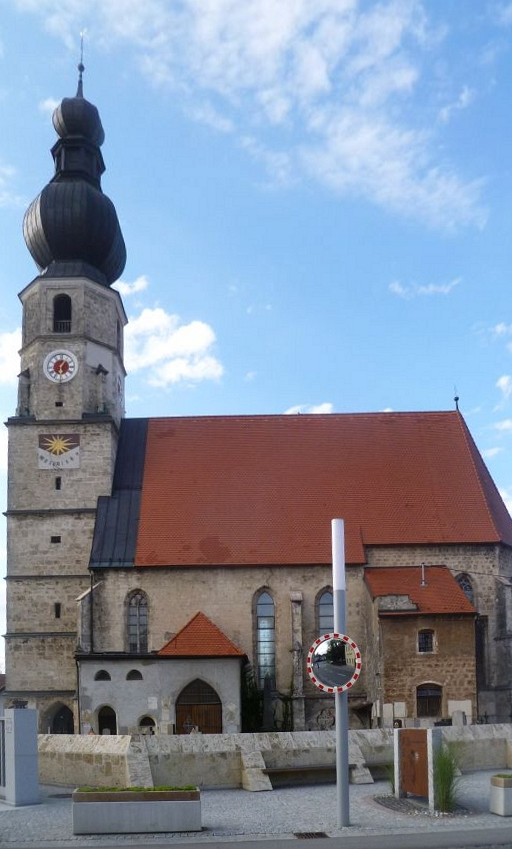

- Coat of arms

- Location within Austria
- Coordinates: 48°14′09″N 13°10′47″E
- Country: Austria
- State: Upper Austria
- District: Braunau am Inn

Government
  - Mayor: Josef Moser (ÖVP)

Area
  - Total: 21.36 km^{2} (8.25 sq mi)
- Elevation: 370 m (1,210 ft)

Population (2018-01-01)
  - Total: 1,394
  - Density: 65.26/km^{2} (169.0/sq mi)
- Time zone: UTC+1 (CET)
  - Summer (DST): UTC+2 (CEST)
- Postal code: 4952 (Weng im Innkreis), 4950 (Altheim), 4961 (Mühlheim am Inn)
- Area code: 07723
- Vehicle registration: BR
- Website: www.weng-innkreis.at

Weng im Innkreis is a municipality in the district of Braunau am Inn in the Austrian state of Upper Austria.

== Geography ==
Weng lies on the western edge of the Innviertel hills. About 8 percent of the municipality is forest and 83 percent farmland.
