= St. Veit im Innkreis =

- Municipality
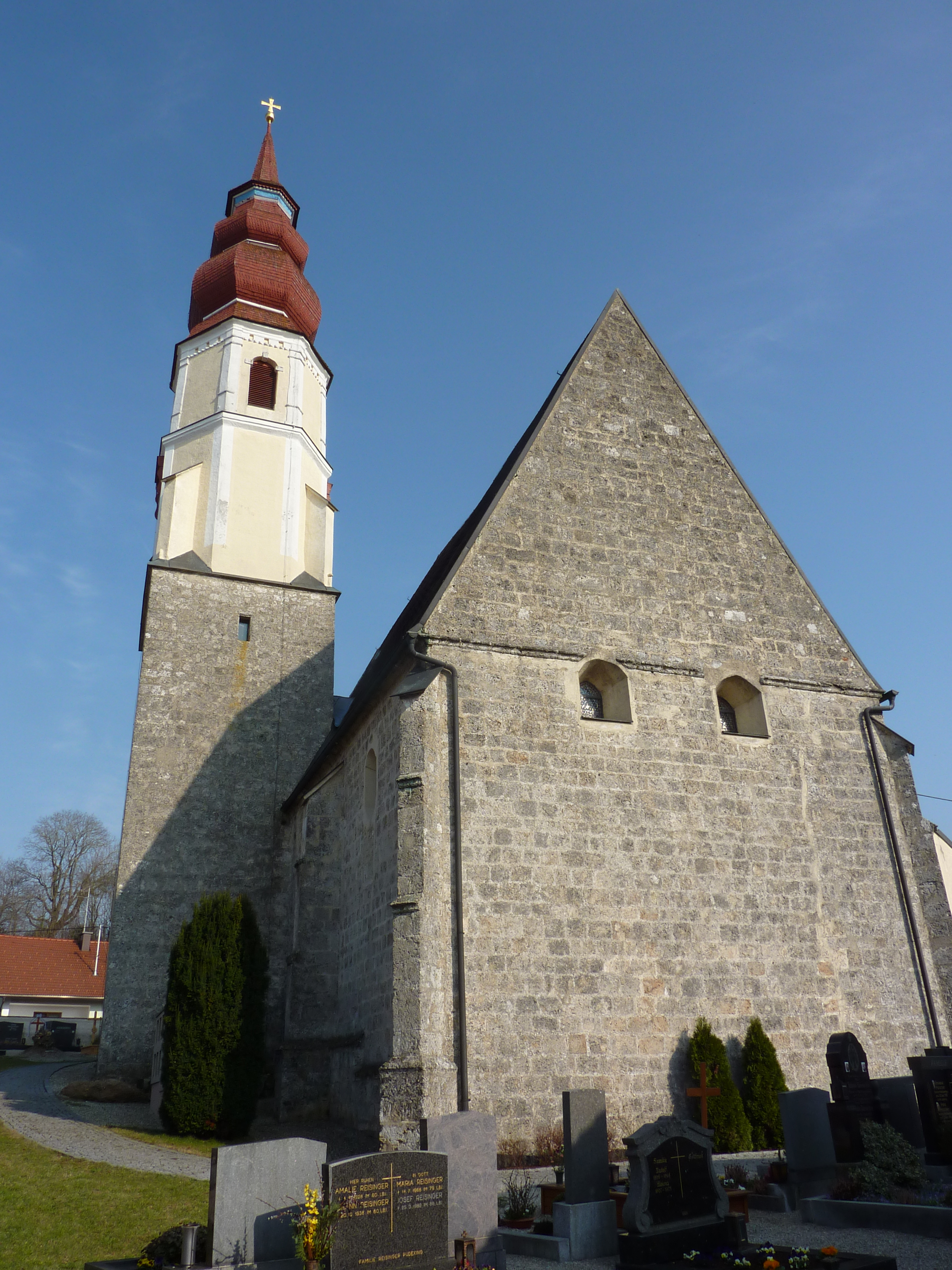

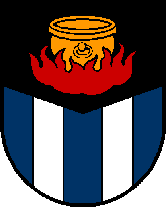
- Coat of arms

- Location within Austria
- Coordinates: 48°12′33″N 13°16′32″E
- Country: Austria
- State: Upper Austria
- District: Braunau

Government
  - Mayor: Manfred Feichtinger (SPÖ)

Area
  - Total: 5.39 km^{2} (2.08 sq mi)
- Elevation: 411 m (1,348 ft)

Population (2018-01-01)
  - Total: 408
  - Density: 75.7/km^{2} (196/sq mi)
- Time zone: UTC+1 (CET)
  - Summer (DST): UTC+2 (CEST)
- Postal code: 5273
- Area code: +43 7723
- Vehicle registration: BR
- Website: www.st-veit-innkreis.at

St. Veit im Innkreis is a municipality in the district of Braunau in the Austrian state of Upper Austria.

== Geography ==
St. Veit lies in the Innviertel. About 9 percent of the municipality is forest, while 85 percent is farmland.
