= Mining, Austria =

Mining
- Municipality
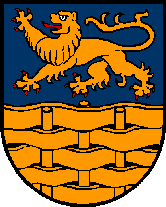
- Coat of arms

- Location within Austria
- Coordinates: 48°16′40″N 13°09′40″E
- Country: Austria
- State: Upper Austria
- District: Braunau am Inn

Government
  - Mayor: Günter Hasiweder (ÖVP)

Area
  - Total: 16.58 km^{2} (6.40 sq mi)
- Elevation: 346 m (1,135 ft)

Population (2018-01-01)
  - Total: 1,195
  - Density: 72.07/km^{2} (186.7/sq mi)
- Time zone: UTC+1 (CET)
  - Summer (DST): UTC+2 (CEST)
- Postal code: 4962
- Area code: 07723
- Vehicle registration: BR
- Website: www.mining.ooe.gv.at

Mining (German pronunciation: [ˈmiːnɪŋ], as in mean-ing, not as in mining) is a municipality in the district of Braunau am Inn in the Austrian state of Upper Austria.
