= Handenberg =

- Municipality
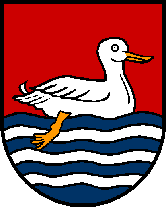
- Coat of arms

- Location within Austria
- Coordinates: 48°08′00″N 13°00′30″E
- Country: Austria
- State: Upper Austria
- District: Braunau am Inn

Government
  - Mayor: Gottfried Neumaier (ÖVP)

Area
  - Total: 27.64 km^{2} (10.67 sq mi)
- Elevation: 497 m (1,631 ft)

Population (2018-01-01)
  - Total: 1,290
  - Density: 46.7/km^{2} (121/sq mi)
- Time zone: UTC+1 (CET)
  - Summer (DST): UTC+2 (CEST)
- Postal code: 5144
- Area code: 07748
- Vehicle registration: BR
- Website: www.handenberg.ooe.gv.at

Handenberg is an Austrian municipality in the district of Braunau am Inn in the Austrian state of Upper Austria.

== Geography ==
The Fillmannsbach flows through the municipality from south to north.

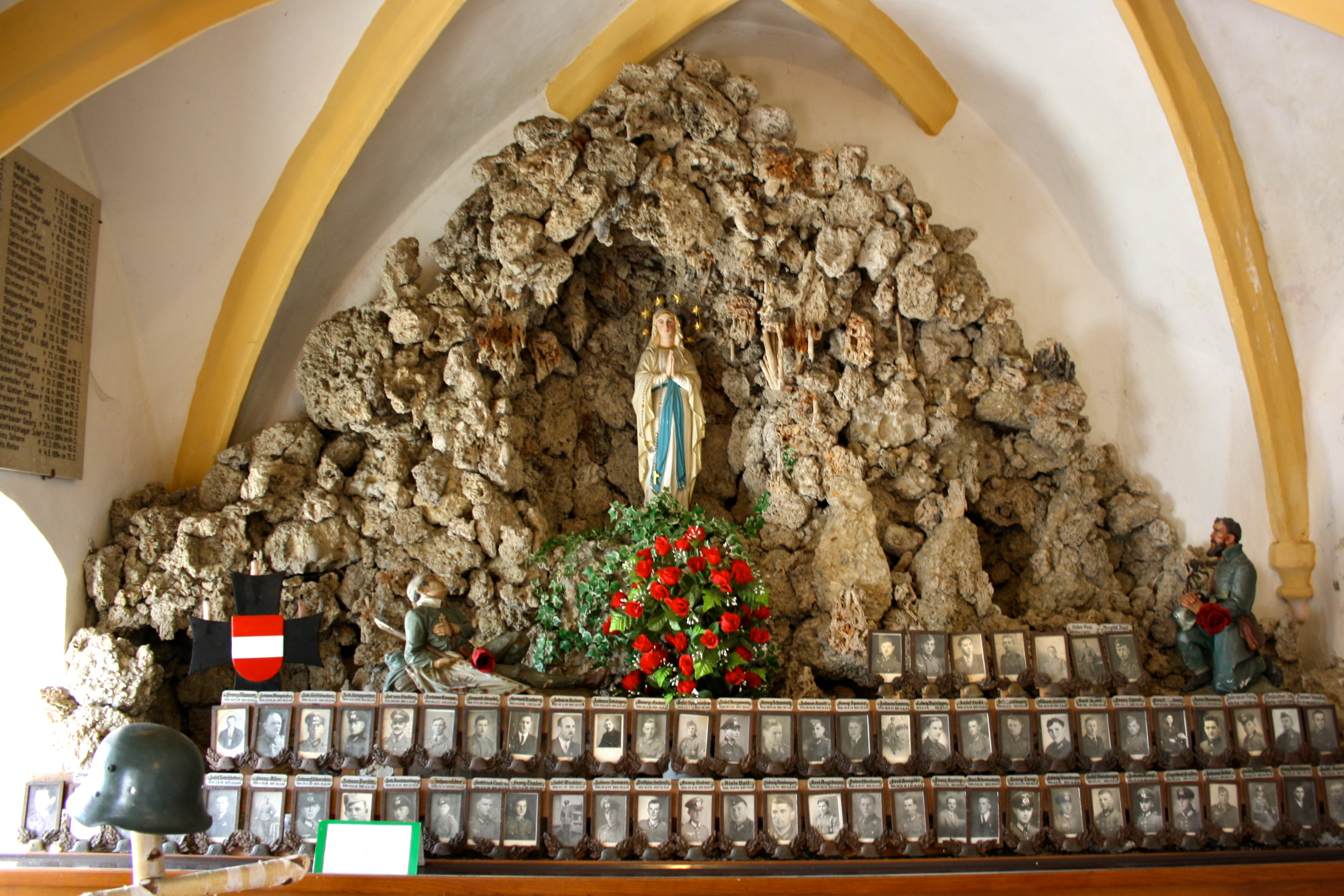
Lourdes Grotto in Handenberg
