= Aspach, Upper Austria =

Aspach
- Municipality
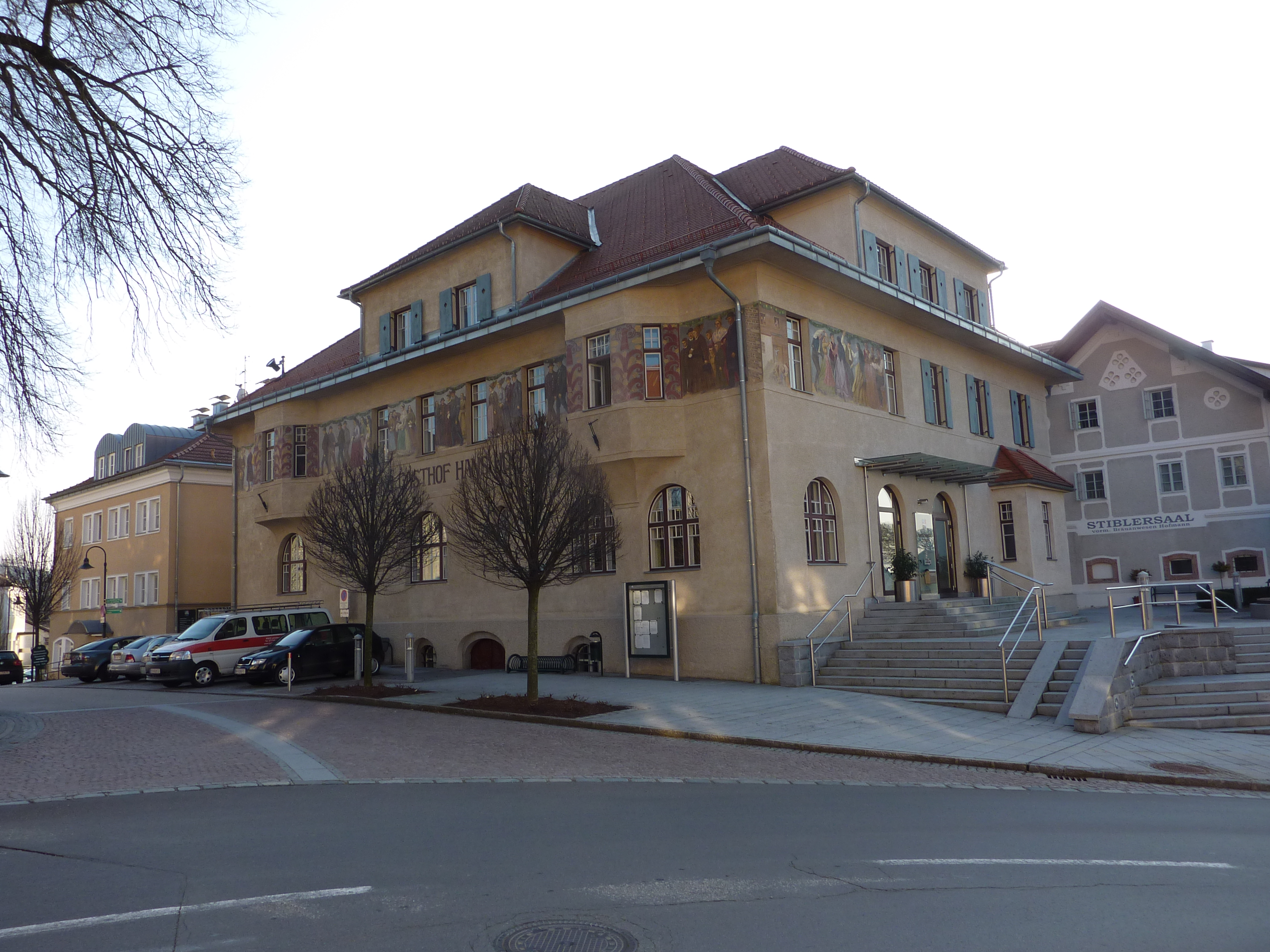
- Aspach town hall

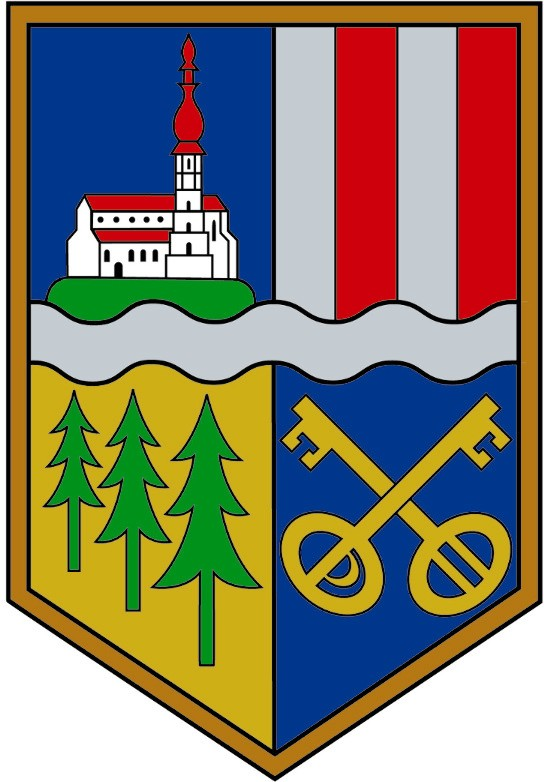
- Coat of arms

- Location within Austria
- Coordinates: 48°11′10″N 13°18′20″E
- Country: Austria
- State: Upper Austria
- District: Braunau am Inn

Government
  - Mayor: Georg Gattringer (ÖVP)

Area
  - Total: 31.46 km^{2} (12.15 sq mi)
- Elevation: 443 m (1,453 ft)

Population (2018-01-01)
  - Total: 2,596
  - Density: 82.52/km^{2} (213.7/sq mi)
- Time zone: UTC+1 (CET)
  - Summer (DST): UTC+2 (CEST)
- Postal code: 5252 Aspach; 4933 Wildenau; 5251 Höhnhart; 4931 Mettmach; 4932 Kirchheim im Innkreis
- Area code: 07755
- Vehicle registration: BR
- Website: www.aspach.at

Aspach (German pronunciation: [ˈaspax]) is a municipality in the district Braunau am Inn in the Austrian state of Upper Austria.

== Villages ==
(Inhabitants as 1 January 2020)

- Aichet (15)
- Aspach (871)
- Au (90)
- Baumgarten (32)
- Buchleiting (19)
- Döging (18)
- Dötting (19)
- Ecking (8)
- Eigelsberg (34)
- Eisecking (16)
- Englham (25)
- Hinterholz (128)
- Hobling (18)
- Kappeln (32)
- Kasing (40)
- Kasting (42)
- Katzlberg (8)
- Kleinschneidt (53)
- Leithen (29)
- Leithen am Walde (30)
- Maierhof (24)
- Migelsbach (74)
- Mitterberg (11)
- Naderling (9)
- Niederham (6)
- Offenschwandt (23)
- Parz (1)
- Pimberg (34)
- Ried (19)
- Roith (36)
- Rottersham (14)
- Steinberg (42)
- Teinsberg (11)
- Thal (14)
- Wasserdobl (38)
- Weißau (11)
- Wieselberg (26)
- Wildenau (693)

== See also ==
- Linz
- Upper Austria
