= Jeging =

- Municipality
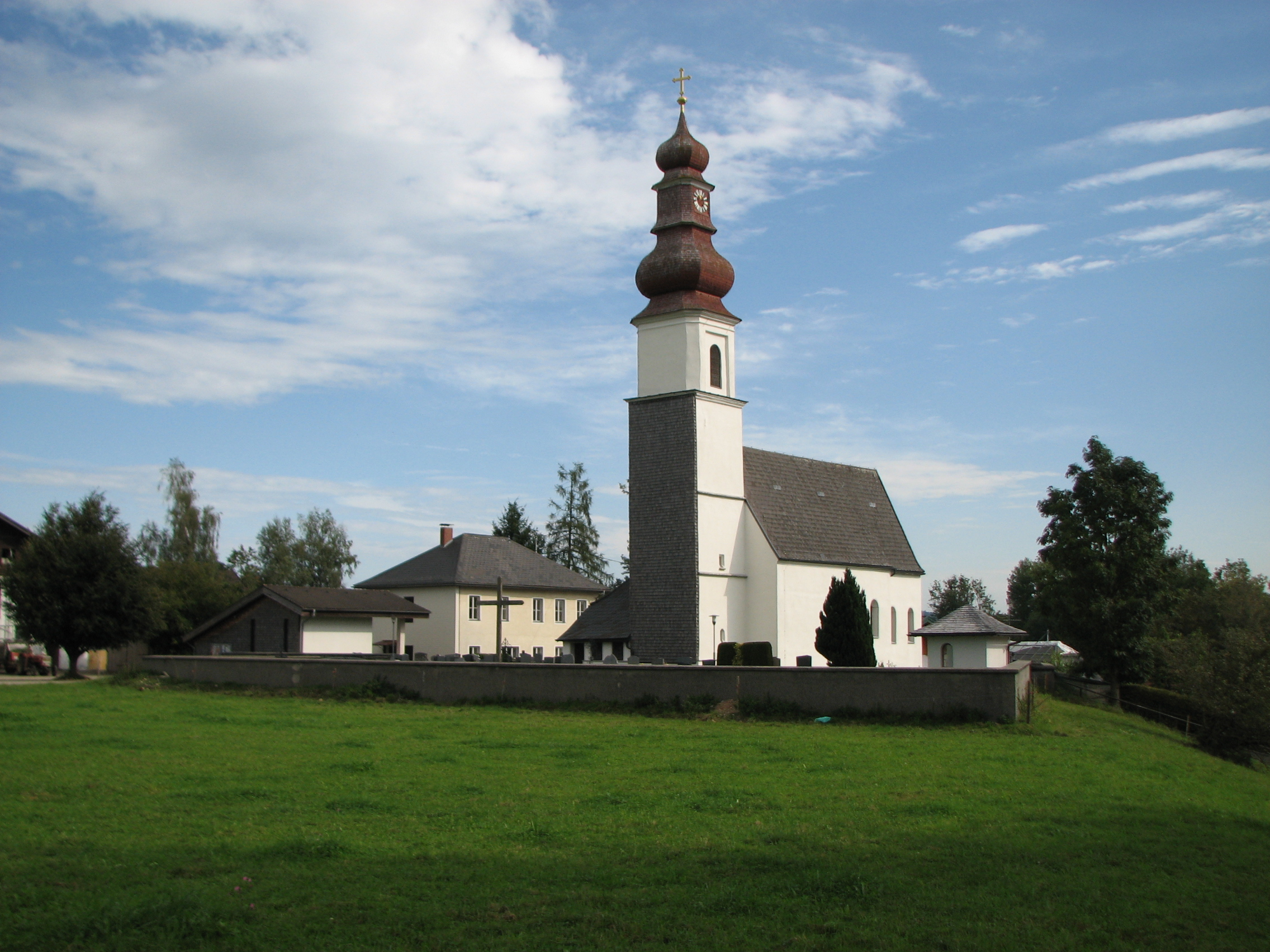

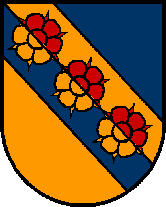
- Coat of arms

- Location within Austria
- Coordinates: 48°03′00″N 13°09′00″E
- Country: Austria
- State: Upper Austria
- District: Braunau am Inn

Government
  - Mayor: Ursula Lindenhofer (SPÖ)

Area
  - Total: 6.58 km^{2} (2.54 sq mi)
- Elevation: 486 m (1,594 ft)

Population (2018-01-01)
  - Total: 691
  - Density: 105/km^{2} (272/sq mi)
- Time zone: UTC+1 (CET)
  - Summer (DST): UTC+2 (CEST)
- Postal code: 5225
- Area code: 07744
- Vehicle registration: BR
- Website: www.oberoesterreich. at/jeging

Jeging is a municipality in the district of Braunau am Inn in the Austrian state of Upper Austria.
