= Pfaffstätt =

- Municipality
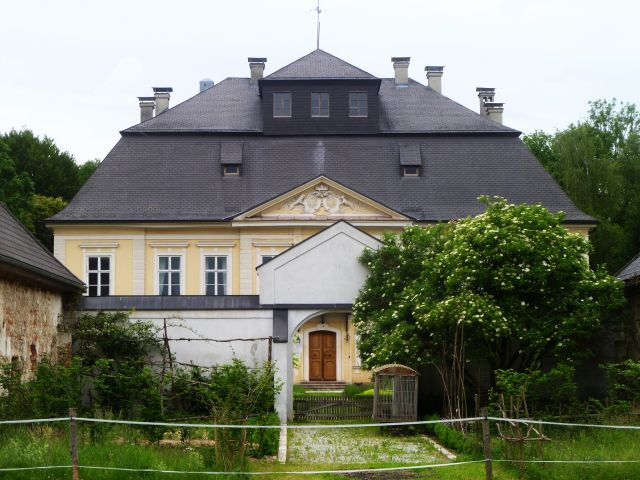
- Pfaffstätt palace

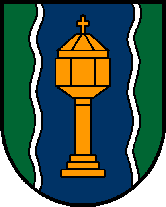
- Coat of arms

- Location within Austria
- Coordinates: 48°04′30″N 13°08′40″E
- Country: Austria
- State: Upper Austria
- District: Braunau am Inn

Government
  - Mayor: Wolfgang Gerner (ÖVP)

Area
  - Total: 9.2 km^{2} (3.6 sq mi)
- Elevation: 471 m (1,545 ft)

Population (2018-01-01)
  - Total: 1,101
  - Density: 120/km^{2} (310/sq mi)
- Time zone: UTC+1 (CET)
  - Summer (DST): UTC+2 (CEST)
- Postal code: 5223
- Area code: 07742
- Vehicle registration: BR
- Website: www.pfaffstaett.ooe.gv.at

Pfaffstätt is a municipality in the district of Braunau am Inn in Austrian state of Upper Austria.

== Geography ==
Pfaffstätt lies in the Innviertel. About 37 percent of the municipality is forest and 57 percent farmland.
