= St. Georgen am Fillmannsbach =

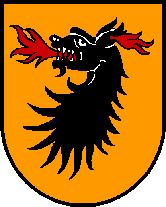
- Coat of arms

- Location within Austria
- Coordinates: 48°07′30″N 13°01′10″E
- Country: Austria
- State: Upper Austria
- District: Braunau

Government
  - Mayor: Franz Wengler (FPÖ)

Area
  - Total: 7.21 km^{2} (2.78 sq mi)
- Elevation: 488 m (1,601 ft)

Population (2018-01-01)
  - Total: 404
  - Density: 56.0/km^{2} (145/sq mi)
- Time zone: UTC+1 (CET)
  - Summer (DST): UTC+2 (CEST)
- Postal code: 5144
- Area code: 07748
- Vehicle registration: BR
- Website: www.oberoesterreich.at/ st.georgen.fillmannsbach

St. Georgen am Fillmannsbach is a municipality in the district of Braunau in the Austrian state of Upper Austria.

== Geography ==
St. Georgen lies in the Innviertel. About 21 percent of the municipality is forest and 75 percent farmland.

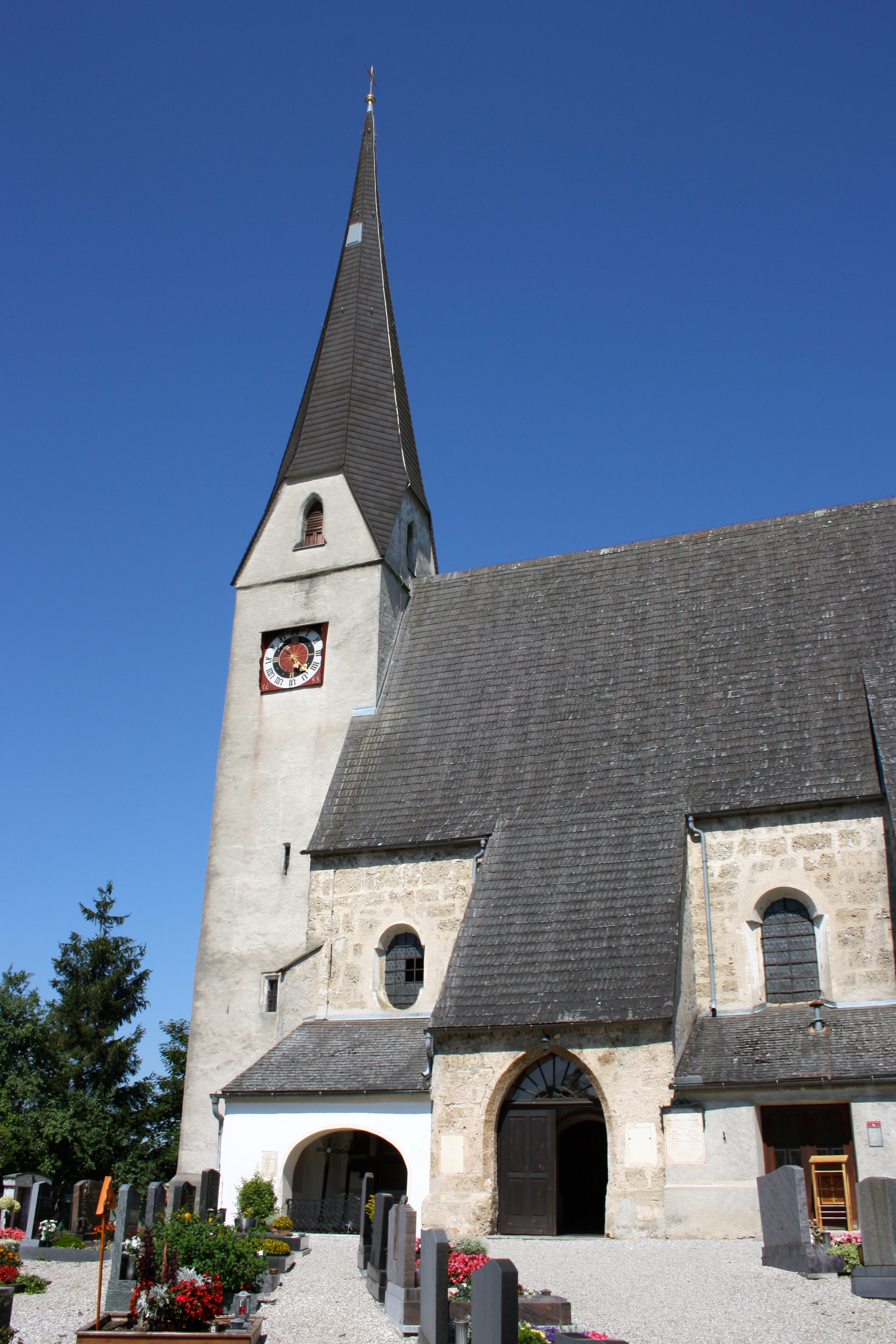
Parish church of St. Georgen am Fillmannsbach
