= Helpfau-Uttendorf =

- Municipality
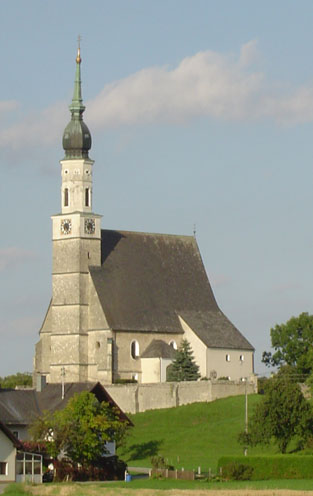

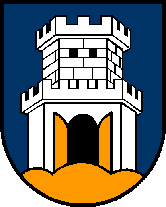
- Coat of arms

- Location within Austria
- Coordinates: 48°09′20″N 13°07′05″E
- Country: Austria
- State: Upper Austria
- District: Braunau am Inn

Government
  - Mayor: Josef Johann Leimer (ÖVP)

Area
  - Total: 26.38 km^{2} (10.19 sq mi)
- Elevation: 419 m (1,375 ft)

Population (2018-01-01)
  - Total: 3,573
  - Density: 135.4/km^{2} (350.8/sq mi)
- Time zone: UTC+1 (CET)
  - Summer (DST): UTC+2 (CEST)
- Postal code: 5261
- Area code: 07724
- Vehicle registration: BR
- Website: www.helpfau-uttendorf.at

Helpfau-Uttendorf is a municipality in the district of Braunau am Inn in the Austrian state of Upper Austria.

== Geography ==
About 26 percent of the municipality is forest and 62 percent farmland.
