= Maria Schmolln =

- Municipality
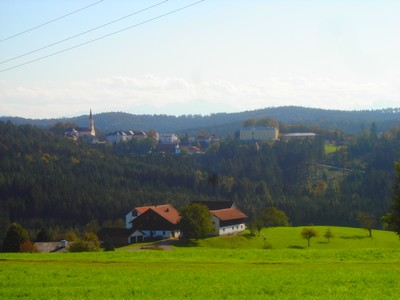

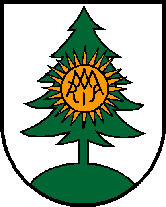
- Coat of arms

- Location within Austria
- Coordinates: 48°08′00″N 13°13′00″E
- Country: Austria
- State: Upper Austria
- District: Braunau am Inn

Government
  - Mayor: Norbert Heller (ÖVP)

Area
  - Total: 34.5 km^{2} (13.3 sq mi)
- Elevation: 557 m (1,827 ft)

Population (2018-01-01)
  - Total: 1,414
  - Density: 41.0/km^{2} (106/sq mi)
- Time zone: UTC+1 (CET)
  - Summer (DST): UTC+2 (CEST)
- Postal code: 5241
- Area code: 07743
- Vehicle registration: BR
- Website: www.maria-schmolln.at

Maria Schmolln is a municipality in the district of Braunau am Inn of the Austrian state of Upper Austria state. The community is mainly known as an important pilgrimage destination among rural Innviertel. The name comes from its location on the “Schmollner Berg”, literally small mountain.

== Geography ==
Maria Schmolln lies in the south of the Innviertel amid the rolling hills (max height: 767 m - 2,516 ft) covered by the Kobernaußer Forest, which, together with the adjacent Hausruck Forest in Hausruckviertel, is one of the largest contiguous forest in Central Europe. The municipality is structured in the three cadastral entities of Oberminathal, Schnellenberg and Schweigert Reith, and has an extension of 34,47 km^{2} (13,31 sq mi).
Geologically the area is part of the molasse basin that formed, north of the Alps, during the Oligocene and Miocene epochs.

== History ==
The Duchy of Bavaria owned the area until 1780 when the Peace of Teschen awarded the entire Innviertel, then called "Innbaiern", to Austria. For a short period of time, during the Napoleonic Wars, it returned to Bavaria, but in 1814 it was definitively incorporated into Upper Austria. Maria Schmolln didn't exist yet. The community established itself only in the years from 1860 to 1863 by settling around the shrine and growing with it until, by the end of 1898, Maria Schmolln became an independent municipality. After the “Anschluss”, the annexation of Austria to the German Reich on 13 March 1938, the village belonged to the "Upper Danube" entity. However in 1945 at the end of the Second World War, it returned to the Upper Austria state of an independent Austria. In 2006 a Stolperstein was laid down in the sidewalk in front of the door of the last address of the Franciscan Father Ludwig Seraphim Binder, killed by the Nazi regime. Forty more Stolpersteine were placed in the district of Braunau am Inn by Cologne artist Gunter Demnig in memory of victims of the Third Reich.

== The Sanctuary ==
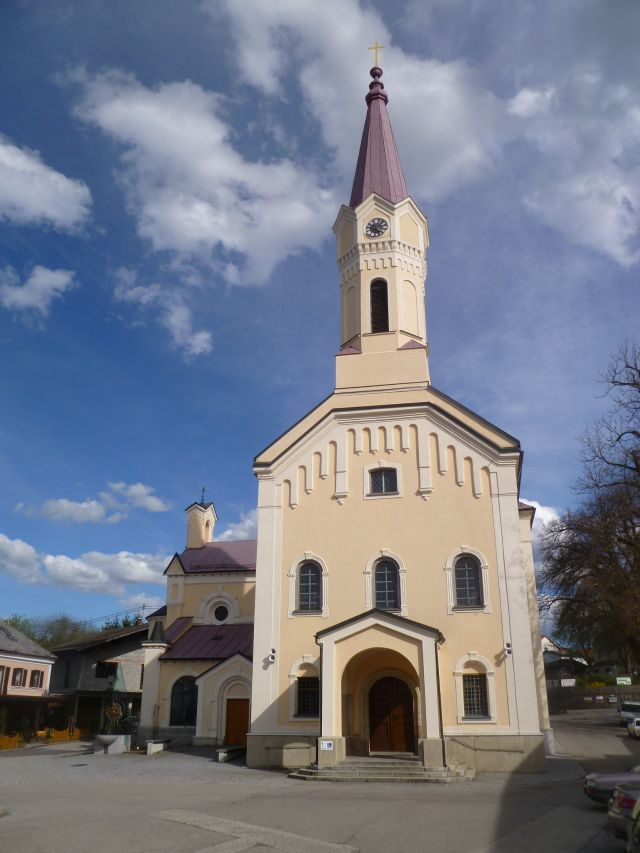
The front of the sanctuary; on the left St. Mary chapel.

According to tradition, all started in 1735 when the farmer Michael Priewasser hung a picture of Saint Mary on a tree in memory of his lost son. This way passers-by would stop and be moved to pray for him. Already in 1784, due to the growing popularity of the place, a wooden chapel was built, and afterward demolished, in 1810, by the order of the authorities. As the image of Saint Virgin Mary kept being worshiped by many, in 1850 a new wooden chapel was built, as well as a shelter for the pilgrims, clearings were made so that people could start settling around the shrine, and so a village was born and continued to grow.

On their own initiative the inhabitants then built the present-day shrine, which, together with a small Franciscan Cloister and the elementary school, was opened in 1863. In 1880 the original wooden chapel was demolished and a chapel, that can be seen today, was built at the northern side of the sanctuary. In 1867 Maria Schmolln became a separate parish as it came to be the most important pilgrimage site in the Innviertel.

The shrine, built in the Romanesque revival style, is 42 meters long and 15 meters wide. The side chapel, where the image of St. Mary is worshiped, was built according to the plans of the artist and Franciscan abbot John Mary Reiter. A glass panel on the floor marks the location of the tree on which the image was originally fixed. In 1962 the rich historicist features of the interior with their polychrome decorations and paintings were removed and replaced with a white finish. Again, in 1992 an extensive renovation and redesign of the interior took place. The new main and side altars were designed and built by the Tyrolean sculptor Rudolf Millonig, as was the new “pilgrims fountain”, built near the side chapel in 2007.

=== The cloister ===
In 1864 the Bishop Franz-Josef Rudigier concerned himself with providing the pilgrims with a due pastoral care, and upon his invitation the first Franciscans from Tyrol moved in. As the pilgrimage site blossomed, in 1871 the original rectory was enlarged to become a cloister hosting ten Franciscans, who not only took care of pilgrims but attended also to the surrounding communities. In 1941 the monastery was closed on Nazi's orders. Only two priests remained, and one part of the building was transformed into a children shelter. In 1945 the cloister was given back its original function, and today a small Franciscan convent continues to serve the chapel.

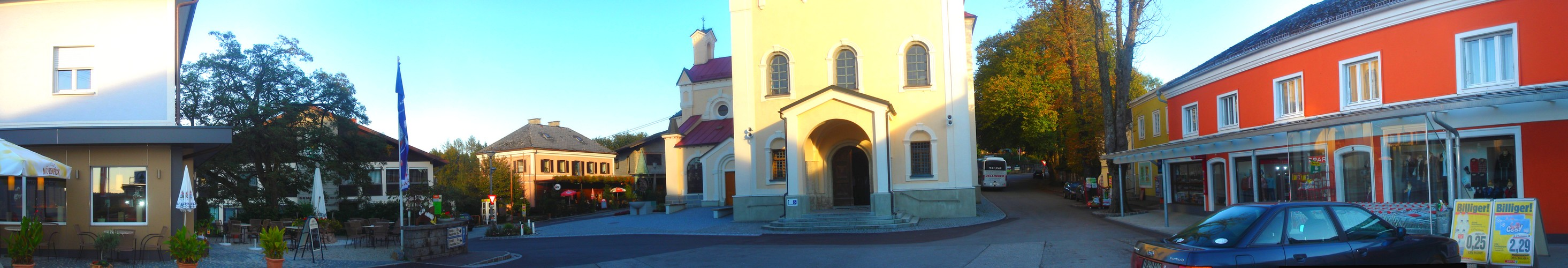

== Community ==
In the local council three parties are represented (2015): ÖVP (11 seats), FPÖ (4 seats), SPÖ (4 seats).

The nursing home " Maria Rast " has been around since 1884 and is operated by the Franciscans nouns of Vöcklabruck. In 2002 the home was extended with a new building on three floors and 80 beds. The old building was renovated and now hosts several sheltered accommodations for vulnerable people.

Over twenty clubs are active in Maria Schmolln, the most important being the beekeeper club, the Music Band, the Theater Group, the Church Choir. The local Union houses and organizes many sport and wellness activities like judo, cross country, downhill skiing / snowboarding, curling, and tennis. There is also a municipal swimming pool and ski lift.
Mountain biking is also a popular activity carried out in the lush wooded area surrounding the village by locals as well as tourists.
There are also more traditional activities: Ländler dance, erection of Maypole, folk, carnival and garden festivals.
The Volunteer fire department manage many different social recreations, like the Forest Festival which falls in the summer months. On December week-ends local associations organize the “Advent Market” on the village streets. On the “Maschkerer” Festival, or the Twelfth Night, which concludes the entire Christmas period, people, lately children in particular, dress up and walk from house to house to entertain with music and songs.

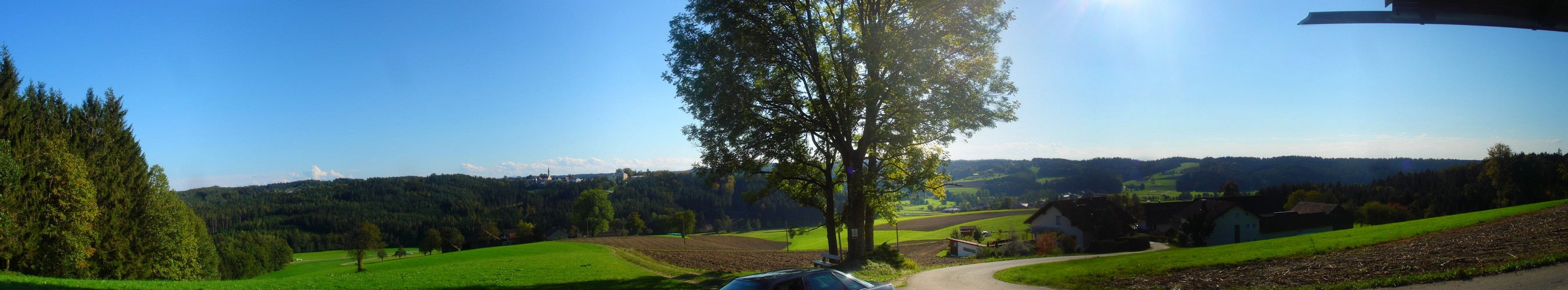

== Notable people ==
- Franciscan Father Ludwig Seraphim Binder, victim of the Nazi regime
- Otto von Habsburg (1912–2011), who became honorary Citizen of Maria Schmolln in 1947
