= Schwand im Innkreis =

- Municipality
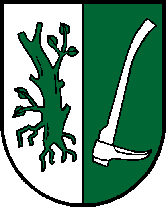
- Coat of arms

- Location within Austria
- Coordinates: 48°10′42″N 12°58′05″E
- Country: Austria
- State: Upper Austria
- District: Braunau am Inn

Government
  - Mayor: Johann Martin Prielhofer (ÖVP)

Area
  - Total: 17.13 km^{2} (6.61 sq mi)
- Elevation: 423 m (1,388 ft)

Population (2018-01-01)
  - Total: 972
  - Density: 56.7/km^{2} (147/sq mi)
- Time zone: UTC+1 (CET)
  - Summer (DST): UTC+2 (CEST)
- Postal code: 5134
- Area code: 07728
- Vehicle registration: BR
- Website: www.oberoesterreich. at/schwand

Schwand im Innkreis is a municipality in the district of Braunau am Inn in the Austrian state of Upper Austria.

== Geography ==
Schwand lies in the Innviertel. About 6 percent of the municipality is forest and 88 percent farmland.

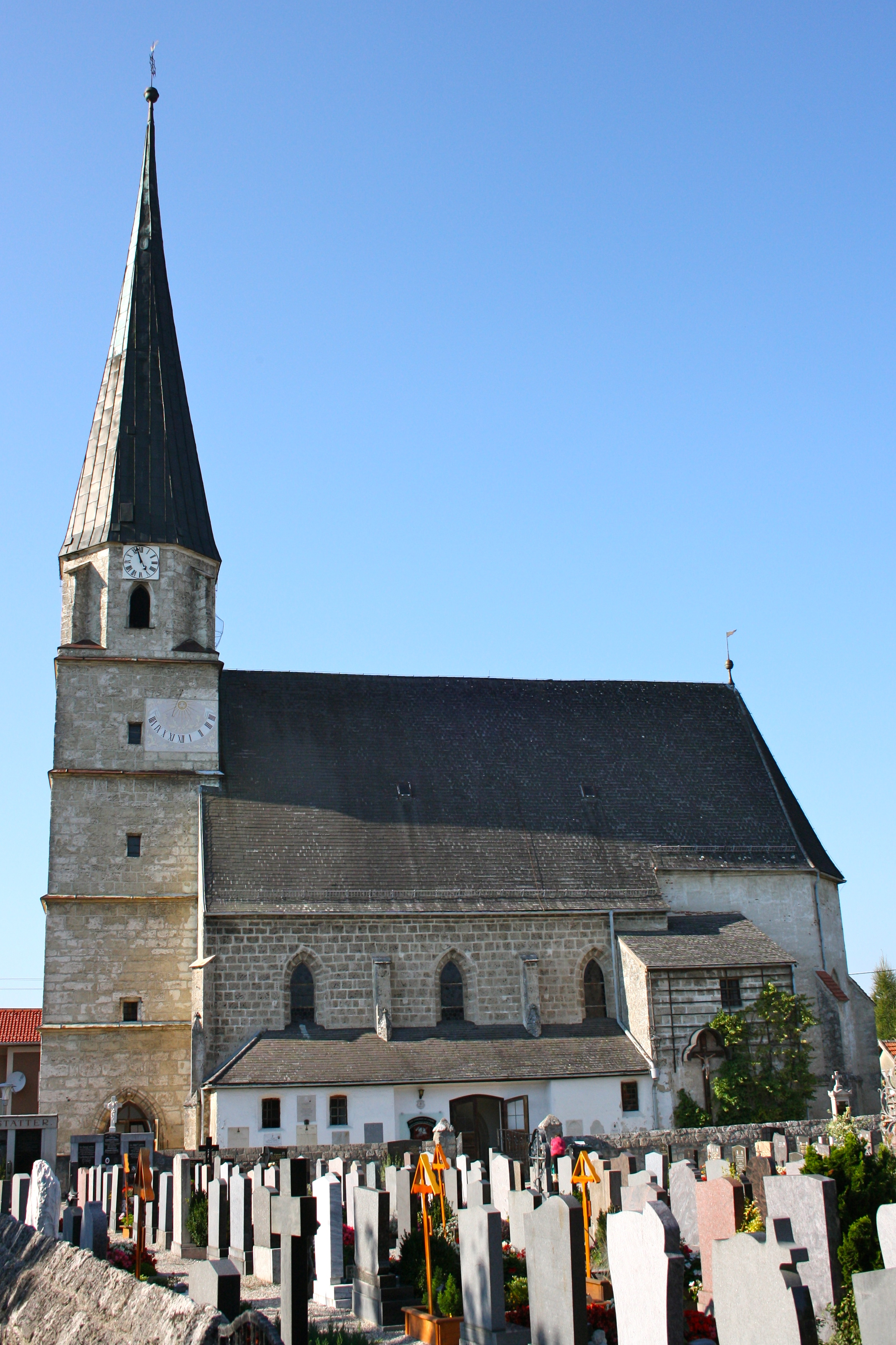
Church in Schwand im Innkreis
