= Mattighofen =

- Municipality
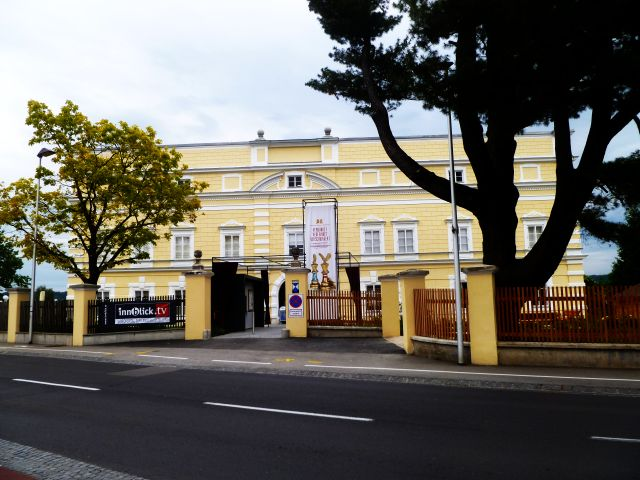
- Mattighofen palace

- Coat of arms

- Location within Austria
- Coordinates: 48°06′24″N 13°08′58″E
- Country: Austria
- State: Upper Austria
- District: Braunau am Inn

Government
  - Mayor: Daniel Lang (ÖVP)

Area
  - Total: 5.16 km^{2} (1.99 sq mi)
- Elevation: 454 m (1,490 ft)

Population (2018-01-01)
  - Total: 6,524
  - Density: 1,260/km^{2} (3,270/sq mi)
- Time zone: UTC+1 (CET)
  - Summer (DST): UTC+2 (CEST)
- Postal code: 5230
- Area code: 07742
- Vehicle registration: BR
- Website: www.mattighofen.at

Mattighofen is a town in the district of Braunau am Inn, part of the Innviertel region, in the Austrian state of Upper Austria. It's known for having the headquarters of KTM.

== History ==
Initially Mattighofen belonged to the stem duchy of Bavaria, that became a part of Francia. In 757 a Kaiserpfalz (palace) of the ruling Carolingian dynasty was documented here. On the Frankfurt synod of 1007 Emperor Henry II granted the Mattighofen estates to the newly created Bishopric of Bamberg. It was acquired by the House of Wittelsbach in the 16th century and affected by the War of the Bavarian Succession after which it passed to the Archduchy of Austria according to the 1779 Treaty of Teschen. Mattighofen received town privileges in 1986.

== Economy ==
Mattighofen is the headquarters of the KTM brand, which produces Automobiles, Motorcycles and bicycles, and Husqvarna Motorcycles, a Swedish-origin company designs which also engineers, manufactures and distributes motocross, enduro, supermoto and street motorcycles.

== Politics ==
Seats in the municipal assembly (Gemeinderat) as of 2009 elections:

- Social Democratic Party of Austria (SPÖ): 13
- Austrian People's Party (ÖVP): 6
- Bewegung für Mattighofen: 6
- Freedom Party of Austria (FPÖ): 4
- The Greens – The Green Alternative (Die Grünen): 1
