= Polling im Innkreis =

- Municipality
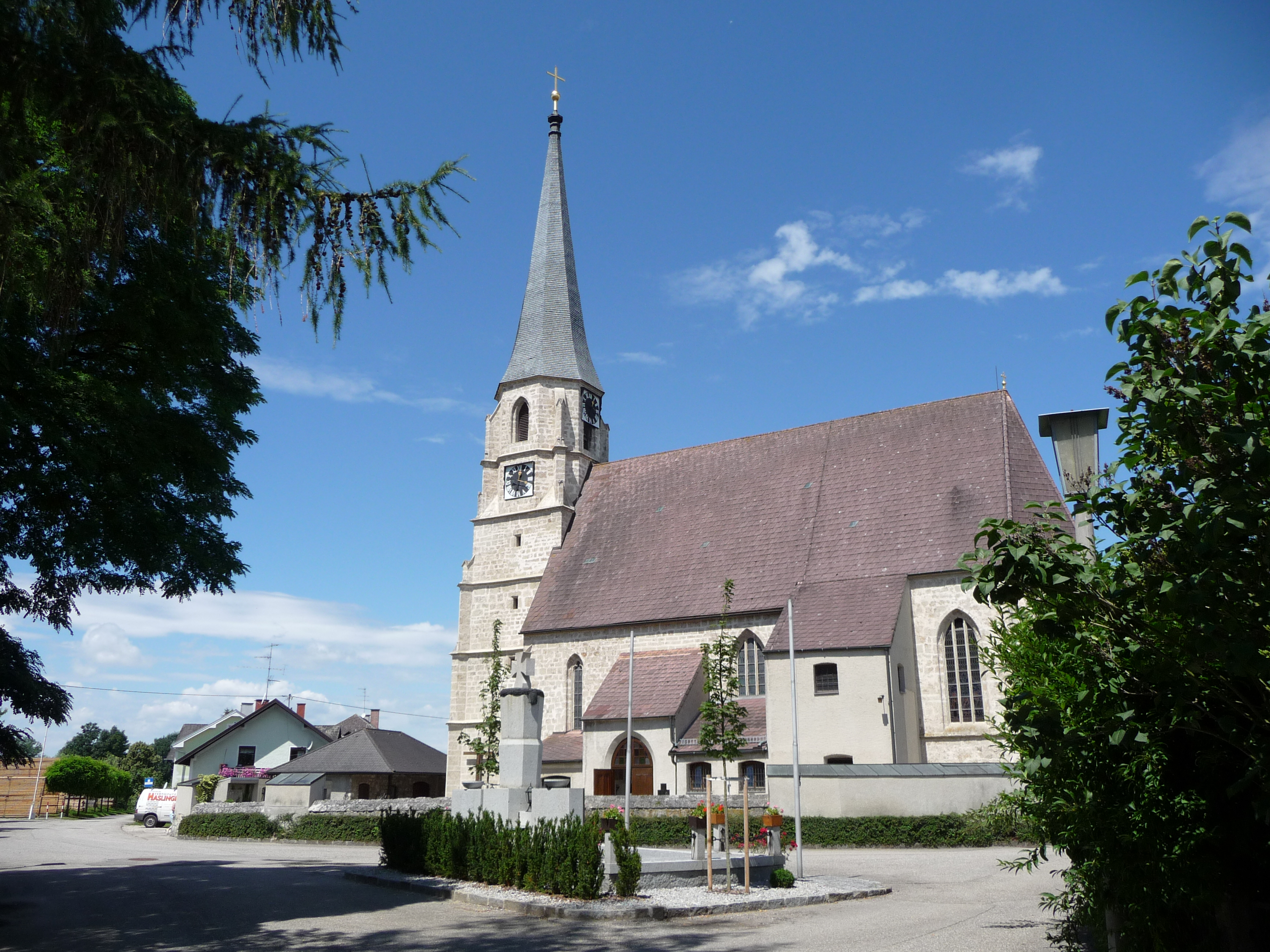
- Church of Saint Andrew

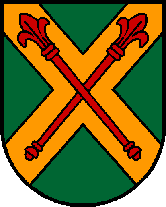
- Coat of arms

- Location within Austria
- Coordinates: 48°13′50″N 13°16′50″E
- Country: Austria
- State: Upper Austria
- District: Braunau am Inn

Government
  - Mayor: Karl Reiter-Stranzinger (ÖVP)

Area
  - Total: 15.11 km^{2} (5.83 sq mi)
- Elevation: 385 m (1,263 ft)

Population (2018-01-01)
  - Total: 997
  - Density: 66.0/km^{2} (171/sq mi)
- Time zone: UTC+1 (CET)
  - Summer (DST): UTC+2 (CEST)
- Postal code: 4951
- Area code: 07723
- Vehicle registration: BR
- Website: http://www.polling-innkreis.ooe.gv.at/

Polling im Innkreis is a municipality in the district of Braunau am Inn in the Austrian state of Upper Austria.

== Geography ==
Polling lies in the Innviertel. About 10 percent of the municipality is forest and 86 percent farmland.
