= Auerbach, Upper Austria =

Auerbach
- Municipality
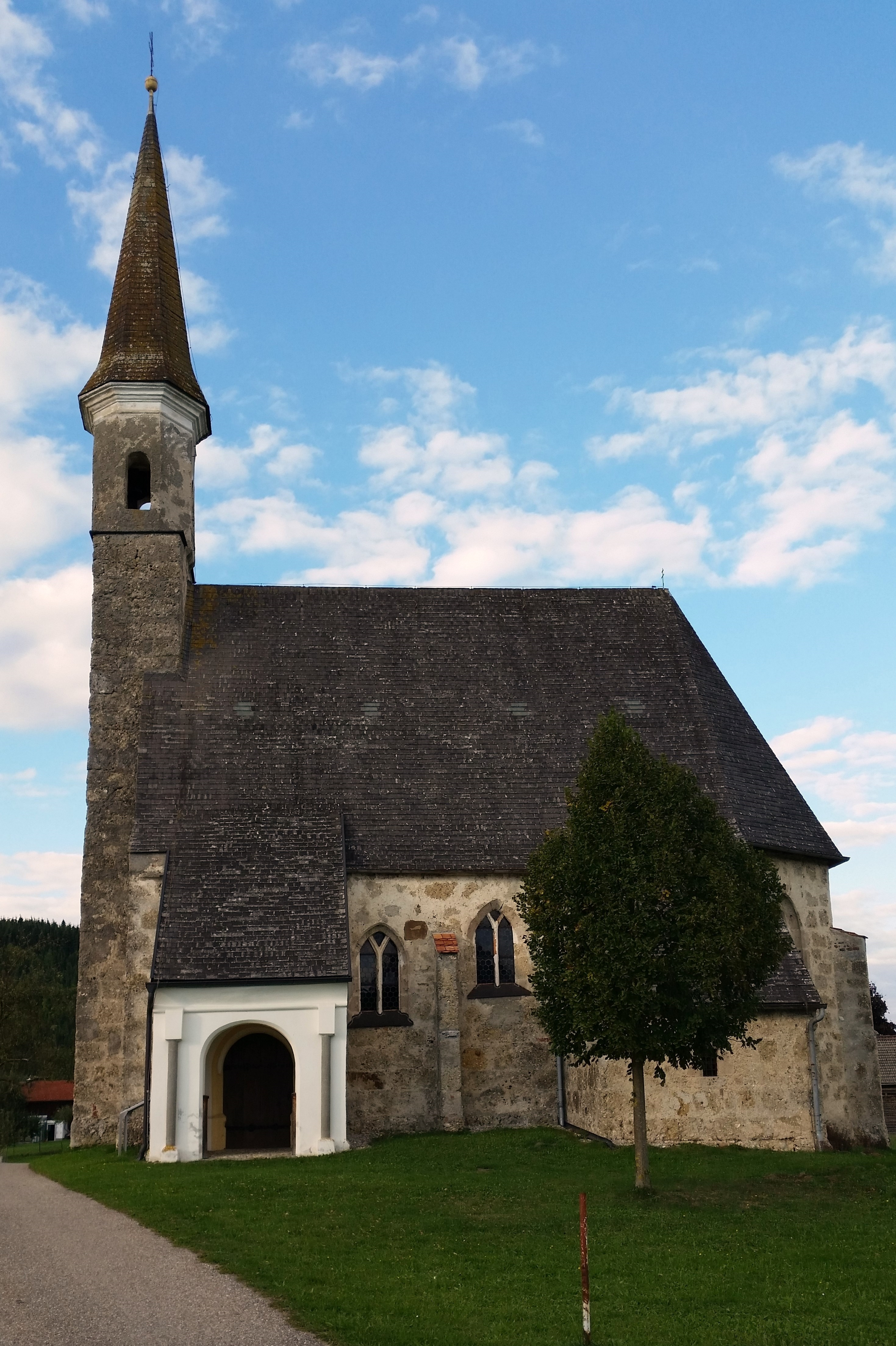
- Catholic church in Höring (part of Auerbach)

- Coat of arms

- Location within Austria
- Coordinates: 48°03′54″N 13°06′33″E
- Country: Austria
- State: Upper Austria
- District: Braunau am Inn

Government
  - Mayor: Friedrich Pommer (ÖVP)

Area
  - Total: 10.8 km^{2} (4.2 sq mi)
- Elevation: 488 m (1,601 ft)

Population (2018-01-01)
  - Total: 583
  - Density: 54.0/km^{2} (140/sq mi)
- Time zone: UTC+1 (CET)
  - Summer (DST): UTC+2 (CEST)
- Postal code: 5224
- Area code: 07747
- Vehicle registration: BR

Auerbach (German pronunciation: [ˈaʊɐbax]) is a town in Upper Austria, Austria. Its length from north to south is 4.3 km and from east to west is 5 km; its area is 10.78 km^{2}. In 2015, it had 565 inhabitants.

== Subdivisions ==
Auerbach consists of two Katastralgemeinden: Auerbach and Irnprechting. It contains the following settlements:

- Auerbach
- Holz
- Höring
- Oberirnprechting
- Oberkling
- Riensberg
- Rietzing
- Unterirnprechting
- Unterkling
- Wimpassing

== History ==
Auerbach was part of the Duchy of Bavaria until 1779, when it passed to Austria with the rest of the Innviertel as a result of the Treaty of Teschen, that ended the War of the Bavarian Succession. During the Napoleonic Wars, it became Bavarian again until 1814, when it rejoined Upper Austria.

== Population ==
Historical population
Year	Pop.	±%
1991	498	—
2001	505	+1.4%
2011	522	+3.4%
2021	718	+37.5%
