= Kirchberg bei Mattighofen =

- Municipality
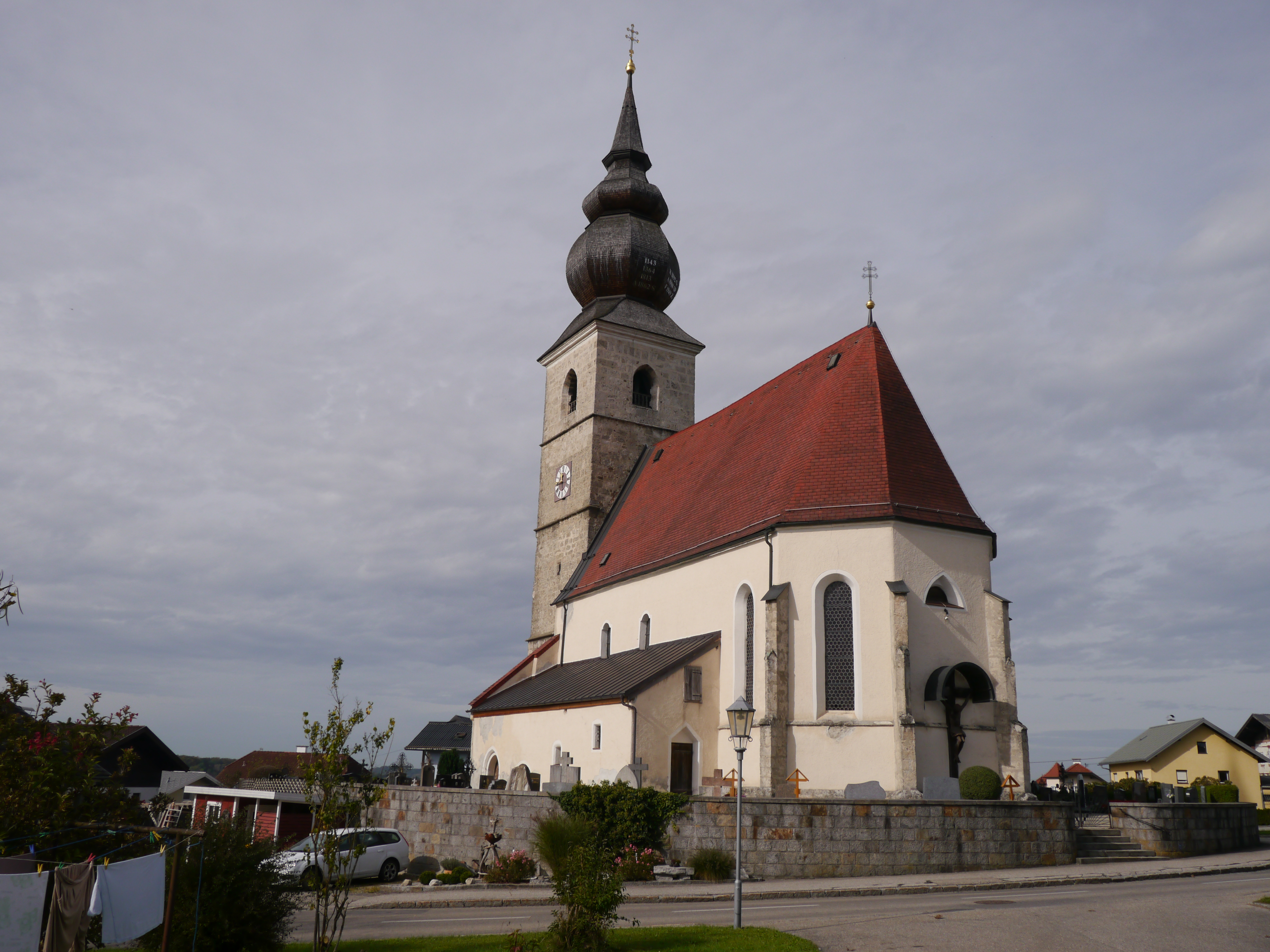
- Kirchberg parish church

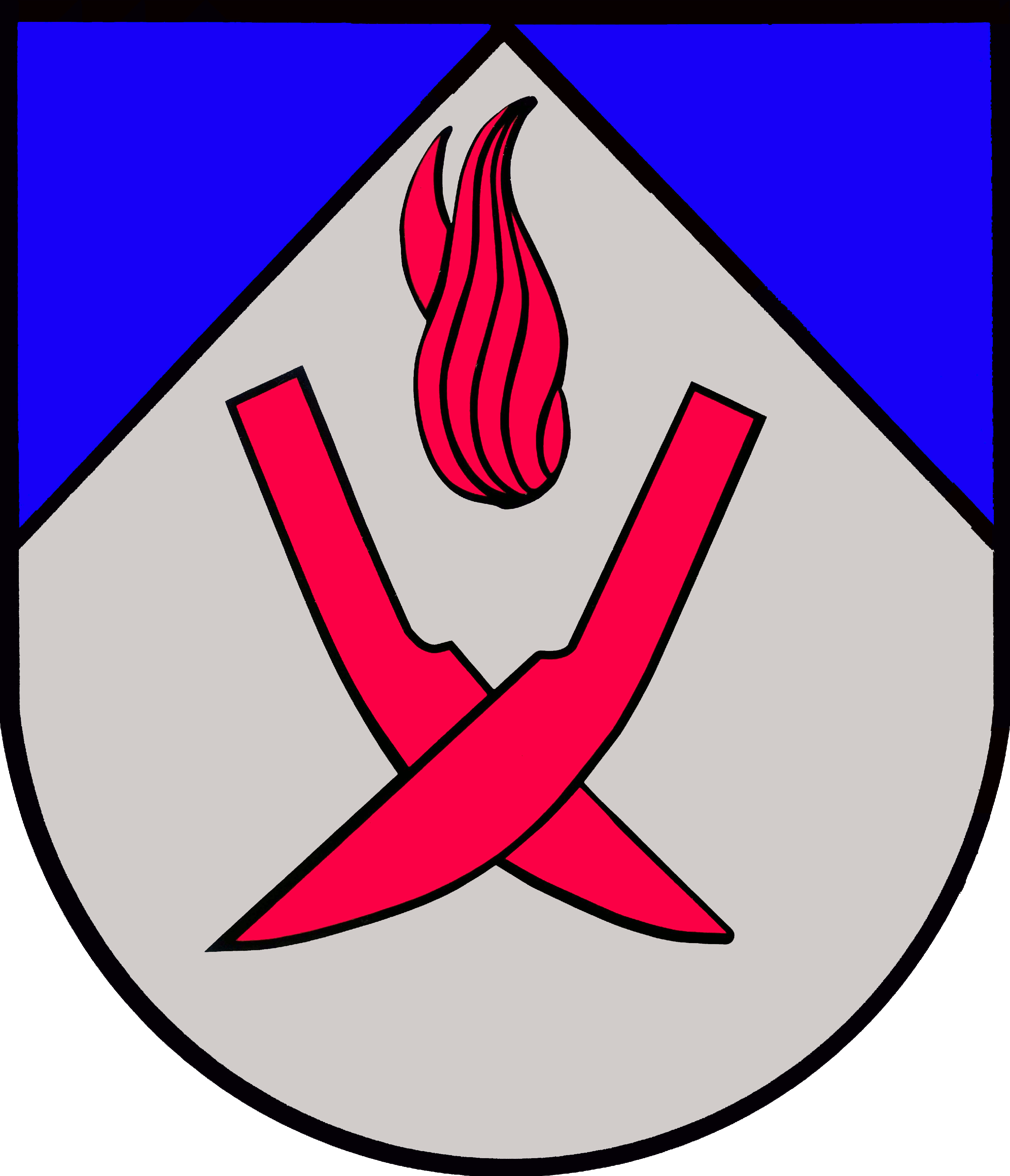
- Coat of arms

- Location within Austria
- Coordinates: 48°02′00″N 13°06′00″E
- Country: Austria
- State: Upper Austria
- District: Braunau am Inn

Government
  - Mayor: Franz Zehentner

Area
  - Total: 15.77 km^{2} (6.09 sq mi)
- Elevation: 560 m (1,840 ft)

Population (2018-01-01)
  - Total: 1,175
  - Density: 74.51/km^{2} (193.0/sq mi)
- Time zone: UTC+1 (CET)
  - Summer (DST): UTC+2 (CEST)
- Postal code: 5232
- Area code: 07747
- Vehicle registration: BR
- Website: www.oberoesterreich.at/ kirchberg.mattighofen

Kirchberg bei Mattighofen is a municipality in the district of Braunau am Inn in the Austrian state of Upper Austria.
