= Geretsberg =

- Municipality
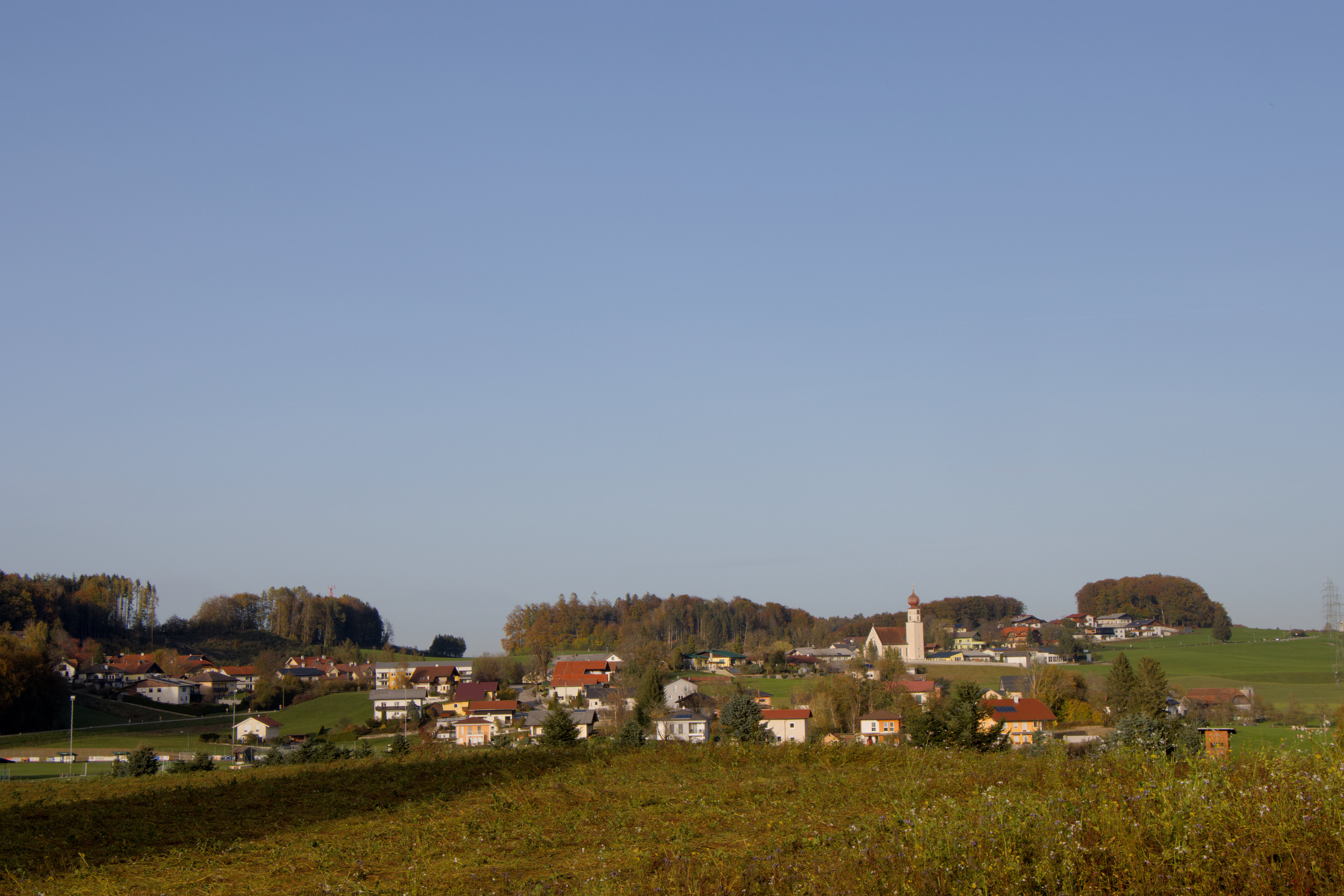

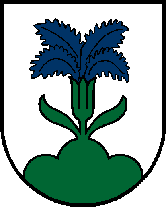
- Coat of arms

- Location within Austria
- Coordinates: 48°05′20″N 12°56′05″E
- Country: Austria
- State: Upper Austria
- District: Braunau am Inn

Government
  - Mayor: Josef Lechner (ÖVP)

Area
  - Total: 37.54 km^{2} (14.49 sq mi)
- Elevation: 491 m (1,611 ft)

Population (2018-01-01)
  - Total: 1,187
  - Density: 31.62/km^{2} (81.89/sq mi)
- Time zone: UTC+1 (CET)
  - Summer (DST): UTC+2 (CEST)
- Postal code: 5121, 5131, 5132, 5133
- Area code: 07748
- Vehicle registration: BR

Geretsberg is a municipality in the district Braunau am Inn in the Austrian state of Upper Austria.

== Geography ==
Geretsberg lies in the Innviertel. About 69 percent of the municipality is forest and 27 percent farmland.

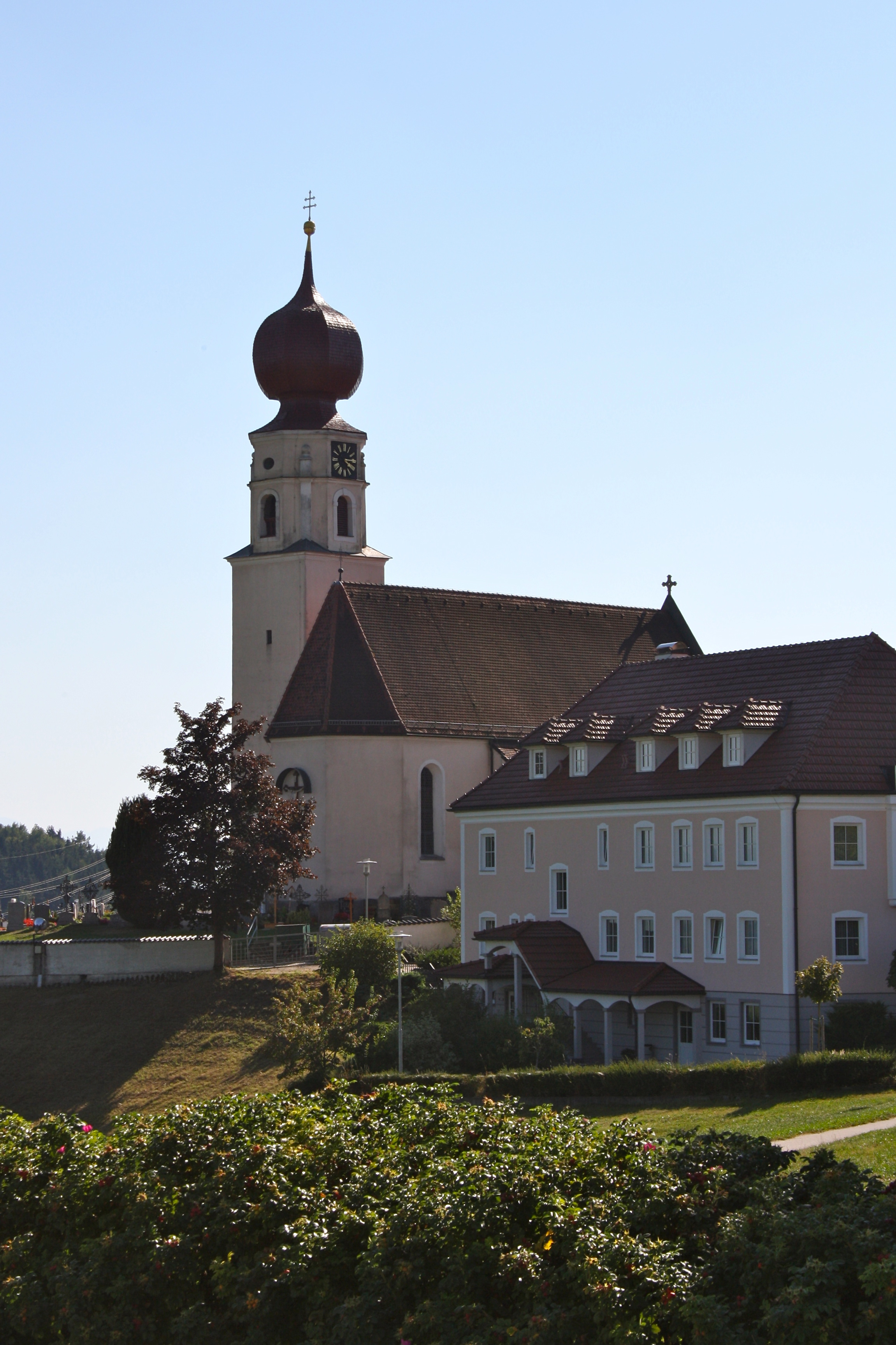
Church in Geretsberg
