= Roßbach, Austria =

Roßbach
- Municipality
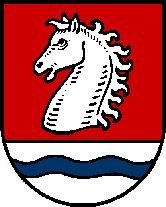
- Coat of arms

- Location within Austria
- Coordinates: 48°12′00″N 13°15′10″E
- Country: Austria
- State: Upper Austria
- District: Braunau am Inn

Government
  - Mayor: Franz Bernroitner (ÖVP)

Area
  - Total: 14.92 km^{2} (5.76 sq mi)
- Elevation: 442 m (1,450 ft)

Population (2018-01-01)
  - Total: 935
  - Density: 62.7/km^{2} (162/sq mi)
- Time zone: UTC+1 (CET)
  - Summer (DST): UTC+2 (CEST)
- Postal code: 5273
- Area code: 07724, 07723, 07755
- Vehicle registration: BR
- Website: www.rossbach.at

Roßbach (Austrian German pronunciation: [ˈroːsˌbax]) is a municipality in the district of Braunau am Inn in the Austrian state of Upper Austria.

== Geography ==
Roßbach lies in the Innviertel. About 30 percent of the municipality is forest and 64 percent farmland.
