= Franking, Austria =

Franking
- Municipality
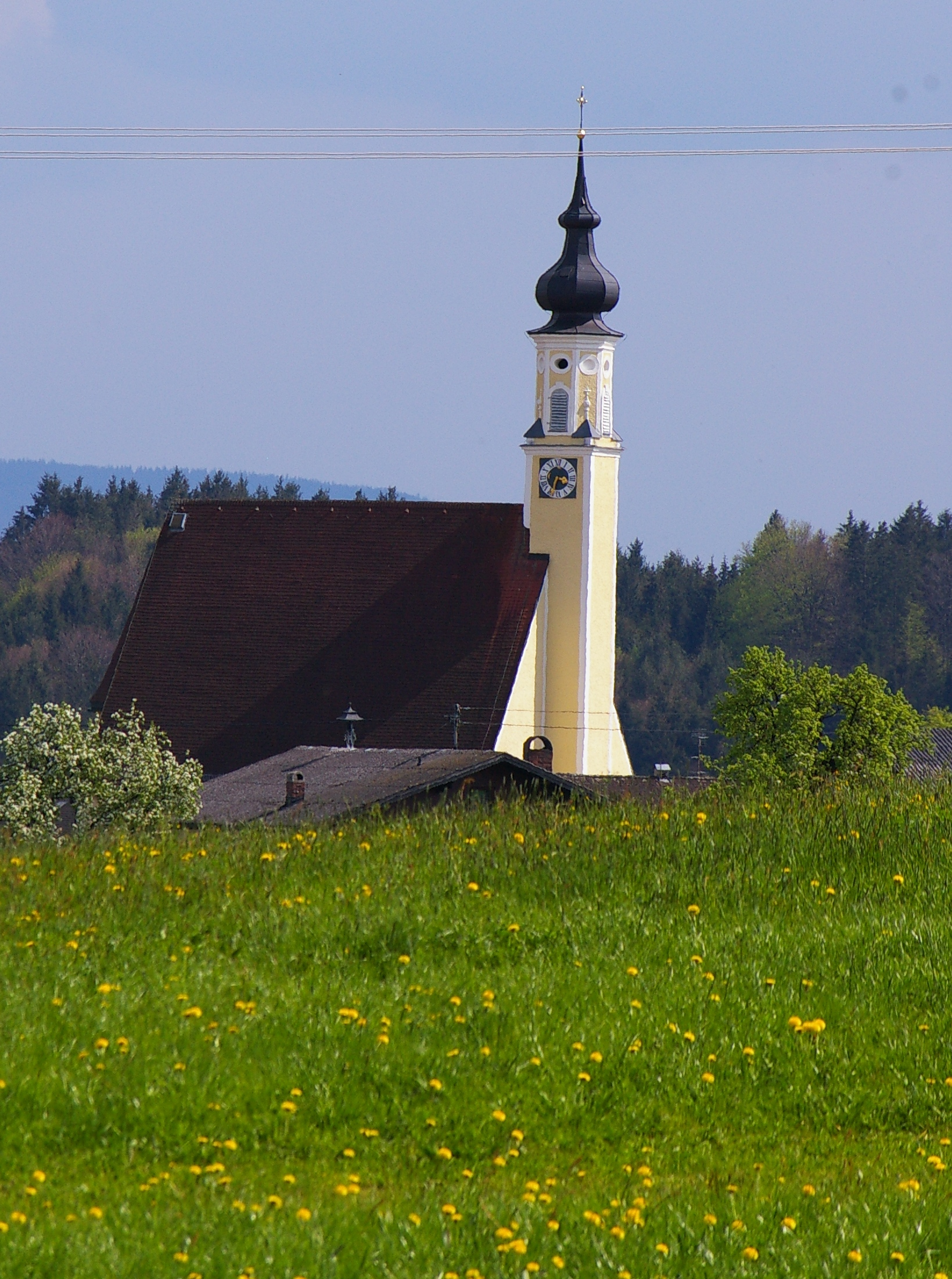

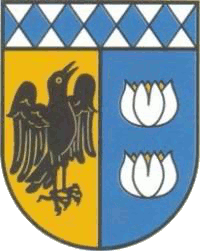
- Coat of arms

- Location within Austria
- Coordinates: 48°02′00″N 12°55′00″E
- Country: Austria
- State: Upper Austria
- District: Braunau am Inn

Government
  - Mayor: Josef Lasser (ÖVP)

Area
  - Total: 10.46 km^{2} (4.04 sq mi)
- Elevation: 457 m (1,499 ft)

Population (2018-01-01)
  - Total: 953
  - Density: 91.1/km^{2} (236/sq mi)
- Time zone: UTC+1 (CET)
  - Summer (DST): UTC+2 (CEST)
- Postal code: 5131
- Area code: 06277
- Vehicle registration: BR
- Website: www.franking.ooe.gv.at

Franking is a municipality in the district Braunau am Inn in the Austrian state of Upper Austria.

== Geography ==
Franking is situated in the western part of Upper Austria near the border to Germany and Salzburg. The towns is 457 m above sea level, the area is 10.44 km^{2} and there are 955 inhabitants.

=== Villages ===
The villages in the municipity are (with population in brackets as at 1 Jan 2020):

- Buch (30)
- Dorfibm (52)
- Eggenham (101)
- Eisengöring (84)
- Franking (250)
- Holzöster (218)
- Holzleithen (92)
- Neuhausen (77)
- Oberfranking (108)

== History ==
The name Franking comes from the Old High German name "Franko or Francho". The name was first mentioned in 1150, when a Ulricus von franchingen is named in a document. Till 1779 Franking was part of Bavaria, after the Treaty of Teschen it became part of Austria.
