= Mauerkirchen =

- Municipality
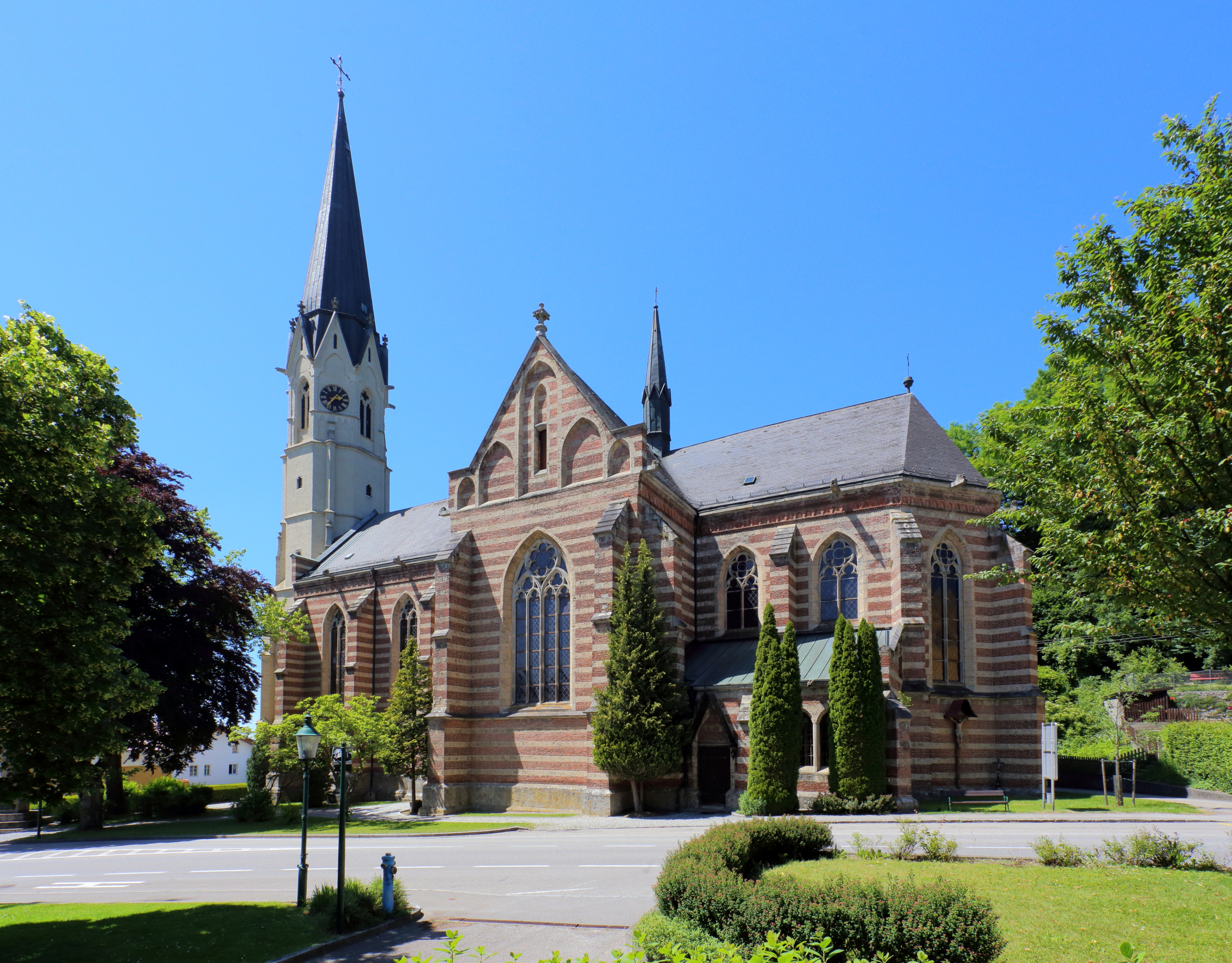
- Church of the Assumption of the Virgin Mary

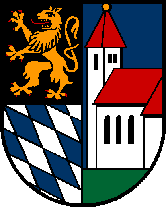
- Coat of arms

- Location within Austria
- Coordinates: 48°11′27″N 13°08′07″E
- Country: Austria
- State: Upper Austria
- District: Braunau am Inn

Government
  - Mayor: Horst Gerner (SPÖ interim)

Area
  - Total: 3.09 km^{2} (1.19 sq mi)
- Elevation: 407 m (1,335 ft)

Population (2018-01-01)
  - Total: 2,566
  - Density: 830/km^{2} (2,150/sq mi)
- Time zone: UTC+1 (CET)
  - Summer (DST): UTC+2 (CEST)
- Postal code: 5270
- Area code: 07724
- Vehicle registration: BR
- Website: https://www.mauerkirchen.ooe.gv.at/

Mauerkirchen is a municipality in the district of Braunau am Inn in the Austrian state of Upper Austria.
