= Burgkirchen, Austria =

Burgkirchen
- Municipality
- Coat of arms

- Location within Austria
- Coordinates: 48°12′16″N 13°06′05″E
- Country: Austria
- State: Upper Austria
- District: Braunau am Inn

Government
  - Mayor: Albert Troppmair (ÖVP)

Area
  - Total: 45.91 km^{2} (17.73 sq mi)
- Elevation: 393 m (1,289 ft)

Population (2018-01-01)
  - Total: 2,661
  - Density: 57.96/km^{2} (150.1/sq mi)
- Time zone: UTC+1 (CET)
  - Summer (DST): UTC+2 (CEST)
- Postal code: 4963, 5145, 5261, 5270, 5274, 5280, 5282
- Area code: 07724
- Vehicle registration: BR
- Website: www.burgkirchen. ooe.gv.at

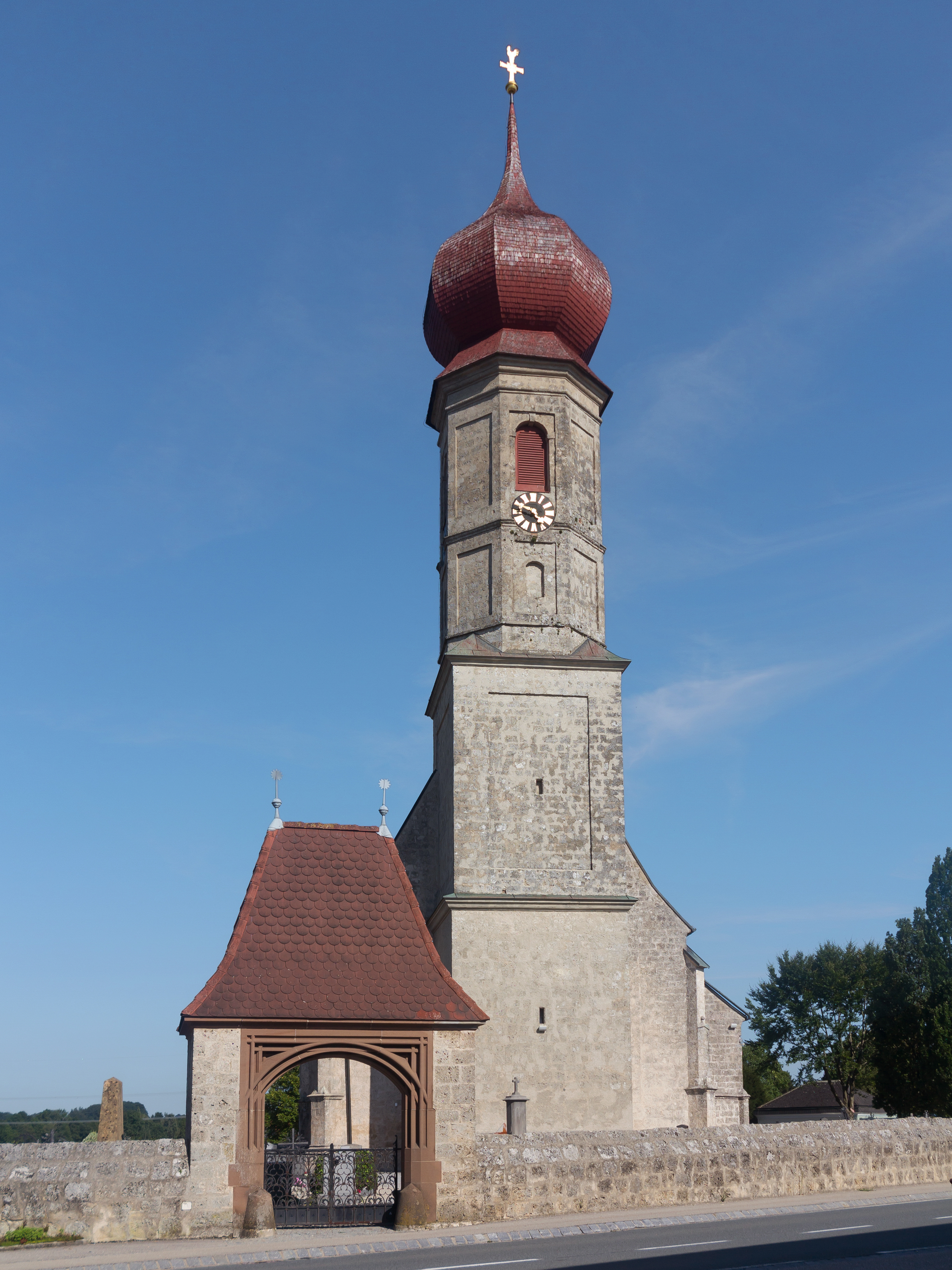
Burgkirchen, church

Burgkirchen is a municipality in the district Braunau am Inn in the Austrian state of Upper Austria.

== Geography ==
Burgkirchen lies in the Innviertel. About 30 percent of the municipality is forest and 61 percent farmland. It is also close the river Inn and is 8 km from the Austria–Germany border.
