= Altheim, Austria =

Altheim
- Municipality
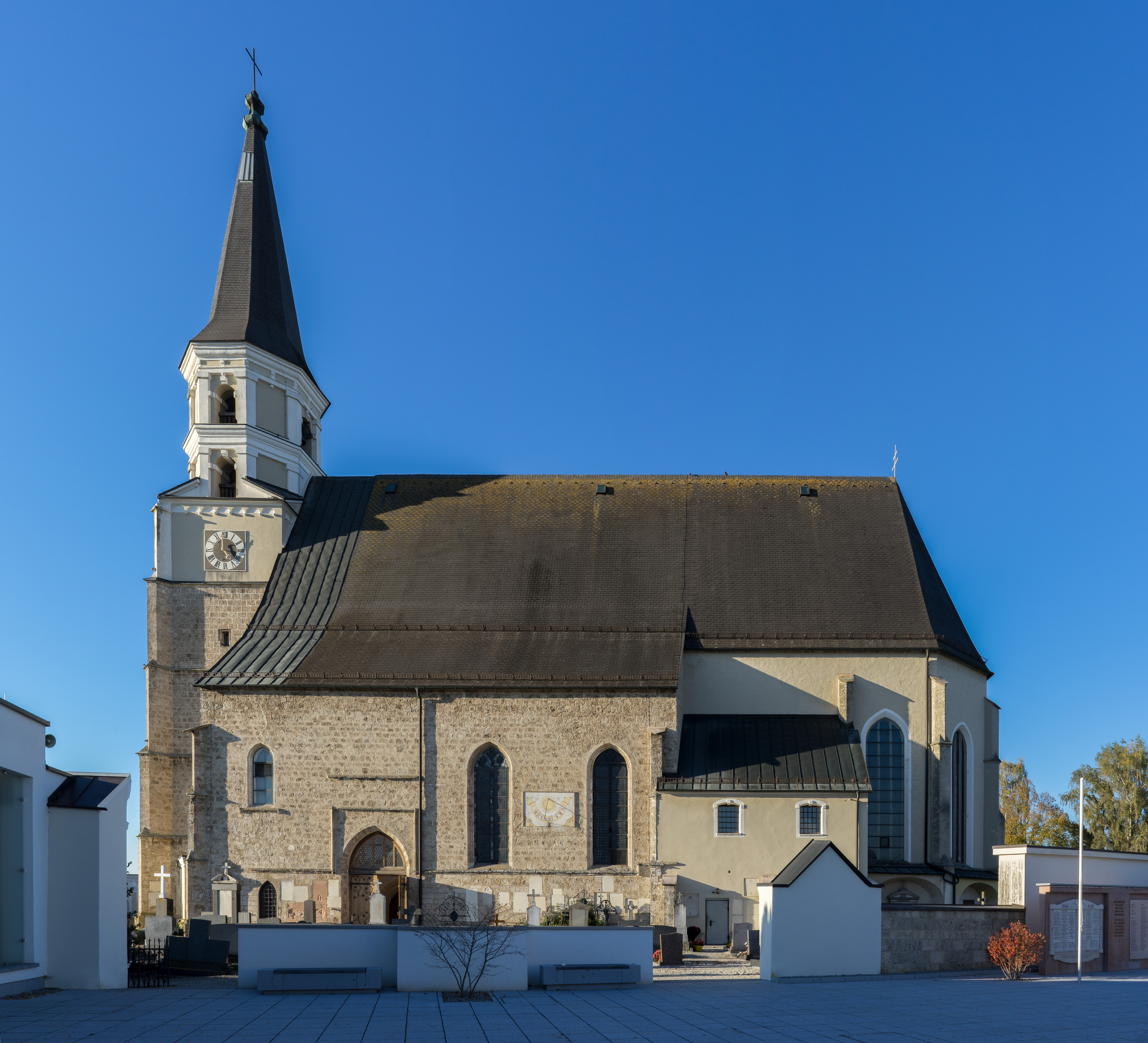
- Altheim parish church

- Coat of arms

- Location within Austria
- Coordinates: 48°15′00″N 13°14′00″E
- Country: Austria
- State: Upper Austria
- District: Braunau am Inn

Government
  - Mayor: Harald Huber (FPÖ)

Area
  - Total: 22.63 km^{2} (8.74 sq mi)
- Elevation: 363 m (1,191 ft)

Population (2018-01-01)
  - Total: 4,839
  - Density: 213.8/km^{2} (553.8/sq mi)
- Time zone: UTC+1 (CET)
  - Summer (DST): UTC+2 (CEST)
- Postal code: 4950
- Area code: 07723
- Vehicle registration: BR
- Website: www.altheim.ooe.gv.at

Altheim (German pronunciation: [ˈalthaɪm]) is a town in Austria. It is situated within the District of Braunau am Inn in the traditional region of Innviertel in the state of Upper Austria. It lies on the small river known as the Mühlheimer Ache, a tributary of the River Inn.

== Population ==
Historical population

Year	Pop.	±%
1869	2,371	—
1880	2,361	−0.4%
1890	2,604	+10.3%
1900	2,681	+3.0%
1910	2,796	+4.3%
1923	2,806	+0.4%

Year	Pop.	±%
1934	3,215	+14.6%
1939	3,134	−2.5%
1951	3,815	+21.7%
1961	4,271	+12.0%
1971	4,829	+13.1%
1981	4,684	−3.0%

Year	Pop.	±%
1991	4,681	−0.1%
2001	4,875	+4.1%
2011	4,801	−1.5%
2021	4,989	+3.9%

== Villages ==
- Altheim
- Diepolding
- Englwertsham
- Gallenberg
- Gaugsham
- Kling
- Lehen
- Lüfteneck
- Mauernberg
- Schwaig
- Stern
- Wagham
- Weidenthal
- Weirading
- Wolfegg

== Sights ==
In 1985 archaeologists discovered the ruins of a Roman villa in farmland just outside Altheim. In the town there is a Roman museum dedicated to these findings, the Ochzethaus.

== See also ==
- Braunau am Inn
- Linz
- Upper Austria
