= Brunnenthal =

Brunnenthal can refer to any of the following:

- Brunnenthal, Austria, a town in the district of Schärding in Upper Austria
- Brunnenthal, Switzerland
