= Rainbach =

Rainbach may refer to:

- Rainbach im Mühlkreis, a municipality in the district of Freistadt, Upper Austria, Austria
- Rainbach im Innkreis, a municipality in the district of Schärding, Upper Austria, Austria.
