= Wernstein am Inn =

Wernstein am Inn Weanstoa
- Municipality
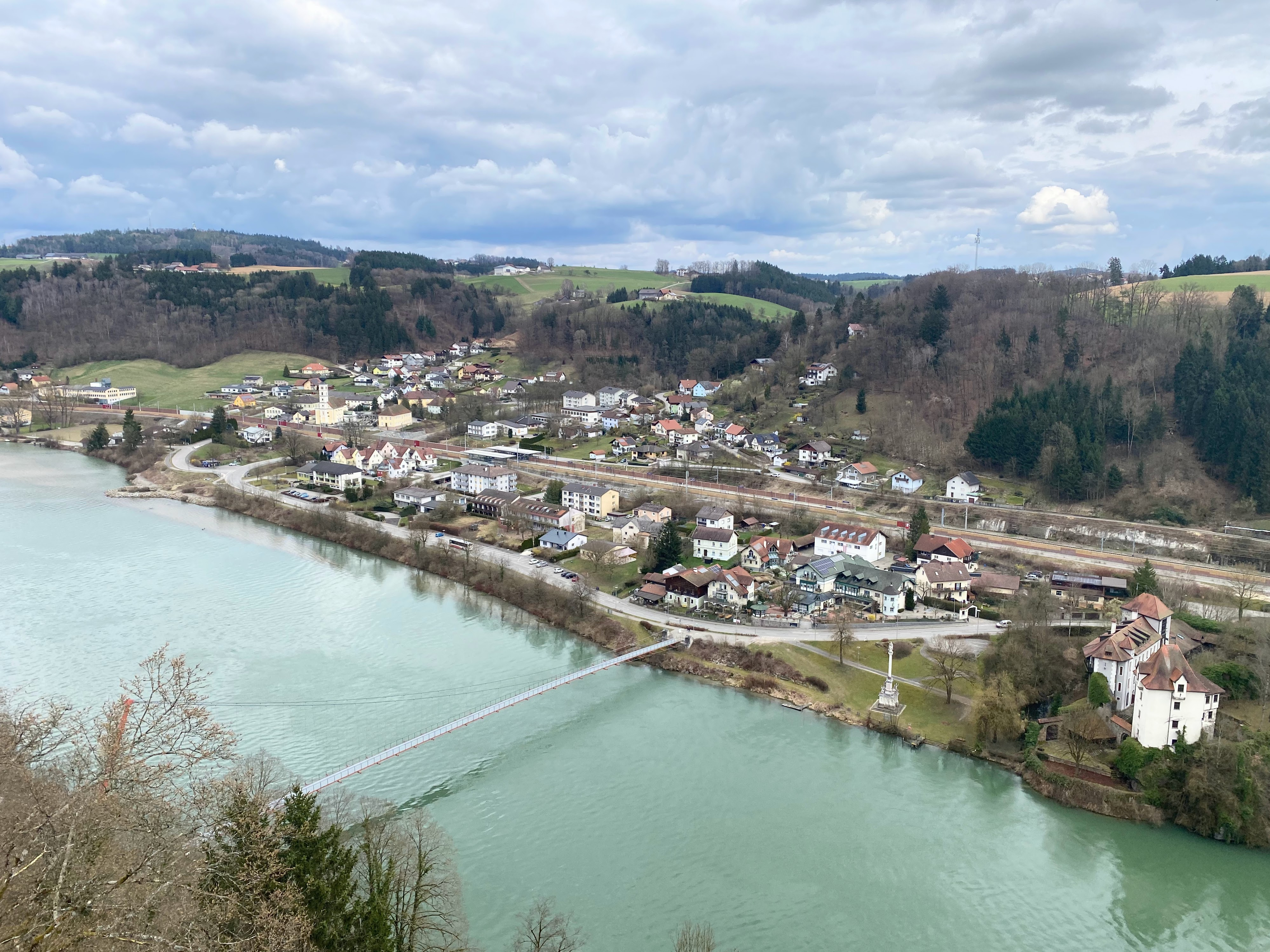

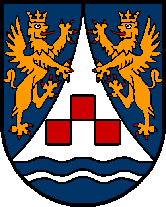
- Coat of arms

- Location within Austria
- Coordinates: 48°30′31″N 13°27′37″E
- Country: Austria
- State: Upper Austria
- District: Schärding

Government
  - Mayor: Johann Mayr (ÖVP)

Area
  - Total: 16.52 km^{2} (6.38 sq mi)
- Elevation: 319 m (1,047 ft)

Population (2018-01-01)
  - Total: 1,566
  - Density: 94.79/km^{2} (245.5/sq mi)
- Time zone: UTC+1 (CET)
  - Summer (DST): UTC+2 (CEST)
- Postal code: 4783
- Area code: 07713
- Vehicle registration: SD
- Website: www.wernstein.at

Wernstein am Inn (Central Bavarian: Weanstoa) is a municipality in the district of Schärding in the Austrian state of Upper Austria.

== Geography ==
Wernstein lies in the Innviertel. About 21 percent of the municipality is forest, and 67 percent is farmland.
