= Waldeck Castle =

Waldeck Castle may refer to the following castles:

== Austria ==
- Waldeck Castle (Carinthia) near Liebenfels-Hardegg in Carinthia
- Waldeck Castle (Upper Austria), burgstall near Diersbach in Upper Austria

== Czech Republic ==
- Waldeck Castle (Middle Bohemia) near Chaloupky in Middle Bohemia

== Germany ==
- Waldeck Castle (Black Forest) in Kohlerstal, Calw, Landkreis Calw, Baden-Württemberg
- Waldeck Castle (Hunsrück) in Dorweiler, Dommershausen, Rhein-Hunsrück-Kreis, Rhineland-Palatinate
- Waldeck Castle (Lorch), near Lorch in the Rheingau, Hesse
- Waldeck Castle (Upper Palatinate), overlooking Waldeck, near Kemnath, Bavaria
- Waldeck Castle (Dinkelsbühl), lost castle near Dinkelsbühl, Middle Franconia, Bavaria
- Waldeck Castle (Waldeck), also called Schloss Waldeck, in Waldeck, Hesse
