= Waldkirchen am Wesen =

- Municipality
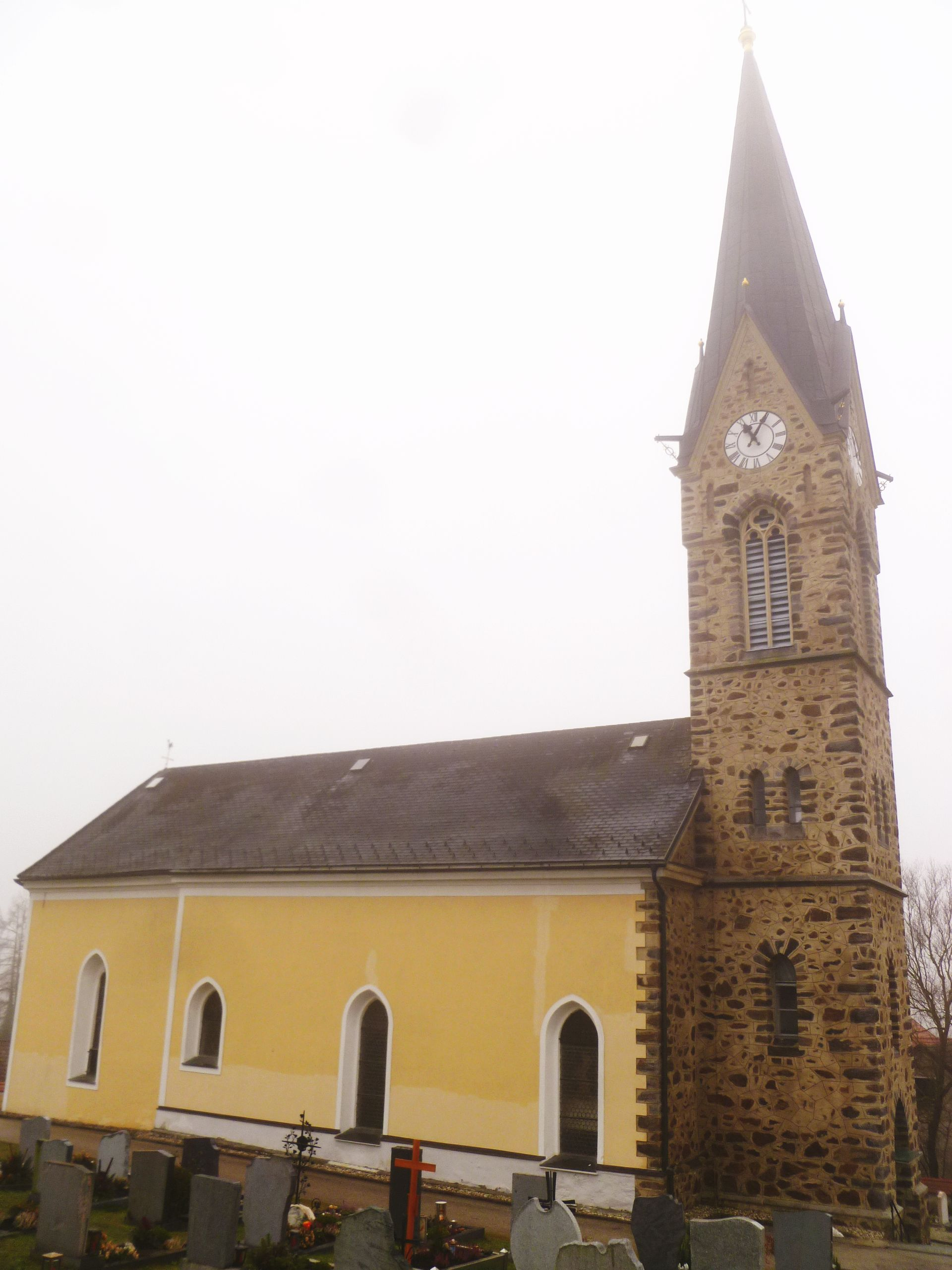

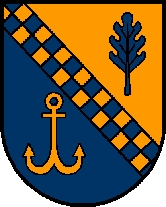
- Coat of arms

- Location within Austria
- Coordinates: 48°27′00″N 13°49′00″E
- Country: Austria
- State: Upper Austria
- District: Schärding

Government
  - Mayor: Herbert Strasser (ÖVP)

Area
  - Total: 21.41 km^{2} (8.27 sq mi)
- Elevation: 550 m (1,800 ft)

Population (2018-01-01)
  - Total: 1,171
  - Density: 54.69/km^{2} (141.7/sq mi)
- Time zone: UTC+1 (CET)
  - Summer (DST): UTC+2 (CEST)
- Postal code: 4085
- Area code: 07718
- Vehicle registration: SD
- Website: www.waldkirchen.at

Waldkirchen am Wesen is a municipality in the district of Schärding in the Austrian state of Upper Austria.

== Geography ==
Waldkirchen lies in the Innviertel. About 34 percent of the municipality is forest, and 53 percent is farmland.
