= Pram =

Pram or PRAM may refer to:

== Places ==
- Pram, Austria, a municipality in the district of Grieskirchen in the Austrian state of Upper Austria
- Dorf an der Pram, a municipality in the district of Schärding in the Austrian state of Upper Austria
- Zell an der Pram, a municipality in the district of Schärding in the Austrian state of Upper Austria

== People ==
- Christen Pram (1756–1821), Norwegian/Danish economist, civil servant, poet, novelist, playwright, diarist and editor

== Arts and entertainment ==
- Pram (band), a musical group
- The Pram Factory, an Australian alternative theatre venue in the Melbourne suburb of Carlton
- Pram, a character in the video game Makai Kingdom: Chronicles of the Sacred Tome

== Science ==
- Parallel RAM, an abstract computer for designing parallel algorithms
- Phase-change RAM, a chalcogenide glass type of non-volatile random-access memory
- Parameter RAM, an area of non-volatile random-access memory used to store system settings on Apple's Macintosh computers
- PRAM1, or PML-RARA-regulated adapter molecule 1, a protein that in humans is encoded by the PRAM1 gene

== Transportation ==
- Puerto Rico Air Management Services (PRAMS), an air charter and cargo operator, Miami International Airport, US
- Pram (boat), a small utility dinghy with a transom bow rather than a pointed bow
  - Optimist (dinghy), with a pram hull
- Pram (ship), a type of shallow-draught, flat-bottomed ship (large watercraft)
- Pram (baby), a type of wheeled baby transport

== Others ==
- Pram suit, a one-piece garment for infants, designed as cold-weather outerwear, and typically enclosing the entire body except for the face
