= Eggerding =

- Municipality
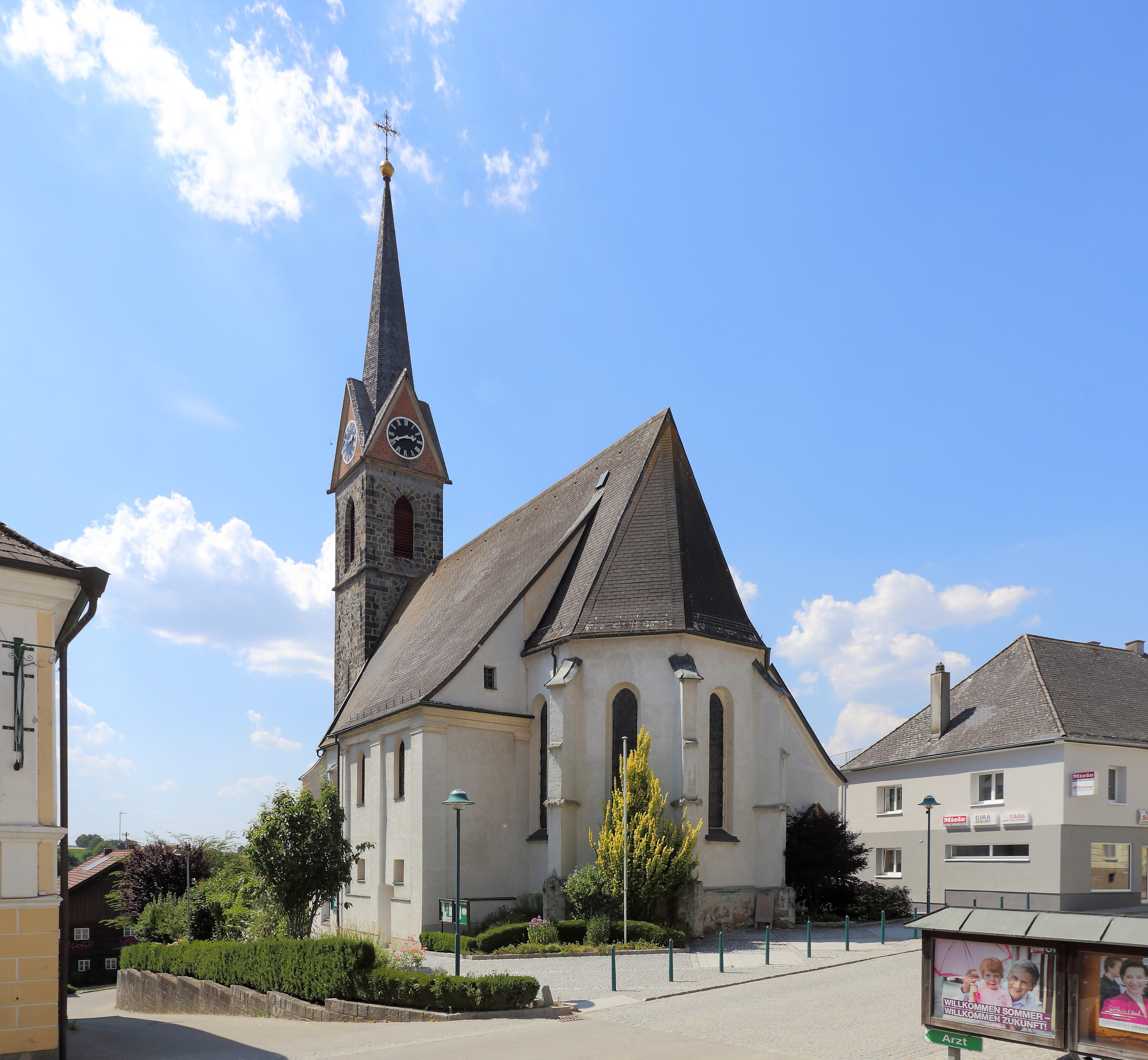

- Coat of arms

- Location within Austria
- Coordinates: 48°21′00″N 13°29′00″E
- Country: Austria
- State: Upper Austria
- District: Schärding

Government
  - Mayor: Christian Gallhammer (ÖVP)

Area
  - Total: 22.34 km^{2} (8.63 sq mi)
- Elevation: 382 m (1,253 ft)

Population (2018-01-01)
  - Total: 1,320
  - Density: 59.1/km^{2} (153/sq mi)
- Time zone: UTC+1 (CET)
  - Summer (DST): UTC+2 (CEST)
- Postal code: 4773
- Area code: 07767
- Vehicle registration: SD

Eggerding is a municipality in the district of Schärding in the Austrian state of Upper Austria.

== Geography ==
Eggerding lies in the Innviertel. About 10 percent of the municipality is forest, and 79 percent is farmland.
