= Mayrhof =

- Municipality
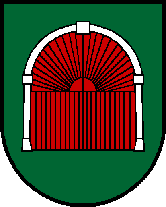
- Coat of arms

- Location within Austria
- Coordinates: 48°21′00″N 13°30′00″E
- Country: Austria
- State: Upper Austria
- District: Schärding

Government
  - Mayor: Johann Blümlinger (ÖVP)

Area
  - Total: 5.33 km^{2} (2.06 sq mi)
- Elevation: 430 m (1,410 ft)

Population (2018-01-01)
  - Total: 322
  - Density: 60.4/km^{2} (156/sq mi)
- Time zone: UTC+1 (CET)
  - Summer (DST): UTC+2 (CEST)
- Postal code: 4777
- Area code: 07767
- Vehicle registration: SD

Mayrhof is a municipality in the district of Schärding in the Austrian state of Upper Austria.

== Geography ==
Mayrhof lies in the Innviertel. About 9 percent of the municipality is forest, and 82 percent is farmland.
