= Kopfing im Innkreis =

- Municipality
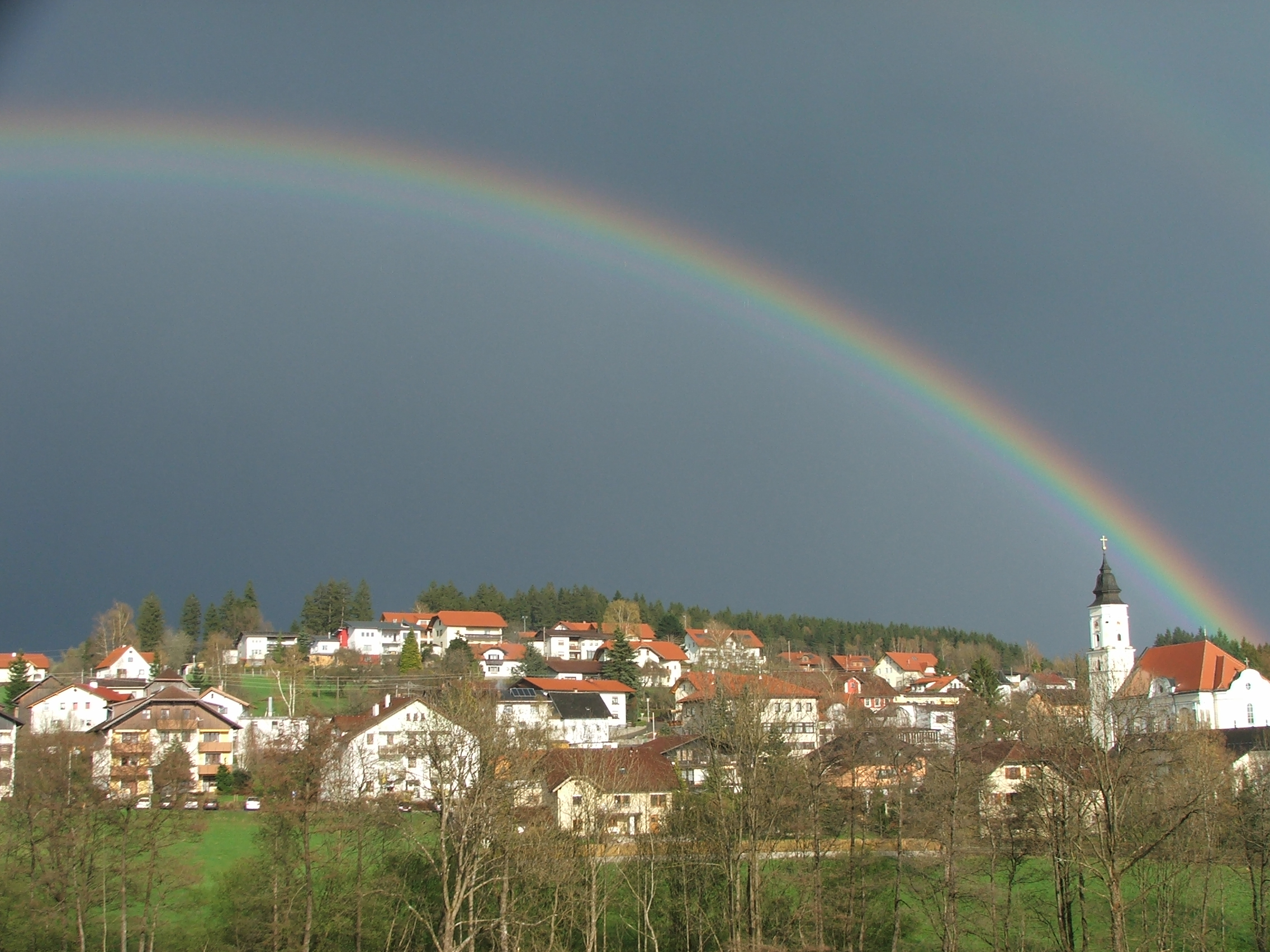

- Coat of arms

- Location within Austria
- Coordinates: 48°25′59″N 13°39′00″E
- Country: Austria
- State: Upper Austria
- District: Schärding

Government
  - Mayor: Otto Straßl (ÖVP)

Area
  - Total: 33.33 km^{2} (12.87 sq mi)
- Elevation: 547 m (1,795 ft)

Population (2018-01-01)
  - Total: 2,008
  - Density: 60.25/km^{2} (156.0/sq mi)
- Time zone: UTC+1 (CET)
  - Summer (DST): UTC+2 (CEST)
- Postal code: 4794
- Area code: 0 77 63
- Vehicle registration: SD
- Website: www.kopfing.at

Kopfing im Innkreis is a municipality in the district of Schärding in the Austrian state of Upper Austria.

== Geography ==
Kopfing lies in the northern Innviertel. About 46 percent of the municipality is forest, and 48 percent is farmland.
