= Sigharting =

- Municipality
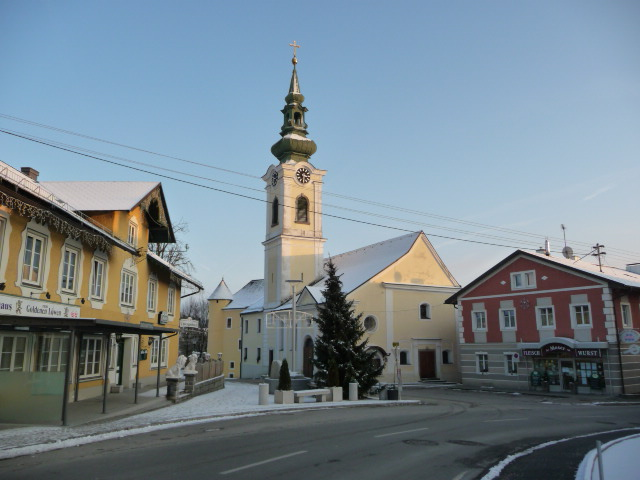

- Coat of arms

- Location within Austria
- Coordinates: 48°24′00″N 13°36′00″E
- Country: Austria
- State: Upper Austria
- District: Schärding

Government
  - Mayor: Alois Selker (ÖVP)

Area
  - Total: 5.66 km^{2} (2.19 sq mi)
- Elevation: 343 m (1,125 ft)

Population (2018-01-01)
  - Total: 848
  - Density: 150/km^{2} (388/sq mi)
- Time zone: UTC+1 (CET)
  - Summer (DST): UTC+2 (CEST)
- Postal code: 4771
- Area code: 07766
- Vehicle registration: SD
- Website: www.sigharting.at

Sigharting is a municipality in the district of Schärding in the Austrian state of Upper Austria.

== Geography ==
Sigharting lies in the northern Innviertel. About 12 percent of the municipality is forest, and 77 percent is farmland.
