= St. Roman =

St. Roman may refer to:

- Saint Roman, anglicized form of Saint Romanus
- Sankt Roman, Austrian municipality
