= Riedau =

- Municipality
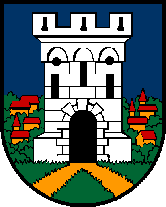
- Coat of arms

- Location within Austria
- Coordinates: 48°18′04″N 13°38′03″E
- Country: Austria
- State: Upper Austria
- District: Schärding

Government
  - Mayor: Berta Scheuringer (ÖVP)

Area
  - Total: 7.62 km^{2} (2.94 sq mi)
- Elevation: 376 m (1,234 ft)

Population (2018-01-01)
  - Total: 2,069
  - Density: 272/km^{2} (703/sq mi)
- Time zone: UTC+1 (CET)
  - Summer (DST): UTC+2 (CEST)
- Postal code: 4752
- Area code: 07764
- Vehicle registration: SD
- Website: www.riedau.at

Riedau is a municipality in the district of Schärding in the Austrian state of Upper Austria.

== Geography ==
Riedau lies in the Innviertel. About 13 percent of the municipality is forest, and 71 percent is farmland.
