= St. Florian =

St. Florian may refer to:

People:

- Saint Florian, 3rd-century Christian saint
- Florinus of Remüs, 9th-century Catholic saint
- Friedrich St. Florian (1932–2024), Austrian–American architect

Places named after the 3rd-century saint:

- Sankt Florian (Linz-Land), city in Austria
- Sankt Florian am Inn, municipality in Austria
- St. Florian, Alabama, town in America
