= Josef Weidenholzer =

Austrian politician

Josef Weidenholzer MEP
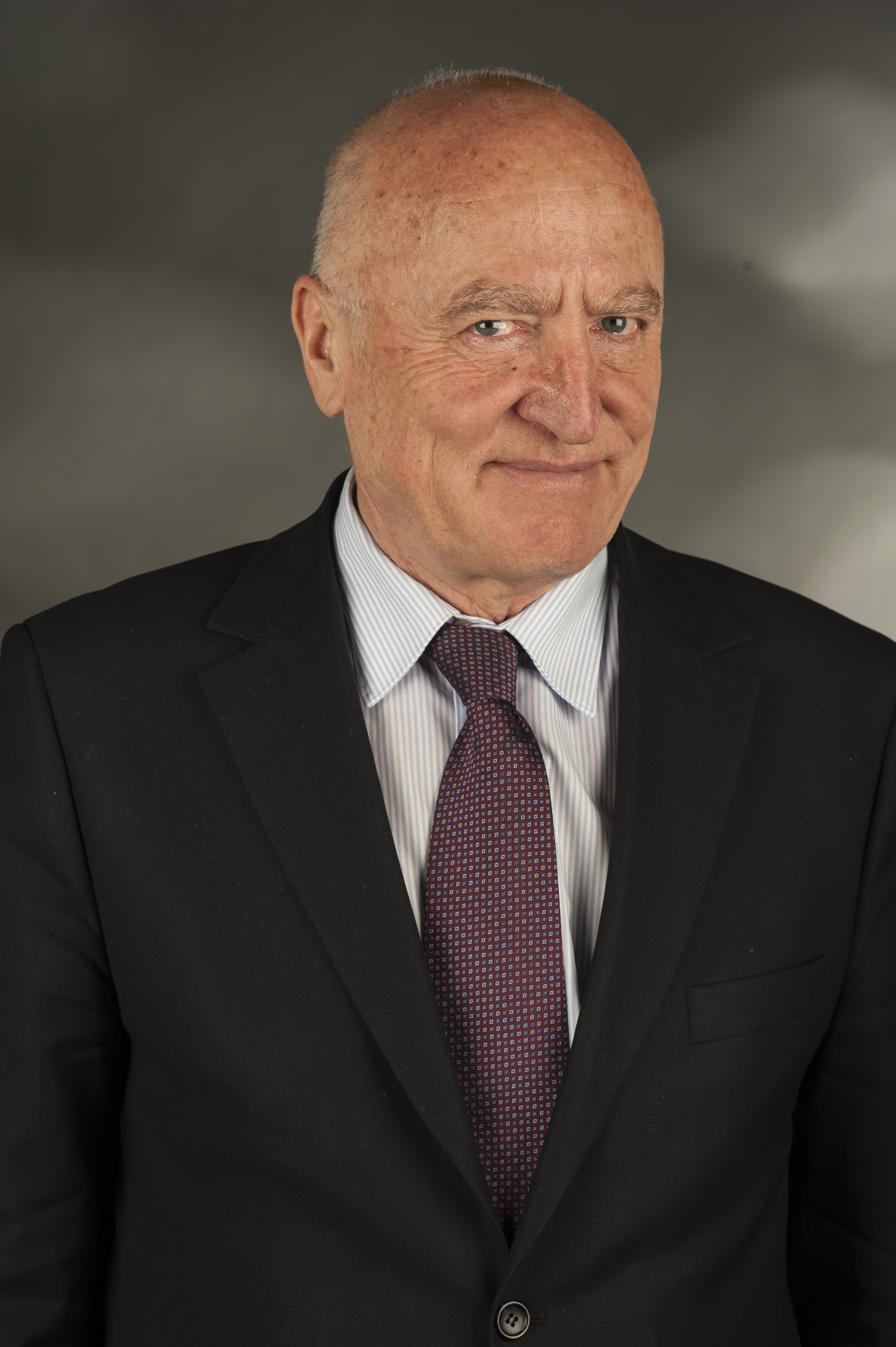

Member of the European Parliament
- In office 1 December 2011 – 2019
- Constituency: Austria

Personal details
- Born: 6 March 1950 (age 76) Sankt Florian am Inn, Austria
- Party: Austrian; Social Democratic Party; EU; Party of European Socialists
- Website: Official website

Josef Weidenholzer (born 6 March 1950) is an Austrian politician who served as Member of the European Parliament (MEP) from 2011 until 2019. He is a member of the Social Democratic Party, part of the Party of European Socialists.

Weidenholzer is a professor of Social Policy and served as Director of the Institute for Social Policy at the Johannes Kepler University Linz. from 1998. Since 1991 he is the President of Volkshilfe Österreich and of the European NGO platform 'Solidar'.

== Life and career ==
After attending Catholic school in the Kremsmünster Abbey, Weidenholzer studied sociology in the Faculty of Social and Economic Sciences at the Johannes Kepler University of Linz from 1968 until 1973. As a student he became actively engaged in the Association for Socialist Students VSStÖ. In 1973 he completed his Magister degree, followed by his doctorate in 1977 and his habilitation in 1982.

Weidenholzer commenced his professional career in 1973 when he worked as a research assistant for the Institute for Modern and Contemporary History at the University of Linz, and as a university assistant at the Institute for Social and Development Studies in 1975. In addition, he has worked for Karl Stadler at the Ludwig Boltzmann Gesellschaft for the History of the Workers Movement, at the University of Linz.

Weidenholzer lectured in academic institutions around the world: in Belgium, Cyprus, the Czech Republic, France, Germany, Great Britain, Hungary, India, Korea, Sweden, Taiwan, the United States, and in Graz and Klagenfurt in Austria. With his reputation thus enhanced, Weidenholzer was appointed Extraordinary University Professor for Societal and Social Policy.

In 1984, Weidenholzer was awarded the Advancement Award by the Victor Adler National Award for the history of social movements. From 1984 until 1998, he was director of the Research Institute for social planning and, from 1998 until 2003, dean of the Faculty of Social Sciences and Economy in Linz.

== Work ==
Josef Weidenholzer's professional focus is on Social Policy, theories of the welfare state, international comparison between welfare- state systems, political theory and international comparative studies on political cultures. He also focuses on the theory and history of social movements, in particular the workers movements and the development of theory and practice. He established the association Museum Arbeitswelt in Steyr, where he was chairman from 1986 until 1993 and conducted the National Exposition ¨Work-Man-Machine¨ (1987), which has been crucial for the permanent installation of the museum.

Josef Weidenholzer is considered to be a convinced European and committed professor. As the president of the Volkshilfe, he fights for social justice and takes a strong public stand on the issue of marginalization. He also politically commits himself to improving the situation of the socially disadvantaged- an issue which is of special concern to him.

== Memberships ==
Weidenholzer stood as a candidate for the Social Democratic Party of Austria (SPÖ) during the European elections in 2009. With the Lisbon Treaty, which resulted in a regulated increase in the number of Members, he became a Member of the European Parliament on 1 December 2011. In 2008, Weidenholzer was a founding member of the Momentum congress and is since, its academic director. He is member of the advisory board of the 2012 founded open access- scientific journal Momentum Quarterly.

== Member of the European Parliament, 2011–2019 ==
Weidenholzer was a Member of the European Parliament from 2011 until 2019. During his time in office, he formed part of the Group of the Progressive Alliance of Socialists and Democrats in the European Parliament (S&D). The emphasis of his work lies in the Committee on Civil Liberties, Justice and Home Affairs (LIBE), in particular concentrating on human rights, asylum, data protection, police and judicial cooperation and the securing of fundamental rights. Within LIBE, he was part of the Rule of Law Monitoring Group (ROLMG) from 2018 until 2019. He was also a deputy member of the Committee on Internal Market and Consumer Protection (IMCO) and a member of the Delegation for relations with Iran. In March 2012, he joined the temporary Special Committee against Organised crime, corruption and money laundering (CRIM).
