= St. Willibald =

St. Willibald may refer to:

- Saint Willibald, 8th-century bishop of Eichstätt
- Sankt Willibald, municipality in Austria
