= Taufkirchen an der Pram =

- Municipality
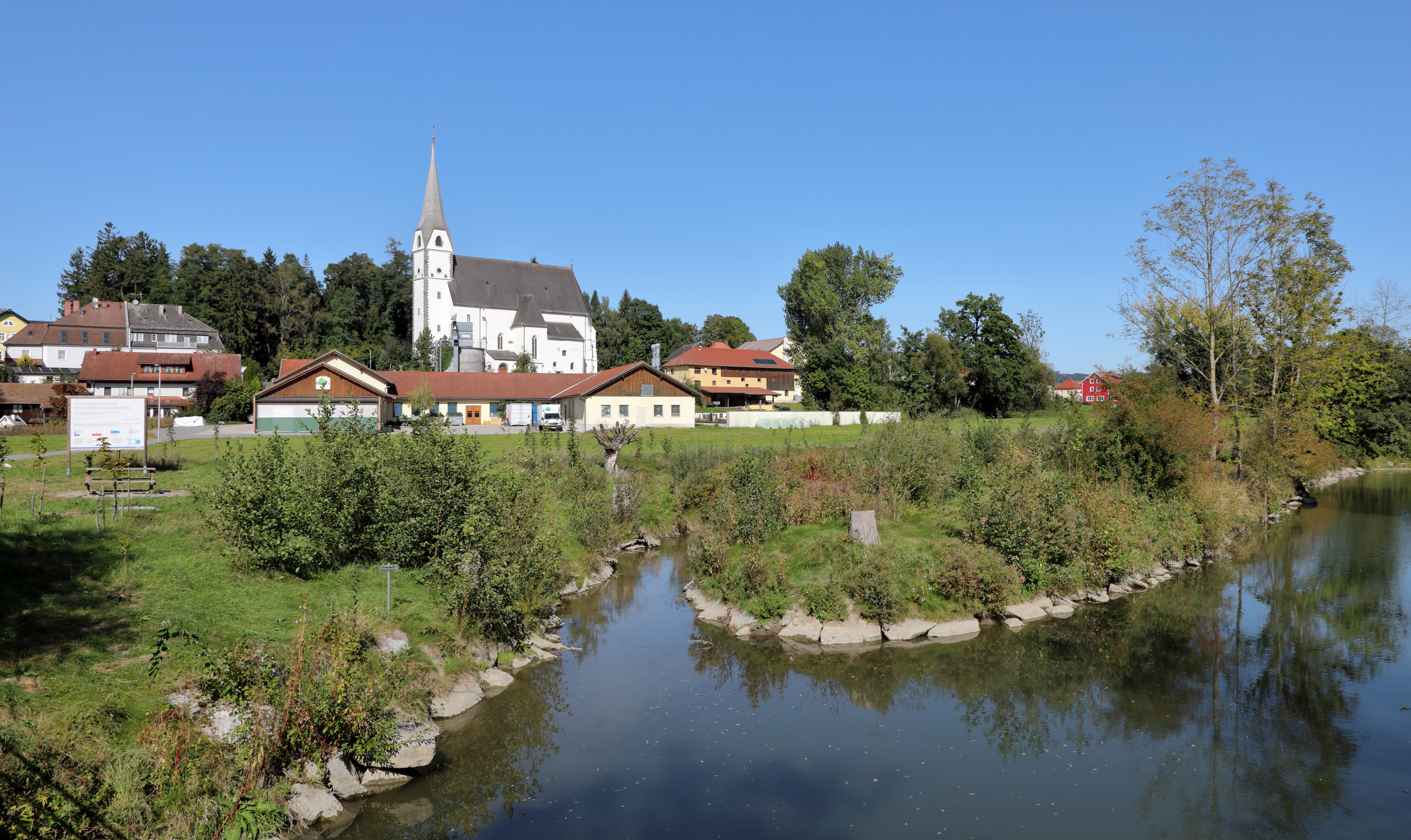

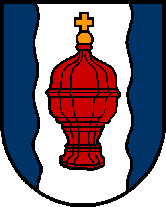
- Coat of arms

- Location within Austria
- Coordinates: 48°25′00″N 13°32′00″E
- Country: Austria
- State: Upper Austria
- District: Schärding

Government
  - Mayor: Paul Freund (ÖVP)

Area
  - Total: 29.17 km^{2} (11.26 sq mi)
- Elevation: 338 m (1,109 ft)

Population (2018-01-01)
  - Total: 2,925
  - Density: 100.3/km^{2} (259.7/sq mi)
- Time zone: UTC+1 (CET)
  - Summer (DST): UTC+2 (CEST)
- Postal code: 4775
- Area code: 07719
- Vehicle registration: SD
- Website: www.taufkirchen-pram.at

Taufkirchen an der Pram is a municipality in the district of Schärding in the Austrian state of Upper Austria.

== Geography ==
Taufkirchen lies in the Innviertel. About 12 percent of the municipality is forest, and 79 percent is farmland.

== Personalities ==
- Peter Kubelka (born 1934), Austrian experimental filmmaker and artist, spent his childhood in Taufkirchen an der Pram
- Josef Mayer (1868-1940), Austrian politician and mayor of Taufkirchen
- Lukas Weißhaidinger (born 1992), athlete, discus thrower, lives in Taufkirchen on the Pram
