= Schardenberg =

Schardenberg Schadnberi
- Municipality
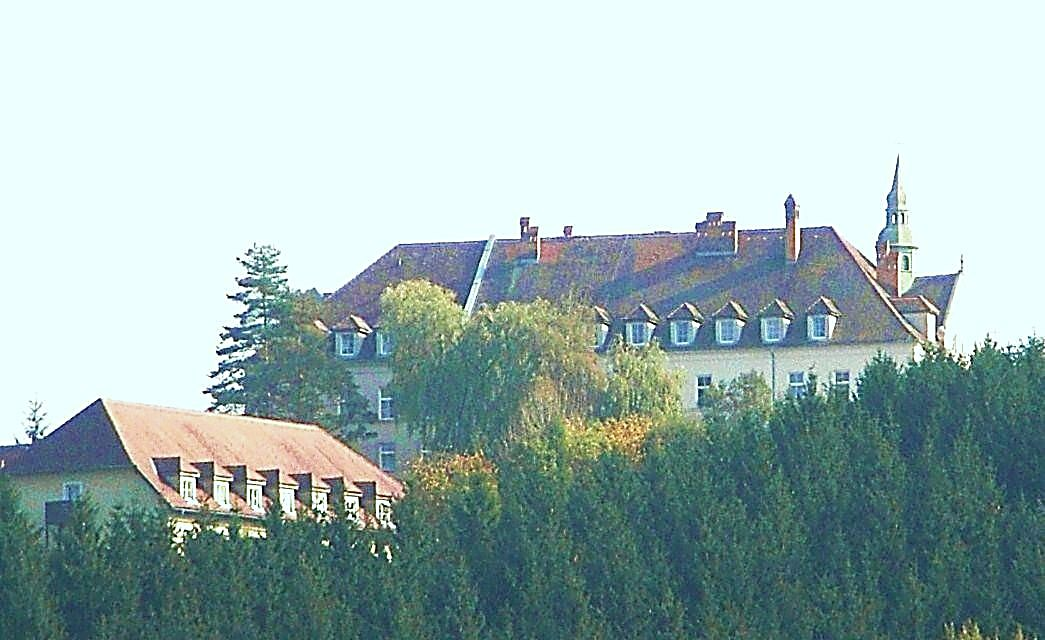
- Hamberg monastery

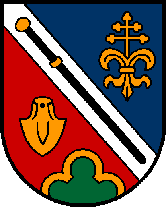
- Coat of arms

- Location within Austria
- Coordinates: 48°31′13″N 13°29′51″E
- Country: Austria
- State: Upper Austria
- District: Schärding

Government
  - Mayor: Josef Schachner (ÖVP)

Area
  - Total: 31.63 km^{2} (12.21 sq mi)
- Elevation: 543 m (1,781 ft)

Population (2018-01-01)
  - Total: 2,407
  - Density: 76.10/km^{2} (197.1/sq mi)
- Time zone: UTC+1 (CET)
  - Summer (DST): UTC+2 (CEST)
- Postal code: 4784
- Area code: 07713
- Vehicle registration: SD
- Website: www.schardenberg.at

Schardenberg (Central Bavarian: Schadnberi) is a municipality in the district of Schärding in the Austrian state of Upper Austria.

In September 1938, the Passau Kreisleiter and Schärding Kreisleiter cordially welcomed Gauleiter August Eigruber in Schardenberg. During a rally at the Hermannseder Inn, Eigruber announced that the adjacent tower will be called Adolf-Hitler-Warte.

== Geography ==
Schardenberg lies in the Innviertel. About 29 percent of the municipality is forest, and 61 percent is farmland.
