= Vichtenstein =

Vichtenstein Viatnstoa
- Municipality
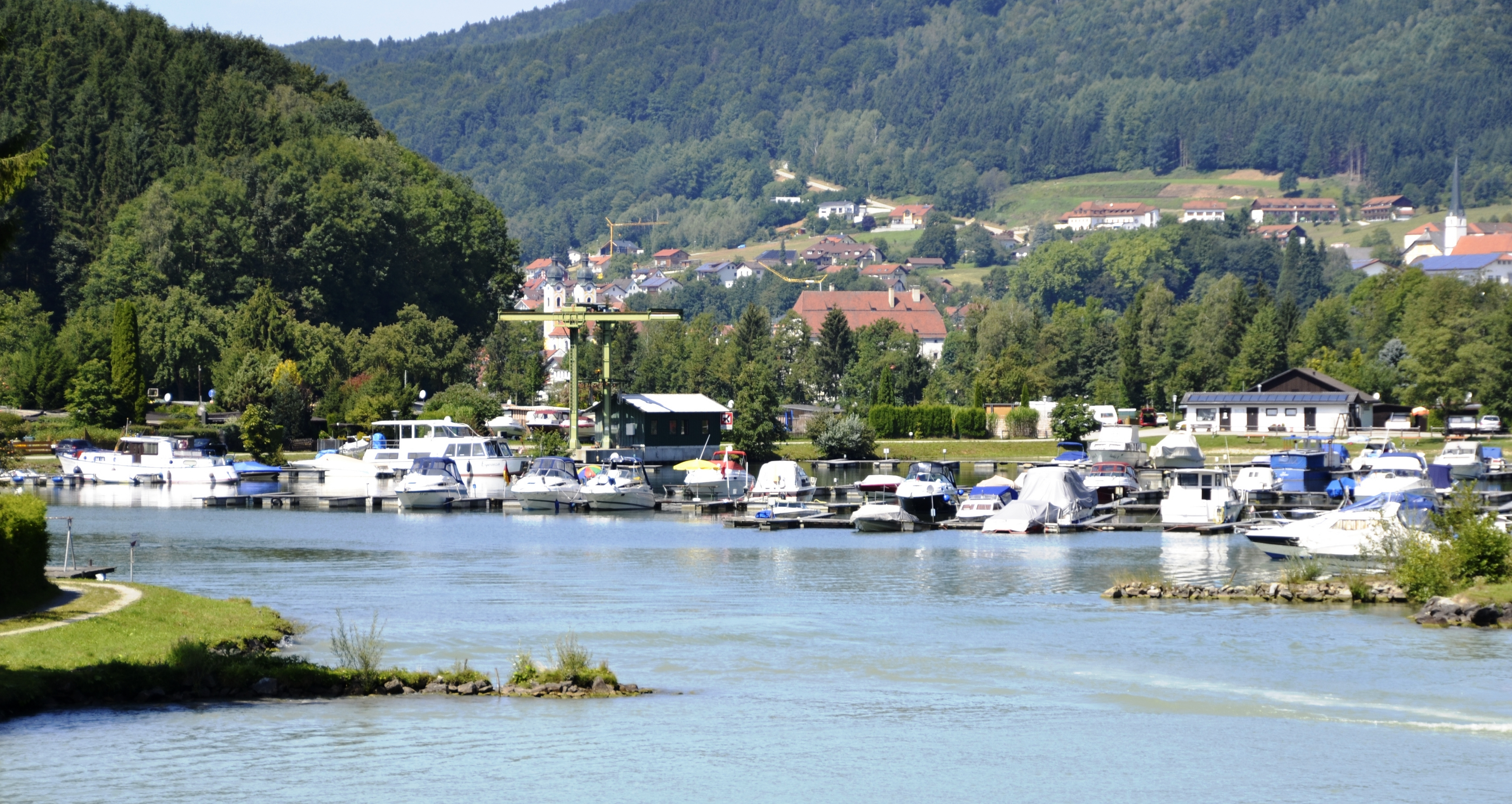

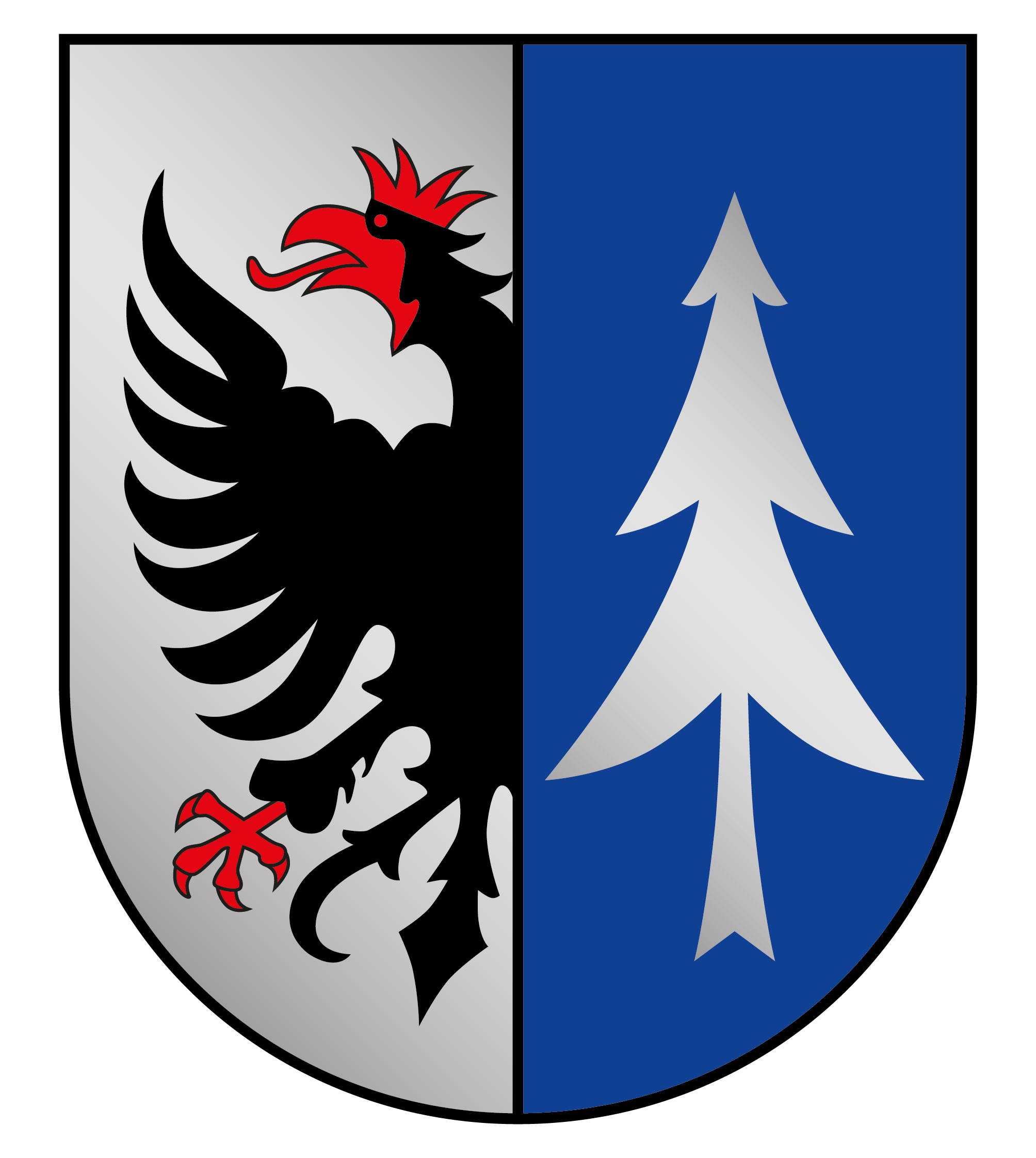
- Coat of arms

- Location within Austria
- Coordinates: 48°32′00″N 13°39′00″E
- Country: Austria
- State: Upper Austria
- District: Schärding

Government
  - Mayor: Martin Friedl (ÖVP)

Area
  - Total: 10.75 km^{2} (4.15 sq mi)
- Elevation: 554 m (1,818 ft)

Population (2018-01-01)
  - Total: 611
  - Density: 56.8/km^{2} (147/sq mi)
- Time zone: UTC+1 (CET)
  - Summer (DST): UTC+2 (CEST)
- Postal code: 4091
- Area code: 07714
- Vehicle registration: SD
- Website: www.vichtenstein. ooe.gv.at

Vichtenstein (Bavarian: Viatnstoa) is a municipality in the district of Schärding in the Austrian state of Upper Austria.

== Geography ==
Vichtenstein lies in the Innviertel. About 60 percent of the municipality is forest, and 29 percent is farmland.
