= Altschwendt =

- Municipality
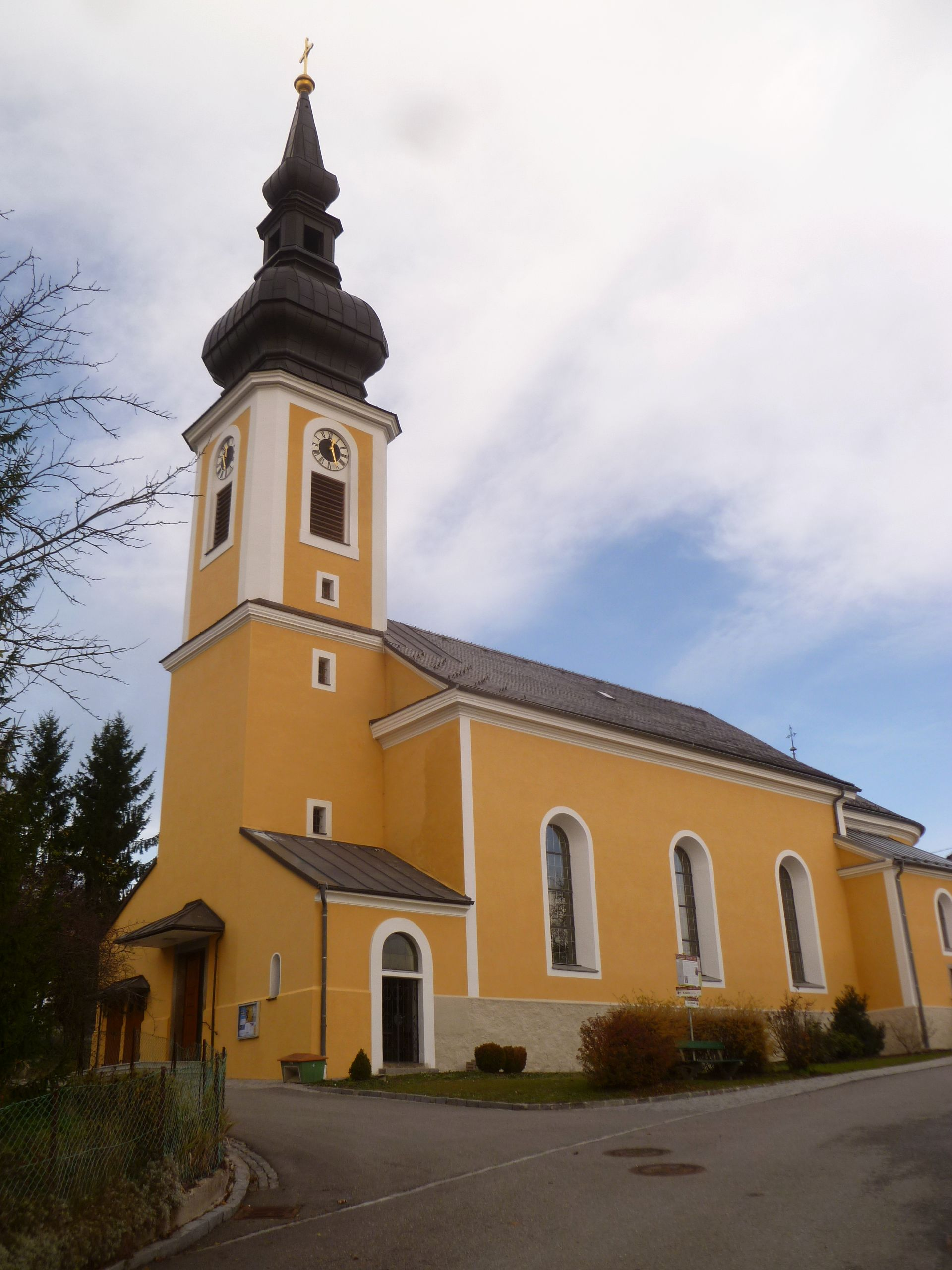

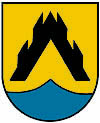
- Coat of arms

- Location within Austria
- Coordinates: 48°19′00″N 13°41′00″E
- Country: Austria
- State: Upper Austria
- District: Schärding

Government
  - Mayor: Josef Söberl (SPÖ)

Area
  - Total: 12.76 km^{2} (4.93 sq mi)
- Elevation: 432 m (1,417 ft)

Population (2018-01-01)
  - Total: 700
  - Density: 55/km^{2} (140/sq mi)
- Time zone: UTC+1 (CET)
  - Summer (DST): UTC+2 (CEST)
- Postal code: 4721
- Area code: 07762
- Vehicle registration: SD
- Website: www.altschwendt.at

Altschwendt is a municipality in the district of Schärding in the Austrian state of Upper Austria.

== Geography ==
Altschwendt lies in the Innviertel. About 13 percent of the municipality is forest, and 80 percent is farmland.

== Demographics ==
In recent years, the population of Altschwendt has shown a slight increase, although it has fluctuated noticeably.

The historical population is given in the following table:

year	population
2002	675
2003	682
2004	666
2005	651
2006	637
2007	630
2008	632
2009	641
2010	643
2011	655
2012	664
2013	669
2014	663
2015	672
2016	708
2017	707
2018	700
2019	697
2020	702
2021	695
2022	718
2023	714
