= Suben =

- Municipality
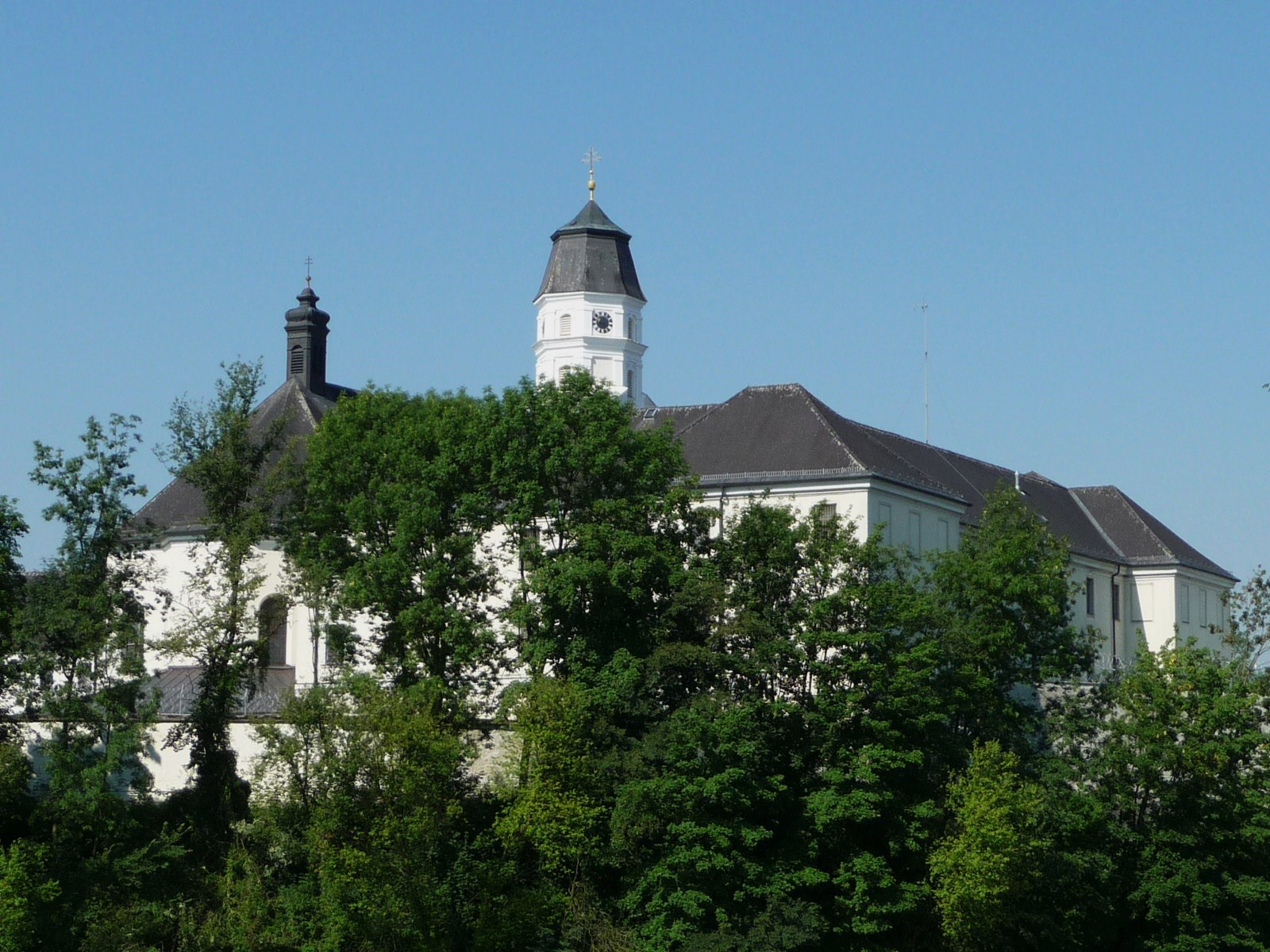

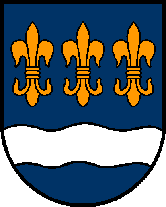
- Coat of arms

- Location within Austria
- Coordinates: 48°25′00″N 13°26′00″E
- Country: Austria
- State: Upper Austria
- District: Schärding

Government
  - Mayor: Ernst Johann Seitz (ÖVP)

Area
  - Total: 6.4 km^{2} (2.5 sq mi)
- Elevation: 329 m (1,079 ft)

Population (2018-01-01)
  - Total: 1,508
  - Density: 240/km^{2} (610/sq mi)
- Time zone: UTC+1 (CET)
  - Summer (DST): UTC+2 (CEST)
- Postal code: 4975
- Area code: 07711
- Vehicle registration: SD
- Website: www.suben.at

Suben is a municipality in the district of Schärding in the Austrian state of Upper Austria. It is not far from the Austrian-German border.

== Geography ==
Suben lies in the Innviertel. About 13 percent of the municipality is forest, and 58 percent is farmland.
