= Enzenkirchen =

Enzenkirchen Enznkira
- Municipality
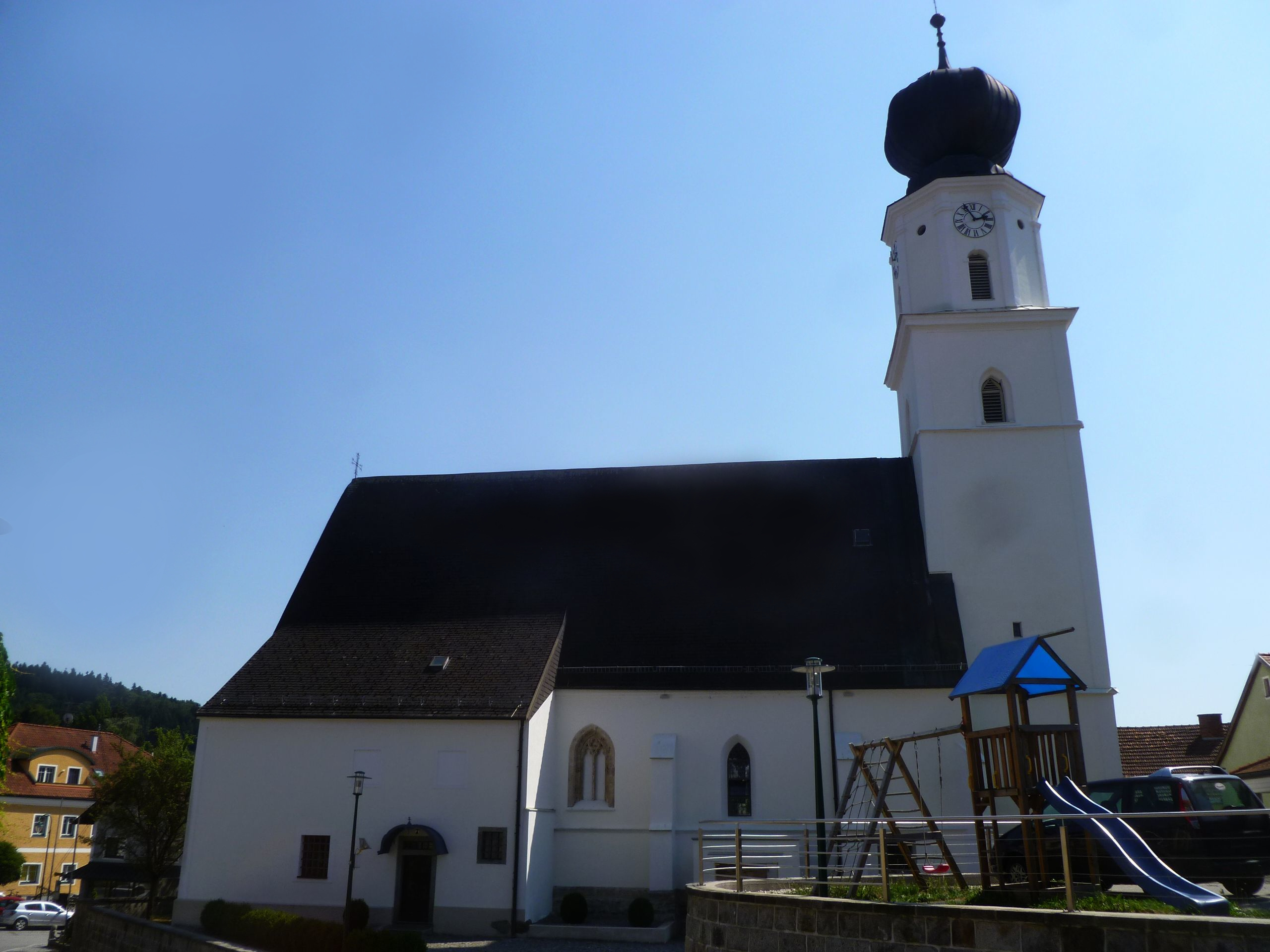

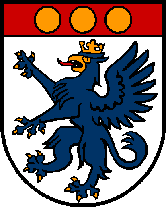
- Coat of arms

- Location within Austria
- Coordinates: 48°23′00″N 13°39′00″E
- Country: Austria
- State: Upper Austria
- District: Schärding

Government
  - Mayor: Franz Hochegger (SPÖ)

Area
  - Total: 23.3 km^{2} (9.0 sq mi)
- Elevation: 373 m (1,224 ft)

Population (2018-01-01)
  - Total: 1,772
  - Density: 76.1/km^{2} (197/sq mi)
- Time zone: UTC+1 (CET)
  - Summer (DST): UTC+2 (CEST)
- Postal code: 4761
- Area code: 07762
- Vehicle registration: SD
- Website: www.enzenkirchen. ooe.gv.at

Enzenkirchen (Central Bavarian: Enznkira) is a municipality in the district of Schärding in the Austrian state of Upper Austria.

== Geography ==
Enzenkirchen lies in the Innviertel. About 22 percent of the municipality is forest, and 70 percent is farmland.
