= Schneider Brot =

- Private
- Headquarters: Raab, Schärding, Upper Austria, Austria
- Website: schneiderbrot.at

Schneider Brot is an Austrian company which makes whole grain rye bread. It is headquartered in Raab, Austria. Its bread is cooked "at very low temperature", and uses no preservatives. It has been called "the very best rye bread" by The Daily Telegraph.
