= Esternberg =

Esternberg Estanbere
- Municipality
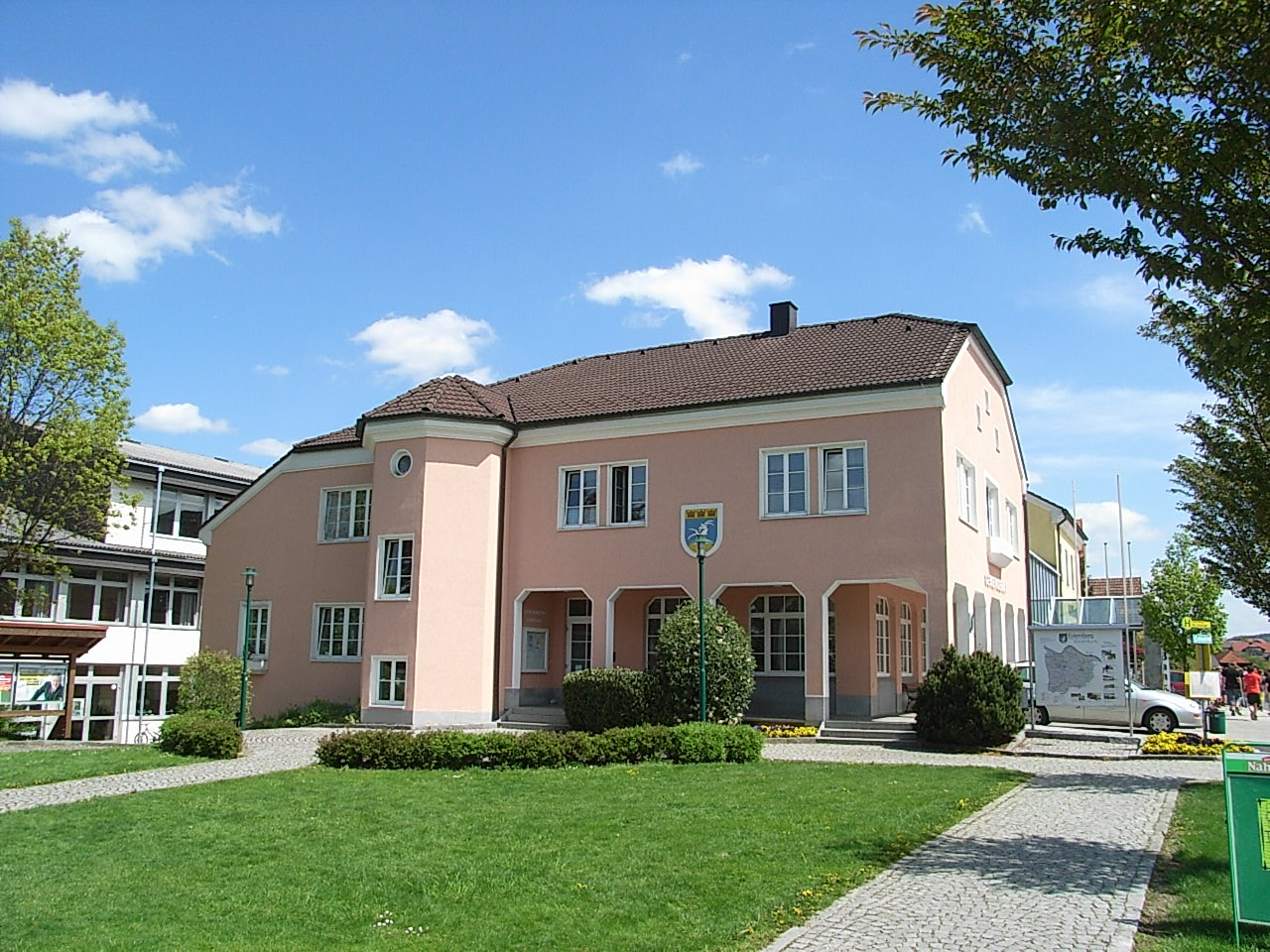
- Municipal office

- Coat of arms

- Location within Austria
- Coordinates: 48°33′00″N 13°34′00″E
- Country: Austria
- State: Upper Austria
- District: Schärding

Government
  - Mayor: Rudolf Haas (ÖVP)

Area
  - Total: 40.26 km^{2} (15.54 sq mi)
- Elevation: 510 m (1,670 ft)

Population (2018-01-01)
  - Total: 2,855
  - Density: 70.91/km^{2} (183.7/sq mi)
- Time zone: UTC+1 (CET)
  - Summer (DST): UTC+2 (CEST)
- Postal code: 4092
- Area code: 07714
- Vehicle registration: SD
- Website: www.esternberg.at

Esternberg (Bavarian: Estanbere) is a municipality in the district of Schärding in the Austrian state of Upper Austria.

== Geography ==
The 23 localities which belong to the municipality are Achleiten, Aug, Dietzendorf, Esternberg, Gersdorf, Hütt, Kösslarn, Kiesling, Lanzendorf, Pfarrhof, Pyrawang, Reisdorf, Riedlbach, Ringlholz, Schörgeneck, Schacher, Silbering, Unteresternberg, Urschendorf, Weeg, Wetzendorf, Winterhof and Zeilberg
