= Brunnenthal, Austria =

Brunnenthal
- Municipality
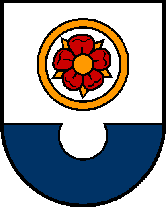
- Coat of arms

- Location within Austria
- Coordinates: 48°28′00″N 13°28′00″E
- Country: Austria
- State: Upper Austria
- District: Schärding

Government
  - Mayor: Roland Wohlmuth (ÖVP)

Area
  - Total: 14.95 km^{2} (5.77 sq mi)
- Elevation: 383 m (1,257 ft)

Population (2018-01-01)
  - Total: 2,032
  - Density: 135.9/km^{2} (352.0/sq mi)
- Time zone: UTC+1 (CET)
  - Summer (DST): UTC+2 (CEST)
- Postal code: 4786
- Area code: 07712
- Vehicle registration: SD
- Website: www.brunnenthal.at

Brunnenthal is a municipality in the district of Schärding in the Austrian state of Upper Austria.

== Geography ==
Brunnenthal lies in the Innviertel. About 21 percent of the municipality is forest, and 67 percent is farmland.
