= Sankt Willibald =

Sankt Willibald Williwoid
- Municipality
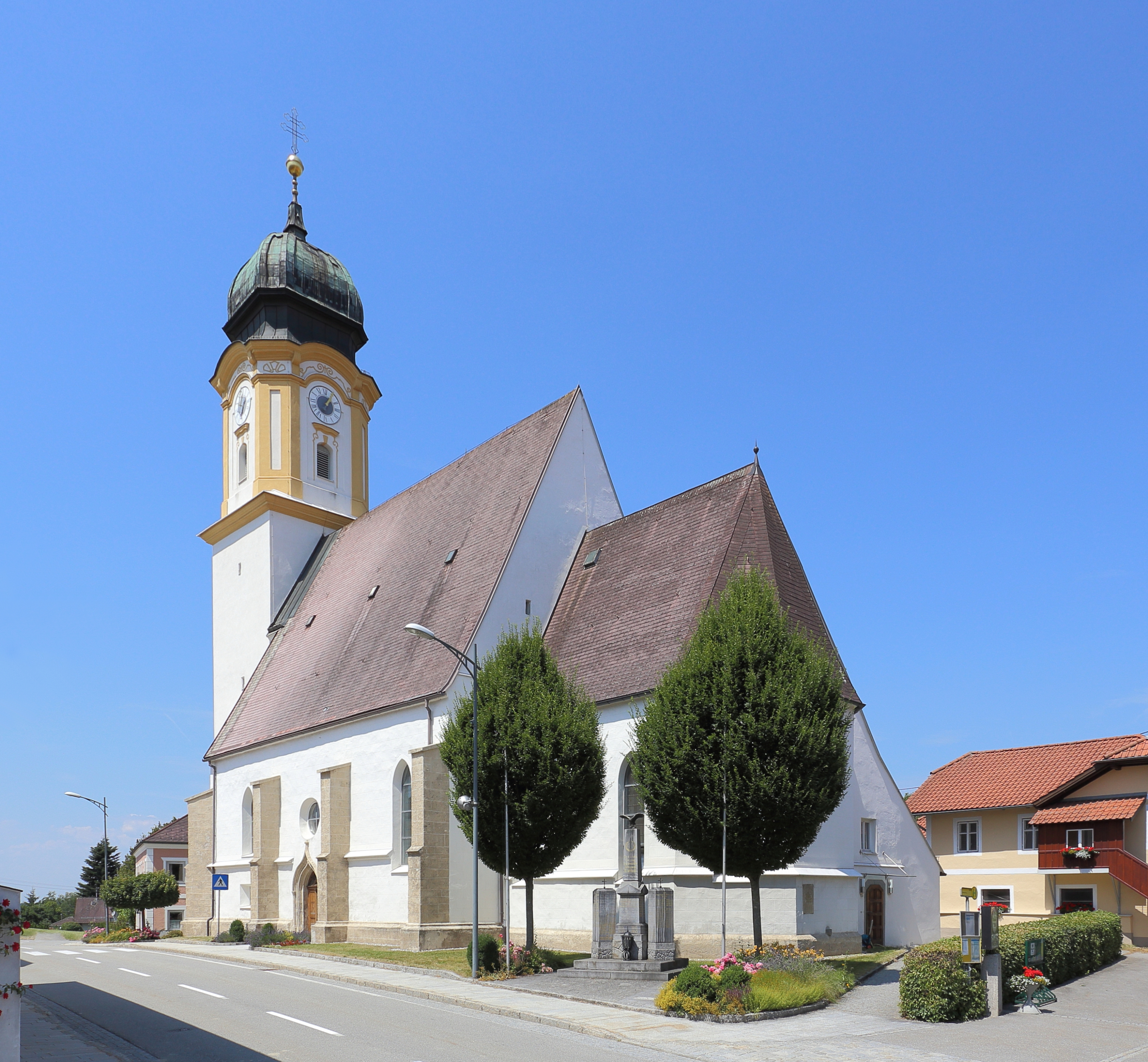

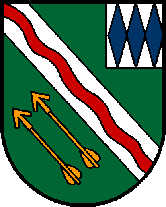
- Coat of arms

- Location within Austria
- Coordinates: 48°22′00″N 13°41′00″E
- Country: Austria
- State: Upper Austria
- District: Schärding

Government
  - Mayor: Josef Jobst (ÖVP)

Area
  - Total: 14.51 km^{2} (5.60 sq mi)
- Elevation: 455 m (1,493 ft)

Population (2018-01-01)
  - Total: 1,100
  - Density: 76/km^{2} (200/sq mi)
- Time zone: UTC+1 (CET)
  - Summer (DST): UTC+2 (CEST)
- Postal code: 4762
- Area code: 07762
- Vehicle registration: SD
- Website: www.oberoesterreich. at/st.willibald

Sankt Willibald, officially St. Willibald (Central Bavarian: Williwoid), is a municipality in the district of Schärding in the Austrian state of Upper Austria.

== Geography ==
Sankt Willibald lies in the Innviertel. About 28 percent of the municipality is forest, and 63 percent is farmland.
