= Braunau Parliament =

The Braunau Parliament (Braunauer Parliament) is the name of the congress on the defence of the state of Bavaria held at Braunau am Inn convened on 21 December 1705, during the War of the Spanish Succession and often seen as the precursor of the Bavarian parliament.

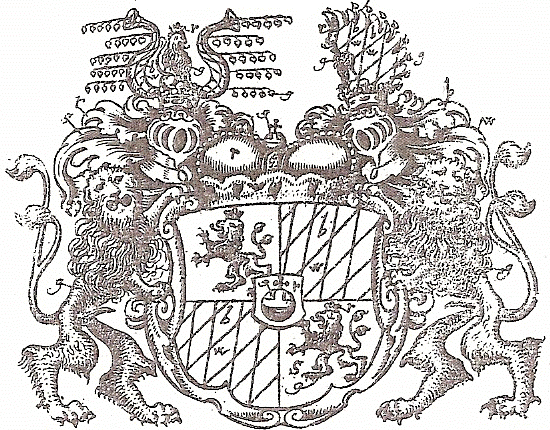
Coat of arms of Duchy of Bavaria

== History ==
The Bavarian national uprising against the imperial occupation of 1705–06 is well-known (in Germany) from the episode of the "Christmas massacre at Sendling" and the folk tale of the Smith of Kochel. It is less well known that this uprising in Upper Bavaria was only a small part of a larger uprising, which dominated huge areas of Lower Bavaria, the area around the Inn River (Innviertel) and the whole of eastern Upper Bavaria. The cities and fortresses lying in these regions were conquered and the rebellion of the peasants encroached on the Bavarian Forest and parts of the Upper Palatinate as well as Kelheim on the Danube.

This, the only genuine rising of the people in Bavarian history, was directed against a foreign rule, which oppressed the whole country, after the banishment of Maximilian II Emanuel, Elector of Bavaria. This genuine uprising reorganized itself as a defender of Bavaria with a large army and summoned the Braunau Parliament.

Long before the French Revolution and early German parliamentarianism this meeting was held, on 21 December 1705, in an inn belonging to the Baron von Paumgarten, where representatives met of the four estates: aristocracy, clergy, burghers and peasants.

== Recent history ==
Between 23 and 25 September 2005, the historical background of the Braunau Parliament of 1705 was analyzed.
