= Diersbach =

- Municipality
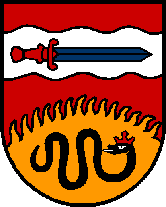
- Coat of arms

- Location within Austria
- Coordinates: 48°25′00″N 13°34′00″E
- Country: Austria
- State: Upper Austria
- District: Schärding

Government
  - Mayor: Walter Steininger (ÖVP)

Area
  - Total: 28.14 km^{2} (10.86 sq mi)
- Elevation: 359 m (1,178 ft)

Population (2018-01-01)
  - Total: 1,583
  - Density: 56.25/km^{2} (145.7/sq mi)
- Time zone: UTC+1 (CET)
  - Summer (DST): UTC+2 (CEST)
- Postal code: 4776
- Area code: 07719
- Vehicle registration: SD
- Website: www.diersbach.at

Diersbach is a municipality in the district of Schärding in the Austrian state of Upper Austria.

== Geography ==
Diersbach lies in the Innviertel. About 13 percent of the municipality is forest, and 78 percent is farmland.
