= Dorf an der Pram =

- Municipality
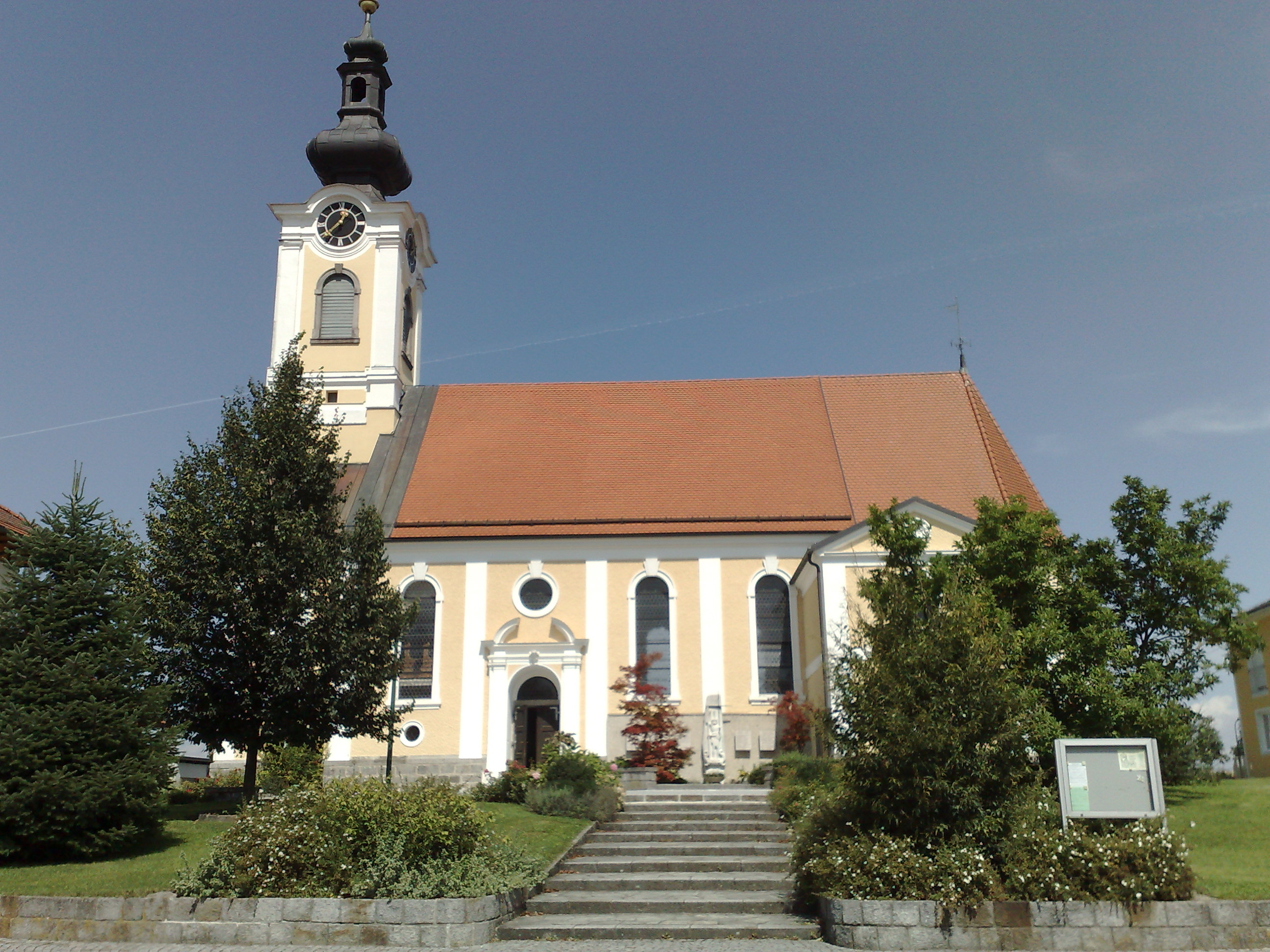

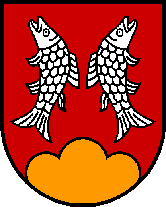
- Coat of arms

- Location within Austria
- Coordinates: 48°16′40″N 13°37′40″E
- Country: Austria
- State: Upper Austria
- District: Schärding

Government
  - Mayor: Thomas Ahörndl (ÖVP)

Area
  - Total: 12.68 km^{2} (4.90 sq mi)
- Elevation: 395 m (1,296 ft)

Population (2018-01-01)
  - Total: 1,039
  - Density: 81.94/km^{2} (212.2/sq mi)
- Time zone: UTC+1 (CET)
  - Summer (DST): UTC+2 (CEST)
- Postal code: 4751
- Area code: 07764
- Vehicle registration: SD
- Website: www.dorf.at

Dorf an der Pram is a municipality in the district of Schärding in the Austrian state of Upper Austria.

== Geography ==
Dorf an der Pram lies in the Innviertel. About 8 percent of the municipality is forest, and 80 percent is farmland.
