= Sankt Aegidi =

- Municipality
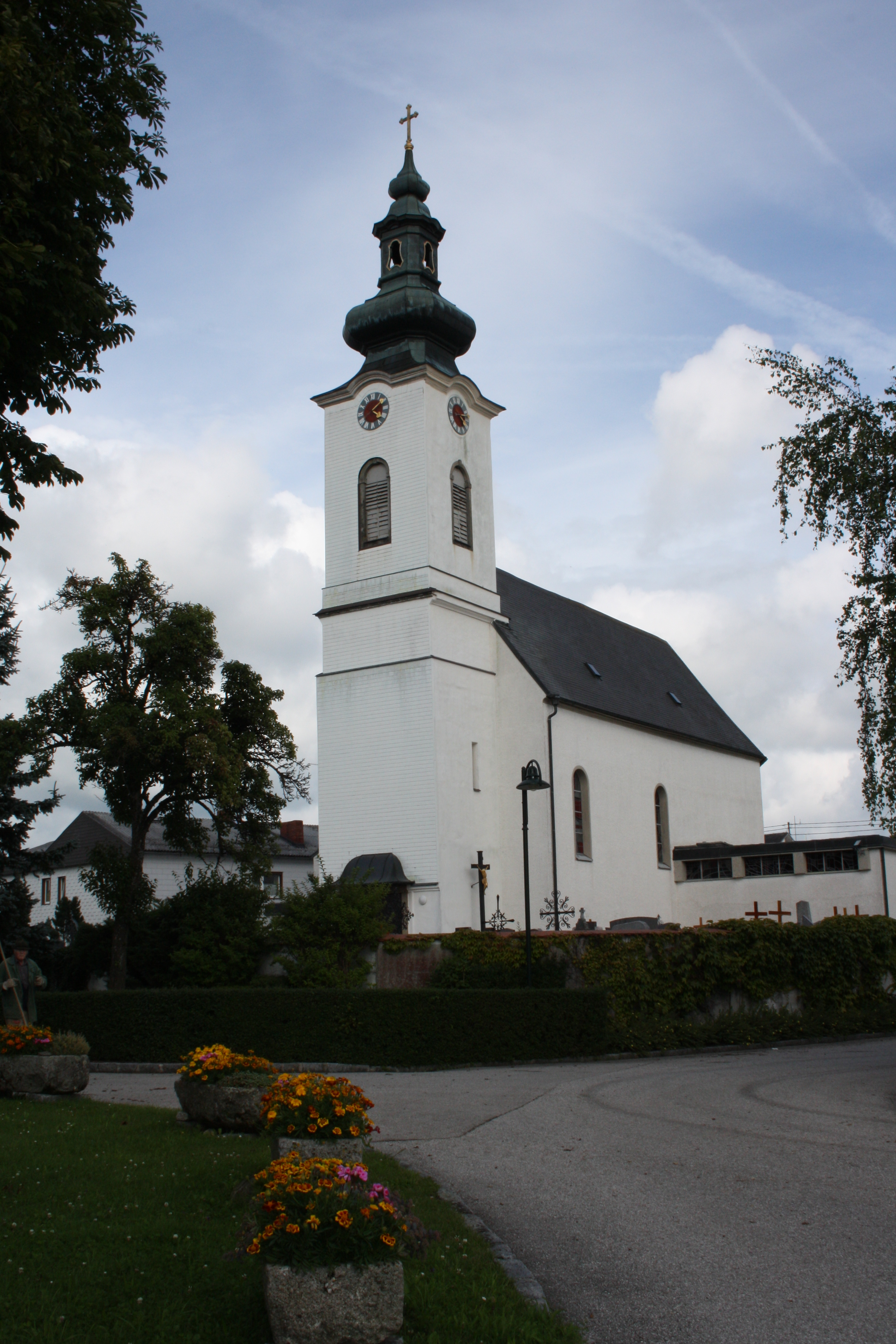

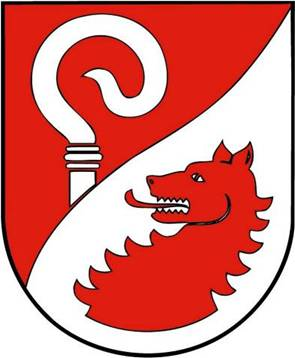
- Coat of arms

- Location within Austria
- Coordinates: 48°29′00″N 13°44′00″E
- Country: Austria
- State: Upper Austria
- District: Schärding

Government
  - Mayor: Eduard Paminger (ÖVP)

Area
  - Total: 28.74 km^{2} (11.10 sq mi)
- Elevation: 599 m (1,965 ft)

Population (2018-01-01)
  - Total: 1,556
  - Density: 54.14/km^{2} (140.2/sq mi)
- Time zone: UTC+1 (CET)
  - Summer (DST): UTC+2 (CEST)
- Postal code: 4725
- Area code: 07717
- Vehicle registration: SD
- Website: www.st-aegidi.at

Sankt Aegidi is a municipality in the district of Schärding in the Austrian state of Upper Austria.

== Geography ==
Sankt Aegidi lies on the Easter edge of the Sau forest. It is only about 1 km from the Danube, as the crow flies. About 37 percent of the municipality is forest, and 58 percent is farmland.
