= Rainbach im Innkreis =

- Municipality
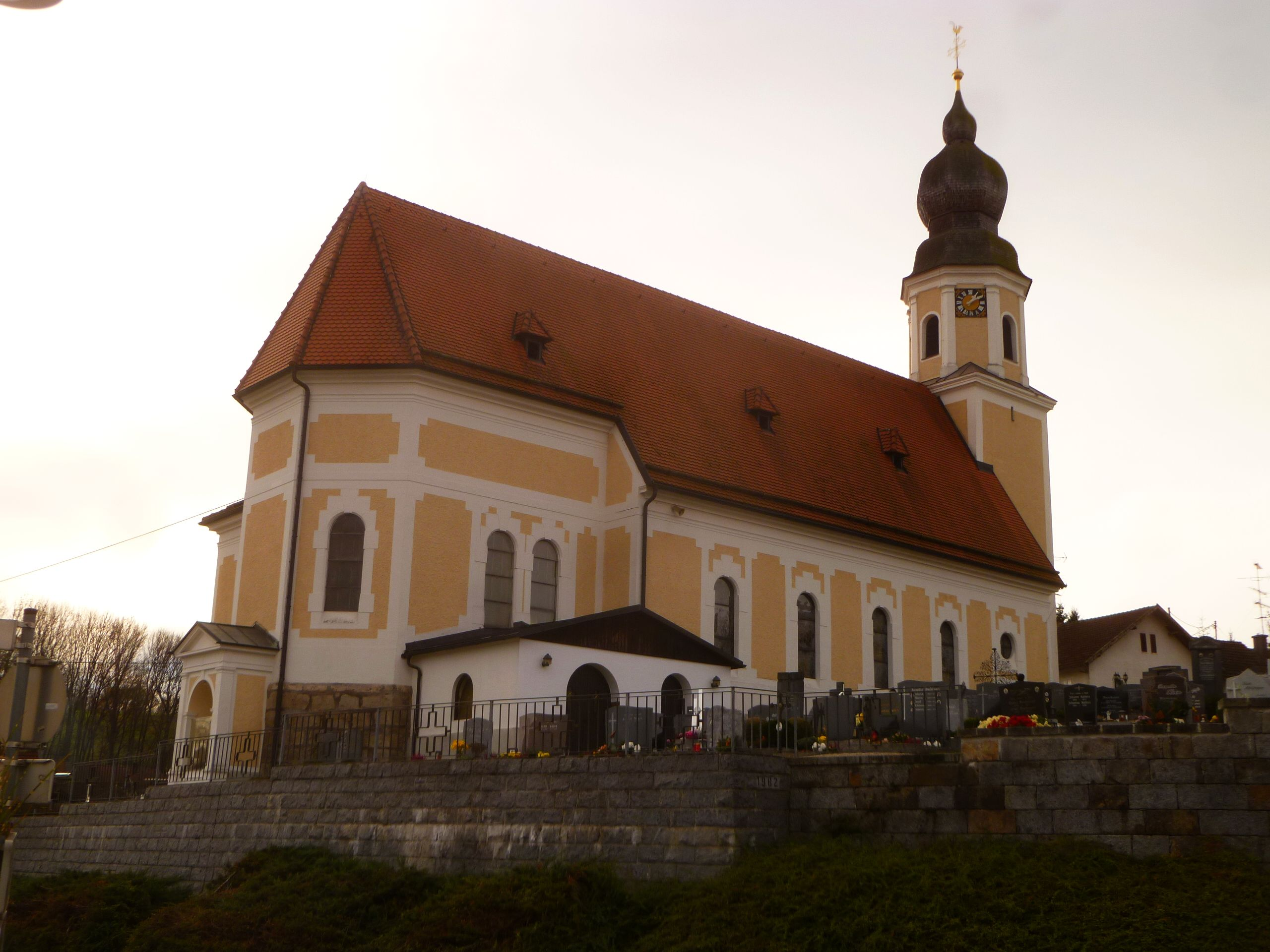

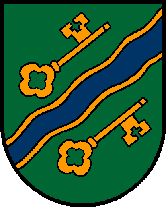
- Coat of arms

- Location within Austria
- Coordinates: 48°27′00″N 13°32′00″E
- Country: Austria
- State: Upper Austria
- District: Schärding

Government
  - Mayor: Alois Gimplinger (ÖVP)

Area
  - Total: 24.42 km^{2} (9.43 sq mi)
- Elevation: 371 m (1,217 ft)

Population (2018-01-01)
  - Total: 1,478
  - Density: 60.52/km^{2} (156.8/sq mi)
- Time zone: UTC+1 (CET)
  - Summer (DST): UTC+2 (CEST)
- Postal code: 4791
- Area code: 07716
- Vehicle registration: SD

Rainbach im Innkreis is a municipality in the district of Schärding in the Austrian state of Upper Austria.

== Geography ==
Rainbach lies in the Innviertel. About 21 percent of the municipality is forest, and 72 percent is farmland.
