= Sankt Roman =

Sankt Roman Sonkt Roma
- Municipality
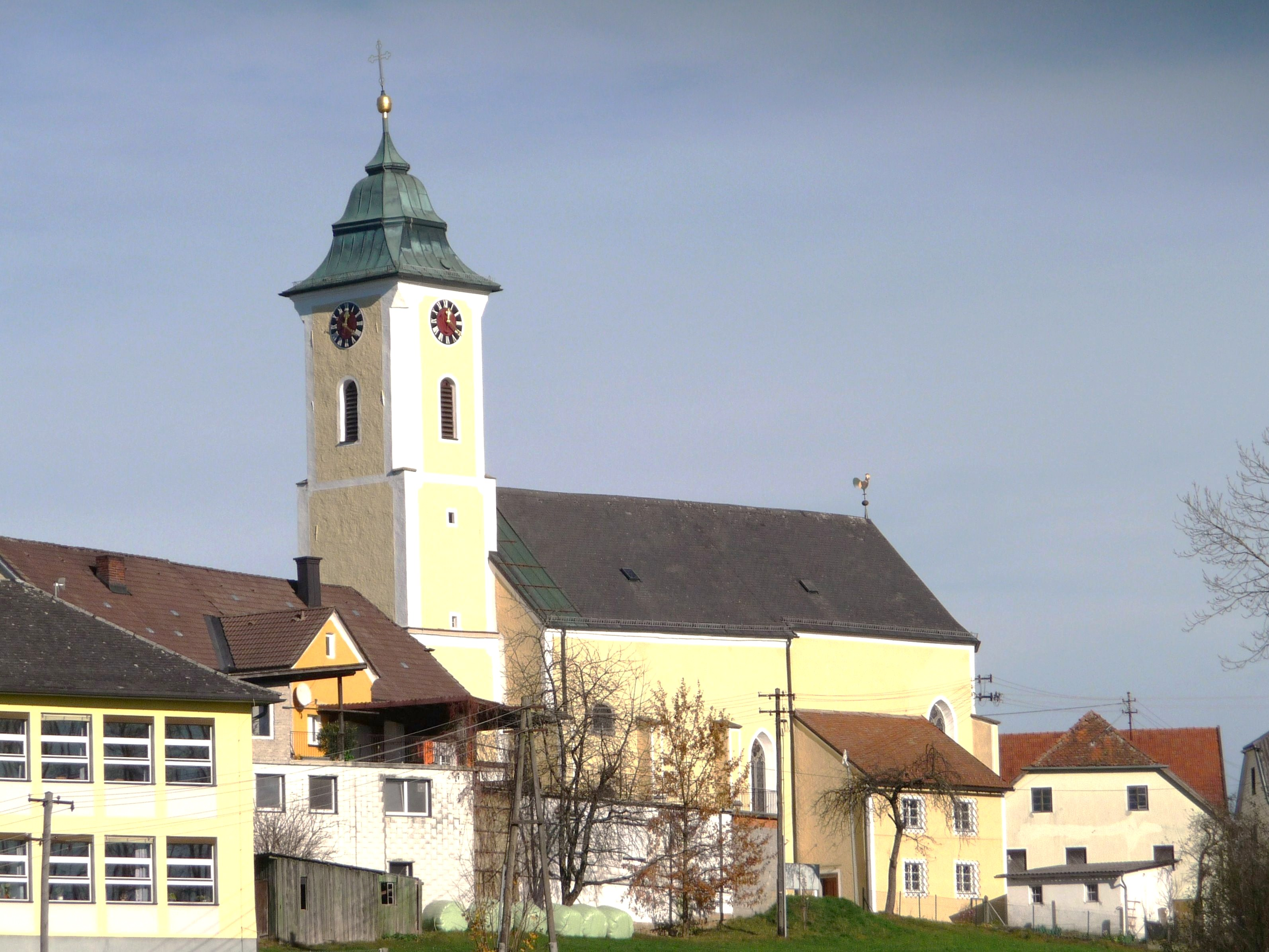

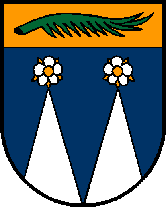
- Coat of arms

- Location within Austria
- Coordinates: 48°28′55″N 13°36′40″E
- Country: Austria
- State: Upper Austria
- District: Schärding

Government
  - Mayor: Siegfried Berlinger (BZÖ)

Area
  - Total: 31.78 km^{2} (12.27 sq mi)
- Elevation: 569 m (1,867 ft)

Population (2018-01-01)
  - Total: 1,711
  - Density: 53.84/km^{2} (139.4/sq mi)
- Time zone: UTC+1 (CET)
  - Summer (DST): UTC+2 (CEST)
- Postal code: 4793
- Area code: 07716
- Vehicle registration: SD
- Website: www.st-roman.at

Sankt Roman, (Bavarian: Sonkt Roma or just Roma) officially St. Roman, is a municipality in the district of Schärding in the Austrian state of Upper Austria.

== Geography ==
Sankt Roman lies on the south side of the Sau forest. About 38 percent of the municipality is forest, and 57 percent is farmland.
