= Raab, Austria =

Raab
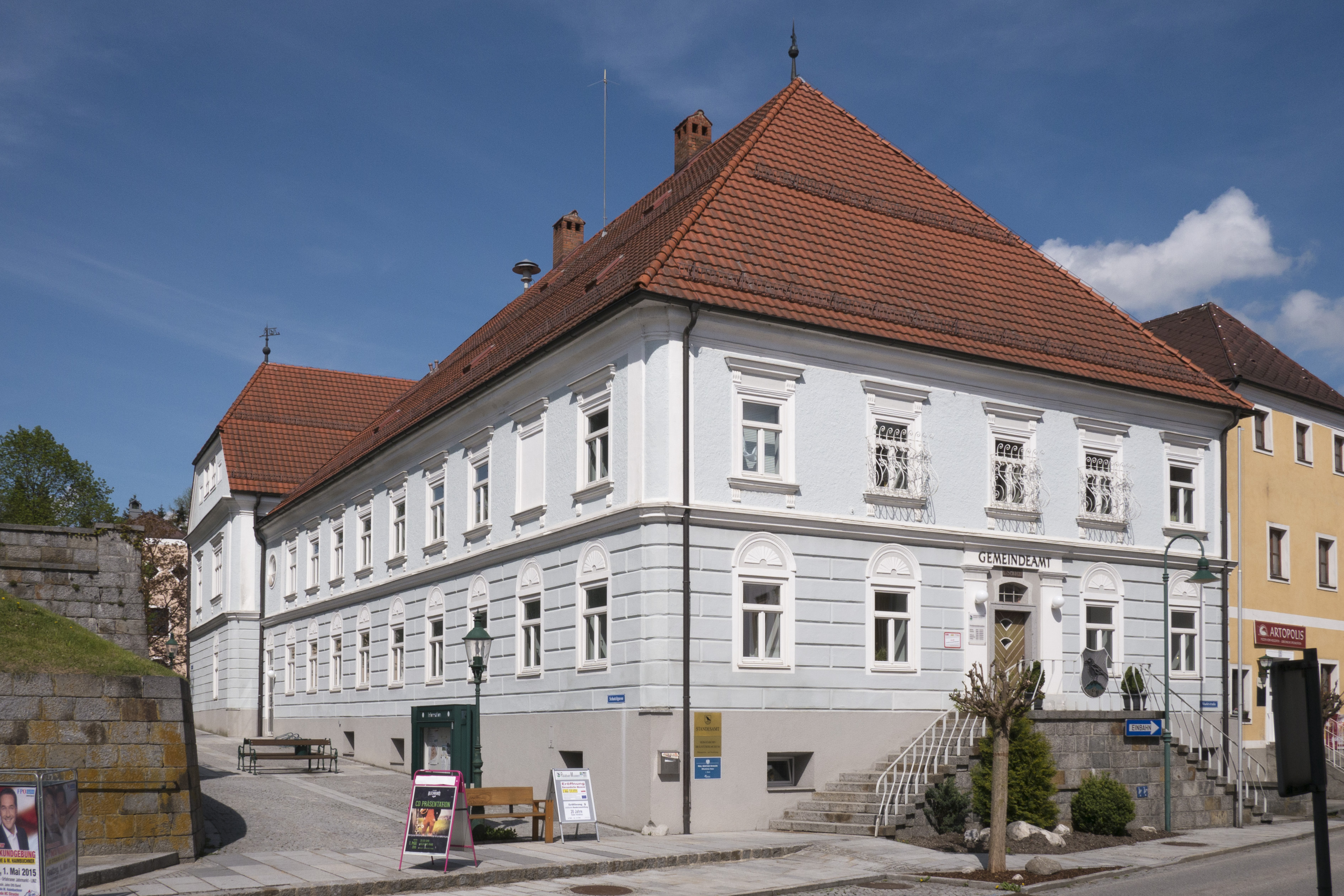
- Market hall

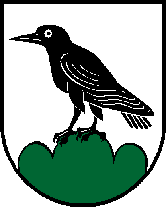
- Coat of arms

- Location within Austria
- Coordinates: 48°21′00″N 13°39′00″E
- Country: Austria
- State: Upper Austria
- District: Schärding

Government
  - Mayor: Agnes Reiter (/)

Area
  - Total: 22.46 km^{2} (8.67 sq mi)
- Elevation: 381 m (1,250 ft)

Population (2018-01-01)
  - Total: 2,270
  - Density: 101/km^{2} (262/sq mi)
- Time zone: UTC+1 (CET)
  - Summer (DST): UTC+2 (CEST)
- Postal code: 4760
- Area code: 07762
- Vehicle registration: SD
- Website: www.raab.ooe.gv.at

Raab is a market town (Marktgemeinde) in the district of Schärding in Upper Austria in Austria.

== History ==
The village historically belonged to the Duchy of Bavaria until the Treaty of Teschen transferred the area to Austria in 1780. During the Napoleonic Wars it was restored to Bavaria until 1814.

Ernst Kaltenbrunner spent several formative years growing up in this town before World War I. After the annexation of Austria into the Third Reich on 13 March 1938, the entire region was incorporated into the Gau Oberdonau (Upper Danube) under SS Standartenführer August Eigruber until 1945.

Joseph Plowman (1857–1929), Titular Archbishop, Auxiliary Bishop and Vicar General in Vienna, and Alois Jungwirth (1884–1946), Member of Parliament, were both born here.
