= Sankt Florian am Inn =

- Municipality
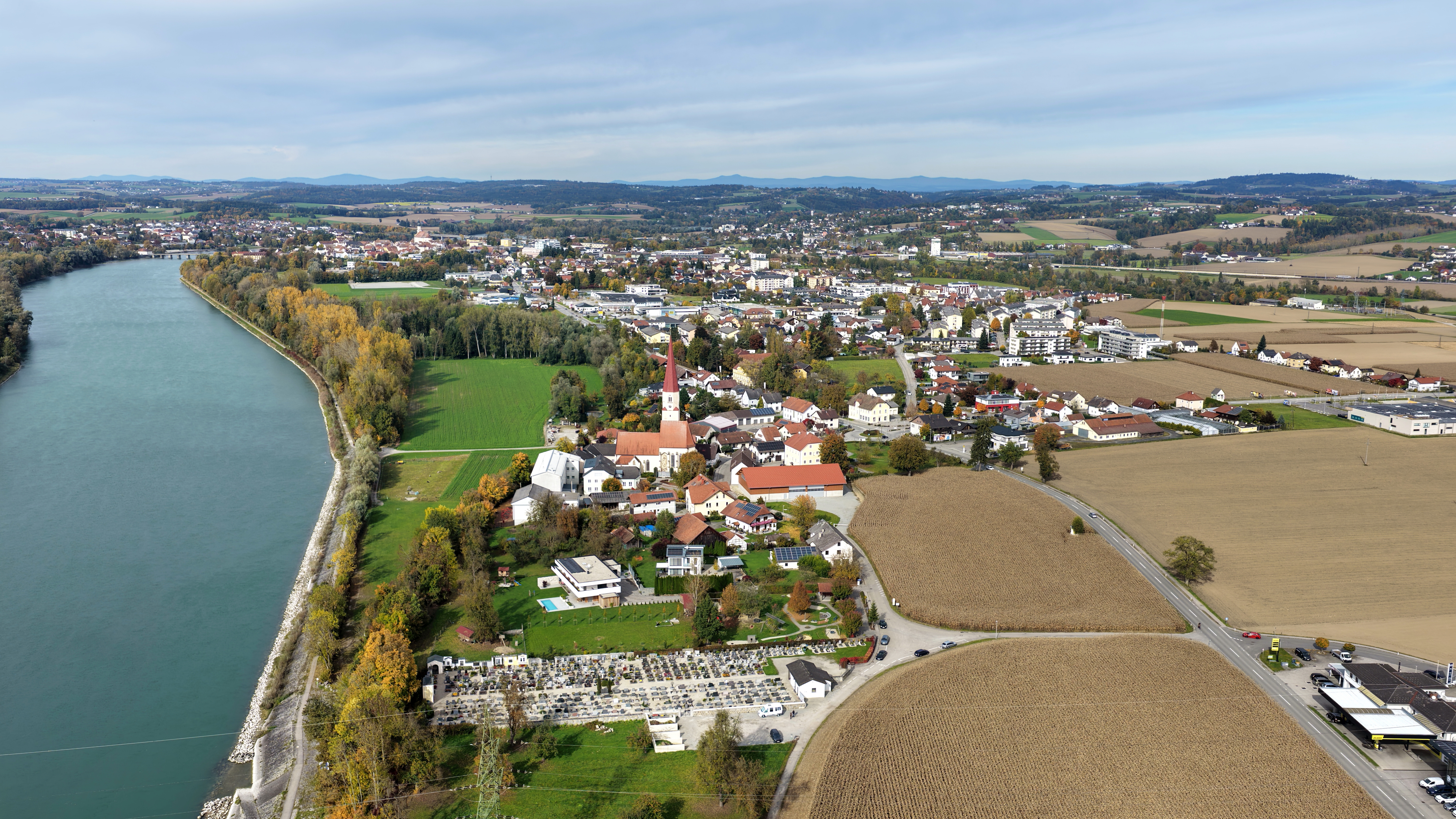
- South view of St. Florian am Inn

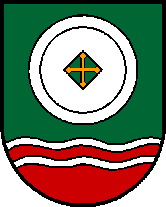
- Coat of arms

- Location within Austria
- Coordinates: 48°26′00″N 13°26′28″E
- Country: Austria
- State: Upper Austria
- District: Schärding

Government
  - Mayor: Bernhard Brait (ÖVP)

Area
  - Total: 24.16 km^{2} (9.33 sq mi)
- Elevation: 321 m (1,053 ft)

Population (2018-01-01)
  - Total: 3,150
  - Density: 130/km^{2} (338/sq mi)
- Time zone: UTC+1 (CET)
  - Summer (DST): UTC+2 (CEST)
- Postal code: 4782
- Area code: 07712, 07719
- Vehicle registration: SD
- Website: www.st-florian-inn.at

Sankt Florian am Inn is a municipality in the district of Schärding in the Austrian state of Upper Austria.

== Geography ==
Sankt Florian lies in the Innviertel. About 19 percent of the municipality is forest, and 64 percent is farmland.
