= Schärding District =

Coordinates: 48.440°N 13.578°E

Schärding District Bezirk Schärding
- District
- Country: Austria
- State: Upper Austria
- Number of municipalities: 30
- Administrative seat: Schärding

Government
  - District Governor: Florian Kolmhofer

Area
  - Total: 618.5 km^{2} (238.8 sq mi)

Population (2026)
  - Total: 58,157
  - Density: 94.03/km^{2} (243.5/sq mi)
- Time zone: UTC+01:00 (CET)
  - Summer (DST): UTC+02:00 (CEST)
- Vehicle registration: SD

Bezirk Schärding (Bavarian: Beziak Scharing) is a district of the state of Upper Austria in Austria.

== Municipalities ==
Towns (Städte) are indicated in boldface; market towns (Marktgemeinden) in italics; suburbs, hamlets and other subdivisions of a municipality are indicated in small characters.

- Altschwendt
- Andorf
- Brunnenthal
- Diersbach
- Dorf an der Pram
- Eggerding
- Engelhartszell
- Enzenkirchen
- Esternberg
- Freinberg
- Kopfing im Innkreis
- Mayrhof
- Münzkirchen
- Raab
- Rainbach im Innkreis
- Riedau
- Schardenberg
- **Schärding**
- Sigharting
- Sankt Aegidi
- Sankt Florian am Inn
- Sankt Marienkirchen bei Schärding
- Sankt Roman
- Sankt Willibald
- Suben
- Taufkirchen an der Pram
- Vichtenstein
- Waldkirchen am Wesen
- Wernstein am Inn
- Zell an der Pram
