= Innviertel =

Traditional region of Upper Austria

Coordinates: 48°18′N 13°24′E

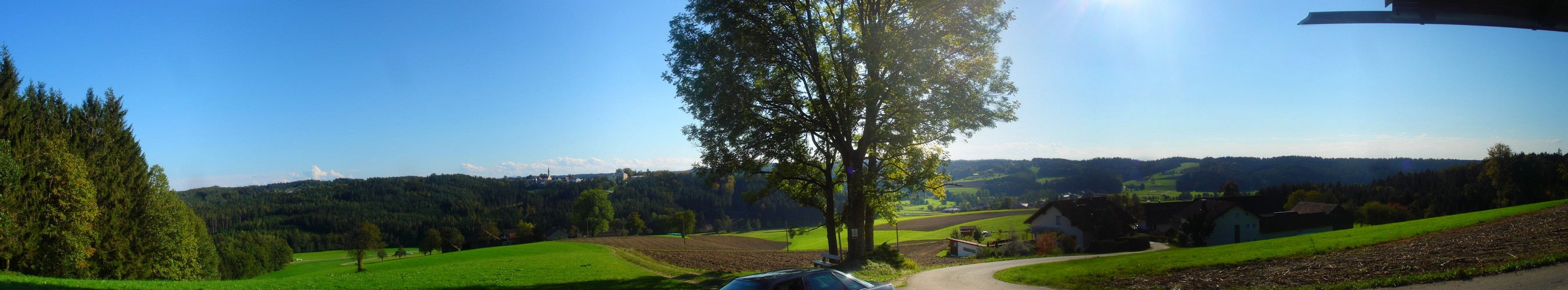
Landscape around Maria Schmolln

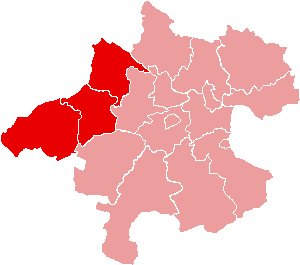
Map of Innviertel in the state of Upper Austria

The Innviertel (literally German for "Inn Quarter"; officially called the Innkreis; Bavarian: Innviadl) is a traditional Austrian region southeast of the Inn river. It forms the western part of the state of Upper Austria and borders the German state of Bavaria. The Innviertel is one of the four traditional "quarters" of Upper Austria, the others being Hausruckviertel, Mühlviertel, and Traunviertel.

The Innviertel is the northwestern quarter of Upper Austria and includes the districts Braunau am Inn, Ried im Innkreis and Schärding. Since the formation of the political districts in 1868, the quarters in Upper Austria no longer have a legal basis and are purely regional names. The older Habsburg districts (Kreise), which were still based on the old quarters, were superseded.

Unlike the rest of Upper Austria, most of the area was part of Duchy and, later, Electorate of Bavaria until the 1779 Treaty of Teschen. It is a fertile, densely populated, flat to hilly landscape that is part of the Alpine foothills and lies between the rivers Salzach, Inn, Danube and the Hausruck hills. The Innviertel covers an area of around 2250 km^{2} and its population is just under 218,000.

The largest city in the Innviertel in terms of area and inhabitants is Braunau am Inn with 17,438 inhabitants, followed by Ried im Innkreis (12,209). The town of Schärding with 5,216 inhabitants is well-known as a tourist centre because of its baroque town centre.

== Name ==
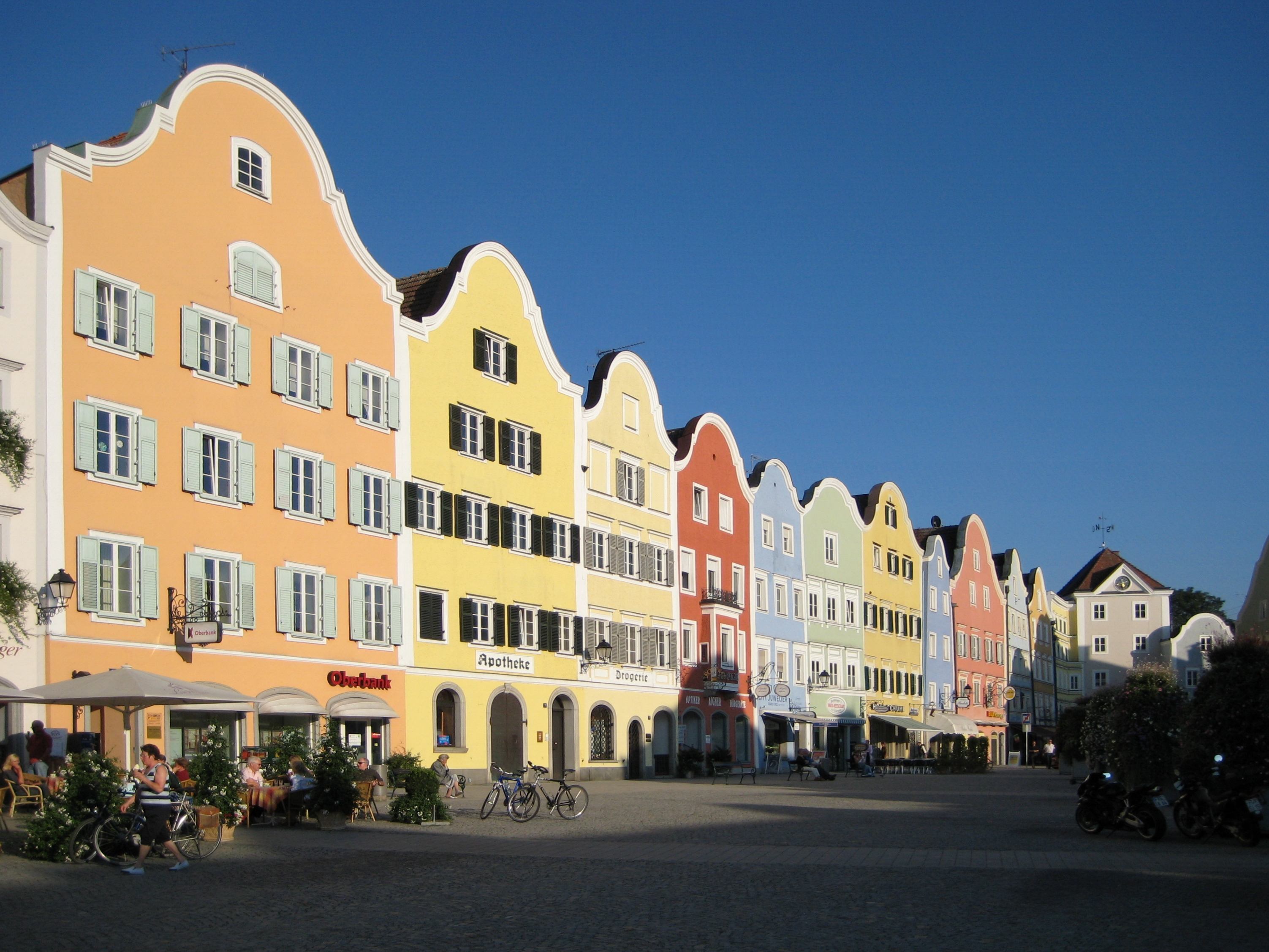
Baroque "Silberzeile" in Schärding

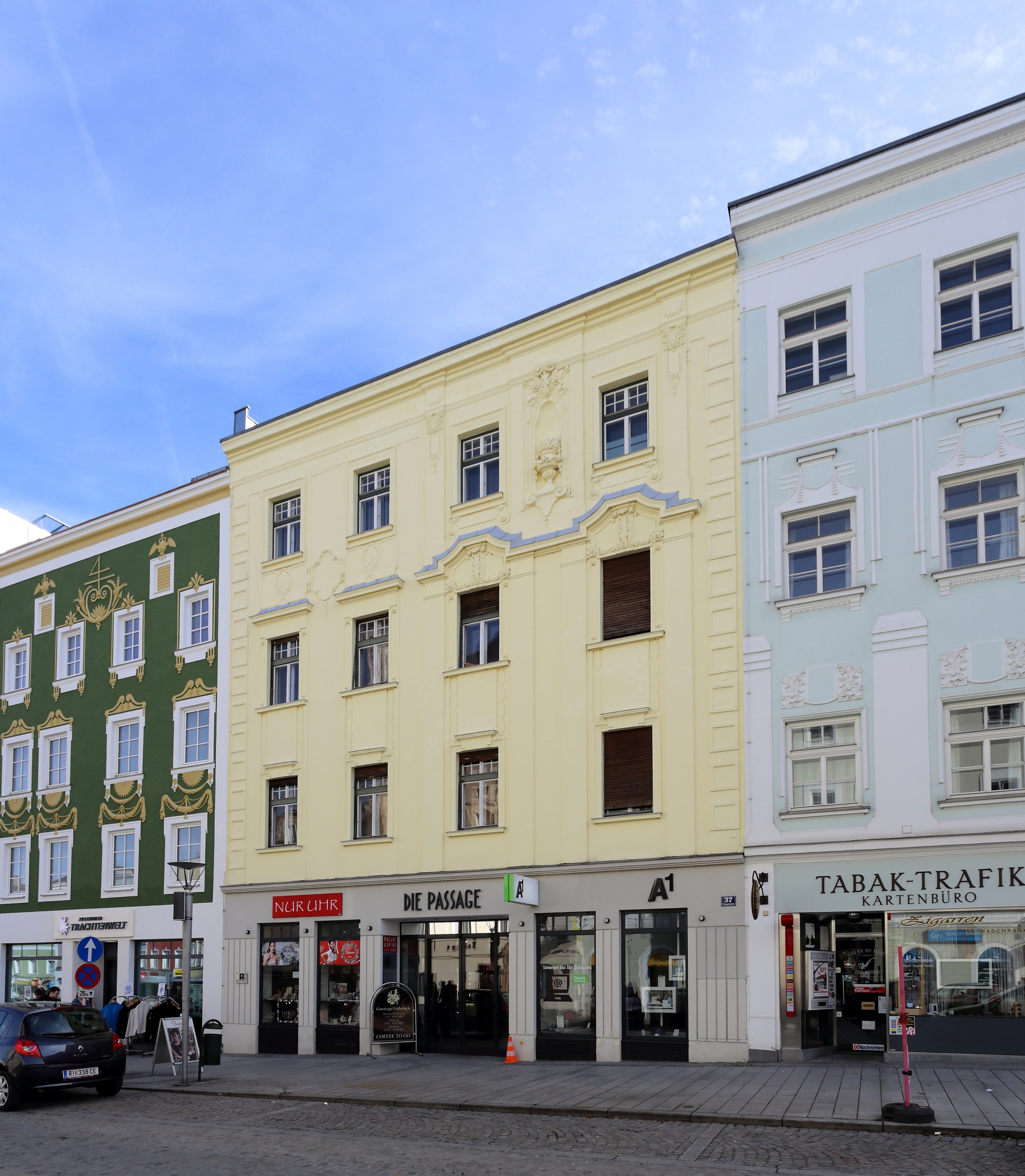
Town houses in the Inn-Salzach Style, in Ried im Innkreis

The name Innviertel for the region dates from after its incorporation into Austria in 1779; before then, it was part of Bavaria and its name was Innbaiern ("Inn-Bavaria").

In 1779, when the region was incorporated into Austria – specifically into the Archduchy of Österreich ob der Enns ("Austria above the Enns"), the precursor of today's state of Upper Austria – the newly-acquired area was initially referred to as the Fünfte Viertel ("Fifth Quarter") as the Archduchy had been previously divided into four quarters. It was only after the amalgamation of the historical Mühlviertel and Machlandviertel into the modern Mühlviertel that the area became known as the Innviertel.

== Geography ==
The quarter spans the Austrian political districts of Schärding, Ried im Innkreis and Braunau am Inn. Major towns in Innviertel include the district capitals Braunau am Inn, Ried im Innkreis and Schärding as well as Mattighofen and Altheim.

Located within the Alpine foothills, the rural Innviertel is approximately 2,250 km^{2} (870 sq mi) in area and comprises the broad Inn valley, which is largely flat and fertile, and the adjacent undulating landscape in the east, which is rich in granite in the north and coal.

== History ==
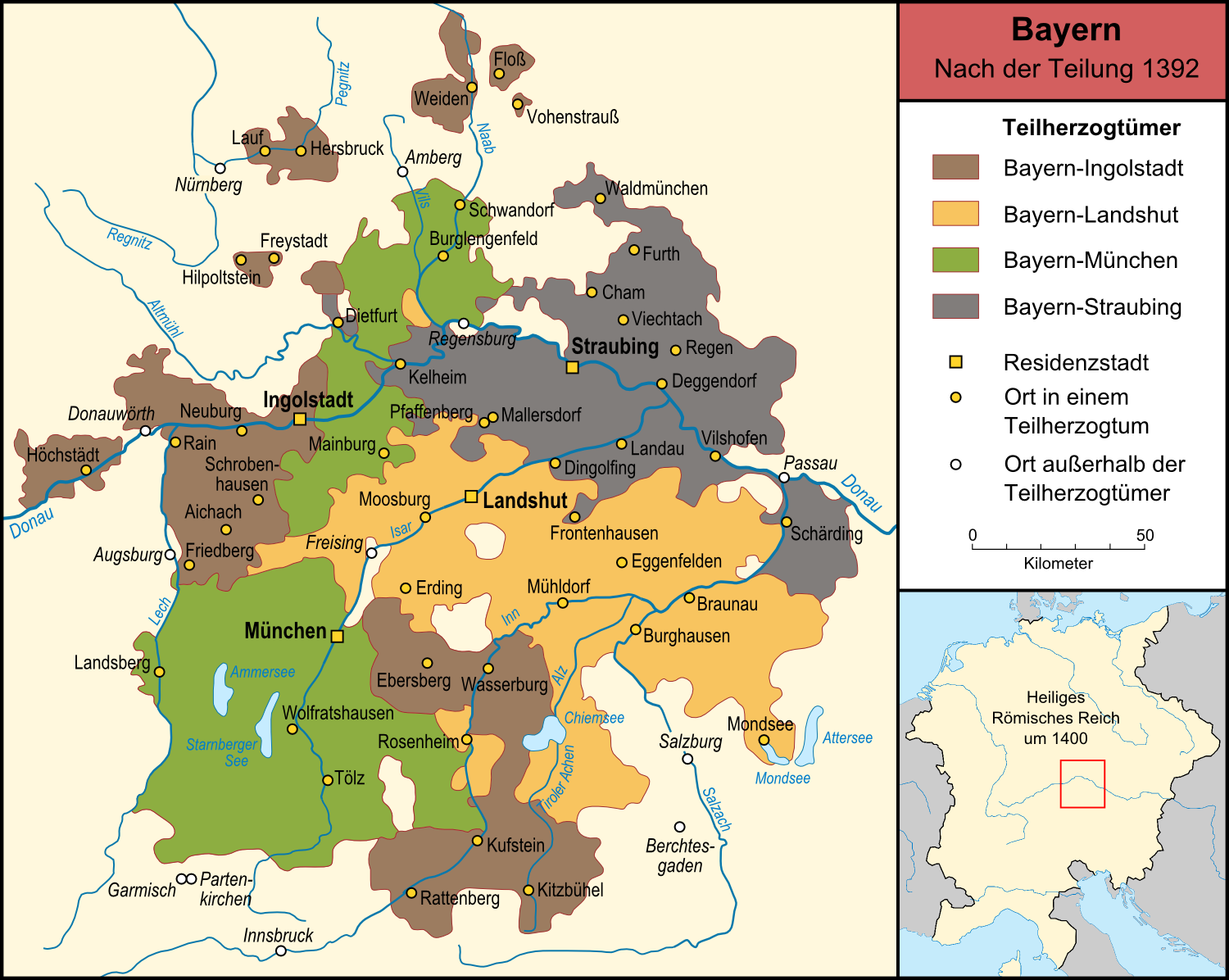
The Innviertel after the division of Bavaria in 1392 into the partial duchies of Bavaria-Ingolstadt, Bavaria-Landshut, Bavaria-Munich and Bavaria-Straubing

=== Bavaria: Middle Ages and modern times ===
From the 6th century, most of the Innviertel, with its ducal courts at Ranshofen and Mattighofen, was part of the Mattiggau region of the German stem duchy of Bavaria, the northern part belonging to the Rottachgau. In 1507, Innbaiern became part of the Rentamt of Burghausen with its courts at Wildshut (merged with the Mattighofen District Court), Braunau, Mauerkirchen, Friedburg, Schärding and Ried. The Mondsee area in south Bavaria was lost to the Habsburgs as early as 1506. Administered from the town of Burghausen, the lands beyond the Inn river for centuries had two important roles: strategically as an eastern defence line against the rising Archduchy of Austria, and economically as arable land for crop farming.

During the Bavarian uprising of 1705–1706 against the occupation by the Habsburg Emperor Joseph I, Braunau was the seat of the short-lived Bavarian State Defence Congress (December 1705), or "Braunau Parliament", which called for a revolt against imperial Habsburg oppression. This was an early occurrence of a parliamentary system in the Holy Roman Empire.

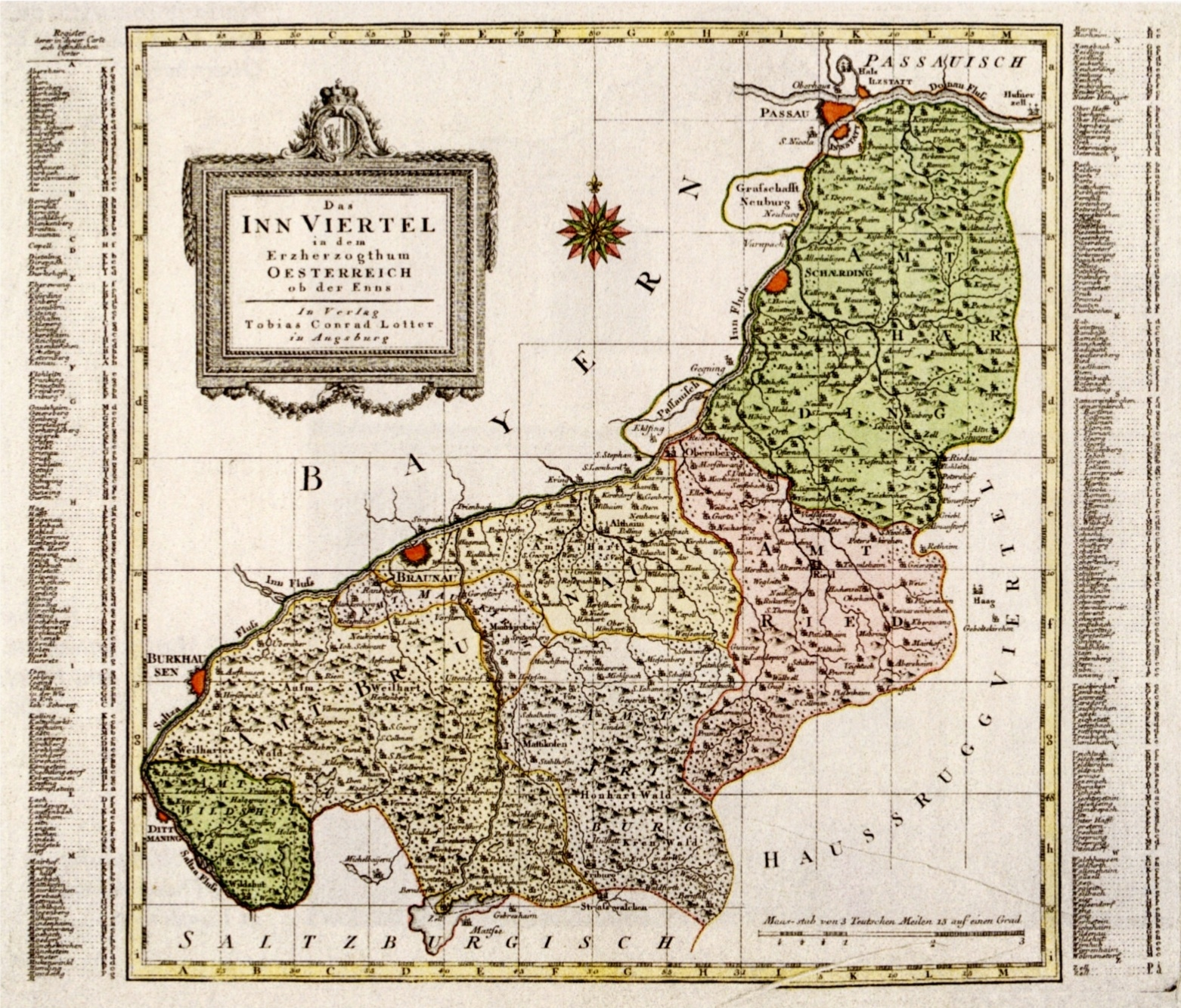
Map of the Innviertel in 1779

=== Habsburg era: Treaty of Teschen and Congress of Vienna ===
Only after the War of the Bavarian Succession was the area separated from the Electorate of Bavaria. The trigger for the war was the death of the childless Bavarian elector, Maximilian III Joseph (1745–1777). On his death the Bavarian line of the Wittelsbachs died out. A number of Central European powers laid claim to parts of the inheritance, including, first and foremost, Austria with its demands for the cession of Lower Bavaria and the Upper Palatinate. With the ratification of the Treaty of Teschen, which ended the War of the Bavarian Succession, the Innviertel became part of Upper Austria in 1779.

Thanks to the Treaty of Schönbrunn in 1809, Bavaria took possession of the Innviertel again in 1810. It was assigned to the Bavarian Lower Danube Circle together with parts of the Hausruckviertel. In 1811, the parishes in this area were separated from the Diocese of Linz and assigned to the Bishopric of Passau. Only under the Munich Treaty did the Kingdom of Bavaria finally cede the Innviertel and other areas to the Empire of Austria on 1 May 1816. On 1 July 1816, the Diocese of Linz also took over the corresponding areas again from the Bishopric of Passau.

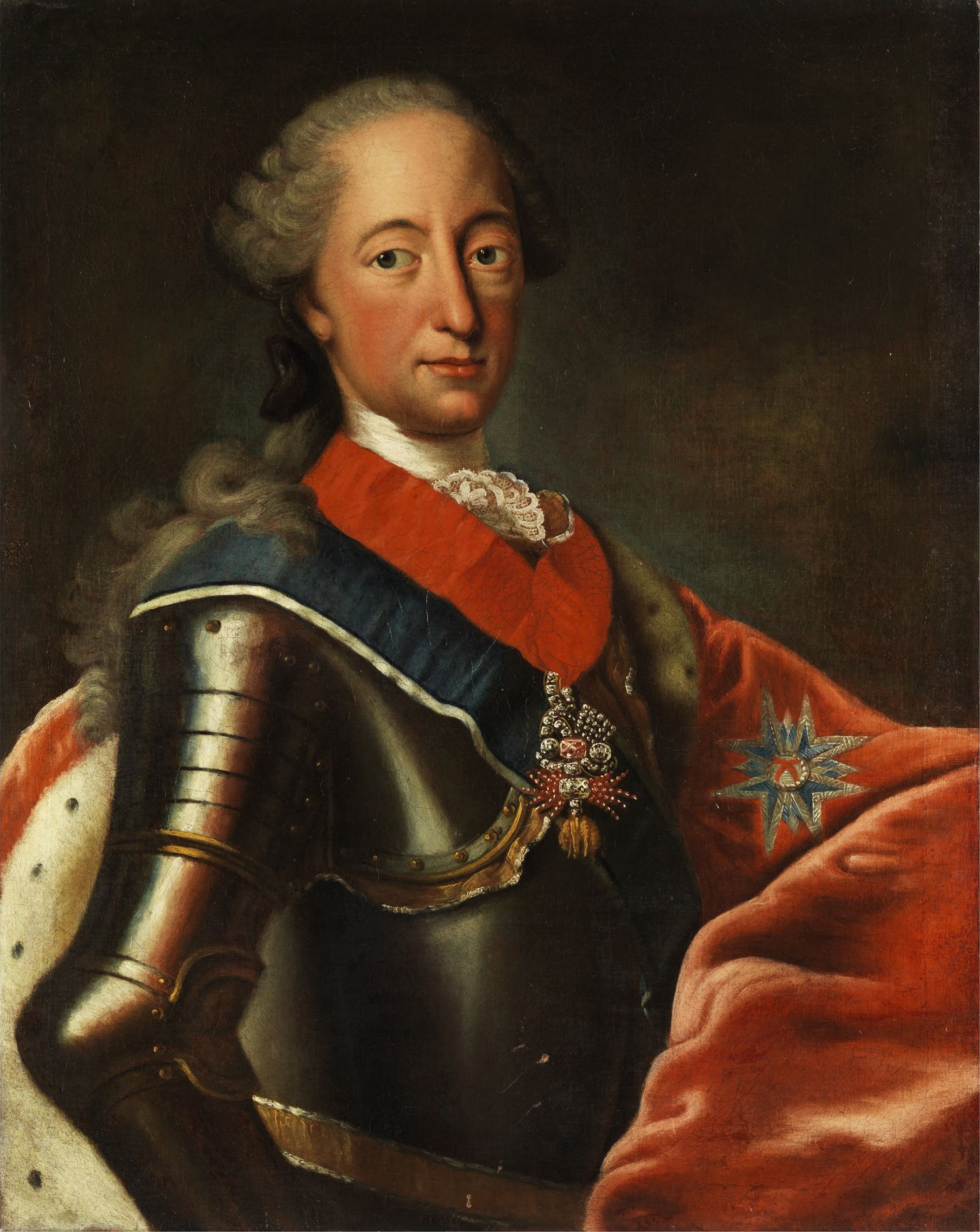
The death of Maximilian III Joseph is considered the trigger for the War of the Bavarian Succession.

=== Language and Bavarian heritage ===
At the political level, the incorporation of the new territory into the Land ob der Enns ("Land above the Ems", now Upper Austria) was carried through with a series of measures: oaths of allegiance were sworn by royal Bavarian officials and homage was paid by the Innviertel nobility to the new sovereign. More difficult was administrative integration, which was carried out by a separate "Regional Implementation Commission" (Landes-Einrichtungskommission) under the direction of Baron Franz Xaver Pockensteiner von Wolffenbach, since the Innviertel had not been an administrative unit until then, but had been administered from Burghausen which was still Bavarian. When the reforms by Emperor Joseph II were intensified by the introduction of new church and school rules in 1795, the population in the parish of St. Georgen gathered signatures at secret gatherings. The higher drinks taxes, which forced breweries to close, also aroused the resentment of the population. So the residents of Innbaiern were not very content with their new situation and the cry "Better to die Bavarian than suffer imperial ruin!" (Lieber bayrisch sterben als kaiserlich verderben!) was in circulation for a long time.

Linguistically, despite the extensive adoption of Austrian standard vocabulary, the dialect characteristics of West Central Bavarian were retained in the Innviertel; which mainly consist of a large number of vocalization features typical of the region (e.g. the word milk, in the Innviertel referred to as Milli or Muich, is mostly known as Müch in the rest of Austria), has survived to this day (compare Bavarian language). In the west the language changes gradually over into the West Central Bavarian dialects.

In the architecture of the towns, the colourfully decorated house facades of the Inn-Salzach Style are reminiscent of the Bavarian tradition.

=== Regional exhibitions ===
The first Bavarian-Upper Austrian regional exhibition took place in 2004 in Passau, Asbach, Reichersberg and Schärding.

== Relations with the rest of Upper Austria ==
The Innviertel was the centre of the violent Bavarian uprising against the Austrian occupation in 1705 and 1706. However, after its transfer to Austria in 1779, no broader resistance formed. For example, Franz Stelzhamer promoted mutual nationality in his prosaic work “Dá Soldatnvödá” and was considered an Upper Austrian "national poet" from the 19th century even though he came from the Innviertel.

Nonetheless, up to the 20th century there were disputes between groups from Innviertel and so-called "Landlers" ("Landl" is a term for the Hausruckviertel or for Upper Austria in general) at the level of the young farmers' clubs (Innviertler Zeche). From that time, locally-recognised sayings and declarations of war stem such as Wenn d’ Innviertler keman, hoasts umirucka! ("When the Innviertel folk come, it's time to go home!"). A certain local rivalry has emerged in the last few years, even in institutional circles such as in the tourist sector, from the Grieskirchen district to the Innviertel and, further east, to the state capital of Linz. It is primarily expressed in sporting competitions and political and public debates about the disadvantages of the Innviertel compared to the more central regions of Upper Austria, which at times dominate reporting in the local media.

Palatine Lion and Bavarian Fusils in the municipal arms of Braunau

One of those political points of contention for years has been the inadequately -developed road link to the nearby city of Salzburg to which the upper Innviertel (Braunau district and the southwestern parts of Ried district) is oriented. Nevertheless, the Vienna-Linz-Munich link is an important transport route. As the urban centre of the lower Innviertel (Schärding District, northeastern parts of Ried district), Passau plays a major role.

A perceived independence of the Innviertel is also reflected in the "capital city debate", which was kicked off by the Mayor of Ried, Albert Ortig, during the 2009 election campaign and in which he declared the town of Ried to be the capital of the Innviertel and thus provoked the politicians of Braunau.

Despite all of those circumstances, the inhabitants of the Innviertel identify far more with their region today than those in the remaining quarters of Upper Austria. They, with the exception of the Mühlviertel, which is bordered by the Danube, deviate to some extent geographically from the modern district boundaries.

== Demographics ==
Today the Innviertel has about 215,000 people in its towns, villages and hamlets. Its Bavarian roots show in the local German dialect, Innviertlerisch, a Western Central Austro-Bavarian variant similar to the languages spoken in adjacent Lower Bavaria.

== Notable people ==
Innviertel is the birthplace of Franz Xaver Gruber, composer of Silent Night, opera singer Franz Xaver Gerl, the Schwanthaler family of Baroque sculptors, SS general and war criminal Ernst Kaltenbrunner, beatified conscientious objector Franz Jägerstätter, and physicist Anton Zeilinger. Both Adolf Hitler and the diplomat Egon Ranshofen-Wertheimer were born in the town of Braunau am Inn on the German border.

== Gallery ==
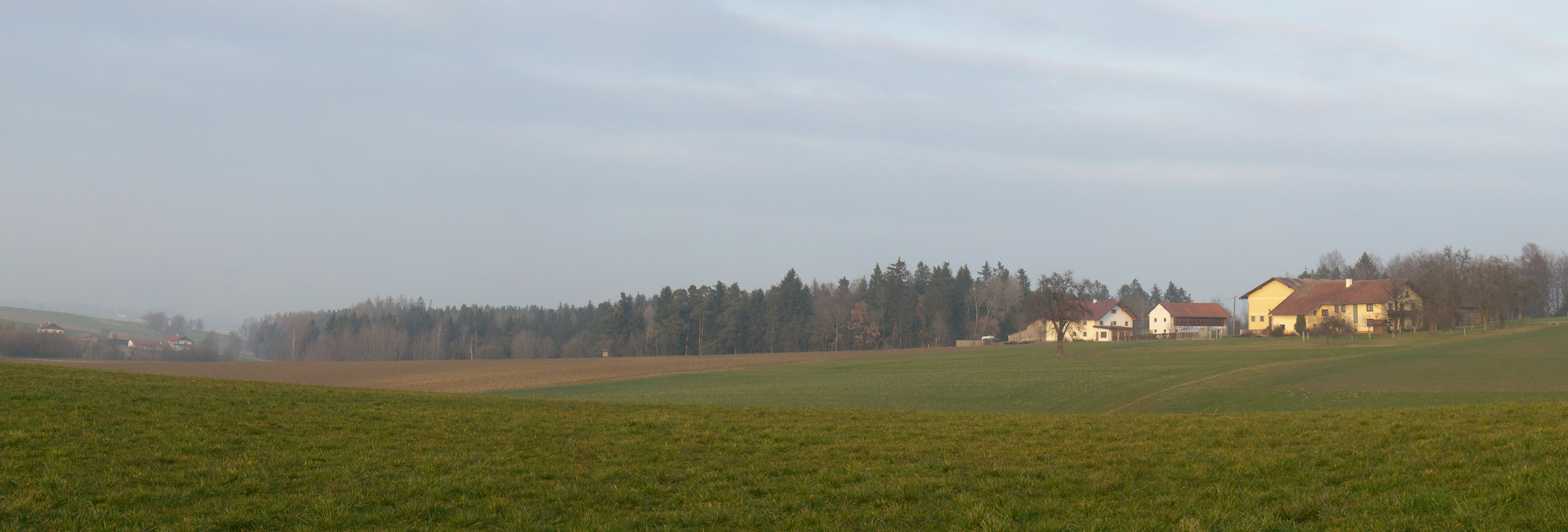
Innviertel countryside near Wollöster, Burgkirchen

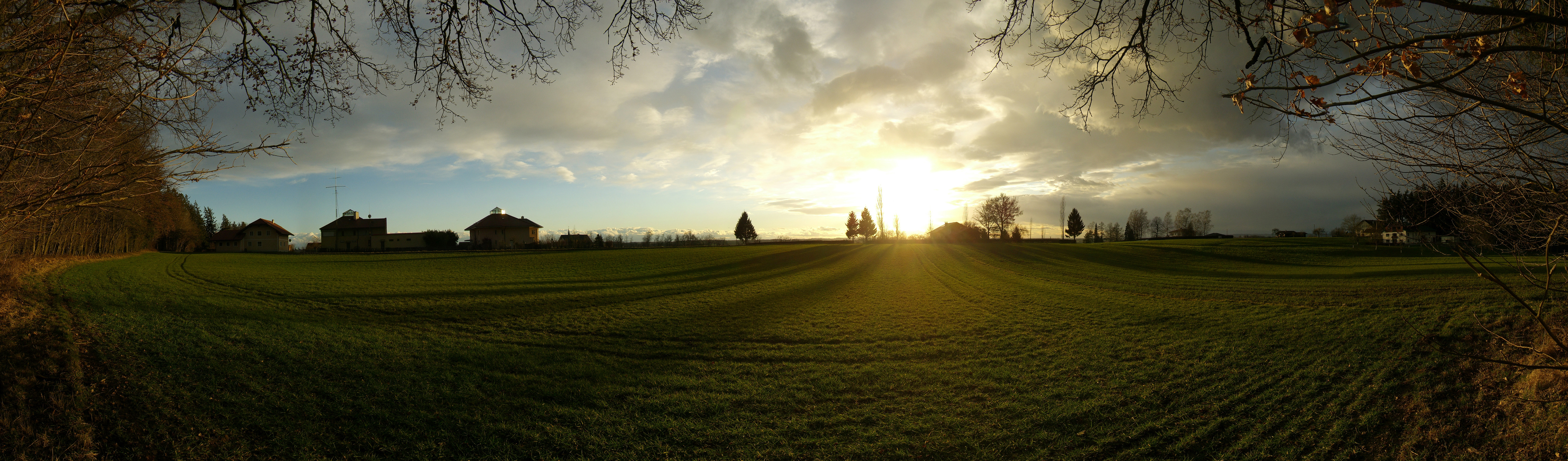
Sundown in the Innviertel near Wollöster

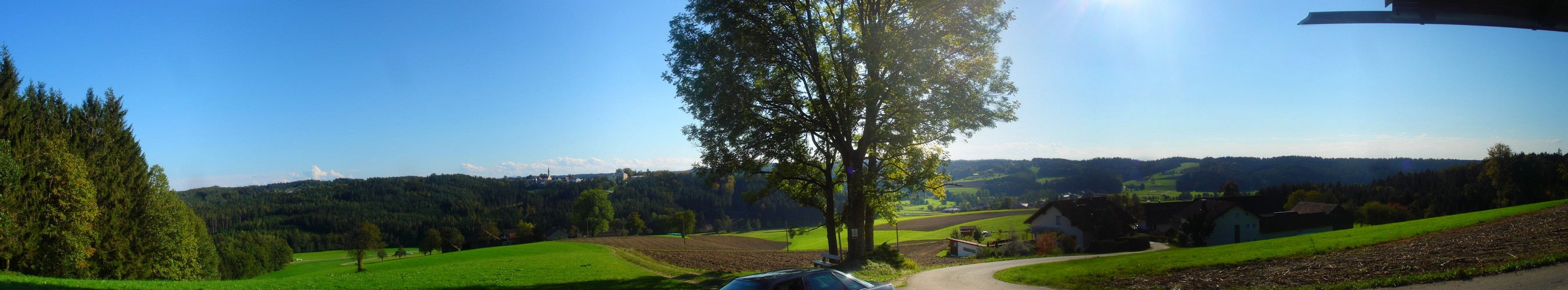
Maria Schmolln (view from Hunters' Chapel)

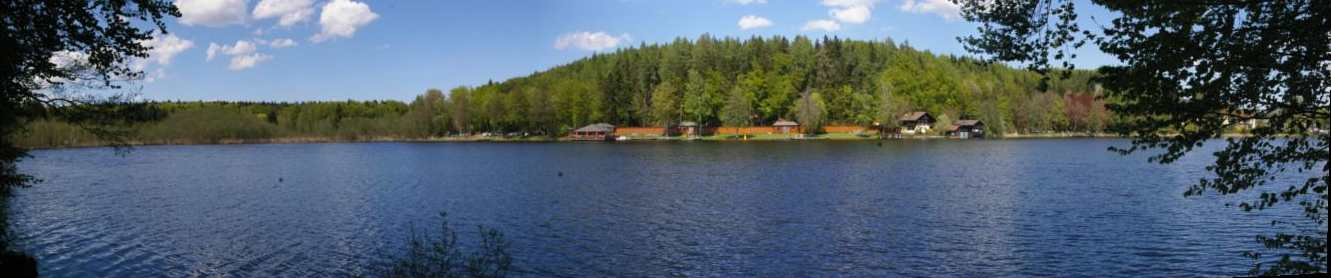
Upper Innviertel Lake District, Holzöstersee

== See also ==
- Upper Austria
  - Hausruckviertel
  - Mühlviertel
  - Traunviertel

== Literature ==
- Ludwig Maier, ed. (2005), G'wunna hat z'letzt nur unseroans! Der Bairische Volksaufstand 1705/1706 im Spanischen Erbfolgekrieg. Vom Innviertel nach Tölz, zur Sendlinger Mordweihnacht und zur Schlacht bei Aidenbach (in German), Munich, ISBN 3-902121-68-8
- Herbert Wurster: Heimat am Inn, Kultur und Geschichte, Simbach/Braunau/Inn 1999 (siehe auch www.hrb.at).
- Günther Kleinhanns, Anton Hauser (1991), Das Innviertel (in German), Vienna: Jugend und Volk, ISBN 3-224-17656-3
- Siegfried Haider (1987), Geschichte Oberösterreichs (in German), Munich: R. Oldenbourg, ISBN 3-486-54081-5
- Roger M. Allmannsberger, Gerhard Schwentner (2017), Das Landgericht Ried, Historischer Atlas von Bayern Teil I/2: Innviertel (in German), Munich: Bayerische Akademie der Wissenschaften, ISBN 978-3-7696-6561-1
- Gerhard Schwentner (2014), Kommission für bayerische Landesgeschichte (ed.), Das Landgericht Schärding, Historischer Atlas von Bayern Teil I/1: Innviertel (in German), Munich: Bayerische Akademie der Wissenschaften, ISBN 978-3-7696-6559-8
