= Disarm (disambiguation) =

"Disarm" is a song by the American alternative rock band The Smashing Pumpkins.

Disarm may also refer to:

- Disarm (film), a 2005 documentary film about landmines
- Disarm (band), a Swedish hardcore punk band
- The process of disarmament in which a force, or organization no longer is armed

== See also ==
- DISARM, an open source framework on disinformation tactics, techniques and procedures which has been supported by Alliance4Europe
- Disarmament
