= Treaty of Teschen =

1779 peace treaty ending the War of the Bavarian Succession

Friede von Teschen
- Signed: 13 May 1779
- Location: Teschen (Cieszyn)
- Effective: 28 February 1780
- Condition: Ratification by the Empire
- Signatories: Habsburg Monarchy Kingdom of Prussia
- Languages: French

The Treaty of Teschen (German: Frieden von Teschen, lit. 'Peace of Teschen'; French: Traité de Teschen) was signed on 13 May 1779 in Teschen, then in Austrian Silesia, between the Austrian Habsburg monarchy and the Kingdom of Prussia, which officially ended the War of the Bavarian Succession.

== Background ==
When the childless Wittelsbach elector Maximilian III Joseph of Bavaria died in 1777, the Habsburg emperor Joseph II sought to acquire most of the Electorate of Bavaria and the Upper Palatinate, basing his claim on his marriage with the late elector's sister, Maria Josepha, who had died in 1767.

Maximilian's direct heir was his distant cousin Count Palatine and Prince-Elector Charles Theodore (1724–1799), by prior succession agreements between the Bavarian and Palatinate branches of the Wittelsbach dynasty. Charles Theodore was amenable to an agreement with Emperor Joseph II that would allow him to acquire parts of the Austrian Netherlands in exchange for parts of his Bavarian inheritance. From 16 January 1778 Austrian troops moved into the Lower Bavarian lands of Straubing. Ultimately, both parties envisioned a wholesale exchange of the Bavarian lands for the Austrian Netherlands, but the final details were never concluded by treaty due to outside intervention.

Since Charles Theodore too had no legitimate heirs, his prospective successor was his Palatine cousin, Duke Charles II August of Zweibrücken (1746–1795), who objected to an agreement that would deprive him of the Bavarian inheritance. He appealed to the Imperial Diet in Regensburg. His cause was taken up by Prussian King Frederick the Great, who refused any increase in Austrian territory, and by Saxony, whose Wettin electoral house had married into the Wittelsbach family and therefore had allodial claims to parts of the inheritance.

The War of the Bavarian Succession broke out with the invasion of the Prussian Army into Bohemia on 5 July 1778 after Austria and Prussia could not negotiate a solution to their differences. Difficulties in supplying the troops turned the war into a stalemate: the Prussians were not able to advance far into the Bohemian lands, but the Austrians were unwilling to invade Saxony or Prussia. That was partly because Empress Maria Theresa (the mother of Joseph II and his co-ruler as Queen of Bohemia and Archduchess of Austria) firmly opposed the war after it became clear that a stalemate had prevailed.

She dispatched peace initiatives to King Frederick II of Prussia and forced her son to accept mediation by France and Russia. The peace came at the initiative of the Russian Empress Catherine the Great and was guaranteed by both Russia and France.

== Treaty ==
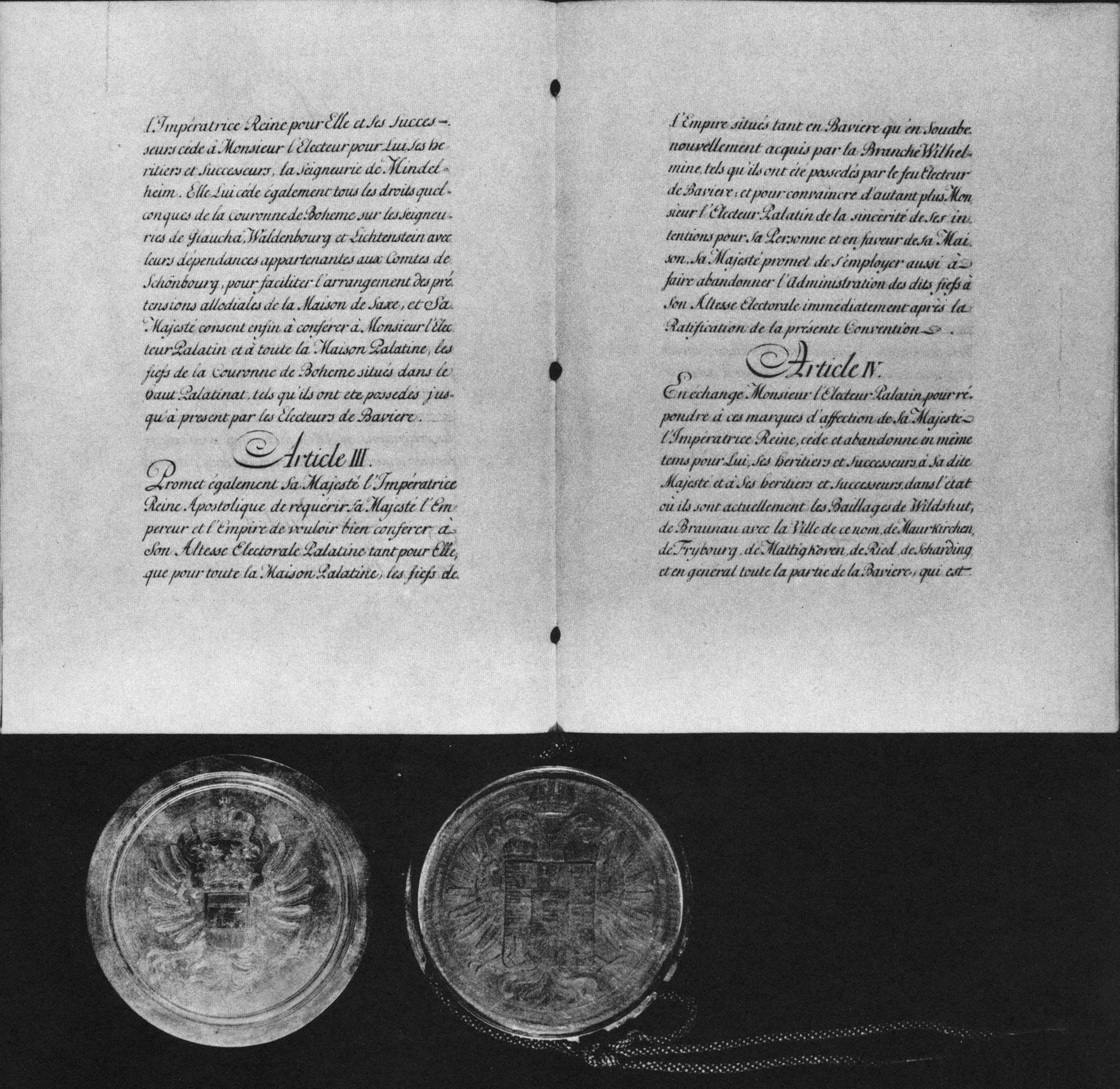
Austrian ratification document (articles II to IV) of the Treaty of Teschen

The accord dictated that the Habsburg Archduchy of Austria (Principality of Austria above the Enns) would receive the Bavarian lands east of the Inn river in compensation, a region then called "Innviertel", stretching from the Prince-Bishopric of Passau to the northern border of the Prince-Archbishopric of Salzburg. However, one of the requirements was that Austria would recognize the Prussian claims to the Franconian margraviates of Ansbach and Bayreuth, ruled in personal union by Margrave Christian Alexander from the House of Hohenzollern. Prussia finally purchased both margraviates in 1791. The Electorate of Saxony received a sum of six million guilders (florins) from Bavaria in exchange of its inheritance claims.

With the accession of Elector Charles Theodore, the electorates of Bavaria and the County Palatine of the Rhine (i.e. the territories in the Rhenish Palatinate and the Upper Palatinate) were under the united rule of the House of Wittelsbach. Their electoral votes were combined into one per a provision in the earlier Treaty of Westphalia in 1648, thereby reducing the number of electorates in the Holy Roman Empire to eight. The Innviertel, except for a short time during the Napoleonic Wars, has remained with Upper Austria up to today.

== Aftermath ==
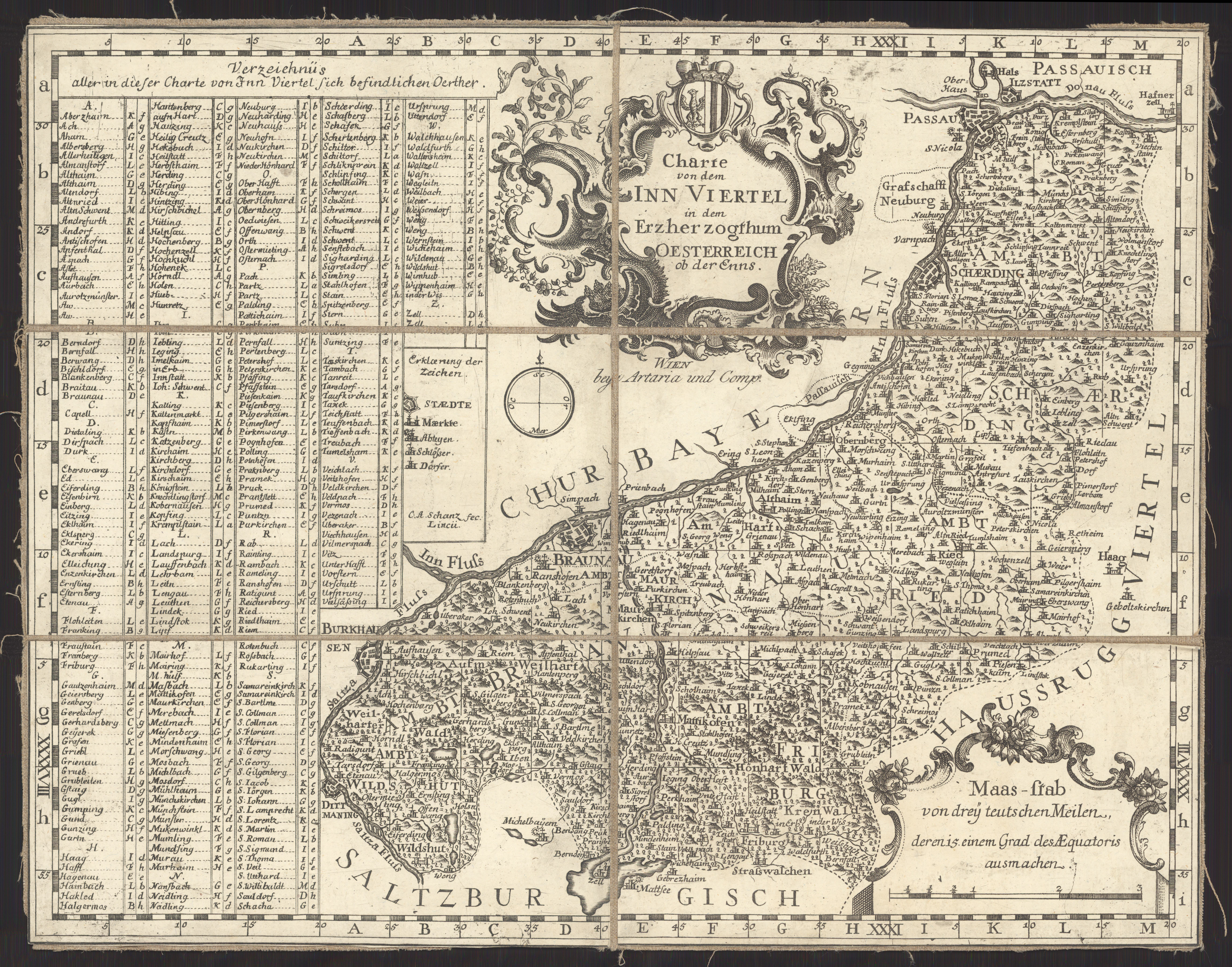
Composite map of the Inn district, 1790

In 1785, Maria Theresa's son and successor Emperor Joseph II of Austria made another try at attaching the Bavarian lands to his Habsburg possessions, and even contracted with Elector Charles Theodore to swap it for the Austrian Netherlands. However, Joseph II again did not agree to a full exchange of all provinces within the Austrian Netherlands, and the agreement collapsed amidst tacit French opposition and overt Prussian hostility, with King Frederick II of Prussia raising the opposition by the Fürstenbund, an association of several Imperial princes.

== See also ==
- German dualism
- List of treaties
