= Guarantor of the imperial constitution =

States defending the Holy Roman Empire's constitution

The guarantors of the imperial constitution or guarantor powers were those states that were, by treaty, obligated to defend the constitution of the Holy Roman Empire. Starting in 1648 the guarantor powers were Sweden and France, joined by Russia in 1779.

The role of the guarantors was first defined in the Peace of Westphalia (24 October 1648) that ended the Thirty Years' War, specifically in Article 17 of the Treaty of Osnabrück with Sweden and Article 16 of the Treaty of Münster with France. In 1779, Russia became the third guarantor power through Article 12 of the Treaty of Teschen (13 May) that ended the War of the Bavarian Succession.

== Powers ==
Although the use of external or third-party guarantors was not unusual in treaties at the time, the original Westphalian guarantors (Sweden and France) were parties to the treaties. Nonetheless, since most clauses in the treaties dealt with the inner workings of the Empire, it is common to regard Sweden and France as external guarantors. In fact, as parties to the treaties, the emperor and the imperial estates were also guarantors, although their status as such was generally ignored in theoretical discussions of the treaties and the guarantees.

According to the imperial jurist Johann Jakob Moser, the guarantee in the treaties of Westphalia could be used by anyone, "natives or foreigners, members of the Empire or not, whoever directly or indirectly is injured according to the Treaty of Westphalia." Karl von Aretin argues that although the guarantor power "seemed to open the door to intervention in the politics of the Empire ... it turned out that politics based on the guarantee of peace in the Treaty of Westphalia forced the guarantor powers as well to pursue a politics of peace and legality in the sense of the Imperial Constitution." The actual formal use of the guarantor power required following a complicated series of steps.

Patrick Milton argues that "by placing the confessional rights of religious groups under international guarantee, the Peace of Westphalia and its guarantee clauses helped to establish the principle of internationally guaranteed minority rights as a part of the positive law of nations."

== History ==
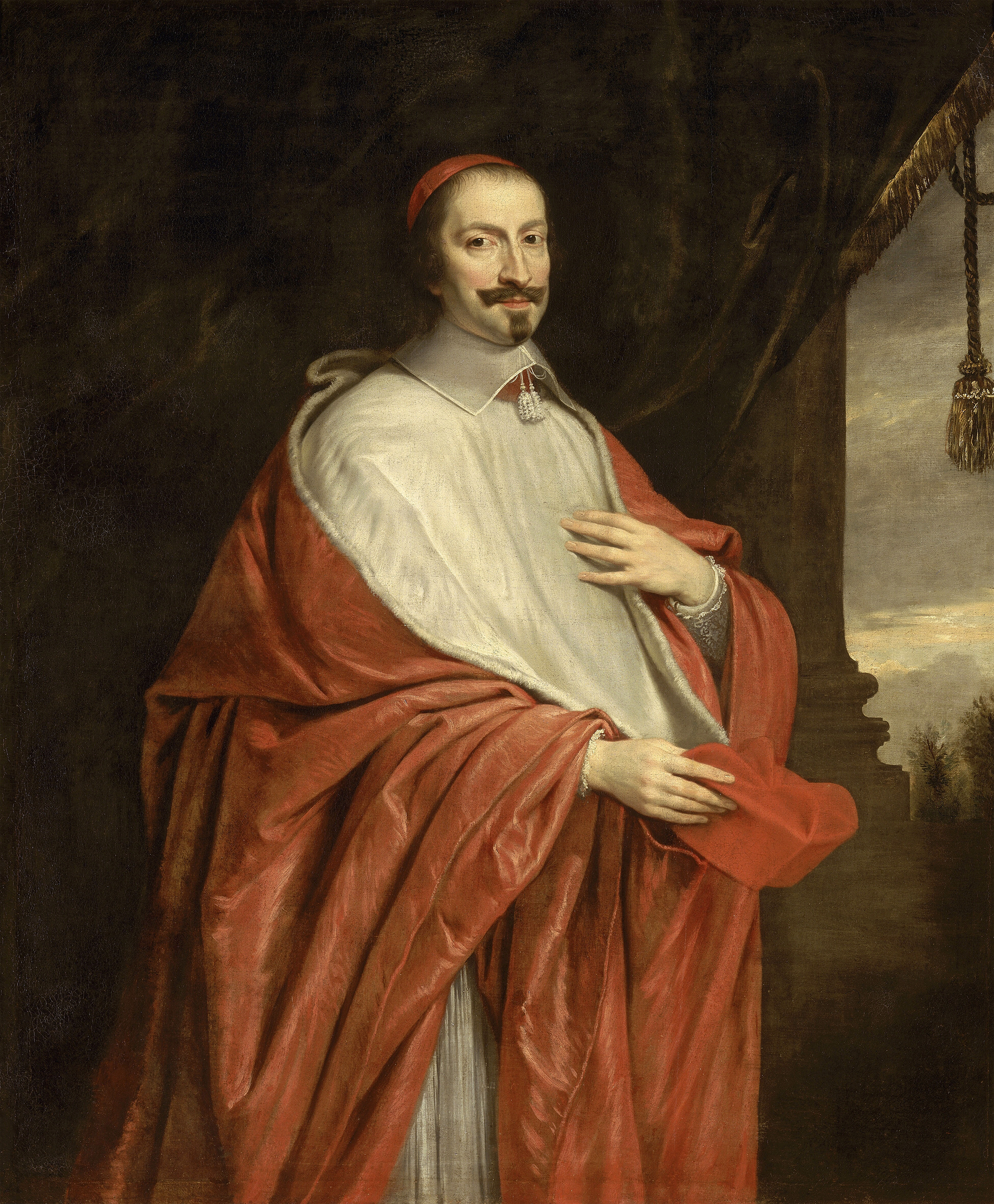
Cardinal Mazarin, French statesman

Cardinal Richelieu first conceived the idea of a French peace guarantee as a form of collective security during the War of the Mantuan Succession (1628–1631). It was envisioned as a substitute for the emperor's feudal suzerainty in imperial Italy, but France lost the war and had to accept the continuance of imperial suzerainty. In 1648, Richelieu's successor, Cardinal Mazarin, acquired a guarantor power expressly to uphold the Empire. The high point of the French exercise of the power came in 1658 when the League of the Rhine was formed as a counterweight to the imperial prerogative. After the death of Mazarin in 1661, King Louis XIV overplayed his hand, alienated the members of the League and allowed the Emperor Leopold I to regain some of his authority and prestige.

The decline of France's guarantor power began with its invasion of the Spanish Netherlands, legally a part of the Empire, in 1667. A turning point was the invasion of the Dutch Republic in 1672. Louis XIV declared that, since the Republic lay outside the Empire, any assistance given to such an enemy of France by the Empire or its members was a violation of the Peace of Westphalia and of the guarantee. Thereafter, France was no longer perceived as the protector of German liberties. The beginning of the Eternal Diet, the perpetual session of the imperial diet after 1663, hastened the decline of France's standing in the Empire, since the diet provided an internal mechanism for settling disputes.

In a dispute between the Electoral Palatinate and its neighbours led by the Electorate of Mainz—the so-called Wildfangstreit of 1660–1674—the former called upon Sweden and France to intervene on its behalf as guarantors.

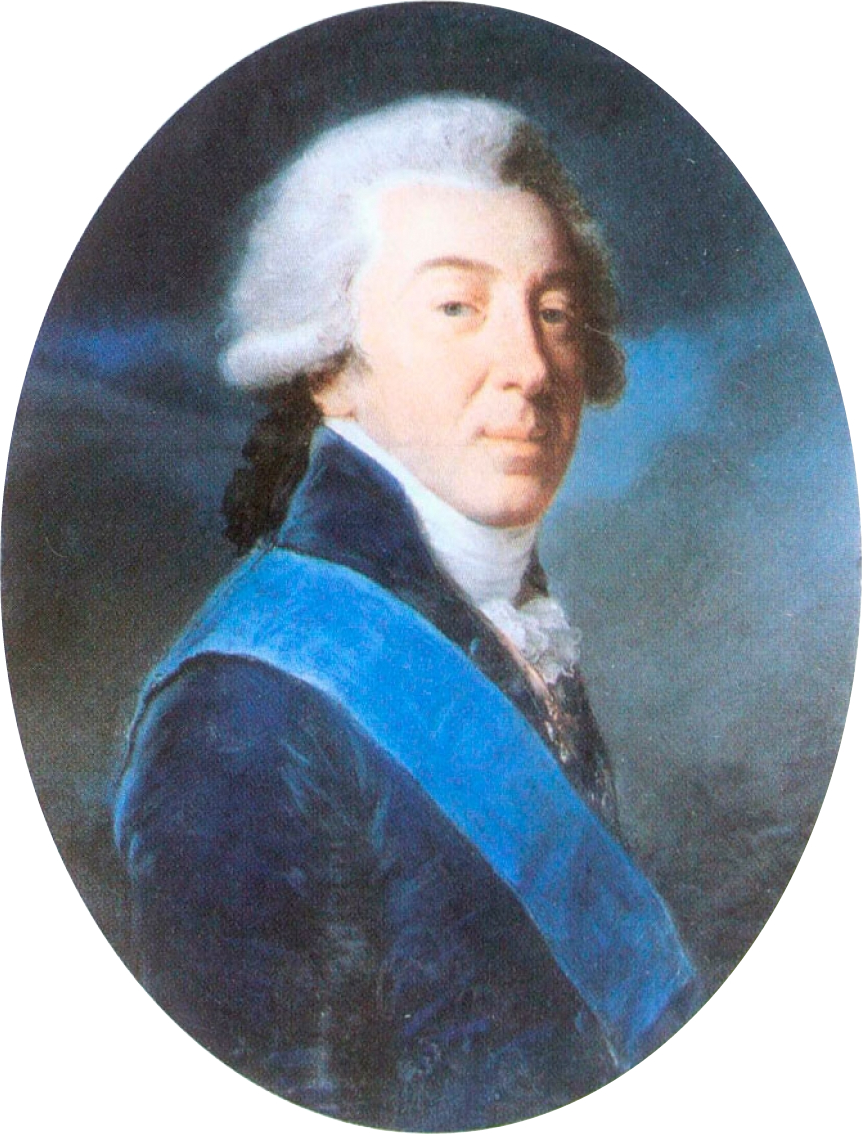
Nikolay Rumyantsev, Russian envoy

The Peace of Westphalia and the guarantor power were renewed in the subsequent treaties of Nijmegen (1679), Ryswick (1697), Rastatt (1714) and, to Russia's benefit, Teschen (1779). Russian interest in a role in the Empire began with Tsar Peter the Great as early as 1710. In January 1778, an opportunity presented itself to Catherine the Great when King Frederick II of Prussia requested her mediation in a dispute over Bavaria. In a letter of 3 February, Frederick claimed that Russia would certainly become a guarantor of the Empire if Catherine intervened to help him. Russia's aim was to become a guarantor with rights in the Empire and not to help Prussia. To this end, Catherine moderated Prussian aims, resulting a treaty unexpectedly favourable to Austria. By 1781, a diplomatic revolution had taken place. Gone was the Russo-Prussian alliance, replaced by a new Austro-Russian alliance. The guarantor system of Westphalia had also been transformed. Russia, which had defeated Sweden in the Great Northern War (1721), effectively usurped its place as guarantor. The first Russian envoy to the empire in its capacity as a guarantor was Nikolay Rumyantsev, who arrived in 1782.

Russia's last major intervention as a guarantor was in favour of the princes' league in the autumn of 1794. Catherine wrote a letter praising the league as an act of imperial patriotism. The league never came to fruition. After Catherine's death in 1796, the Russian court took little interest in exercising its guarantor powers, although Tsar Paul I claimed a right to be consulted on all imperial questions.

During the French Revolutionary Wars, the treaties of Campo Formio (1797) and Lunéville (1801) renewed Westphalia and the guarantor clause. France and Russia played a role in the Reichsdeputationshauptschluss. On 5 March 1804, French troops entered imperial territory to arrest Louis Antoine, Duke of Enghien, who was tried and executed on 21 March. Sweden and Russia, as guarantors, demanded that the Emperor Francis II respond to the blatant violation of imperial sovereignty, but the emperor refused. Napoleon Bonaparte, emperor of France since 1804, dispensed with the renewal of the guarantor clause in the treaties of Schönbrunn (1805) and Pressburg (1805). Thereafter he acted as arbiter of the Empire's fate rather than guarantor of its constitution until its final dissolution in August 1806.
