= Petrovice (Ústí nad Labem District) =

- Municipality
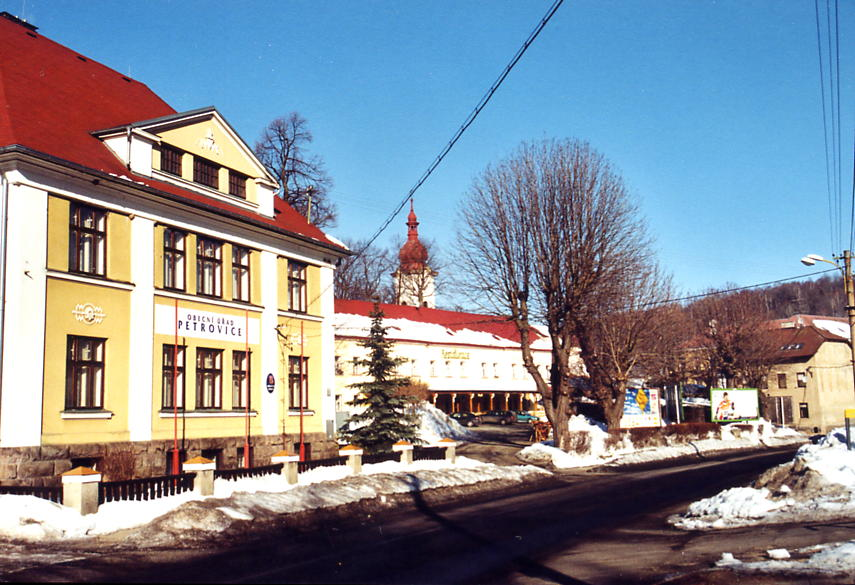
- Centre with the municipal office

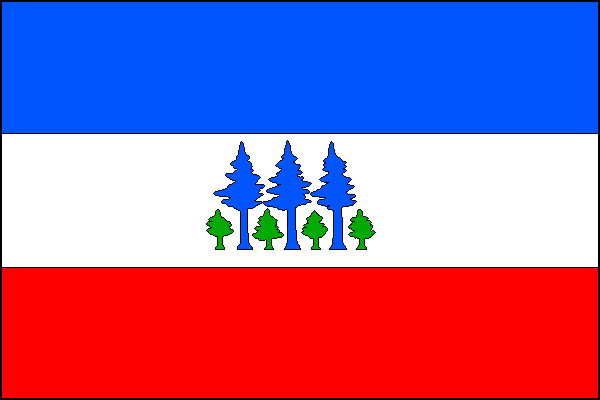
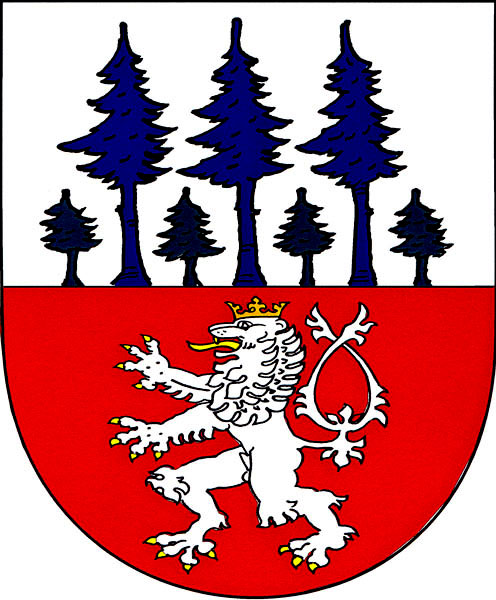
- Flag Coat of arms

- Location in the Czech Republic
- Coordinates: 50°47′21″N 13°58′35″E
- Country: Czech Republic
- Region: Ústí nad Labem
- District: Ústí nad Labem
- First mentioned: 1352

Area
  - Total: 51.17 km^{2} (19.76 sq mi)
- Elevation: 530 m (1,740 ft)

Population (2026-01-01)
  - Total: 914
  - Density: 17.9/km^{2} (46.3/sq mi)
- Time zone: UTC+1 (CET)
  - Summer (DST): UTC+2 (CEST)
- Postal code: 403 37
- Website: www.obecpetrovice.cz

Petrovice (German: Peterswald) is a municipality and village in Ústí nad Labem District in the Ústí nad Labem Region of the Czech Republic. It has about 900 inhabitants.

Petrovice lies approximately 15 kilometres (9 mi) north of Ústí nad Labem and 84 km (52 mi) north of Prague.

== Administrative division ==
Petrovice consists of two municipal parts (in brackets population according to the 2021 census):

- Petrovice (732)
- Krásný Les (147)

== History ==
On 15 April 1759, the Battle of Peterswalde of the Seven Years' War took place here.

== Demographics ==
Historical population
Year	Pop.	±%
1869	5,572	—
1880	5,549	−0.4%
1890	5,133	−7.5%
1900	4,857	−5.4%
1910	5,226	+7.6%
1921	4,633	−11.3%
1930	4,439	−4.2%
1950	834	−81.2%
1961	754	−9.6%
1970	773	+2.5%
1980	698	−9.7%
1991	596	−14.6%
2001	622	+4.4%
2011	832	+33.8%
2021	879	+5.6%
Source: Censuses
