= Alliance4Europe =

European non-profit organisation

- Formation: 26 October 2018
- Founder: Many
- Founded at: Munich, Germany
- Type: Civil society organisation
- Legal status: Active
- Purpose: Pro-Europeanism, Democracy
- Region served: Europe
- Methods: Campaigning, organising
- Fields: Civil society movement
- Website: https://alliance4europe.eu/

Alliance4Europe is a non-profit civil society organisation that strives to strengthen European democracy by fostering cooperation among actors across society. The organisation was founded in 2018 by a group of civil society organisations, and citizens across Europe. Its foundation was initially predicated as a response to growing concerns about populism and extremism across Europe. Alliance4Europe have since created and carried out a number of campaigns directed towards being an "engine for European democracy", and fighting disinformation. Through their campaigning, Alliance4Europe have reached over 74 million people across Europe – and are supported by over 1000 partners.

== Approach ==
Alliance4Europe model their action on an approach that is based on community collaboration, digital intelligence analysis and campaign creation. Through this approach, they have been able to connect and support like-minded Pro-European civil society organisations, and develop "a successful playbook for democracy". Because of this, the organisation has managed to work alongside partners such as the Project for Democratic Union in pursuit of the protection of democracy in Europe and the wider region; the civic action network being a prominent example.

== Notable projects ==
=== Partnership Hub ===
The "Partnership Hub" is an initiative aiming to create civil society cooperation to empower Ukrainian refugees in the Poland-Ukraine border region. The project aimed to enable - providing psychological support, professional activation, social integration, and campaigning against disinformation and xenophobia. Through its approach, it has thus far had a positive impact on over 17,000 refugees.

=== DISARM ===
DISARM is an open source framework on disinformation tactics, techniques and procedures which has been supported by Alliance4Europe. DISARM applies established cybersecurity practices and infrastructure to information threats. The framework has been recommended for use by NATO, and used by the EU External Action Service, the EU Cybersecurity Agency and is in the EU code of practice on disinformation. In 2023, DISARM was adopted by the EU and US government as part of a formal data sharing system on foreign information manipulation and interference. the DISARM framework is overseen, developed and maintained by the DISARM foundation.

=== European Hub ===
The European Hub for civic engagement is a project that focuses on creating an online space for collaboration and content sharing between civic organisations. The platform supports organisations by enabling them to share relevant information, build community and access funding. The project aims to promote European integration and increase citizen influence on EU institutions.

=== Democrisis ===
Alliance4Europe was instrumental in the launch of DemoCrisis, a civil action network for collaboration among pro-democracy campaign movements across Europe and the wider region. It was initiated by movements from Israel, Hungary and Poland, and expanding further afield. The project intends to cross borders and share best practices to protect liberal democracy.
