= Battle of Zuckmantel =

1779 battle of the War of the Bavarian Succession

- Part of the War of the Bavarian Succession
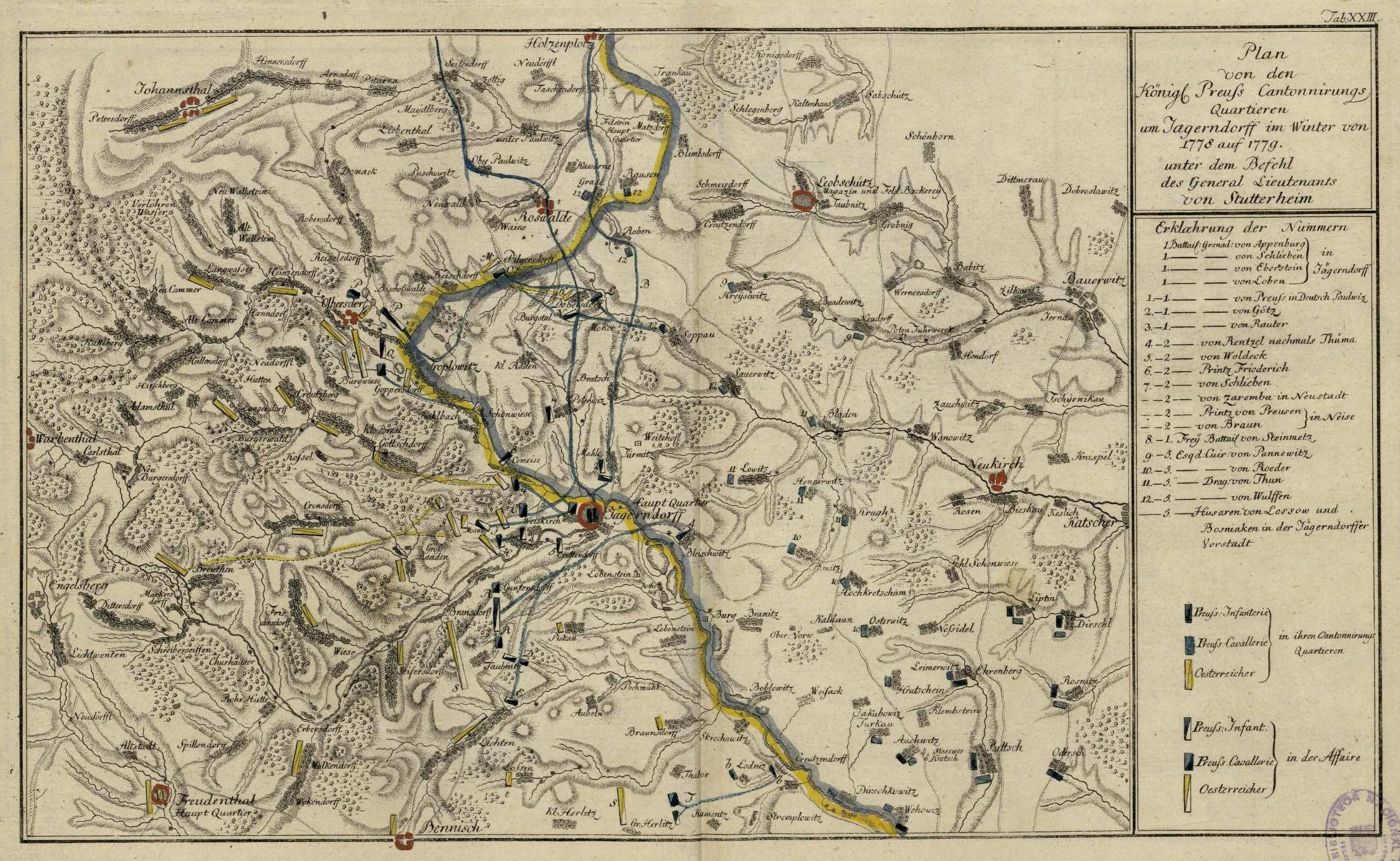
- Plan of positions of the Prussian army near Jagendorf (Krnov) under general von Sttuterheim in Winter 1778/1779
Date	14 January 1779
Location	Zuckmantel, Austrian Silesia (today Zlaté Hory, Czech Republic)
Result	Austrian victory

Belligerents
Habsburg monarchy	Prussia

Commanders and leaders
Franz Levenehr	Johann Jakob von Wunsch

Strength
3,200	10,000

Casualties and losses
20	800

The Battle of Zuckmantel (historian G. Bodart referred to it as the Gefecht bei Zuckmantel, 'Combat of Zuckmantel') was a clash during the War of the Bavarian Succession on 14 January 1779 between Habsburg (under the command of Colonel Franz Levenehr) and Prussian (under Major General Johann Jakob von Wunsch) forces, in which the former emerged victorious and inflicted much higher casualties, despite their significant numerical inferiority; however, this clash did not develop into the intensity of a pitched battle, while representing only but limited enemy contact. It was one of the few battles of this Austro-Prussian war of 1778–1779.

In the following raid and encounter, which took place four days later, 18 January, at Habelschwerdt (today Bystrzyca Kłodzka), 11,000 Austrians under the later infamous Dagobert Sigmund von Wurmser, suffering 300 dead or wounded, overwhelmed another Prussian force of 3,000 under Landgrave of Hesse-Philippsthal-Barchfeld, inflicting 400 dead or wounded and 1,100 captured. Thus, the military reforms of the Austrian Empress Maria Theresa, caused by the Silesian Wars defeats, bore fruit, thanks to which Austria retained its position as a "great power" on the European continent.

== Sources ==
- Bodart, Gaston (1908). Militär-historisches Kriegs-Lexikon (1618–1905) (in German). C. W. Stern.
- ADB:Wurmser, Dagobert Sigmund Graf von (in German). Vol. 44. 1898. pp. 338–340 – via Wikisource.
- Almanach de la Cour Imperiale et Royale: pour l'année Österreich. Trattner. 1790. p. 105.
- Clark, Christopher (2006). Iron Kingdom: The Rise and Downfall of Prussia, 1600–1947. Cambridge, Massachusetts: Belknap Press. ISBN 978-0-674-02385-7.
