= Johann Jakob von Wunsch =

Prussian general

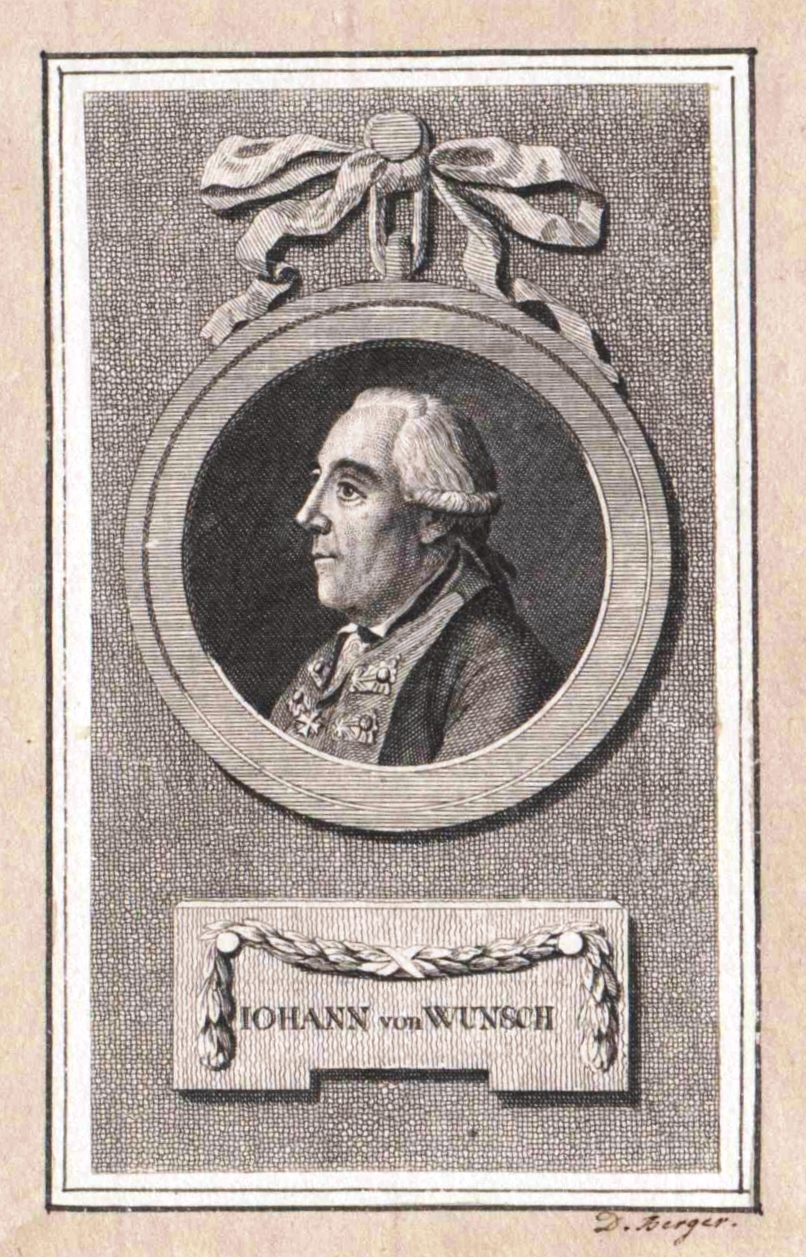
- Engraving of Wunsch
- Born: 22 December 1717; Heidenheim, Württemberg
- Died: 18 October 1788 (aged 70) Prenzlau, Kingdom of Prussia
- Allegiance: Kingdom of Prussia
- Branch: Prussian Army
- Service years: 1735–1788
- Rank: General of Infantry
- Conflicts: Ottoman–Habsburg wars War of the Austrian Succession; Seven Years' War; War of the Bavarian Succession
- Awards: Pour le Mérite; Order of the Black Eagle; Name inscribed on Frederick the Great's Equestrian Statue

Johann Jakob von Wunsch (1717–1788) was German soldier of fortune and Prussian general of infantry, and a particularly adept commander of light infantry. The son of a Württemberg furrier, he served in several armies in the course of his lengthy career.

Shortly after he turned 18, his father enrolled him in Württemberg service. In the Württemberg Regiment, he supported the Austrians against the Ottoman Empire in 1737. Later, he served in Bavarian army during the War of the Austrian Succession. In 1748 he came to the notice of Prince Henry, and enter Prussian service for the Seven Years' War, where he led an autonomous corps in many raids and skirmishes that wrought havoc on the Austrian forces. His incursion over Prussia's border with Bohemia in 1778 was the opening action of the War of the Bavarian Succession.

In peace time, he devoted his efforts to training light infantry, developing an autonomous corps of skirmishers. Frederick the Great's successor, Frederick Wilhelm II, promoted him to general of infantry and raised him to the Prussian nobility.

== Family and early military career ==
Wunsch was born on 22 December 1717 in Heidenheim, Württemberg to a furrier and died at Prenzlau, in the Kingdom of Prussia on 18 October 1788. His grandfather, Johann Georg Wünsch, served in the Austrian military, and his father had served for a few years in the Bavarian military. He received schooling locally, and on his eighteenth year, his father sent him to Officer Cadet training in the Duke of Württemberg's Regiment. While with this regiment in Vienna, he married Josephine le Roi, the daughter of a Habsburg War Commissary. They had one son.

== Early military career ==
The Duke of Württemberg's regiment supported the Austrian military in its wars with the Ottoman Empire. Between 1737 and 1739, Wunsch participated in several battles in the vicinity of Banja Luka, in modern-day Bosnia and Herzegovina. By 1739, he realized he had prospects in neither Austrian nor Württemberg service and he entered Bavarian service as the oldest second lieutenant in the Hussar Regiment Frangipani.

Upon the death of Charles VII, Holy Roman Emperor, the new Duke of Bavaria, Maximilian III Joseph, agreed to forgo any imperial aspirations. Wunsch's Bavarian regiment went into the service in the Netherlands, where it eventually liberated Brussels from the French in 1745. In the course of this service, Wunsch advanced to the rank of Rittmeister, or captain of cavalry. At the conclusion of the war in 1749, Rittmeister Wunsch acquired a staff position and a pension and remained in the Netherlands with his wife and son. When it became apparent that there would be another war, in 1756 he offered his services to Frederick the Great and became the oldest captain in Prussian service. His unit came under the command of Prince Henry of Prussia, an officer who understood the value of the new military formation of light troops for skirmishing and raids.

=== Seven Years' War ===
Throughout the Seven Years' War, Wunsch operated successfully as a light troops officer. After the Battle of Prague in 1757, he was promoted to major. He followed this up with stellar action near Torgau in September, and the following day his troops overran Leipzig. The subsequent Prussian successes at the battles of Breslau and Leuthen led to his promotion, this time by Frederick himself, to lieutenant colonel. The King also gave him command of an independent battalion. Wunsch made a brief journey to his home town of Heidenheim and returned to his unit in Bohemia. Wunsch's raids were so successful that, in July 1759, Frederick promoted him to the rank of colonel and gave him his own regiment of light troops to command. Only one month later, on 10 August, Wunsch was promoted to Major General. Two days later, at the Battle of Kunersdorf, the Prussian army was nearly destroyed. Wunsch's only child, a son, was killed in the battle. Frederick barely escaped with his life, assisted by his remaining cavalry. Wunsch's small force remained intact and provided the rear guard for Frederick's escape. In Berlin, Wunsch commanded the city's defenses.

From April to November 1759, he led his regiment on a series of raids and skirmishes in Silesia, Bohemia, Franconia, and Thuringia, such as the Battle of Peterswalde (Silesia) in August 1759. Wunsch took the pass of Reizenhain from the Austrians, skirmished with them at Königswarte and attacked and beat a small force of Austrians at Weinberg. He acquired two cannons in the engagement. He successfully raided various towns and cities held by Austria and her allies in Franconia, Saxony, and Bohemia, capturing supplies and cannons and frequently taking many prisoners. His son was a lieutenant in his regiment during these raids.

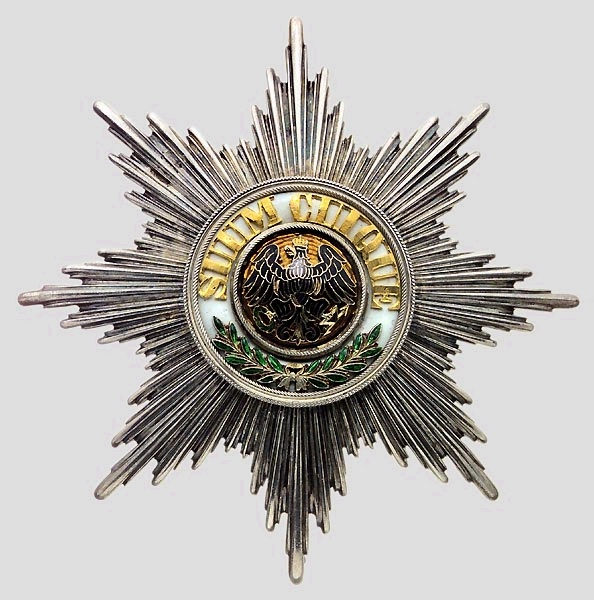
The star of the Order of the Black Eagle bears the Latin inscription SUUM CUIQUE, to each according to his merits. Frederick Wilhelm II of Prussia, King of Prussia, awarded this honor to Wunsch in 1787.

Following this action, Frederick sent Wunsch into Saxony with a corps of 10,000–12,000 men in his first independent command. There he participated in the Battle of Hoyerswerda with General Frederick August Finck. Prince Henry, in overall command of the army, surprised von Daun at Hoyerswerda by punching a hole in the Austrian defensive line. This success gave Frederick the first good news he had in weeks and confirmed to Frederick that Wunsch had been worthy of the trust placed in him.

After two months of skirmishing in Bohemia, on 2 November Wunsch was awarded the order Pour le Mérite. Later in the month he participated in the Battle of Maxen. There, Count Leopold Joseph von Daun's army isolated and captured Finck. Subsequently, Wunsch led both his corps and Finck's until they too were surrounded: Daun's army was three times the size of Finck's and Wunsch's combined force. Wunsch capitulated on 21 November 1759 and spent the remainder of the war as a prisoner in Innsbruck.

After the war, Frederick reorganized his army, placing nine of his generals under command of General Hans Joachim von Zieten. An additional eight were placed under command of Finck. Wunsch remained the only general with an independent corps, further unusual in that he was not Prussian.

== Late military career ==
Wunsch used the ensuing years of peace in garrison at Prenzlau to reorganize the light corps of Frederick's army. In 1778, he patrolled the border of Austrian Bohemia during the tense negotiations surrounding Bavarian Succession crisis. His entry into Bohemia in early July of that year was the first action of the War of the Bavarian Succession. He lost the insignificant battle of Zuckmantel, but there were no major engagements in the war, only a series of raids in which both sides tried to deny each other access to food and fodder. After his initial foray at the Silesia border, he and his command remained at the County of Glatz, guarding the military commissary and the bakery.

In 1787, Frederick Wilhelm II, Frederick the Great's successor, named Wunsch a Knight of the Order of the Black Eagle for his excellent service. After a lengthy illness, Wunsch died of a pneumonia in Prenzlau on 18 October 1788.

== Monument ==
Prince Henry established a monument for him in 1790, in Rheinsberg. Its inscription reads: Johann Jakob von Wunsch, the son of Heidenheim, the splendid monument which the Prussian people have established on behalf of their King, Frederick The Great.

== Sources ==
=== Bibliography ===
- (in German) Ebert, Jens-Florian. "Nauendorf, Friedrich August Graf." Die Österreichischen Generäle 1792–1815." Napoleononline (de): Portal zu Epoch. Jens Florian Ebert, editor. Oktober 2003. Accessed 15 October 2009.
- Hochedlinger, Michael. Austria's Wars of Emergence, 1683–1799. London: Longman, 2003.
- (in German) König, Anton Balthasar. Digital copy of Wunsch. Biographisches Lexikon aller Helden und Militärpersonen, Berlin 1791, Teil 4, Seite 283–291.
- (in German) Albert von Pfister. „Wunsch, Johann Jakob“. In: Allgemeine Deutsche Biographie, herausgegeben von der Historischen Kommission bei der Bayerischen Akademie der Wissenschaften, Band 44 (1898), S. 315–317, Digitale Volltext-Ausgabe in Wikisource. (Version vom 3. Mai 2010, 14:45 Uhr UTC)
- (in German) Albert Pfister. Drei Schwaben in fremden Kriegsdiensten. Graf Harsch. Herwarth von Bittenfeld. Joh. Jak. Wunsch. In: Württembergische Neujahrsblätter 12 (1895), S. 33–50.
- (in German) Wurzbach, Constant von . "Nauendorf, Friedrich August Graf." Biographisches Lexikon des Kaiserthums Österreich, enthaltend die Lebensskizzen der denkwürdigen Personen, welche seit 1750 in den österreichischen Kronländern geboren wurden oder darin gelebt und gewirkt haben. Wien: K.K. Hof- und Staatsdruckerie [etc.] 1856–91, Volume 20.
- Rickard, J. Battle of Maxen, 20 November 1759. History of war.org. Peter D Antill, Tristan Dugdale-Pointon, J Rickard, Editors in chief. 5 November 2000.
- (in German) Zedlitz-Neukirch, Leopold. Neues preussisches Adels-Lexicon. Leipzig: Reichenbach, 1857, Band 4.

Military offices
Preceded by Count Karl-Wilhelm Finck von Finckenstein	Proprietor (Inhaber) of Infantry Regiment N°12; 1765–1788	Succeeded by Franz Kasimir von Kleist
