= Battle of Peterswalde =

1759 battle

Coordinates: 50°47′13″N 13°58′43″E

Prussian Bohemia Incursion
- Part of the Third Silesian War (Seven Years' War)
Date	14 April – 20 April 1759 (6 days)
Location	Peterswald, Bohemia, Holy Roman Empire
Result	Prussian victory: Austrian munition magazines and 200+ ships destroyed; Austrian military Summer campaign delayed

Belligerents
Prussia	(Habsburg monarchy) Holy Roman Empire

Commanders and leaders
Prince Henry of Prussia; Johann Dietrich von Hülsen; Johann Jakob von Wunsch	Feldmarshall Lieutenant Ernst Gideon von Laudon; General Reinhardt (POW); Johann Friedrich Karl von Ostein

Units involved
Prince Henry's vanguard	I./Andlau Infanterie-Regiment; I.Battalion Königsegg Infanterie; Croatian soldiers Hungarian foot

Strength
Unknown	3,400+ men

Casualties and losses
Unknown	~3,000 captured 3 guns

The Prussian Bohemia Incursion was a military campaign led by the Prince Henry of Prussia during the Third Silesian War (part of the Seven Years' War), to disrupt the Austrian military capacity by launching incursions against its military infrastructure in Bohemia.

== The incursion ==
On 14 April Prince Henry of Prussia crossed the Ore Mountains in two columns:

- Prince Henri's column: 13 bns, 20 sqns
- General Hülsen's column: 8 bns and 12 sqns

On 15 April Prince Henry's column entered into Bohemia at Peterswalde, now part of the Czech Republic, while Hülsen marched to Passberg. Peterswalde was the site of a Habsburg ammunition magazine. A column of Prince Henry of Prussia's advance guard, under command of Johann Jakob von Wunsch, attacked a position strongly held by Croatians of the Habsburg military. In the skirmish, the Croats were routed out of their positions. Wunsch ordered all the munitions destroyed; he also destroyed several ships that were stationed on the Elbe river. Wunsch's force stayed in the village overnight; the next day they were attacked by the imperial force of the Archbishop of Mainz; in the subsequent skirmish, Wunsch's Prussians took one officer and 22 men prisoner. About 600 Grenzers and some Hungarian foot guarded a redoubt on an eminence beyond Peterswalde. Prince Henri's vanguard divided into two bodies, one proceeded to Aussig (present-day Ústí nad Labem), the other to Töpplitz (present-day Teplice); forcing the defenders to abandon their position. The magazine of Aussig was destroyed and about 200 boats on the Elbe burnt. Meanwhile, Hülsen found the pass of Passberg strongly guarded by General Reinhard (I./Andlau Infantry, 1 battalion of Königsegg Infantry, about 1,000 grenzers and hussars for a total of about 2,800 men). Hülsen led his cavalry around the Austrian positions and attacked them on the rear while his infantry launched a frontal attack. He drove the Austrians from their entrenchments, capturing the general, 51 officers and 2,000 men along with 3 colours, 2 standards and 3 guns. The remnants of Reinhard's force retreated to Trautenau (present-day Trutnov) where they joined Loudon.

On 16 April Prince Henri's vanguard returned to his column at Welmina (probably present-day Velemín). The magazines at Lobositz (present-day Lovosice), and Leitmeritz (present-day Litoměřice) were seized and the new bridge at Leitmeritz burnt. Prince Henri then marched from Leitmeritz to Budin (present-day Budyně nad Ohří) where he destroyed another magazine. The flames accidentally set the town on fire and did some damage. Meanwhile, General Hülsen marched on Saatz (present-day Žatec) but the Austrians had burnt their magazines there before he arrived. The Prussian destroyed several other magazines at Komotau (present-day Chomutov), Luckowitz, Liboschowitz (present-day Libochovice), Worwitzow, Postelberg (present-day Postoloprty) and Brüx (present-day Most). During these operations, field marshal Count Leopold Joseph von Daun was at Jermer (present-day Jaroměř). This raid considerably delayed his operations that summer.

On 20 April Prince Henri, having reached his objectives, ordered to retire with some 3,000 prisoners and reached Saxony three days later.
