= Project for Democratic Union =

Germany-based think tank

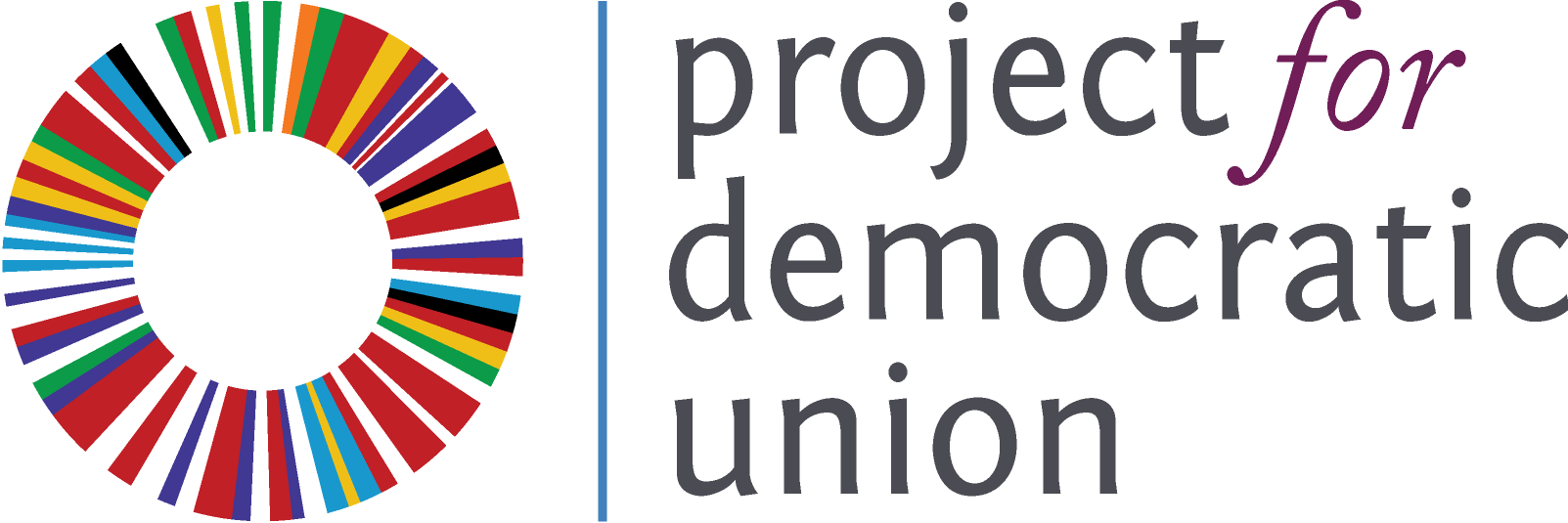
- Formation: January 2013
- Type: Policy institute
- Headquarters: Munich
- Location: Europe
- Official language: English
- Website: http://www.democraticunion.eu

The Project for Democratic Union (PDU), is a European political think-tank promoting a full political integration of the Eurozone. It advocates for Eurozone member states to unite politically along federal and more democratic lines. Originating within LMU Munich, the organisation operates offices in Munich, London, Brussels, Budapest and Lisbon.

== History and Political Goals ==
The PDU was founded in Munich in 2013. It is run mainly by students and has branches in London, Brussels, Budapest and Lisbon. Its President and co-founder, Brendan Simms, is Professor of the History of International Relations at Cambridge University. The Project for Democratic Union makes the case for a full political union of the Eurozone along federal lines. All its contributors are volunteers coming from a variety of nationalities and professional backgrounds. Its main focus is on students and young professionals.

== Supporters ==
A number of high-profile European politicians, academics and public figures have endorsed the project and support it with their work. These are notably the former EU High Representative for Foreign Affairs Javier Solana, the Italian politician Giorgio La Malfa, the British academic Lord Anthony Giddens, the German politician and academic Gesine Schwan, as well as the Hungarian academic and politician Péter Balázs, and Jiří Pehe from the Czech Republic.

== Statement of Principles ==
=== Preamble ===
The dire state of the Eurozone and the growing sense of disenfranchisement across the continent threaten the peace of the continent.

First, there are unmistakable signs of extremism within member states – most recently exemplified by the rise of an openly neo-Nazi party in Greece.

Secondly, because the weakness of Europe renders her unfit to deal with pressing external challenges, especially dealing with undemocratic states such as Iran, Russia, and a rising China.

Thirdly, because the economic imbalance between Germany and the European periphery poisons political discourse so that what was intended to unite now increasingly divides us.

The solution to these problems, Europe's 'democratic deficit', and her failure to address the current currency crisis can only be a 'federal' one and must be owned by the entire population of the Union democratically expressed. This is the only structure which will enable Europeans to mobilize in pursuit of their collective endeavors rather than against each other, and which will integrate Germany economically and militarily into the larger whole, without disenfranchising either the German people or any other population of the Union.

=== Principles ===
1. The Project for Democratic Union aims at creating a new, more powerful and more democratic Europe.
2. It believes in the principles of liberal Democracy and the right of Europe's citizens collectively to determine their own future and that of their continent.
3. The Union Parliament should be the most important political institution in Europe. It should consist of two chambers: a House of Citizens elected by population, and a Senate made up of two delegates from each of the constituent states.
4. The government of the Union should be led by an executive President elected by direct popular vote.
5. Some competences – such as foreign affairs, the armed services, and the common currency –which are now vested in the European Commission, the European Council, the Representative of the Union for Foreign Affairs and Security Policy, the European Parliament, and member states will henceforth be the sole preserve of the Union government. Other powers will be returned to national and regional level, including the setting of the minimum wage.
6. The Union should have at its command a single European army, with the monopoly of external force projection.
7. The new Union would be a full member of NATO. It would take over the United Nations Security Council seat and nuclear weaponry of France.
8. Europe's banks, bond markets, and other financial and economic institutions and structures must be integrated and subject to singular, European law. Individual national debts are to be merged into one European national debt.
9. All citizens of the Union are to undertake military or some other form of community service for the Union a year after leaving school.
10. The PDU supports free trade with all genuine democracies. Any other trade relationship will depend on a standard of workers' rights set by the Union being met.
11. The new Union should promote sustainable growth and be committed to transparency in government and administration.
12. The Union's banks, bond markets and other financial and economic institutions and structures must be integrated and subject to unified Union law and supervision.
13. All existing state debt should be federalized in a once-off move through the issue of Union Bonds to be backed by the entire tax revenue of the common currency zone. This should be accompanied by the introduction of an automatic balanced budget requirement for all national and regional administrations with a subsequent ‘no bail out clause’ and an insolvency purge of all insolvent private sector financial institutions, in which deposits, but not loans, shares or bonds, are to be refunded by the Union.
14. It is essential to create a European public sphere as legitimator, commentator, and forum for discussion as well as a check on Union, national, and regional politics.
15. The official language of the Union will be English, which is to be exclusively used for Union business and will be the sole language of command in the Union army. The other languages of the Union should be maintained for national and regional administrative, commercial, and educational business, and for daily use in their respective habitats.
16. Our expectation is that all current and aspirant members of the Eurozone will wish to join the Democratic Union. In the event of Great Britain declining to join the new Union as a full member, the closest possible economic, political, and military links should be maintained with London in a new European Confederation.
