= Fürstenbund =

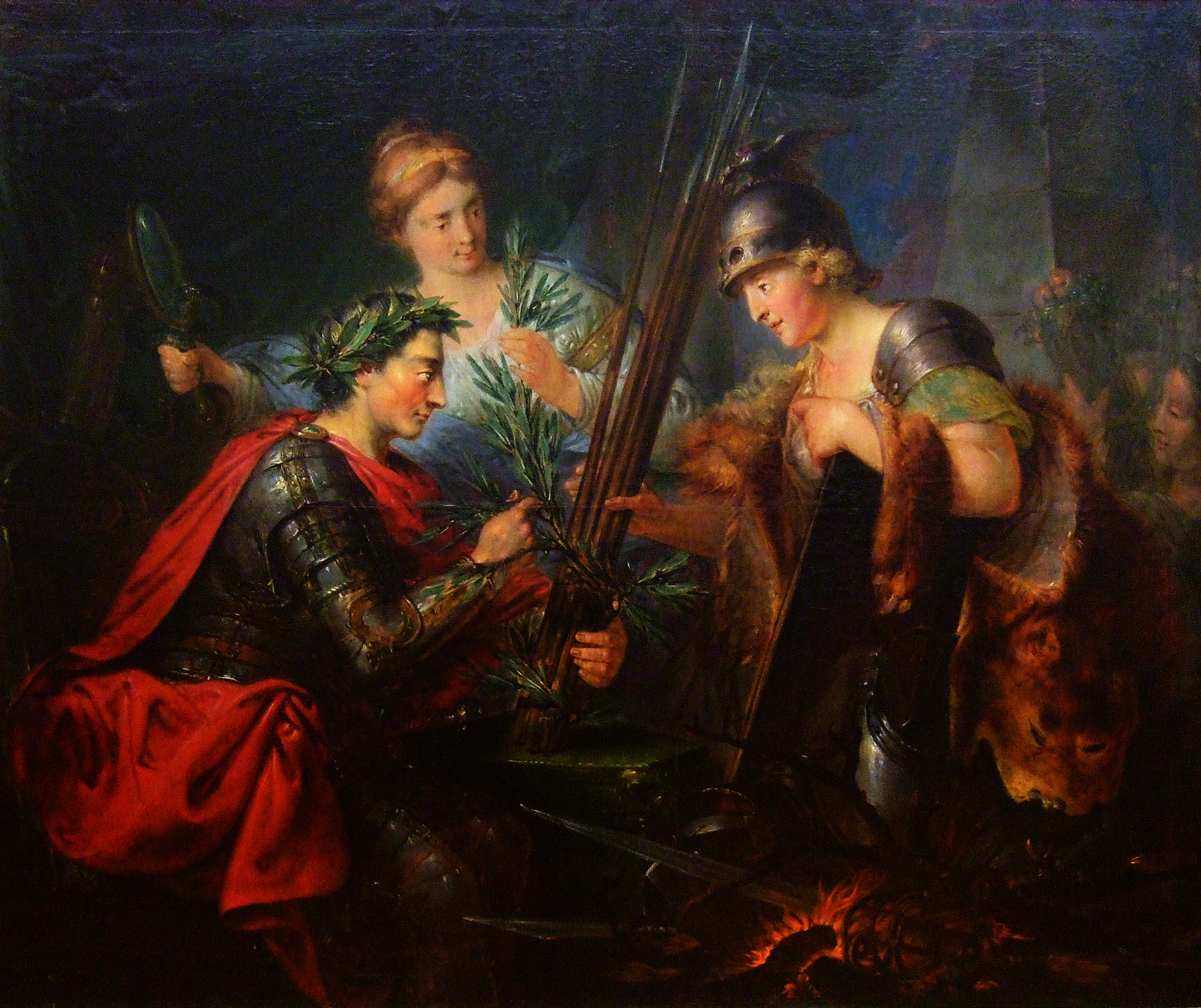
Frederick the Great binding together the League of Princes. Allegorical representation of 1786.

The (Deutsche) Fürstenbund (German: [(ˈdɔʏtʃə) ˈfʏʁstn̩bʊnt], "[German] League of Princes") was an alliance of mostly Protestant princes in the Holy Roman Empire formed in 1785 under the leadership of Frederick the Great of Prussia. The alliance, which initially comprised the three major northern states of Prussia, Hanover, and Saxony, was officially set up to safeguard the constitutional integrity and territorial status quo of the Empire, but more immediately to oppose the long-cherished ambition of Joseph II to add Bavaria to the Habsburg domains.

== Attempt to take over Bavaria ==
Soon after he became sole ruler of the Habsburg lands with the death of his mother Maria Theresa in 1780, Joseph II revived an old ambition and entered into negotiations with Elector Karl Theodor of the Palatinate and Bavaria with the aim of trading Bavaria for the Austrian Netherlands. Had the plan been brought to fruition, the Habsburgs would have augmented their core domains with a large contiguous German-speaking territory, while at the same time getting rid of far-away provinces that had proven to be difficult and costly to defend whenever Austria had been at war with France. For Karl Theodor, his interest in the projected deal was particularly a matter of prestige as he envisioned himself as the ruler, possibly with the title of king, of a reconstructed Duchy of Burgundy composed of the Southern Netherlands in addition to his existing possessions in the Lower and Upper Rhine region, such as the Electoral Palatinate of the Rhine and the duchies of Berg and Jülich.

== Opposition to Joseph II ==
The rumored deal proved unpalatable both to the ambitious Frederick II, who saw himself as the foremost German monarch, and to the Electors George III of Hanover, and Frederick Augustus III of Saxony who were disturbed by the far-reaching political and strategic implications of the projected territorial swap. Once they publicly declared their opposition through the creation of a Deutsche Fürstenbund, the rulers of lesser Protestant states, including Brunswick-Wolfenbüttel, Saxe-Gotha, Saxe-Weimar, Mecklenburg, Baden, and Ansbach, soon joined them. The Archbishop-Elector of Mainz, Archchancellor of the Empire, eventually gave his support, not least because it was known that Karl Theodor and Joseph II also mulled over the possible secularization of the Prince-Archbishopric of Salzburg, inconveniently wedged between Bavaria and Austria.

== Disintegration of the alliance ==
Joseph II was taken aback by the suddenness and strength of the opposition to his plan and after some minor sabre-rattling suspended his project. Having attained its true objective, the Fürstenbund gradually disintegrated and disappeared altogether after the outbreak of the French Revolution in 1789 and the death of Joseph II the year after.
