= Disarm (band) =

Swedish hardcore punk band

- Origin: Gothenburg, Sweden
- Genres: Hardcore punk
- Years active: 1984–1987
- Labels: Chickenbrain Records, Ägg Tapes & Records
- Members: Hans-Erik "Honsa" Therus; Charlie Schaloski; Patric Ceder; Esa Sairanen; Magnus "Manne" Björkroth

Disarm were a hardcore punk band from Gothenburg, Sweden formed in 1984.

== History ==
Formed under the name Total armsvett (Total Underarm Sweat) around 1983 but after a demo tape they changed their name to Disarm during the recording of their first EP Regeringstödda mord, which was released in 1984. They played both in Sweden and in Finland with bands like Kaaos, Anti Cimex and Mob 47. Their Demo was recorded in 1985 and one of the most remembered shows was during a winter trip to Vasa, Finland the same year. Also, in the summer of 1986, several shows were conducted in Stockholm, including one in Folkets Park in Järva, from which live recordings have resurfaced.

Other live recordings have been surfacing over time from a live show in 1985 at a Stockholm venue called Birkagården. In early 1986 they released their second EP "Dömd", which included a 6 panel fold out with lyrics/photos/information, and on the reverse side was a poster of their grim reaper character. Also on the grimreaper poster side were the words "WHILE THERE IS TIME".

In 1987, a 6-song MINI LP (with English lyrics) was recorded but never released. This was followed by their disbanding the same year. Recordings from the 1980s have resurfaced and are now being worked on for an upcoming Discography 2xLP / CD, produced by Disarm with the help of D-Takt & Råpunk Records (Sweden). The vocalist, Honsa, went on to become an indie film/documentary director. Charlie moved to Mozambique, Africa where he has a music studio. The Disarm Discography 2xLP/CD to-be-released was mixed there.

== Members ==
- Hans-Erik "Honsa" Therus - vocals
- Charlie Schaloski - guitar
- Patric Ceder - guitar
- Esa Sairanen - bass guitar
- Magnus "Manne" Björkroth - drums

== Discography ==
- Regeringstödda mord (1984)
- Dömd (1986)
- Discography 82-87 (2010)

=== Tapes ===
- Deodorant räcker inte (as Total armsvett, Ägg Tapes & Records, 1983)
- Demo Collection (unreleased, 1984-7)

=== Compilations ===
- Äggröra 3 (Ägg Tapes & Records, 1984, Cassette Tape)
- Really Fast vol. 3 (Really Fast Records, 1986, 12")
- Delirium Tremens (Delirium Tremens, 1986, Cassette Tape)
- GBG Hardcore 81-85 (Dolores Records, 1993, CD)
- Egg Mangel (Your Own Jailer Recs., 1993, Bootleg, 12")
- Varning För Punk (Distortion Records, 1994, CD)
