= Brendan Simms =

Academic

Brendan Peter Simms (born 1967, Dublin) is a Professor of the history of international relations in the Department of Politics and International Studies at the University of Cambridge.

== Early life ==
Brendan Simms is the son of Anngret and David Simms, a professor of mathematics. He is also a grand-nephew of Brian Goold-Verschoyle, a member of the Communist Party of Ireland, who became a Soviet spy and died in a Soviet gulag in 1942.

Simms was brought up in the Roman Catholic faith. He studied at Trinity College Dublin, where he was elected a Scholar in 1986, before completing his doctoral dissertation, Anglo-Prussian relations, 1804–1806: The Napoleonic Threat, at Peterhouse, Cambridge, under the supervision of Tim Blanning in 1993.

== Career ==
Simms became a Fellow of Peterhouse and now also serves as Professor of the History of European International Relations at the University of Cambridge, where he lectures and leads seminars, specializing in international history since 1945.

In addition to his academic work, Simms also serves as the president of the Henry Jackson Society, which advocates the view that supporting and promoting liberal democracy and liberal interventionism should be an integral part of Western foreign policy, and as President of the Project for Democratic Union, a Munich-based student-organised think tank.

He has advocated that the Eurozone should create a United States of Europe, and also that this should continue the traditions of the Holy Roman Empire, appointing an elected Emperor.

== Europe: The Struggle for Supremacy ==
Norman Stone praised Europe: The Struggle for Supremacy as "lively and erudite". He also praised the book for the focus on Germany and Simms's knowledge of it though he qualifies it by saying Simms is stronger on the 18th century than the 20th century due to the volume of material to be covered in the latter.

Richard J. Evans was critical of the book, saying that Simms had overly favoured observations by A. J. P. Taylor of a Hobbesian view of European history, focusing on periods of strife while neglecting periods of cooperation between European states. Evans described the book as a "one-sided picture", adding that even Simms has to acknowledge that there were periods of cooperation.

Noel Malcolm praised Simms as "a historian of unusual range and ability", saying that "knowing what he wants to say is one of Simms's strengths". On the whole, Malcolm praised the book, though regarding Simms' emphasis on the primacy of foreign policy in European affairs, Malcolm did wonder if there may be counterexamples, such as those where the foreign/domestic distinction is less clear.

== Hitler: Only the World Was Enough ==
Evans was also critical of Hitler: Only the World Was Enough, arguing that the book makes a number of false claims, such as the claim that Hitler embraced socialism, and concluding that Simms "hasn't written a biography in any meaningful sense of the word; he has written a tract that instrumentalises the past for present-day political purposes."

British historian Richard Overy described Hitler: Only the World Was Enough as a "thoroughly thought-provoking and stimulating biography which all historians of the Third Reich will have to take seriously," but also criticized the book for downplaying Hitler's imperial ambitions in Eastern Europe and for giving Hitler too much credit for creating outcomes.

== Bibliography ==
=== Books ===
- The Struggle for Mastery in Germany, 1779–1850 (Palgrave MacMillan, 1998)
- Unfinest Hour: Britain and the Destruction of Bosnia (Penguin, 2001)
- Three Victories and a Defeat: The Rise and Fall of the First British Empire, 1714–1783 (Penguin, 2007)
- Europe: The Struggle for Supremacy, 1453 to the Present (Allen Lane, 2013)
- The Longest Afternoon: The Four Hundred Men Who Decided the Battle of Waterloo. Allen Lane. 2014.
- Britain's Europe: A Thousand Years of Conflict and Cooperation (Penguin, 2017)
- (with Charlie Laderman) Donald Trump: The Making of a Worldview (I.B. Tauris & Co. Ltd., 2017)
- Hitler: A Global Biography (Basic Books, 2019) ISBN 978-0465022373
- (with Charlie Laderman) Hitler's American Gamble: Pearl Harbor and the German March to Global War (Penguin, 2021) ISBN 978-0241423509
- (with Steven McGregor and David DeVries) The Silver Waterfall: How America Won the War in the Pacific at Midway (Hachette, 2022) ISBN 978-1541701373
- The Return of the Great Powers (Basic Books, 2026) ISBN 978-1541605831

=== Critical studies and reviews of Simms' work ===
The longest afternoon

- Heffer, Simon (21 November 2014). "The unfinished battles of Waterloo". New Statesman. 143 (5237): 44–45.

== See also ==
- European History
- Bosnian War
- British Empire
- T. C. W. Blanning
