= Ingrid (given name) =

- Pronunciation: English: /ˈɪŋɡrɪd/ ING-grid; German: [ˈɪŋɡʁɪt] Swedish: [ˈɪ̌ŋːrɪd] Norwegian: [ˈɪ̀ŋrɪ] Danish: [ˈiŋˌʁiːðˀ]
- Gender: Female
- Name day: 5 October

Origin
- Origin: Fennoscandia
- Meaning: fair, beautiful

Other names
- Related names: Ingrida, Ingrīda, Ingirid, Ingris, Ingerid, Ingfrid, Ingri, Inger, Inkeri

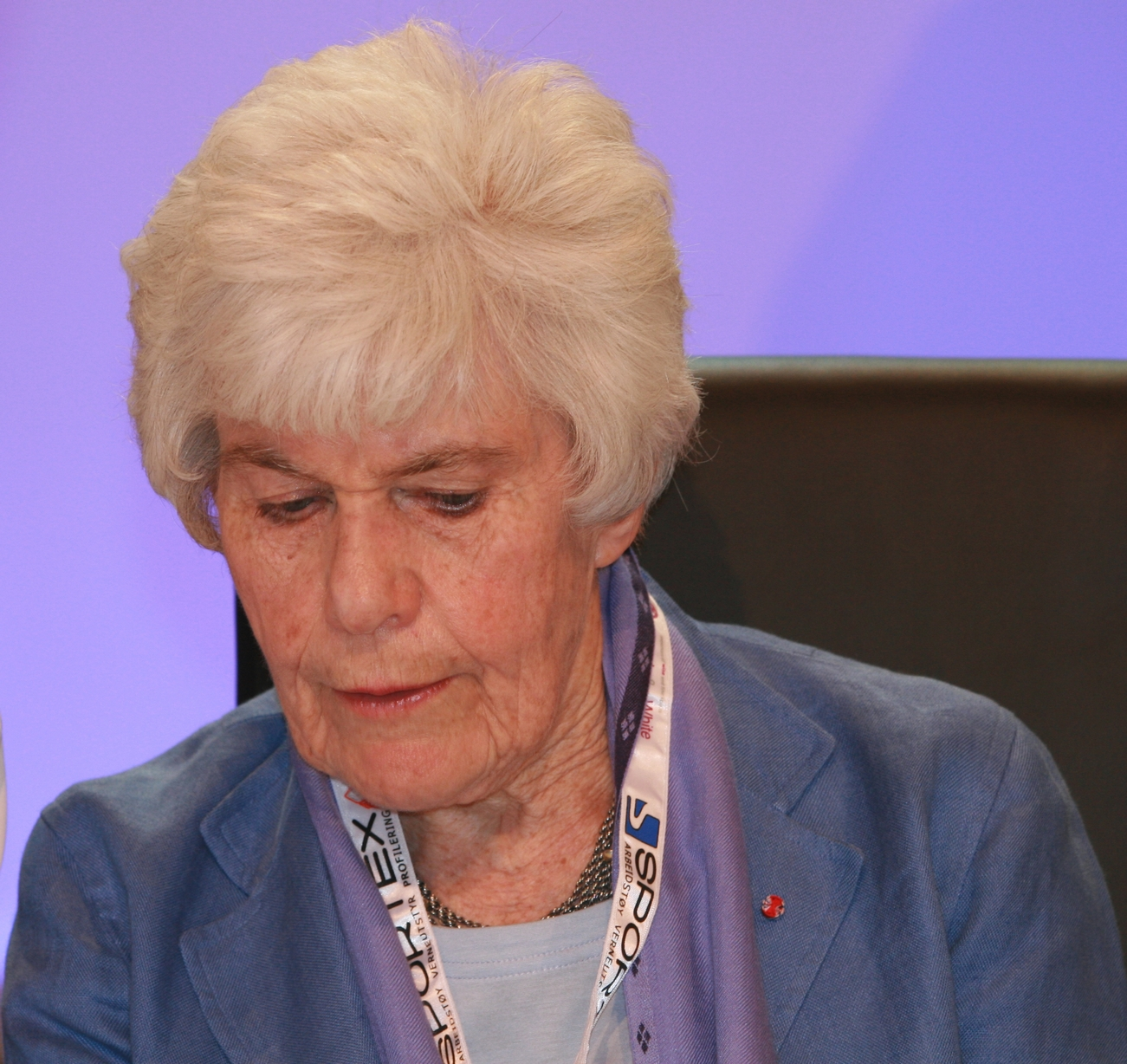
Ingrid Espelid Hovig

Ingrid is a feminine given name. It continues the Old Norse name Ingiríðr, which was a short form of Ingfríðr, composed of the theonym Ing and the element fríðr "beloved; beautiful" common in Germanic feminine given names. The name Ingrid (more rarely in the variant Ingerid, Ingris or Ingfrid; short forms Inga, Inger, Ingri) remains widely given in all of Scandinavia, with the highest frequency in Norway. Norwegian usage peaked in the interbellum period, with more than 2% of newborn girls so named in 1920; popularity declined gradually over the 1930s to 1960s, but picked up again in the late 1970s, peaking above 1.5% in the 1990s. Ingrid was also among the most popular names for girls in Germany from the 1920s to the 1950s.

== People ==
- Ingerid of Denmark (11th century), Danish princess, Norwegian Queen consort
- Saint Ingrid of Skänninge (13th century), Swedish Roman Catholic abbess
- Ingrid of Sweden (1910–2000), Swedish princess, Queen Consort of Denmark
- Ingrid Alberini (In-Grid, born 1973), Italian singer
- Ingrid Alexandra (born 2004), Norwegian crown princess
- Ingrid Andreae (born 1961), Swedish politician
- Ingrid Andress (born 1991), American singer-songwriter
- Ingrid Antičević-Marinović (born 1957), Croatian lawyer and politician
- Ingrid Bachmann (born 1958), Canadian artist
- Ingrid Baeyens (born 1956), Belgian mountaineer
- Ingrid Becker-Inglau (born 1946), German politician
- Ingrid Bolsø Berdal (born 1980), Norwegian actress
- Ingrid van Bergen (1931–2025), German actress
- Ingrid Bergman (1915–1982), Swedish actress
- Íngrid Betancourt (born 1961), Colombian politician
- Ingrid Bisu (born 1987), Romanian–American actress, producer, and screenwriter
- Ingrid Bjørnov (born 1963), Norwegian musician
- Ingrid Bjoner (1927–2006), Norwegian soprano
- Ingrid Bruce (1940–2012), Swedish civil engineer
- Ingrid Bruckert (born 1952), German field hockey player
- Ingrid Ann Buffonge, Montserratian politician
- Ingrid Burley (born 1986), American singer and rapper
- Ingrid Burman (born 1952), Swedish politician
- Ingrid Caven (born 1938), German actress
- Ingrid Ciprian-Matthews, American journalist and television producer
- Ingrid Chauvin (born 1973), French actress
- Ingrid Chavez (born 1965), American poet, vocalist, songwriter and photographer
- Ingrid Christensen (1891–1976), Norwegian explorer and First woman in Antarctica
- Ingrid Coenradie (born 1987), Dutch politician
- Ingrid Croce (born 1947), American singer-songwriter
- Ingrid Daubechies (born 1954), Belgian physicist and mathematician
- Ingrid Deltenre (born 1960), Dutch-Swiss manager
- Ingrid Ellis (1948–1981) was a police officer, singer
- Ingrid Engen (born 1998), Norwegian international football player
- Ingrid Syrstad Engen (born 1998), Norwegian footballer
- Ingrid Falk (born 1960), Swedish painter and installation artist
- Ingrid Fliter (born 1973), Argentinian classical pianist
- Ingrid Detter de Frankopan (born 1936), Swedish scholar
- Ingrid García-Jonsson (born 1991), Swedish-Spanish actress
- Ingrid Godon (born 1958), Flemish illustrator
- Ingrid del Carmen Montes González (born 1985), Chemistry Professor and Director-at-large at ACS since 2013
- Ingrid Guimarães (born 1972), Brazilian actress and comedian
- Ingrid Haebler (1929–2023), Austrian pianist
- Ingrid Hafner (1936–1994), British actress
- Ingrid Haubold (born 1943), German opera singer
- Ingrid Hernandez (born 1988), Colombian race walker
- Ingrid Hjelmseth (born 1980), Norwegian footballer
- Ingrid Holford (1920–2012), English meteorologist and author
- Ingrid Hornef (born 1940), German artist
- Ingrid van Houten-Groeneveld (1921–2015), Dutch astronomer
- Ingrid Espelid Hovig (1924–2018), Norwegian chef and television personality
- Ingrid Isotamm (born 1979), Estonian actress
- Ingrid Janbell (born 1955), Swedish actress, director and lecturer
- Ingrid Jensen (born 1966), Canadian trumpet player and composer
- Ingrid Jetter, Argentine politician
- Ingrid Johansson (born 1965), Swedish footballer
- Ingrid Jonker (1933–1965), South African poet
- Ingrid Kavelaars (born 1971), Canadian actress
- Ingrid Kivirähk (1931–2024), Estonian actress
- Ingrid de Kok (born 1951), South African author
- Ingrid Kristiansen (born 1956), Norwegian long-distance runner
- Ingrid Landmark Tandrevold (born 1996), Norwegian biathlete
- Ingrid Leary (born 1967/1968), New Zealand politician
- Ingrid Leijendekker (born 1975), Dutch water polo player
- Ingrid Levavasseur (born 1987), French activist
- Ingrid Lewis-Martin (born 1961), American chaplain and political advisor
- Ingrid Lindblad (born 2000), Swedish professional golfer
- Ingrid van Lubek (born 1971), Dutch triathlete
- Ingrid Lukas (born 1984), Estonian musician
- Ingrid Luterkort (1910–2011), Swedish actress
- Ingrid Lyne (1975–2016), American nurse and murder victim
- Ingrid Martins (born 1996), Brazilian tennis player
- Íngrid Martz (born 1979), Mexican actress
- Ingrid Mattson (born 1963), Canadian activist and scholar
- Ingrid Michaelson (born 1979), American singer
- Ingrid Michon (born 1976), Dutch civil servant and politician
- Ingrid Miethe (born 1962), German social scientist
- Ingrid Moses-Scatliffe (born 1969), British lawyer politician from the British Virgin Islands
- Ingrid Nargang (1929–2019), Austrian judge and contemporary historian
- Ingrid Neel (born 1998), American-Estonian professional tennis player
- Ingrid Newkirk (born 1949), American animal rights activist
- Ingrid Nilsen (born 1989), American video blogger
- Ingrid Noll (born 1935), German author
- Ingrid Olava (born 1981), Norwegian singer and musician
- Ingrid Olerinskaya (born 1992), Russian actress and model
- Ingrid Oliveira (born 1996), Brazilian competitive diver
- Ingrid Oliver (born 1977) British comedienne
- Ingrid Park (born 1971), New Zealand television actress
- Ingrid Paul (born 1964), Dutch speed skater
- Ingrid Pedersen (1933–2012), Swedish aviator
- Ingrid Persaud (born 1966), Trinidad and Tobago writer, artist, academic
- Ingrid Peters (born 1954), German singer
- Ingrid Pitt (1937–2010), Polish-British actress
- Ingrid Pollard (born 1953), British artist and photographer
- Ingrid Puusta (born 1990), Estonian windsurfer
- Ingrid Ragnvaldsdotter (12th century), Queen Consort of Norway
- Ingrid Rimland (1936–2017), American psychologist and author
- Ingrid Marie Rivera (born 1983), Puerto Rican actress and model
- Ingrid Rivera Rocafort, Puerto Rican businesswoman
- Ingrid Robeyns (born 1972), Belgian-Dutch philosopher
- Ingrid Rodríguez (born 1991), Ecuadorian footballer
- Ingrid Rubio (born 1975), Spanish actress
- Ingrid Rüütel (born 1935), Estonian folklorist and philologist, First Lady of Estonia
- Ingrid Schjelderup (1932–2022), Norwegian politician
- Ingrid Schjelderup (born 1987), Norwegian footballer
- Ingrid Silva (born 1988/89), Brazilian ballet dancer
- Ingrid Sischy (1952–2015), South African-born American art and fashion editor
- Ingrid Skop, American ob-gyn and anti-abortion activist
- Ingrid Stahmer (1942–2020), German politician
- Ingrid Steeger (1947–2023), German actress and comedian
- Ingrid Stengård (born 1975), Finnish mountain bike orienteer
- Ingrid Stöckl (born 1969), Austrian alpine skier
- Ingrid Superstar (born 1945, disappeared 1986), American actress, poet and Warhol superstar
- Ingrid Svantepolksdotter (floruit 1350), Swedish noble and abbess
- Ingrid Thulin (1926–2004), Swedish film actress
- Ingrid Tørlen (born 1979), Norwegian beach volleyball player
- Ingrid Vandebosch (born 1970), Belgian model and actress
- Ingrid Vanderveldt (born 1970), American businesswoman, media personality and investor
- Ingrid Veninger (born 1968), Canadian actress, writer, director, producer, and film professor
- Ingrid Visser (born 1966), New Zealand scientist of Dutch parentage
- Ingrid Visser (1977–2013), Dutch volleyball player
- Ingrid Wells (born 1989), American soccer player
- Ingrid Gärde Widemar (1912–2009), Swedish lawyer and politician
- Ingrid Wilhite (1959–2008), American filmmaker and musician
- Ingrid Wildi Merino (born 1963), Chilean-born Swiss video artist
- Ingrid Wilm (born 1998), Canadian swimmer
- Ingrid Ylva (13th century), Swedish noblewoman
- Princess Ingrid Alexandra (born 2004), princess of Norway

== Fictional characters ==
- Ingrid, from television series Once Upon a Time
- Ingrid, from television series Sesame Street
- Ingrid, a character from the fighting game series Street Fighter and the video game Capcom Fighting Evolution
- Ingrid Beauchamp, from novel Witches of East End and television series Witches of East End
- Ingrid Bottomlow, from the computer game Gnome Ranger and its sequel Ingrid's Back
- Ingrid Avellan Cortez, from the Spy Kids film trilogy
- Ingrid Dracula, from horror drama comedy Young Dracula
- Ingrid Fletcher, from television series Porridge and Going Straight
- Ingrid Brandl Galatea, from the video game Fire Emblem: Three Houses
- Ingrid Giraffe, from the animated television series My Gym Partner's a Monkey
- Ingrid Navarro, an antagonist from the Mexican telenovela Abismo de pasión
- Ingrid Third, from the animated television series Fillmore!
- Ingrid Thorburn, from the black comedy drama Ingrid Goes West
