= Annie Martin (artist) =

Canadian artist

- Born: Pittsburgh, PA, USA
- Education: Concordia University
- Known for: sound artist, installation artist
- Awards: Millennium Prize
- Years active: 1995–present
- Website: http://people.uleth.ca/~annie.martin/

Annie Martin is a Canadian artist who works with installation, audio, video and textiles. Her work has been exhibited throughout Canada and internationally. Martin lives in Lethbridge, Alberta where she teaches at the University of Lethbridge. She previously lived and worked in Montreal.

== Works ==
Martin's creative practice includes installation, audio and video art, textiles, drawing and performative practice. Her work privileges the senses, experimentation, speculation and the body using ephemeral materials and audio with elements of drawing, writing, listening and walking.

She collaborated with Nikki Forrest and Nelson Henricks on a video collaboration titled "My Heart" in 2001. Since 2004 she has conducted listening walks as a form of research and a contemplative performance practice. In 2008, Martin completed a residency at OBORO, where she produced two new audio CD projects titled music for insomniacs and symphonie interne. Her exhibition (im) permeable (2008) featured a group of ladies' trench coats hanging spaciously on opposing walls of the Gallery. Each coat was wired to a separate live audio feed coming from elsewhere in the mall. Listeners needed to physically lean into each coat to hear the sound. Art writer Amy Fung reported that "the perception experienced is different from physically absorbing a crowd in the moment; the experience is more of a reception, akin to eavesdropping into a wholly other place and time."

In 2009, Martin's work was featured in "Into the Streets," a series presented by the Southern Alberta Art Gallery, which included a number of city-based installations and performances. Martin presented guided Listening Walks of urban sounds alongside eight other Canadian artists (Kerri Reid, Rita McKeough, Kelly Andres, Ingrid Bachmann, James Graham, Lyla Rye, Allison Hrabluik, and Doug Scholes).

=== Exhibitions ===
Selected exhibitions:

- flotilla, CASA, (2015)
- Dessins temporels, Galerie du Nouvel-Ontario, Sudbury, ON, (2014)
- Everything that rises and temporal drawings, Pith Gallery, (2013)
- (im) permeable, New Gallery, Eau Claire Market, Calgary, AB, (2008)
- Collecting Everyday, University of Lethbridge Art Gallery, co-curated with Lorne Beug and Jennifer Stillwell. (2007)
- Nocturne: silent video, Southern Alberta Art Gallery, co-curated with Michael Campbell, (2006)
- Exhilaration and Dysphoria: 3 Canadian Video Artists in Berlin, Optica at ArtForum Berlin, (2003)
- Geoffrey Hendricks: A Retrospective of Performance Photographs, Galerie Articule, Montreal, QC, (1997)
- Craft by Artists, Galerie Articule, Montreal, QC, (1995)
- Queer Art Video Series, Image et Nation Gay and Lesbian Film Festival, Montreal, QC, (1995)

== Bibliography ==
- Black, Anthea "From the trenches", FFWD, Calgary, AB, 2008
- Fung, Amy "(im)permeable by Annie Martin", shotgunreview.ca, 2008
- Black, Anthea "What if we heard everything? Nothing?", FFWD, 2007
- "48 rooms, 48 hours", CD ROM catalogue, 2002
- "Multiplier: Points de vue sur l'art actuel des femmes", Galerie La Centrale, 1998
- "Whisper in my Ear" Exhibition publication + CD ROM catalogue, AKA Gallery, Saskatoon, SK. 1997
- "Doors", Exhibition publication, Eyelevel Gallery, Halifax, 1997
- "Résidu", catalogue accompanying Résider, (Galerie La Centrale), Montreal, 1995
- Lamontagne, Valérie, "Résider", C Magazine, (Fall 1995), Toronto ON, 1995
- Lamontagne, Valérie, "Brand New Visions", Hour Magazine, Montreal, QC, 1994
- Lamontagne, Valérie, "Annie Martin and Freda Guttman", Parachute 76
