= Ingegerd =

Ingegerd (Old Norse Ingigerðr, Ingigærðr) is a Scandinavian feminine given name, from the theonym Ing combined with the element garðr "enclosure, protection". The name Inger is a short form. In Finnish the equivalence of Ingegerd is Inkeri.

Ingegerd (less commonly in the variant Ingegärd) was most popularly given in modern Sweden during the 1920s to 1930s, but the name remains in wide use today. The name is also found in Denmark and in Norway (also in the variant Ingegjerd and Ingjerd) but much more rarely than in Sweden. According to the respective statistic offices, as of 2012 there were 7792 people called Ingegerd in Sweden, compared to 127 in Norway and 76 in Denmark. In Finland, which has an ethnic Swedish population of about 0.34 million, there were 2594 people called Ingegerd as of May 2013, as in Sweden peaking among the generation of women born between 1920 and 1940, with the name given six times to girls born in three-year period 2010–2012).

== People called Ingegerd ==
- Ingegerd Olofsdotter of Sweden (1001–1050)
- Ingegerd Knudsdatter (fl. 1100)
- Ingegerd Birgersdotter (fl. 1200), Swedish queen consort
- Ingegerd Knutsdotter (1356–1412)
- Ingegärd, Swedish princess (died 1204), daughter of King Sverker I of Sweden, abbess
- Ingegerd of Norway, Swedish queen consort 1096

== See also ==
- Ingrid (given name)
