= Ingrīda =

Female given name

- Gender: Female
- Name day: 19 March

Origin
- Region of origin: Latvia

Other names
- Related names: Ingrid, Ingrida

Ingrīda is a Latvian feminine given name, a cognate of the name Ingrid. Notable people with the given name include:

- Ingrīda Amantova (born 1960), Latvian luger
- Ingrīda Andriņa (1944–2015), Latvian actress
- Ingrīda Circene (born 1956), Latvian politician
- Ingrīda Kadaka (born 1967), Latvian artist, book designer and illustrator
- Ingrīda Priedīte (born 1954), Latvian chess Grandmaster
- Ingrīda Ūdre (born 1958), Latvian politician
- Ingrīda Verbele (born 1948), Latvian sprinter
