= Michael Denis =

Austrian Catholic priest, Jesuit, poet, bibliographer and lepidopterist (1729–1800)

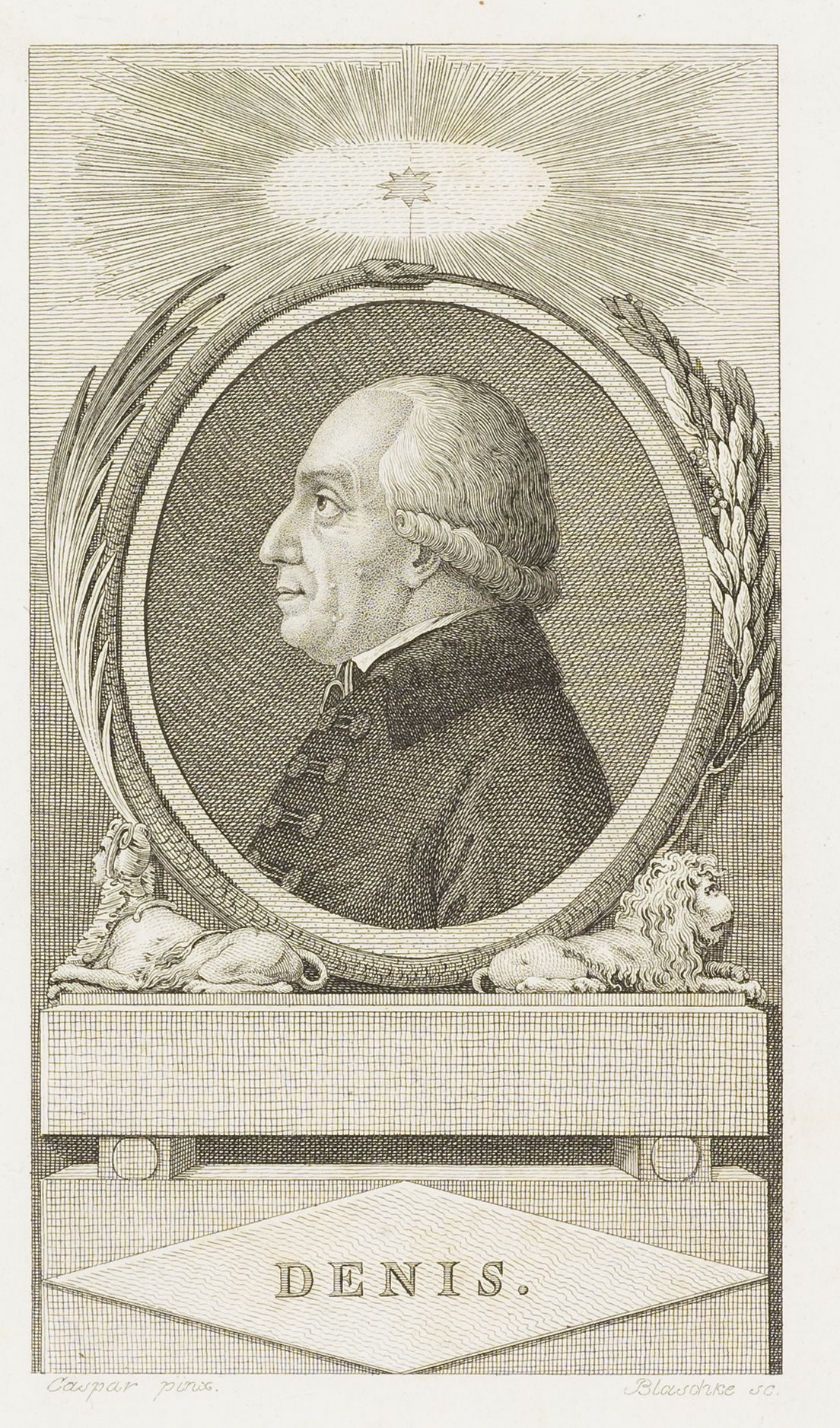
- Michael Denis
- Born: Johann Nepomuk Cosmas Michael Denis; 27 September 1729; Schärding, Electorate of Bavaria, Holy Roman Empire
- Died: 29 September 1800 (aged 71); Vienna, Archduchy of Austria, Holy Roman Empire
- Other names: Sined the Bard
- Occupation(s): Austrian Catholic priest, Jesuit entomologist and writer

Johann Nepomuk Cosmas Michael Denis, also: Sined (Note: Sined is an anagram of Denis.) the Bard, (27 September 1729 – 29 September 1800) was an Austrian Catholic priest and Jesuit, who is best known as a poet, bibliographer, and lepidopterist.

== Life ==
Denis was born at Schärding, located on the Inn River, then ruled by the Electorate of Bavaria, in 1729, the son of Johann Rudolph Denis, who taught him Latin at an early age. At the age of ten, he was enrolled to be educated by the Jesuits at their college in Passau. After completing his studies in 1747, he entered the novitiate of the Jesuits in Vienna.

In 1749, following this initial formation period, Denis was sent to carry his period of Regency at Jesuit colleges in Graz and Klagenfurt. He was ordained a priest in 1757. Two years later, he was appointed professor at the Theresianum in Vienna, a Jesuit college. After the suppression of the Jesuits in 1773, and the subsequent closing of the college, he remained there to maintain its library until 1784, at which time he was made second custodian of the library of the royal court, and seven years later became its chief librarian.

Denis died in Vienna in 1800.

== Writings ==
A warm admirer of Klopstock, Denis was one of the leading members of the group of so-called bards; and his original poetry, published under the title Die Lieder Sineds des Barden (1772), shows all the extravagances of the bardic movement. He is best remembered as the translator of Ossian (1768–1769; also published together with his own poems in 5 volumes as Ossians und Sineds Lieder, 1784).

More important than either Denis' original poetry or his translations were his efforts to familiarise the Austrians with the literature of Northern Germany; his Sammlung kürzerer Gedichte aus den neuern Dichtern Deutschlandes, 3 volumes (1762–1766), was in this respect invaluable. He has also left a number of bibliographical compilations, Grundriss der Bibliographie und Bücherkunde (1774), Grundriss der Literaturgeschichte (1776), Einleitung in die Bücherkunde (1777), and Wiens Buchdruckergeschichte bis 1560 (1782).

Ossians und Sineds Lieder have not been reprinted since 1791; but a selection of Denis' poetry, edited by Richard Hamel, is to found in volume 48 (1884) of Kürschners Deutsche Nationalliteratur. His Literarischer Nachlass was published by Joseph Friedrich Freiherr von Retzer in 1802 (2 volumes), two years after Denis had died in Vienna, aged 71.

== Scientist ==
In addition to his literary output, working with Ignaz Schiffermüller, Denis formed an early collection of butterflies and moths, and published the first catalogue of the Lepidoptera found around Vienna. His collection was kept at the Hofburg Palace and was destroyed in course of the Revolution of 1848.

== Works ==
- Poetische Bilder der meisten kriegerischen Vorgänge in Europa seit dem Jahr 1756, Wien 1760
- Die Gedichte Ossians, eines alten celtischen Dichters, aus dem Englischen übersetzt, Wien 1768–69
- Einleitung in die Bücherkunde, Wien 1777–1778
- Die Lieder Sineds des Barden, Wien 1772 (which includes the text to Mozart's Gibraltar).
- Systematisches Verzeichniß der Schmetterlinge der Wienergegend herausgegeben von einigen Lehrern am k. k. Theresianum (with Ignaz Schiffermüller), Wien 1775
- Grundriß der Bibliographie, Wien 1777
- Die Merkwürdigkeiten der k. k. garellischen öffentlichen Bibliothek am Theresiano, Wien 1780
- Bibliotheca typographica Vindobonensis ab anno 1482 usque ad annum 1560, Wien 1782 (auch deutsch Wiens Buchdruckergeschichte bis 1560, Wien 1782–1793)
- Ossian und Sineds Lieder, 5 Bände, 1784
- Kurze Erzählung der Streitigkeiten über die alten Urkunden, Heidelberg 1785
- Zurückerinnerungen, Wien 1794
- Carmina quaedam, Wien 1794
- Beschäftigungen mit Gott schon in dem 12. Jahrhundert gesammelt, Wien 1799

== Literature ==
- Paul von Hofmann-Wellenhof: Michael Denis. Ein Beitrag zur deutsch-oesterreichischen Literaturgeschichte des XVIII. Jahrhunderts. Wagner, Innsbruck 1881

== See also ==
- List of Austrian writers
