= Gibraltar Anthem =

National song of British overseas territory

- Territorial anthem of Gibraltar
- Lyrics: Peter Emberley, 1994
- Music: Peter Emberley, 1994
- Adopted: 18 October 1994

The "Gibraltar Anthem" is the national song and local anthem of the British overseas territory of Gibraltar, adopted in 1994. In common with the United Kingdom, Crown dependencies and other British territories, the official national anthem of Gibraltar is "God Save the King".

"Gibraltar Anthem" was chosen in a 1994 competition announced in The Times newspaper in the UK. Both the lyrics and music were composed by Peter Emberley, a composer from Dorset who had never visited Gibraltar. The song by Emberley was selected by a panel of British and Gibraltarian judges from among 200 entries.

== History ==
The 1994 song was pre-dated by the 1969 song "The Gibraltar Anthem (Our Rock, Our Home, Our Pride)", composed during the ongoing sovereignty dispute between Gibraltar and Spain. Also known as "The Gibraltar Anthem 'Rock of Ages'", the older song was composed by BBC producer Brian Willey, who was married to a Gibraltarian, with lyrics by Ronnie Bridges. Willey and Bridges, who had been jurors in the 1967 and 1968 Gibraltar Song Festivals, had submitted it to the 1969 festival under a pseudonym. It was later recorded by Dorothy Squires and by the Gibraltar Cathedral Choir, and performed at St Clement Danes church in London in 2004.

Starting in 1992, "The Gibraltar Anthem" was sung every 10 September by the general public at the Gibraltar National Day celebrations. Balloons were released during the anthem, but this was stopped in favour of red and white ticker paper for environmental reasons.

== Lyrics ==
Chorus:
Gibraltar, Gibraltar,
The rock on which I stand,
May you be forever free,
Gibraltar my own land.

I
Mighty pillar, rock of splendour,
Guardian of the sea,
Port of hope in times of need,
Rich in history.

Chorus

II
God give grace to this our homeland,
Help us live as one,
Strong in freedom, truth and justice,
Let this be our song.

Chorus:
Gibraltar, Gibraltar,
The rock on which I stand,
May you be forever free,
𝄆 Gibraltar! 𝄇 My own land!

== See also ==
- Llévame Donde Nací
- Bardengesang auf Gibraltar: O Calpe! Dir donnert's am Fuße
- List of British anthems
