= Baeyens =

Baeyens is a surname. Notable people with the surname include:

- Armand Baeyens (1928–2013), Belgian cyclist
- August Baeyens (1895–1966), Belgian classical violinist and composer
- Dominique Baeyens (born 1956), Belgian volleyball coach
- Roxie Baeyens (born 1997), Belgian-Filipino actress and beauty pageant titleholder
- Ingrid Baeyens (born 1956), Belgian mountaineer
- Jan Baeyens (born 1957), Belgian racing cyclist
