= Nikki Forrest =

Scottish-Canadian artist

Nik Forrest (formerly known as Nikki Forrest)
- Born: 1964 (age 61–62); Edinburgh, Scotland
- Education: University of Saskatchewan, Concordia University
- Works: Static
- Website: https://nikforrest.org/

Nik Forrest (born 1964) is a visual and media artist who lives in Montreal. Born in Edinburgh, their practice includes drawing, installation and sound art. They completed a Bachelor of Fine Arts from the University of Saskatchewan in 1985 and a master's degree in open media from Concordia University in 1995.

Forrest is best known for their short experimental videos. They have participated in international artist residencies including the CALQ residency in Buenos Aires, Argentina and The Canada Council studio at Cite Internationale des Arts in Paris. Their work is included in collections at The National Gallery of Canada, The Saskatchewan Arts Board and Concordia University.

Forrest directed the film My Heart the Rock Star in 2001 as part of a collaborative video series with artists Annie Martin and Nelson Henricks titled "My Heart." This was a reflective piece focusing on childhood memory and gender fluctuation. Forrest has worked on sound and video performances including work on Leibig12 in collaboration with audio artist Nancy Tobin in Berlin in 2014.

== Expositions ==
Selected solo and group exhibitions:

- 2019 - Où sommes-nous, Kunsthalle Mulhouse, Mulhouse, France
- 2018 - Où sommes-nous, Oboro, Montréal, Canada
- 2018 - Transformables (V), Latitude 53, Edmonton, Canada
- 2018 - Contaminations, Eastern Bloc, Montréal, Canada
- 2016 - Transformables, Eastern Bloc, Montréal, Canada
- 2016 - Sounds Like, PAVED Arts, Saskatoon, Canada
- 2015 - Pictures For Listening, Vox, Montreal, Canada
- 2012 - Flip/Bend, La Centrale, Montreal, Canada
- 2009 - Observations, Part 2, SBC Galerie d'art contemporain, Montréal, Canada
- 2009 - Observations, Part 1, SBC Galerie d'art contemporain, Montréal, Canada
- 2005 - Ectoplasmes, Société des arts technologiques, Montréal, Canada
- 2004 - Video Heroes: Music Videos by Artists, Cambridge Galleries, Ontario, Canada
- 2003 - Placing Spaces, Spacing Places, MSVU Art Gallery, Halifax, Canada
- 2002 - Drift, Galerie Powerhouse, Montréal, Canada, collaboration with Jackie Gallant
- 1999 - Stravaig/Errance, Videographe Gallery, Montreal, Canada
- 1998 - Video d'Ecossee, Articule Gallery, Montreal, Canada
- 1995 - Noise Box / Temporary Room, Optica Gallery, Montreal and AKA Gallery, Saskatoon, Saskatchewan

== See also ==
- Redfern, Christine. “Radioactive Video Stars” Montreal Mirror, Vol. 19 No. 24, 2003.
- Interview with Forrest by Mél Hogan.
- Samples of Forrest's work at GROUPE INTERVENTION VIDÉO
