= Ingrida (given name) =

- Gender: Female
- Name day: 2 September

Origin
- Region of origin: Lithuania

Other names
- Related names: Ingrid, Ingrīda

Ingrida is a predominantly Lithuanian feminine given name, a cognate of the name Ingrid. Notable people with the given name include:

- Ingrida Ardišauskaitė (born 1993), Lithuanian cross-country skier
- Ingrida Šimonytė (born 1974), Lithuanian economist and politician, Prime Minister of Lithuania
