= Inger (given name) =

Inger is a Scandinavian given feminine name, originally short for a name in Ing-, either Ingrid or Ingegerd.

- Inger Ottesdotter Rømer (c. 1475–1555), Norwegian landowner and political intriguer
- Aud Inger Aure (1942–2023), Norwegian politician
- Inger Ash Wolfe (21st century), Canadian writer
- Inger Aufles (born 1941), Norwegian cross-country skier
- Inger Berggren (1934–2019), Swedish singer
- Inger Bjørnbakken (1933–2021), Norwegian alpine skier
- Inger Brattström (1920–2018), Swedish writer
- Inger Christensen (1935–2009), Danish poet
- Inger Davidson (born 1944), Swedish politician
- Inger Edelfeldt (born 1965), Swedish author
- Inger Frimansson (born 1944), Swedish novelist
- Inger Hagerup (1905–1985), Norwegian author
- Inger Haldorsen (1899–1982), Norwegian physician, midwife and politician
- Inger Helene Nybråten (born 1960), Norwegian cross-country skier
- Inger Koppernæs (1928–1990), Norwegian politician
- Inger Lise Gjørv (1938–2009), Norwegian politician
- Inger Lise Rypdal (born 1949), Norwegian singer and actress
- Inger Løite (born 1958), Norwegian politician
- Inger Lorre (born 1964), American singer
- Inger Louise Valle (1921–2006), Norwegian politician
- Inger Lundberg (1948–2006), Swedish politician
- Inger Margrethe Boberg (1900–1957), Danish folklore researcher
- Inger Miller (born 1972), American sprinter
- Inger Nilsson (born 1959), Swedish actress
- Inger Nordlander (born 1938), Swedish politician
- Inger Pedersen (1936–2023), Norwegian politician
- Inger René (born 1937), Swedish politician
- Inger S. Enger (born 1948), Norwegian politician
- Inger Sandberg, Swedish author of children's books
- Inger Segelström (born 1952), Swedish politician
- Inger Stender (1912–1989), Danish actress
- Inger Stevens (1934–1970), Swedish-American actress
- Inger Støjberg (born 1973), Danish politician
- Inger Thorén (nee Bildt), Swedish engineer and food chemist, in 1938, the first woman assistant appointed at KTH Royal Institute of Technology.

== See also ==
- Inger-Lise Skarstein (born 1937), Norwegian politician
- Inger-Marie Ytterhorn (1941–2021), Norwegian politician
