= Engelhartszell =

- Municipality
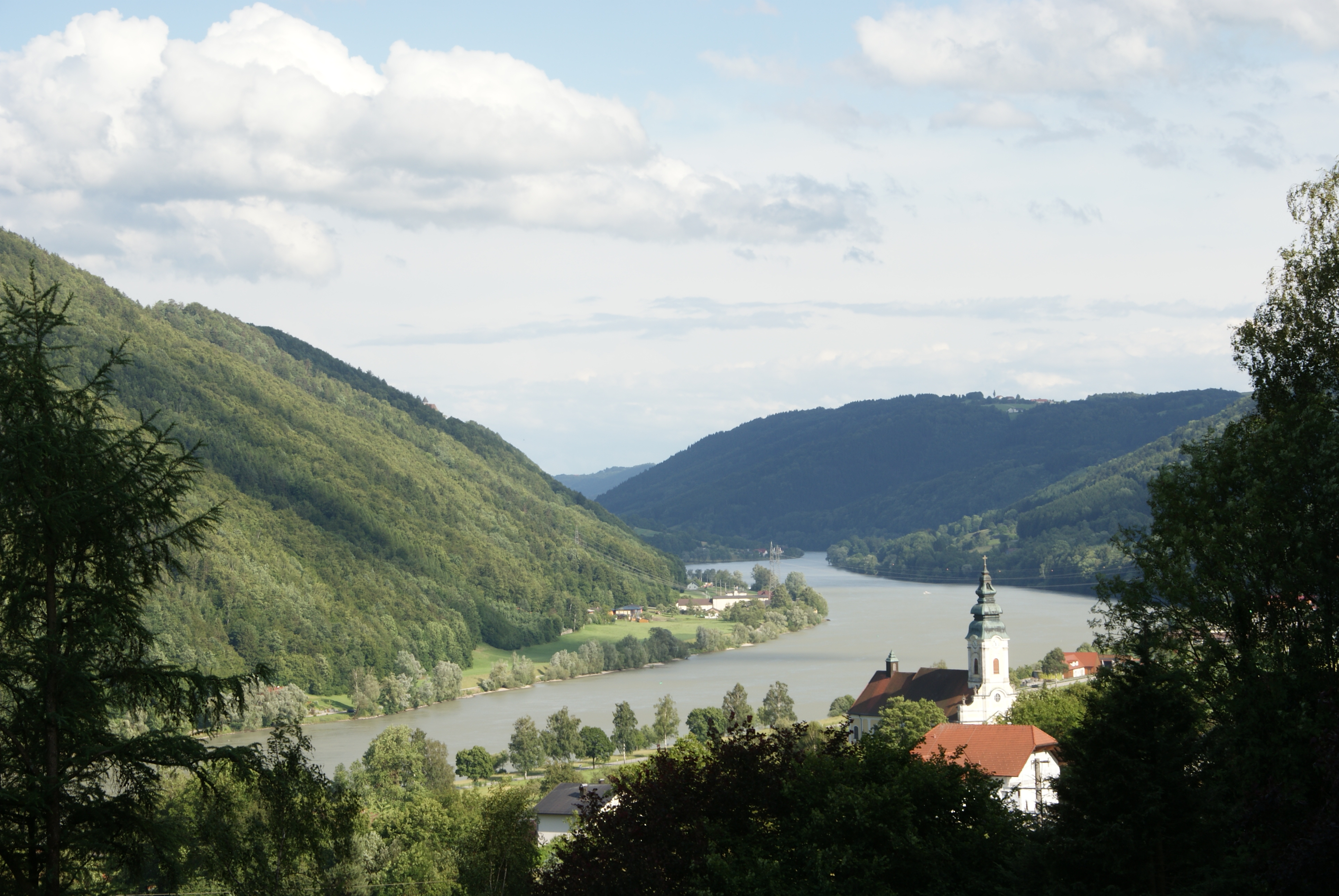

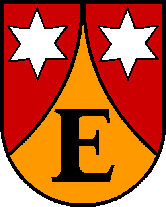
- Coat of arms

- Location within Austria
- Coordinates: 48°30′00″N 13°44′00″E
- Country: Austria
- State: Upper Austria
- District: Schärding

Government
  - Mayor: Roland Pichler (ÖVP)

Area
  - Total: 18.83 km^{2} (7.27 sq mi)
- Elevation: 302 m (991 ft)

Population (2018-01-01)
  - Total: 942
  - Density: 50.0/km^{2} (130/sq mi)
- Time zone: UTC+1 (CET)
  - Summer (DST): UTC+2 (CEST)
- Postal code: 4090
- Area code: 07717
- Vehicle registration: SD
- Website: www.engelhartszell.at

Engelhartszell is a municipality in the district of Schärding in the Austrian state of Upper Austria.

== Geography ==
Engelhartszell lies in the upper Danube valley in the Innviertel. About 57 percent of the municipality is forest, and 28 percent is farmland.

== Notable people ==
- Ingrid Nargang (1929–2019), lawyer and contemporary historian
