= Murder of Ingrid Lyne =

2016 murder in Washington, United States

- Ingrid Lyne in 2016
- Born: Ingrid Maree Rounsaville; August 2, 1975
- Died: April 9, 2016 (aged 40); Renton, Washington, U.S.
- Cause of death: Homicide
- Arrested: John Robert Charlton (April 11, 2016, held in King County Jail)
- Charged: First-degree murder, auto theft (April 13, 2016)

Ingrid Maree (née Rounsaville) Lyne (August 2, 1975 – April 8, 2016) was an American nurse from Renton, Washington, whose dismembered body parts were discovered in the Seattle area on April 10, 2016. On April 11, 2016, John Robert Charlton was arrested and two days later charged with first-degree murder. He pled guilty and was sentenced to 28 years in prison.

== Ingrid Lyne ==
Lyne was a 1993 graduate of Canyon del Oro High School in Tucson, Arizona, and received a Bachelor of Science in Nursing degree in 1997 from the University of Arizona. She moved to Washington in 2000 and lived there for about 13 years. In 2014, she divorced Phillip Lyne. At the time of her death, Lyne was a nurse at Seattle's Swedish Medical Center.

== John Charlton ==
At the time of his arrest, John Charlton was a homeless day laborer. He had a criminal record in six states, including convictions for aggravated robbery, felony theft, grand theft auto, assault, and third-degree larceny.

== Background ==
=== Relationship ===
Lyne and Charlton met through an online dating website and had been dating for approximately one month. They went to a Seattle Mariners baseball game together on the evening of April 8, and Lyne was reported missing the next day.

=== Disappearance and discovery ===
Lyne was last seen by friends on April 8, 2016, and was reported missing on April 9. Later that day, responding to a call from a homeowner, police found several of her dismembered body parts, including a severed head, foot, arm, and leg, in a Seattle recycling bin, approximately 10 miles (16 km) from her home. On April 15, more severed body parts were found by a garbage collector in a different location, though the remains have not yet been identified as a match to Lyne.

On April 9, Lyne's ex-husband arrived at the victim's home to drop off their children. With no one answering the door, he proceeded to call Lyne's mother, who subsequently arrived with a key and searched the residence. Lyne's wallet, purse, and cellphone were found in the home, but Lyne was not. Using the cell phone found in the residence, Lyne's mother sent texts to Charlton and then called the police, who discovered blood, human tissue, and a pruning saw in Lyne's bathroom, as well as trash bags identical to those containing Lyne's severed body parts. Following examination of the body parts, the King County coroner's office stated Lyne's death was a result of "homicidal violence".

On April 18, additional body parts were found at a third Seattle location and await identification.

=== Investigation and arrest ===
As the primary suspect in Lyne's death, Charlton was arrested on April 11, 2016, and charged with first-degree murder and auto theft. Following the arrest, he was held in the King County Jail on $US5 million bail. After his arrest, Charlton claimed he had blacked out on a downtown Seattle sidewalk and woke up with facial injuries and cuts to his body.

=== Plea ===
Appearing in a King County courtroom on October 2, 2017, Charlton pled guilty to all charges against him, including the murder and dismemberment of Lyne.

On January 5, 2018, Charlton was sentenced to 27 years and 9 months in prison, the punishment recommended by prosecutors.

== Reactions ==
A GoFundMe fundraising webpage for Lyne's three daughters raised over $270,000.

Lyne's death led to narratives and discussions about the safety of online dating.

== See also ==
- Murder of Sade Robinson
