= Schärding =

Schärding Scharing
- Municipality
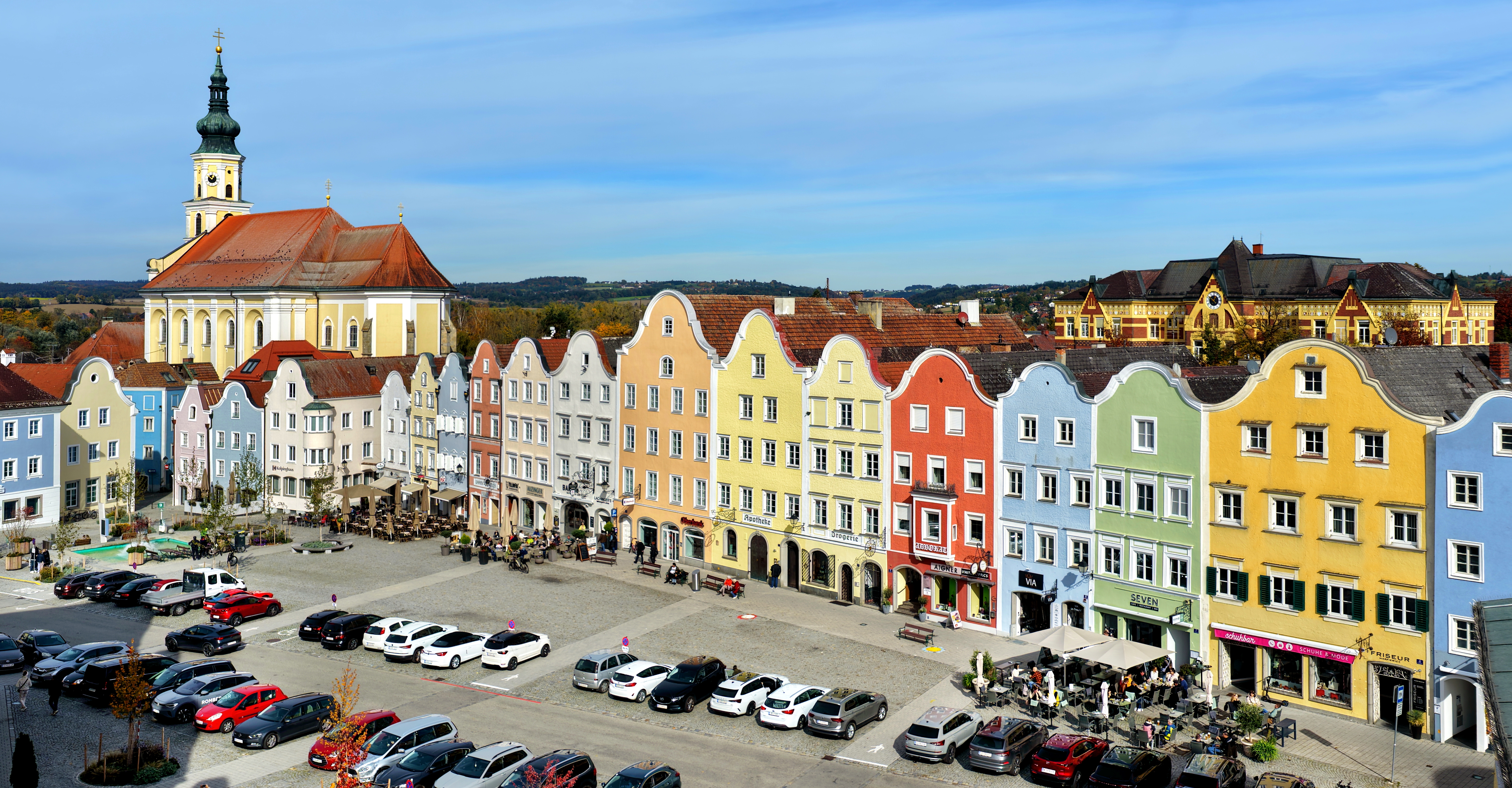
- South view of the Upper Town Square

- Coat of arms

- Location within Austria
- Coordinates: 48°27′25″N 13°25′54″E
- Country: Austria
- State: Upper Austria
- District: Schärding

Government
  - Mayor: Günther Streicher (SPÖ)

Area
  - Total: 4.08 km^{2} (1.58 sq mi)
- Elevation: 313 m (1,027 ft)

Population (2018-01-01)
  - Total: 5,253
  - Density: 1,290/km^{2} (3,330/sq mi)
- Time zone: UTC+1 (CET)
  - Summer (DST): UTC+2 (CEST)
- Postal code: 4780
- Area code: 07712
- Vehicle registration: SD
- Website: www.schaerding.ooe.gv.at

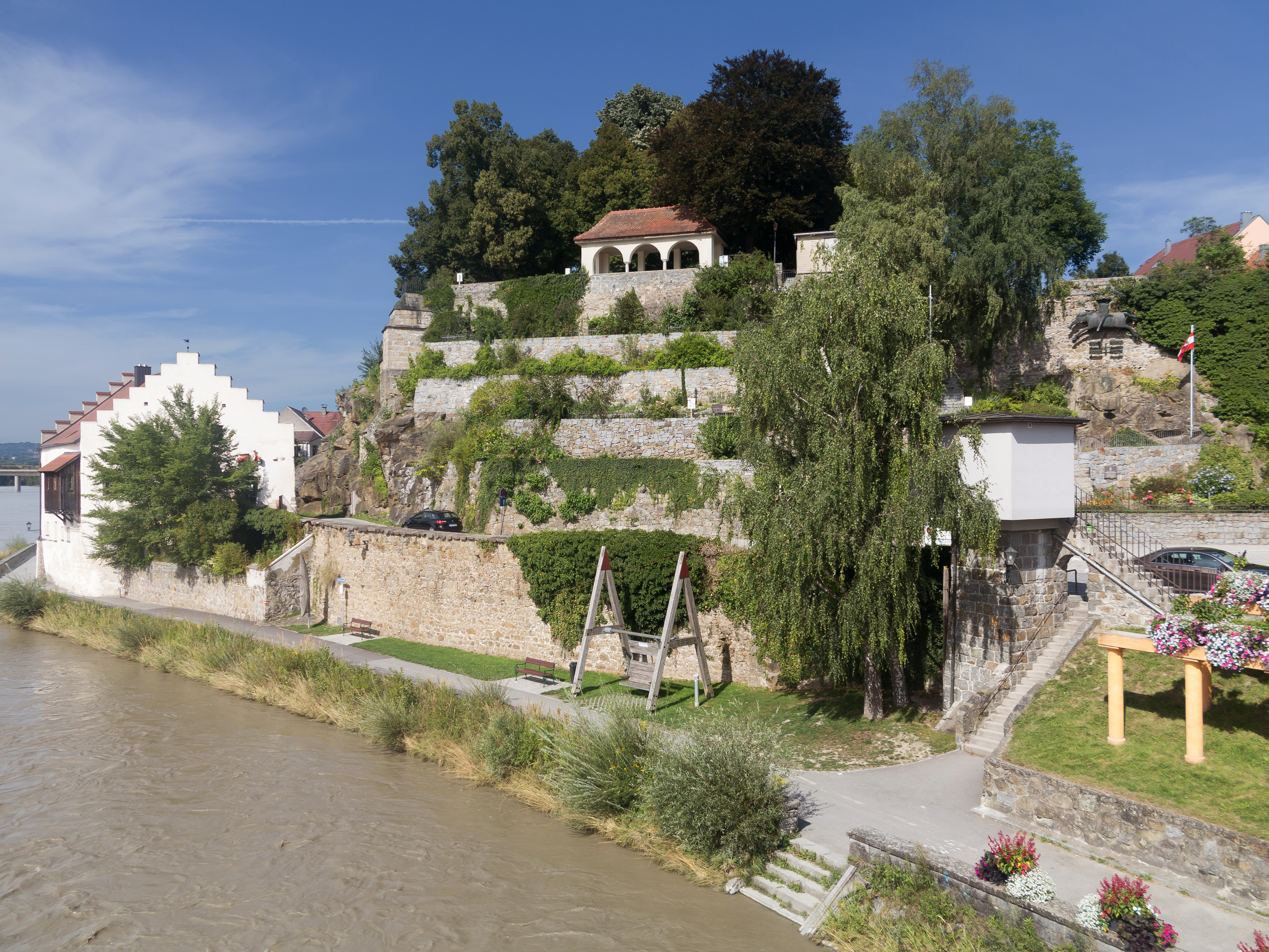
Burggraben-Innlände from the bridge

Schärding (German pronunciation: [ˈʃɛʁdɪŋ] | Bavarian name: Scharing) is a town in the northern Austrian state of Upper Austria, the capital of the district of the same name, and a major port on the Inn River. Historically, it was owned by the Wittelsbach family, which is reflected in the town's architecture.

As of 1 January 2021, it had a population of 5,216.

== History and features ==
The Bavarian Wittelsbach family owned the town until 1779. Eyewitness Travel Austria guide describes Schärding's best feature as its central square, at the north end of which sits the Silberzeile row of gabled-roof houses. Other features include the large Church of St. George. The castle is gone but in its gateway there is a local museum with religious sculptures including those by Johann Peter Schwanthaler.

== Geography ==
The town sits at an altitude of 313 meters and is located in the Innviertel. It measures 4.1 kilometers from north to south, 1.9 km from west to east. The total area is 4.08 km². 2.4 percent of the area is forested, 31.7 percent is used for agriculture.

The Inn River forms the border with the neighboring German state of Bavaria. Directly opposite the town on the Bavarian side of the river is Neuhaus am Inn, which is accessible via two bridges.

== History ==
The area around the current town has been inhabited since the Neolithic period. In 15 B.C., the Romans were advancing to the Danube and the Innviertel, including Schärding, was a part of the Roman province of Noricum and was populated by Celts. Around 488, King Odoacer withdrew his troops to the south. West Germanic Bavarians migrated about 30 years later up the Danube and occupied the area between the Vienna Woods and Lech. Place names ending in -ing, -ham and -heim clearly indicate the change of hands. The name of the district capital Scardinga came from the name given to the settlement by a man named Skardo and his family.

Schärding (Scardinga) was first mentioned in records in 806 as a Passau farmyard. It has been the town center of the county of the Counts of Formbach-Neuburg since the 10th century. The castle rock in the immediate vicinity of the Inn River was utilized early as a favorable geographical location. From 1160 Schärding was ruled by the Counts of Andechs, and from 1248 by the Wittelsbach dynasty.

Benefiting from its location by the Inn, Schärding became a center of trade, particularly for salt, timber, ores, wine, silk, glass, grain, textiles and livestock. The town was granted market rights at the end of the 13th century. After many changes of ownership in the 14th century, for example on 20 January 1316 (to the Wittelsbachs), on September 24, 1364 it went to Rudolf IV of the House of Habsburg. 1369 ended the peace of Schärding (the dispute between Austria and Bavaria for control of the Tyrol, which fell to the Habsburgs who pawned the town back to Bavaria.)

From 1429 to 1436 the fortifications of the city were built by Duke Ludwig the Gebarteten. Among others, the outer castle gate, the moat, Linz and Passau Gate and the Water Gate were built during this time. During the Thirty Years' War, especially in the years 1628, 1634, 1645, 1647 and 1651, the plague raged in the city.

During the War of the Austrian Succession, a Bavarian army was defeated near the town on 17 January, 1742, during a winter offensive led by the Austrian field marshal von Khevenhüller.

In April 1939, when Mayor Hans Ominger, Kreisamtsleiter Johann Pachman and other National Socialists hosted a hunters' meeting at the Aschenbrenner Inn, a portrait of Hermann Göring was decorated with fresh greens. The men celebrated the incorporation of the neighboring German-inhabited Sudetenland of Czechoslovakia into German hunting grounds.

== Population ==
=== Municipal structure ===
The municipality comprises the following five localities (in parentheses population status as of October 31, 2011).

- Allerheiligen (870)
- Brunnwies (199)
- Kreuzberg (236)
- Schärding Innere Stadt (567)
- Schärding Vorstadt (3004)

=== Population ===
Historical population

Year	Pop.	±%
1869	3,198	—
1880	3,585	+12.1%
1890	3,716	+3.7%
1900	3,762	+1.2%
1910	3,958	+5.2%
1923	4,011	+1.3%

Year	Pop.	±%
1934	4,236	+5.6%
1939	4,560	+7.6%
1951	5,864	+28.6%
1961	5,710	−2.6%
1971	5,891	+3.2%
1981	5,741	−2.5%

Year	Pop.	±%
1991	5,446	−5.1%
2001	5,052	−7.2%
2011	4,955	−1.9%
2015	4,916	−0.8%
2021	5,216	+6.1%

=== Religion ===
The residents are predominantly Roman Catholic, at 83.5 percent of the entire town population. The second largest religious community is Islam with 5.0 percent of the population. Lutherans make up 2.8 percent, whereas; 5.6 percent have no religious affiliation.

=== Traffic ===
- Road: Schärding is located near the Innkreis motorway A8, which connects Wels and Passau and (as the German Bundesautobahn 3) Regensburg. The federal road network connects to the German road network via two bridges over the Inn.
- Rail: Schärding is located on the branch of the Westbahn railway line leading to Passau Hauptbahnhof and is therefore connected to the greater Linz area and eastern Austria as well as to Germany and the whole of Western Europe. Schärding railway station is the starting point of the line to Ried im Innkreis and on to Attnang-Puchheim (Salzkammergutbahn) or Braunau am Inn, continuing in Germany via Mühldorf to Munich (Innkreis Railway from Ried).
- Shipping: Shipping on the Inn is now only of tourist importance, as the Inn power plants are not equipped with navigable locks.

== In popular culture ==
The asteroid 178243 Schaerding was named in the town's honour by its discoverer, Richard Gierlinger, who calls Schärding his hometown.

== Notable people ==
- Ingrid Nargang (1929–2019), judge and contemporary historian
- Marlene Morreis (1976–), actress
- Oliver Glasner (1974-), football manager

== Gallery ==
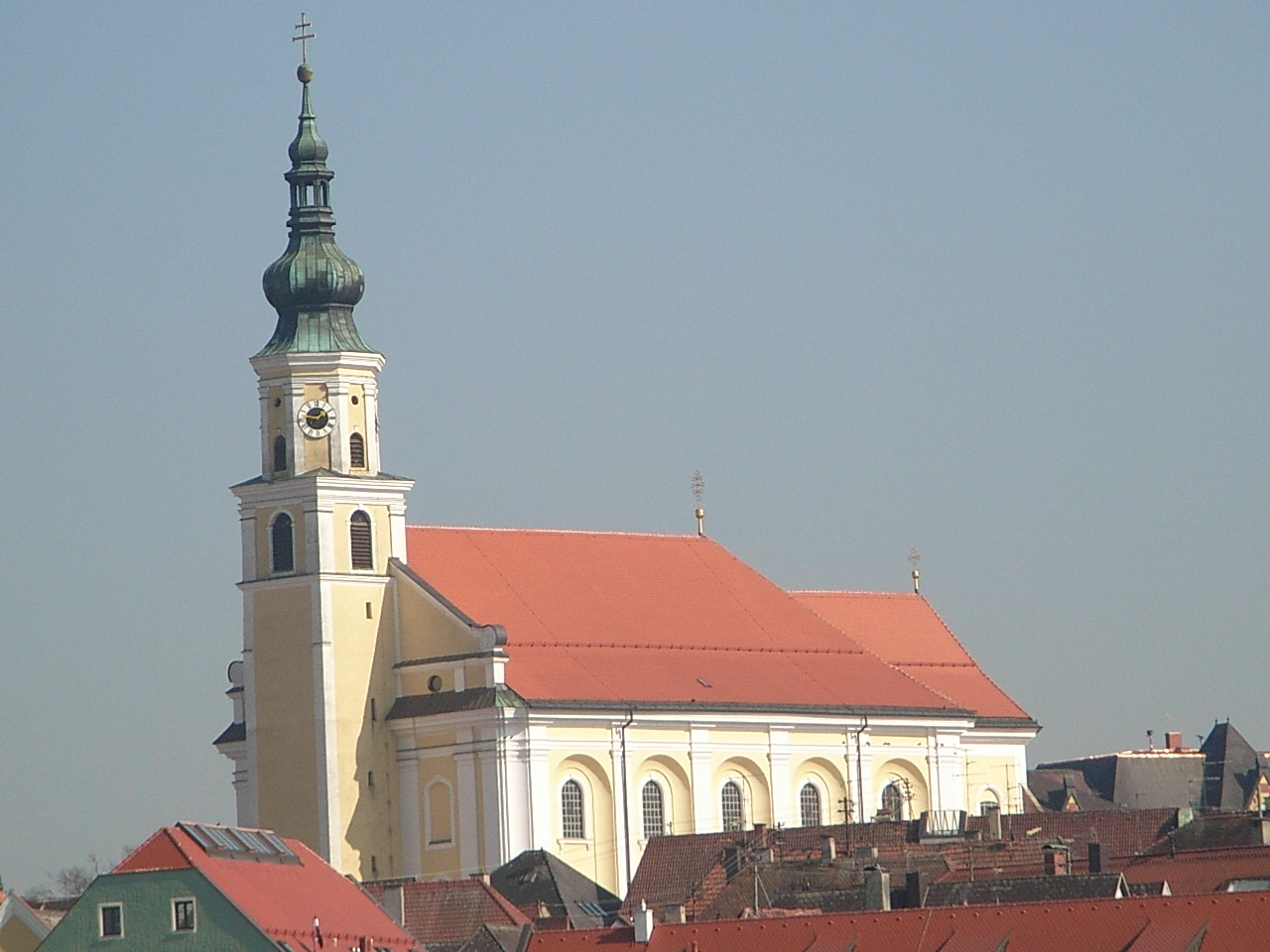
Saint George's church

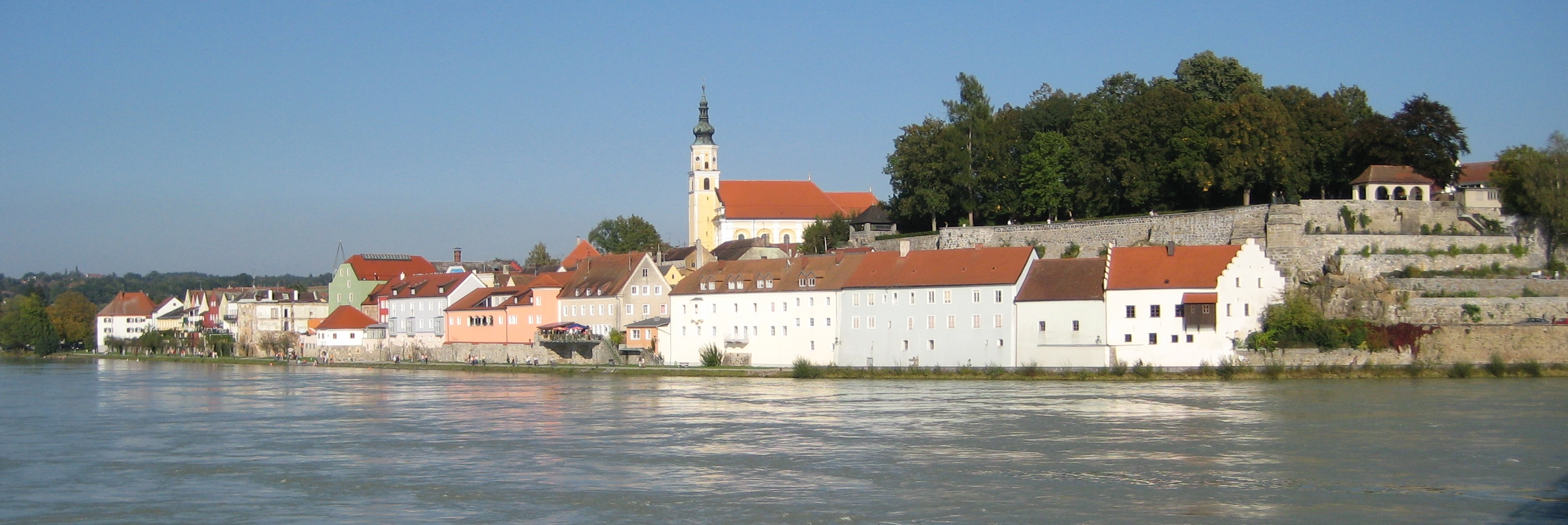
Schärding at the Inn River
