= Ingrid Nargang =

Austrian lawyer, judge, and contemporary historian (1929–2019)

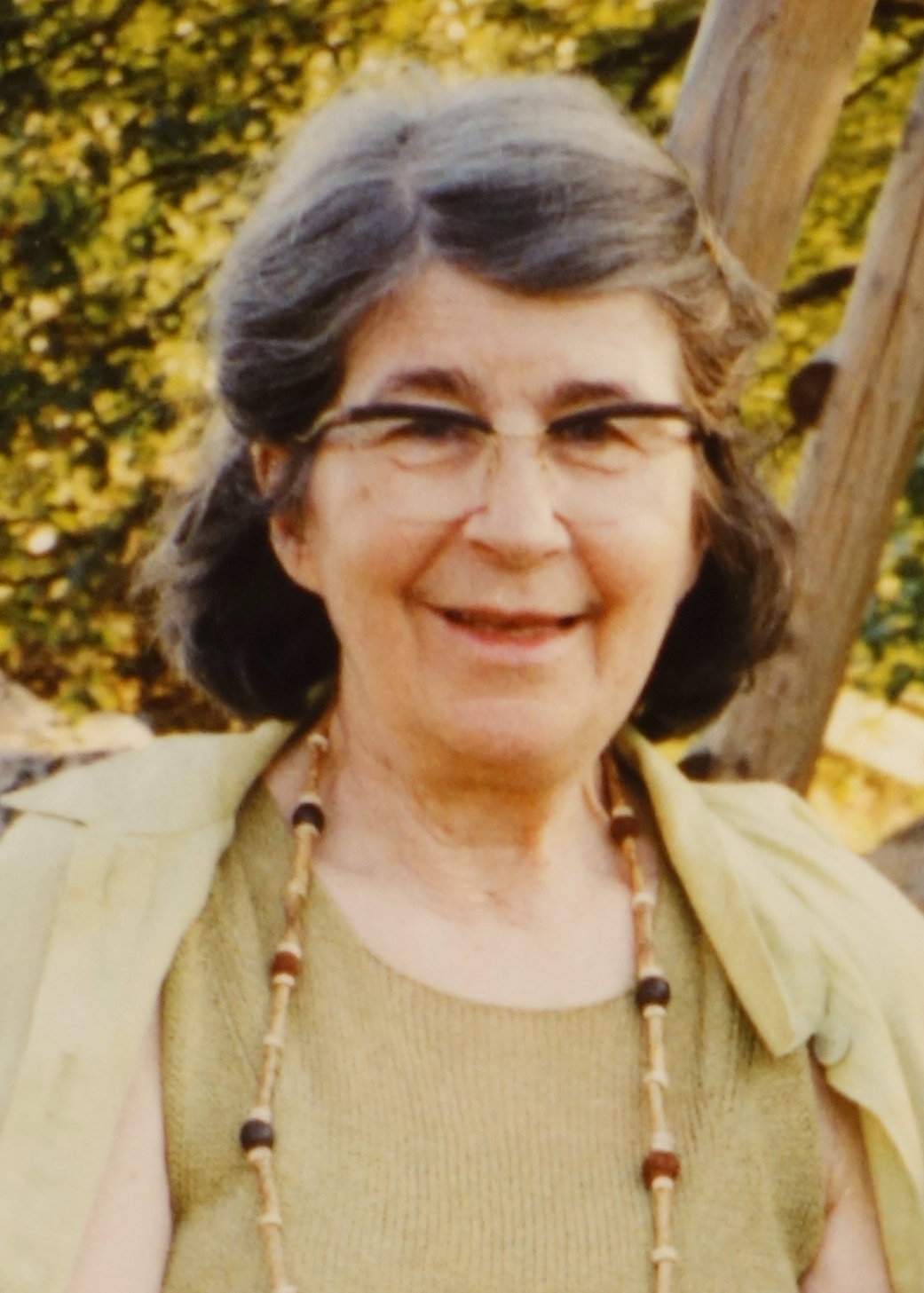
Ingrid Nargang, 1998

Ingrid Nargang (17 April 1929 – 10 May 2019) was an Austrian lawyer, judge, and contemporary historian. From 1964 to 1993, she was head of the district court in Engelhartszell. She was the first woman to head a rural district court in the Judiciary of Austria.

== Biography ==
Alice Ingrid Annemarie Nargang was born in Chernivtsi, Romania on 17 April 1929. She came from an old Austrian family of civil servants. Her great-grandfather was the classical philologist and high school director, Stefan Wolf; a grandfather was a lawyer. The family lived in Czernowitz in Bukovina, which until the end of World War I belonged to the Austrian monarchy as its own crown land, then fell to the Kingdom of Romania and is currently partly in Ukraine (including Chernivtsi). She was raised by her mother and grandmother. The father left the family when she was two years old. In the summer of 1940, when Nargang was eleven years old, the Soviet Union entered into northern Bukovina as a result of the Molotov–Ribbentrop Pact and agreed with the German Reich to resettle the population of German origin. With mother and grandmother, Nargang first moved to Lower Silesia, then to Upper Silesia. When the Russians approached towards the end of World War II, they fled to Upper Austria.

As so-called "expellees"" and "ethnic Germans" living in Oberweis near Gmunden, Nargang attended the secondary school in Gmunden from autumn 1945. After graduating in 1948, she studied jurisprudence in Innsbruck. She also attended a graduate course at the commercial academy. In 1952, she received her doctorate in law. After a year-long judicial clerkship, she studied economics until 1955. In 1959, she completed a doctorate in social and economic sciences. During this time, Nargang had already started working as an apprentice lawyer in Linz and passed the bar exam. Subsequently, she worked as a lawyer at the Linz Magistrate.

In 1963, she became a judge. From 1964 until her retirement in 1993, Nargang headed the district court of Engelhartszell. She was the first woman to head a rural Austrian district court .

As a contemporary historian, Nargang researched the history of the Bukovina Germans and the situation of the refugees in Upper Austria after the Second World War. She was also a founding member of the regional team of the Bukovina Germans in Linz .

In her later years, Nargang lived in Engelhartszell, Linz, and Vienna. She died in Schärding on 10 May 2019.
