= Bardengesang auf Gibraltar: O Calpe! Dir donnert's am Fuße =

1782 fragment of an art song by W. A. Mozart

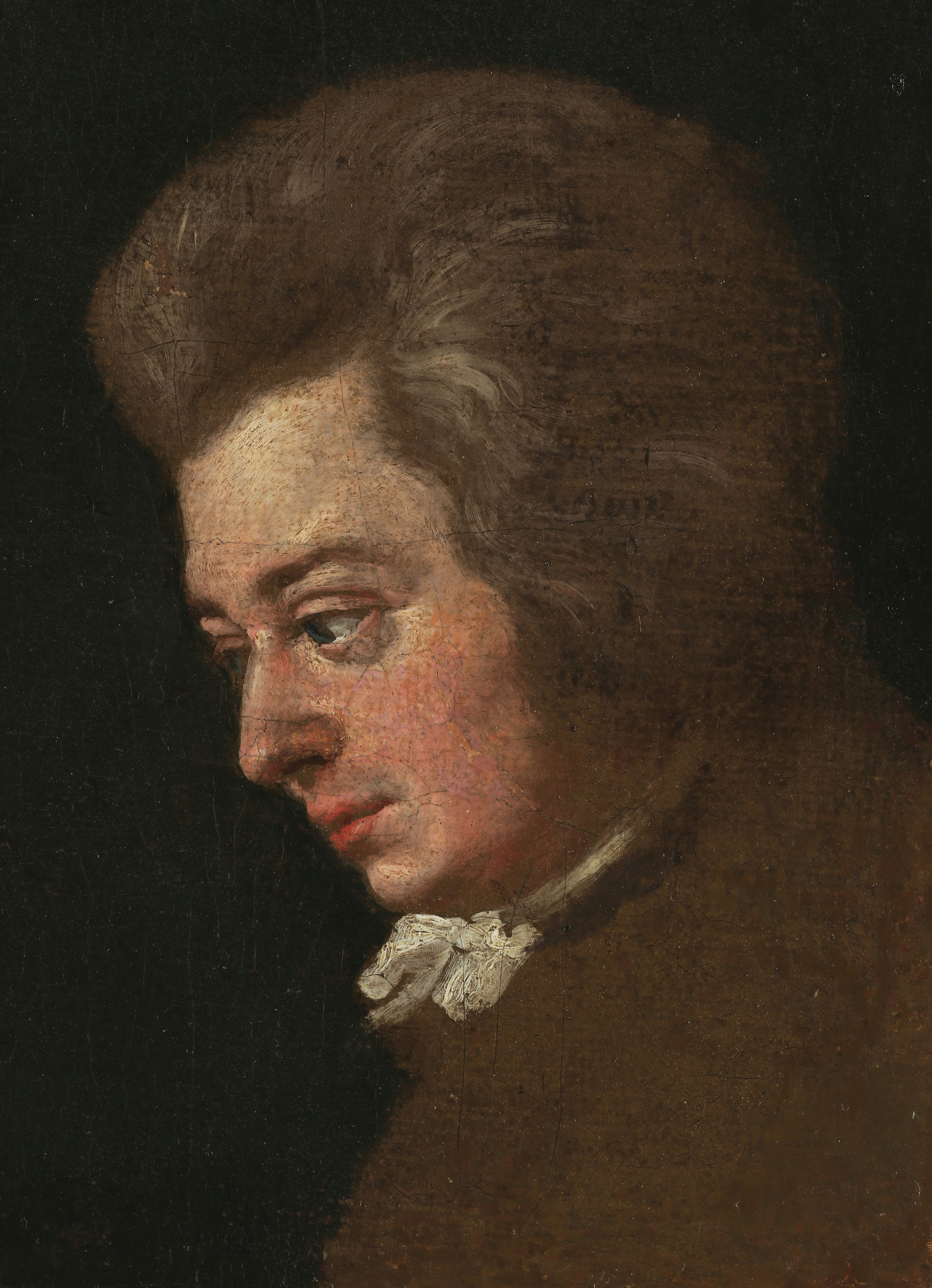
Detail of Joseph Lange's 1782–83 Mozart portrait

Bardengesang auf Gibraltar: O Calpe! Dir donnert's am Fuße (K. Anh. 25 / 386d) is an fragment of an art song for voice and piano composed by Wolfgang Amadeus Mozart in 1782. It was created to celebrate the British Royal Navy's successful relief of the besieged garrison of Gibraltar in October 1782 during the Great Siege of Gibraltar. A British fleet had evaded a joint Franco-Spanish force to deliver supplies and reinforcements to the garrison before returning home safely – an achievement that was widely lauded and soon forced France and Spain to give up the siege. Mozart's reaction to the British victory was to declare to his father that he considered himself an "arch-Englishman". This was an unusually political outburst from someone who was ordinarily very apolitical, perhaps reflecting antipathy towards the French. He was commissioned to set to music a "bardic song" (Bardengesang) by Michael Denis celebrating the British success but gave up after only completing three stanzas. In a letter to his father sent at the end of December 1782, he complained of the poet's "exaggerated and bombastic" style.

== History ==
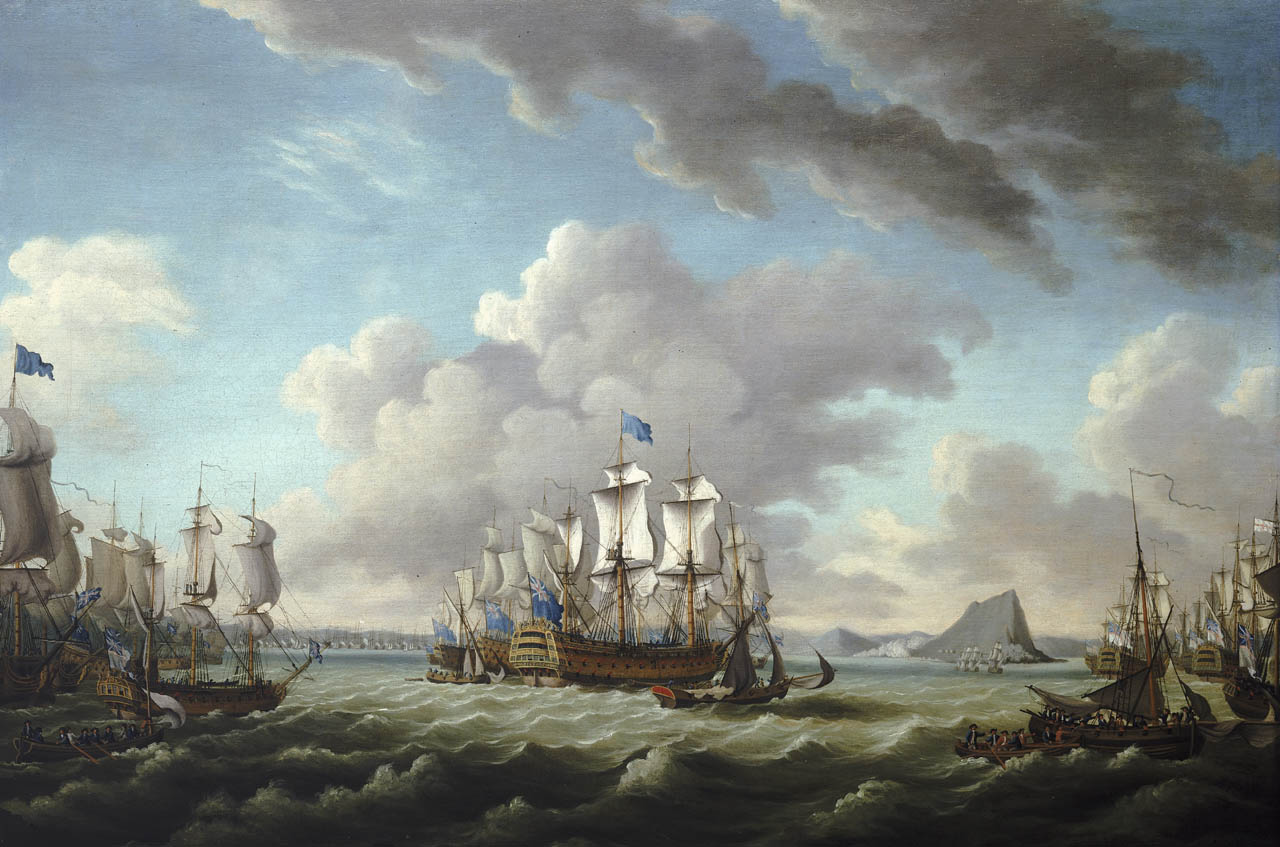
Relief of Gibraltar by Earl Howe, 11 October 1782, by Richard Paton (1783)

The Great Siege of Gibraltar was an unsuccessful attempt by Spain and France to capture the territory from the British during the American War of Independence. It began in June 1779 and was still ongoing at the time that Mozart wrote the piece; it did not end until February 1783. In September 1782, a large British fleet comprising 31 transport ships and 34 ships of the line brought vital supplies, food and ammunition as well as three regiments to Gibraltar to resupply and strengthen the garrison. It was opposed by a Franco-Spanish fleet but reached Gibraltar unopposed due to a storm which dispersed the French and Spanish ships. The fleet's commander, Admiral Richard Howe, then fought the inconclusive Battle of Cape Spartel before returning to Britain. The success of the relief operation put an end to the besiegers' hopes of overcoming the British defenders, and the following January a peace agreement was reached to end the fighting.

When news of the British success reached Vienna, Mozart expressed joy in a letter to Leopold, his father. Leopold asked Mozart whether he had heard about it, to which the latter replied in a letter of 19 October 1782: "Yes, indeed, I have heard the news of England's victories — and with great joy, for you know I am a arch-Englishman [ein Erzengländer]." This was unusual in itself. Mozart's many letters contain few indications of his political leanings and little sign of any interest in politics in general, so it was most uncommon for him to express himself in such a way. Austria was not involved in the war, nor did he have any personal connections with it or with Gibraltar. The American musicologist Neal Zaslaw suggests that "the Catholic Mozart's pleasure at the defeat of two Catholic countries at the hands of a Protestant country can only be explained by England's position as the most Enlightened country in Europe." Derek Beales of the University of Cambridge rejects this, suggesting that Mozart "just liked to follow the fortunes of war, that he had become strongly anti-French during his visit to Paris in 1778 and that he was fascinated by the siege."

Around the same time, the Austrian poet Michael Denis wrote a heroic ode to commemorate the success of the British action. Denis's poem was written in the so-called "sublime style", which Hugh Blair had criticised some years earlier as merely an assemblage of "magnificent words, accumulated epithets, and a certain swelling form of expression" that tended to obscure the relative emptiness of the thoughts thus expressed. Denis considered himself a heroic bard, even styling himself "Sined the Bard" ("Sined" being "Denis" backwards) in the mode of Ossian, which he had translated into German. He composed what Elaine R. Sisman describes as "an extended apostrophe to Gibraltar and the British admiral Howe who saved it from blockade; the poem contains in its eleven stanzas fully thirty-five exclamation points."

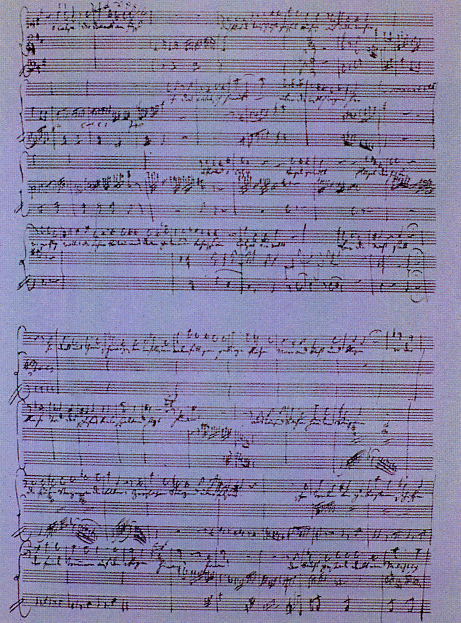
Manuscript of the fragment

A Hungarian woman living in Vienna commissioned Mozart to set Denis's poem to music, apparently intending to pay a surprise tribute to the poet. Mozart explained what he was trying to do in another letter to his father, but complained of the artistically unsatisfactory nature of his source material:

I am engaged in a very difficult task, the music for a bard's song by Denis about Gibraltar. But this is a secret, for it is a Hungarian lady who wishes to pay this compliment to Denis. The ode is sublime, beautiful, anything you like – only – too exaggerated and bombastic for my fastidious ears. But do what you want! The mean, the genuine in all things is known and valued no longer; to receive approval, one must write something so easy to understand that a coachman can sing it right to you, or so incomprehensible that it pleases precisely because no rational person can understand it.

Mozart set the first three stanzas but then gave up at the end of the first line of the fourth stanza. The short section of the ode tackled by Mozart is addressed to Gibraltar itself, called by the ancient name of 'Calpe'. It first sets the scene with the "wings of assistance" of the British fleet approaching the peninsula. A storm approaches and sweeps over the sea and coast, driving enemy (French and Spanish) ships onto the rocks. The rise of the storm in the first stanza is represented by tremolos and turning figures, with oscillating neighbour-notes used to depict the fluttering flags and sails of the British fleet. The second triad utilises a repeating broken D minor triad, followed by rising and falling scales in the third stanza to represent the breaking waves and the ships being swept onto the rocks.

Sisman suggests that Mozart realised that the piece was going nowhere after the initial "forced heroics" and comments that the composer had fallen into the trap of invoking the "stilted and overwrought" "sublime style", rather than truly invoking the awe and terror of the sublime. It was perhaps this realisation that prompted him to abandon the piece as a hopeless effort. Alternatively, Sisman suggests (perhaps a little tongue-in-cheek), "it might have been the prospect of the threefold 'Hinan!' ['Onward!'] at the end of the fourth stanza that finally made Mozart throw up his hands."

== Lyrics ==
O Calpe! Dir donnert's am Fuße,
Doch blickt dein tausendjähriger Gipfel
Ruhig auf Welten umher.
Siehe! Dort wölket sich hinauf,
Über die westlichen Wogen her,
Wölket sich breiter und ahnender auf.
Es flattert, o Calpe! Segelgewölk!
Flügel der Hilfe!
Wie prächtig wallet die Fahne Britanniens,
Deiner getreuen Verheißerin!
Calpe! Sie wallt! Aber die Nacht sinkt!

Sie deckt mit ihren schwarzesten,
Unholdsten Rabenfittichen Gebirge,
Flächen, Meer und Bucht und Klippen,
Wo der bleiche Tod des Schiffers,
Kiele spaltend, sitzt.
Hinan!

Aus tausend Rachen heulen Stürme.
Die Fluten steigen an die Wolken,
Zerplatzen stürzend über Felsen.
Schon treiben von geborst'nen Schiffen
Der Feinde Trümmer auf den Wogen.
Hinan! Hinan!

Der Bucht Gestade deckt ein mächtig ...

O Calpe! At your feet it thunders
Yet your thousand year old summit looks
Calmly around at the world.
See! There it becomes cloudy
Over the western waves hither,
Clouds up more widely and portentously. –
Something flutters, o Calpe! Clouds of sails!
Wings of help! How splendidly
Waves the flag of Britain,
Your faithful protector!
Calpe! It is waving! – But the night falls!

It conceals with its blackest,
most inhospitable raven-feathers,
mountains, surfaces, sea and cove,
and cliffs, where pale Death
Splitting the ship's keel, sits.
Onward!

Out of a thousand throats howl the storms.
The torrents rise to the clouds
Burst tumbling over rocks.
Already from the shattered ships
The enemy's wreckage drifts on to the waves
Onward! Onward!

The cove's banks shelter a mighty ...
