= Ingrīda Kadaka =

Latvian painter (born 1967)

- Born: 1967; Riga, Latvia

Ingrīda Kadaka (born 29 July 1967, in Riga, Latvia) is an artist and book designer and illustrator, best known for her work in the media of oil painting and etching. She matriculated at the Art Academy of Latvia (1989), from which she received her BA (1993) and MA (1995). She has been a member of the Artists' Union of Latvia since 1997, and has exhibited frequently in solo and group shows in her native country; she was awarded grants by the State Culture Capital Foundation of Latvia in 2003 and 2005. Her work is noteworthy for its exploitation of folklore motifs, brilliant color, simple and striking forms, and humor; in these respects, a comparison with the art of Marc Chagall would strike some viewers as apropos.
