= Ingrid Miethe =

Social scientist (b. 1962)

Ingrid Miethe (born 1962 in Plauen) is a German professor of education at the University of Giessen. Her areas of focus include biographical research, the history of education, and connections between education and social inequality. Her book is Biografiearbeit: Lehr- und Handbuch für Studium und Praxis (2011) and she coauthored Globalisation of an Educational Idea: Workers’ Faculties in Eastern Germany, Vietnam, Cuba and Mozambique (2018). She instigated the founding of an ethics committee within the German Educational Research Association (DGfE) and has been the chair of this committee since.

== Early career and education ==
After initial studies at Greifswald Medical School from 1978 to 1981, Miethe worked as an orthoptist at the ophthalmic clinic in Plauen. From 1985 on she was active in the independent peace movement of East Germany, and was the object of a Stasi operation. In autumn of 1989 she was active in the New Forum and initiated the Working Group on Education in Berlin. Because of her political activities, she was not admitted to university in the GDR and worked in various other occupations. Her academic career began after the fall of the Berlin Wall.

From 1990 to 1995 Miethe studied Education Sciences at Technische Universität Berlin, followed by a postgraduate course in Qualitative Research Methodology at the Free University of Berlin (FU Berlin). After obtaining a doctorate in Political Science at FU Berlin in 1999, she worked as a research associate in the Department of Education at the University of Greifswald. From 2002 to 2010 she was Professor of General Education at the Protestant university, Evangelische Hochschule, in Darmstadt. In 2007, Miethe received her Habilitation in education at the University of Halle-Wittenberg.

== Career ==
In 2009 Miethe was appointed to her present post as Professor of General Education at the University of Giessen, where she was also Dean of the Department of Social Sciences and Cultural Studies. In January 2021 it emerged that under Miethe's chairmanship the department's financial budget had been overspent by more than 1 million euro, leading to widespread job cuts. In response to sustained criticism of her leadership by the Faculty Council, Ingrid Miethe had to resign as dean on march 7th 2022.

=== Research ===
Miethe has conducted research on the East German women's peace movement and the women's movement in that country and Eastern Europe as a whole. She has published studies on differences between the East and West German women's movements and the influence of the European unification process.

She dealt early on with issues of research ethics and instigated the founding of an ethics committee within the German Educational Research Association (DGfE). She has been the chair of this committee since its founding.

As a cofounder of the Network on Reconstructive Social Work, Miethe has contributed to the development of reconstructive research in social work. Since 2008 she has been coeditor of the series Reconstructive Research in Social Work. She is coeditor of a manual on qualitative methods in social work. She has also written on the transfer of qualitative methods in the practice of social work. Her book Biografiearbeit: Lehr- und Handbuch für Studium und Praxis ["Biographical work: textbook and manual for study and practice"] has become a standard work in this area.

Her research also focuses on the history of education, especially in the GDR. She is the author of a study on the Workers' and Peasants' Faculties (Arbeiter- und Bauern-Fakultäten, ABF) in East Germany, institutions to prepare young workers and peasants for higher education. A central finding of this research was that the concept of these institutions was transferred to many socialist countries. A study on workers' schools in Cuba, Vietnam, and Mozambique compares these international transfers, contributing to the study of educational cooperation of the socialist countries with countries of the global south.

Miethe has also focused on the relationship between education and social inequality, both in international comparison – as in the study of the workers' faculties – and in independent studies. She studied the issue both as part of the project ArbeiterKind.de and in an intergenerational and east–west comparison. Most recently, she has critically questioned the widespread thesis of the "foreignness of educational newcomers," finding that the habitual differences perceived by educational climbers are not necessarily problematic. Hence she favors an open research perspective examining both "fits" and "non-fits."

== Membership in scientific organizations ==
Miethe is a member of numerous academic associations. She was cofounder and editor of the feminist political science journal Femina Politica (1997-2000) and a board member of the Interdisciplinary Center for Women's and Gender Studies at the University of Greifswald (2000–02). She has also served on the executive committee of the German Association of Social Work (DGSA; 2008–11).

Since 2014 she has been an executive board member, and since 2018 vice president, of the German Educational Research Association (DGfE). She is also a liaison lecturer of the Hans Böckler Foundation and serves as a witness for the Federal Foundation for the Reappraisal of the SED Dictatorship.

== Publications ==
A full list of Miethe's publications can be found on the website of her department at the University of Giessen.
