= Ingrid Vanderveldt =

American businesswoman, media personality, and investor

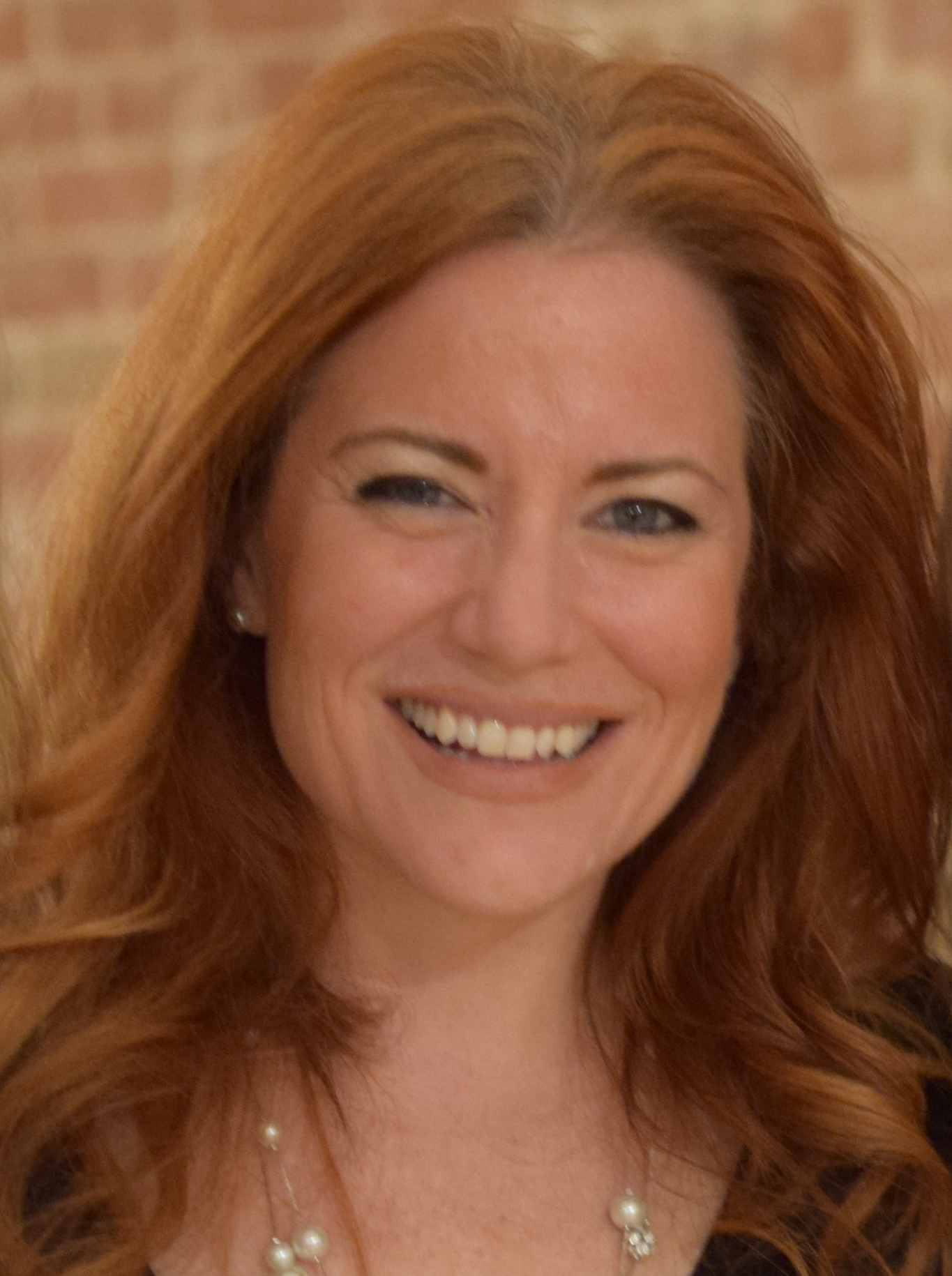
- Vanderveldt in 2014
- Born: November 7, 1970; Bethesda, Maryland, U.S.
- Education: Savannah College of Art and Design

Ingrid Vanderveldt (born November 7, 1970) is an American businesswoman, media personality, and investor.

== Early life and education ==
Vanderveldt was born in 1970 in Bethesda, Maryland and is one of four children of Dr. Hendrikus Hermanus Johannes Vanderveldt and Joan Vanderveldt. She earned her Masters in Architecture at The Savannah College of Art & Design in 1993 and a Master of Business Administration from The University of Texas at Austin in 1996.

== Career ==
Vanderveldt created and hosted CNBC’s first original primetime series, “American Made.” Vanderveldt is the 2018 Recipient of the Global Empowerment Award by the Global Business and Interfaith Peace Awards in partnership with the UN, has been named by Oprah as one of her Global 100 Leaders, and is the winner of the Global Entrepreneur in Excellence Award given jointly by Forbes and Northwestern Mutual.

In 2011, Vanderveldt was hired as Dell's first Entrepreneur in Residence leading programs such as, The Dell Center for Entrepreneurs, The Dell Founders Club, and The $100M Dell Innovators Credit Fund. As the Entrepreneur in Residence, she travels to over 80 cities each year to speak at conferences and panels to promote the global and domestic entrepreneurial initiatives at Dell.

Vanderveldt was among ten people who joined the United Nations Foundation 2013-2014 Global Entrepreneur Council. The UN Global Entrepreneur Council features entrepreneurs under the age of 45, spanning the corporate, creative, and media industries.

In 2012, Vanderveldt helped architect the first federal and State based Entrepreneur in Residence Bill in Washington D.C., aimed to simplify small business regulatory hurdles to help business owners start and grow their companies.

In 2013, Vanderveldt testified to pass the Entrepreneur-In-Residence bill SB 328 at the Texas Senate Government Organization Committee at the State Capitol in Austin, Texas.

Vanderveldt’s life goal and mission is to “Empower a Billion Women by 2020." She gave a TedXWomen talk in 2011 on "Making the Impossible Possible," speaking about her mission and upbringing.

She was the first Entrepreneur-in-Residence for Dell and is the founder and current CEO of the Empowering a Billion Women by 2020 movement. Vanderveldt was the creator and manager of the Dell $100 million credit fund, and a member of the 2013 United Nations' Global Entrepreneurship Council.

== Awards and honors ==
- 2013 40 Women to Watch Over 40
- 2013 Small Business Influencer Awards Honorable Mention
- 2001 Austin — 40 Under 40 Award for Technology
- Austin American Statesman's named Vanderveldt one of "The Top 10 Tech Town's Rising Stars to Watch"
- Founded CNBC's first reality TV show, "American Made"
- 2012 Alumni of the year — The Savannah College of Art & Design
- 2011 TEDxFiDiWomen Talk on "Making the Impossible Possible"
- Vanderveldt has spoken at The UN Foundation Social Good Summit, Clinton Global Initiative, and SXSW

== Personal life ==
On September 22, 2009, Vanderveldt married former professional skydiver and current Executive Director of Ingrid Vanderveldt LLC Glenn Hodgson.
