= Inkeri (name) =

Inkeri is a Finnish female given name and a surname. It is the Finnish equivalent of the given name Ingegerd. Notable people with the name are as follows:

== Given name ==
- Inkeri Anttila (1916–2013), Finnish jurist, criminologist and politician
- Inkeri Lehtinen (1908–1997), Finnish politician
- Inkeri Virtanen (1921–1962), Finnish trade union official, political organizer and politician

== Surname ==
- Eija Inkeri (1926–2012), Finnish actress
