= Allison Hrabluik =

Canadian artist

Allison Hrabluik is a visual artist based in Vancouver, British Columbia, Canada. Her practice primarily involves video, experimental film and animation. Her practice is informed by literature, narrative, and storytelling and she often utilizes traditional mediums such as collage, sculpture, and print media.

== Biography ==
Hrabluik graduated from Alberta College of Art and Design, where she received an Alumni Honour Award in 2015. Hrabluik is Sessional Faculty at Emily Carr University of Art and Design in Vancouver. In 2014, she was long listed for that year's Sobey Award.

Hrabluik has participated in both solo and group exhibitions, including How Soon Is Now (2009) at the Vancouver Art Gallery; her film Rossendale (2006) was screened in the Diaz Contemporary Gallery in Toronto, Canada. Her most recent film, The Splits (2015), was exhibited in Ambivalent Pleasures at the Vancouver Art Gallery in 2016 and 2017 and at the Simon Fraser University Gallery in Burnaby, British Columbia in 2016.
