= Ingrid Bachmann =

Canadian contemporary artist

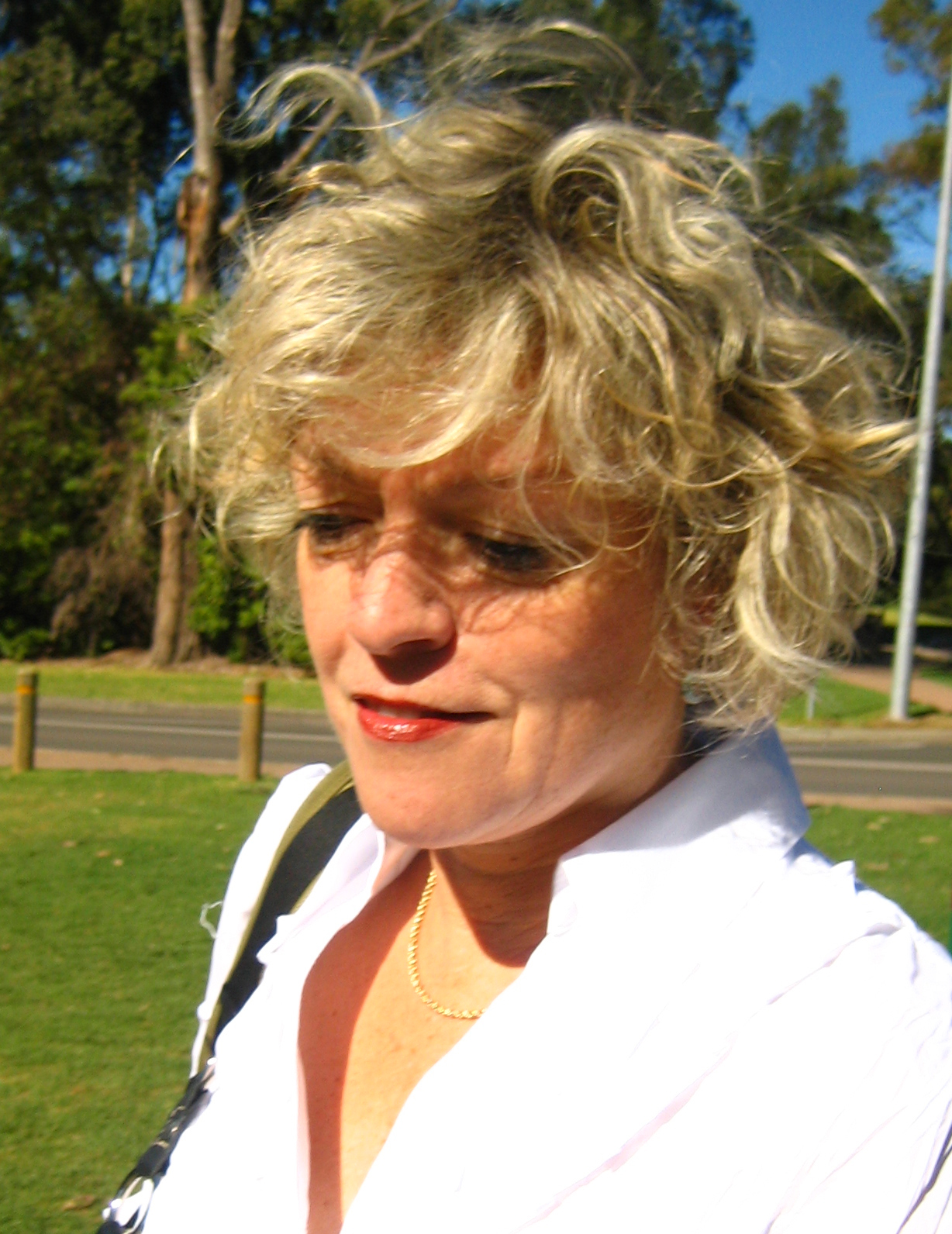
- Born: 1958 (age 67–68); London, Ontario, Canada
- Known for: multidisciplinary installation works, drawing from the fields of textiles, sculpture and kinetic art

Ingrid Bachmann (born 1958) is a Canadian contemporary artist based in Montreal known mostly for her interactive kinetic sculptures that mix technology and ordinary everyday objects. Her work has been exhibited throughout Canada, and internationally in the United States, Peru, Brazil, Germany, Belgium, Scotland, Australia and Cuba. Exhibitions include the 11th Havana Biennial (Cuba), the Quebec Biennial, Manifestation d’art International 6 (Canada), Flesh of the World (Canada), Command Z: Artists Working with Phenomena and Technology (USA), and Lab 30 (Germany).

== About ==
Ingrid Bachmann is known for her multidisciplinary installation works, drawing from the fields of textiles, sculpture and kinetic art. Her work frequently incorporates technology. But as J.R. Carpenter points out: "Much of Bachmann’s work with technology has been aimed at demystifying it, humanizing it, stripping it down to its essentials, and then hanging stories on those bare bones. She has used bits of yarn to map the internet’s under-sea cables, harnessed the computer loom to 'print' seismic activity, offered giant knitting needles as a user-computer interface."

In an article in Canadian Art Magazine, Terence Sharpe writes: "Ingrid Bachmann’s work can be read as a mapping of social and technological evolutions. It attempts to harness the alienation of new media and return it to more corporeal base."

Bachmann's artist biography for the Sydney, Australia exhibition (2016) "The Patient" describes her work as existing "at the crossroads of the technological, the generative, the performative and the corporeal."

== Selected works ==
Symphony for 54 Shoes (Distant Echoes) "is a kinetic artwork that involves 27 pairs of shoes collected from a variety of second hand and thrift stores. Each shoe has a toe and heel tap used in tap dancing attached to it. The shoes move or dance independently of each other. The mechanical motion of tapping is created using solenoids (tubular magnetic sensors) that move up and down when activated by a switch. Each switch, 52 in total, is controlled by a microcontroller and software that activates the sequence of the tapping of the shoes."

Pelt (Bestiary) – "I have often had the sense that technology is naked, that it has drifted from its animal roots. In Pelt (Bestiary), I want to give digital technology back its fur: to bring the bestial and the messiness of the world back into the realm of digital technology and to continue my work in grounding the digital experience in the material realm and to rethink the human//machine/animal divides. Pelt (Bestiary) is a series of six kinetic and interactive sculptures and five large format drawings that serve as portraits of the beasts. Each piece has its own character and behaviour - some respond to human presence, others move of their own accord."

Portable Sublime – In this installation Ingrid Bachmann uses suitcases to let viewers enter "spaces of provisional wonder. Various events occur when the suitcases are opened. Each suitcase is its own small-scale installation with its own narrative."

Pinocchio's Dilemma explores the "uneasy relationship between the telling of stories and the telling of lies. I am interested in the stories we tell, as individuals and as cultures, and the intersection between lies and stories, fact and fiction. Components include a growing nose and a series of wagging jewel-like tongues."

== Selected exhibitions ==
Angry Work - Mensonges et colère, Galerie Art Mûr, Montreal, Canada, 2017

Hybrid Bodies, Kunstkraftwerk, Leipzig, Germany, 2016

Counterpoint, Galerie Art Mûr, Montreal, Canada, 2015

Hearts and Minds, Hannah Maclure Centre, Dundee, Scotland, 2015

Flesh of the World, Doris McCarthy Gallery, Toronto, Canada, 2015

Despertar/Éveil/Alive, Groupe Molior/Sesc Santana, São Paulo, Brazil, 2014

Havana Biennial, Havana, Cuba, 2012

Quebec Biennial, Manif d’art, 2012

Lab 30, Augsburg, Germany, 2010

Transit/Transitions, Galerie du Centro Cultural Pontificia Universidad Catolica del Peru, Lima, 2007

Zoo, Interaccess Gallery, Toronto, Canada, 2007

Portable Sublime, Optica Gallery, Montreal, Canada, 2003

Hôpital, Galerie Articule, Montreal, Canada, 2001

A Nomad Web: Sleeping Beauty Wakes Up, Walter Phillips Gallery, Banff, Canada, 1993-95

Berlin Stories, The Banff Centre, Or Gallery, Textile Museum, Canada, 1991-3

== Other ==
Bachmann is a professor emerita of Studio Art at Concordia University in Montreal. She was a founding member of Hexagram: Institute for Research and Creation in the Media Arts and is the Director of the Institute of Everyday Life. Hexagram is an inter-university network based in Quebec, between Concordia University and five other partner universities. It's aim is to support knowledge sharing, research-creation and interdisciplinary methodologies in the arts. Before Concordia she taught at the Art Institute of Chicago.

Bachmann is also a writer and editor. She is the co-editor of Material Matters (YYZ Books, 1998, 1999, 2011) and has contributed essays to several anthologies and periodicals including The Object of Labor, MIT Press 2007.

She has given invited talks at such venues as the Banff Center for the Arts, ISEA (The International Symposium of Electronic Arts), Goldsmiths College (University of London), University of Wollongong, Australia, and the University of Maryland at Baltimore, The School of the Art Institute of Chicago, among others.
