= Nelson Henricks =

Canadian artist (born 1963)

- Born: Nelson Henricks; 1963 (age 62–63); Bow Island, Alberta
- Occupation: Artist
- Known for: Video artist
- Website: nelsonhenricks.com

Nelson Henricks (born 1963) is a Canadian artist known for his video works. Originally from Bow Island, Alberta, he received a diploma in visual arts from the Alberta College of Art. In 1991 he relocated to Montréal and obtained a Bachelor of Fine arts in Cinema from Concordia University. Henricks also works as a writer and curator. His texts have been published in many periodicals and publications relating to contemporary art, including the magazines Fuse, Esse, Parachute and Public.

== Work ==
Henricks has developed his work using a dual approach, creating immersive works, with a music all their own, along with subjects from the history of art and culture, including, more recently, the American abstract painter Joan Mitchell.

== Selected exhibitions ==
Henricks has participated in many group and solo exhibitions. A mid-career retrospective of Henricks's work entitled Nelson Henricks : Time Will Have Passed = Le temps aura passé. was presented at the Leonard and Bina Ellen Gallery in 2010. Henricks was a part of the Quebec Triennale 2011 held at the Musée d'art contemporain de Montréal.

In 2021, he was one of the participants in John Greyson's experimental short documentary film International Dawn Chorus Day.

In 2022, the Musée d'art contemporain de Montréal (MACM) held the show Nelson Henricks: Unpublished works.

== Collections ==
Henricks's work is included in the permanent collections of the National Gallery of Canada, the Museum of Modern Art in New York, The Musée national des beaux-arts du Québec in Quebec and the Chicago Video Data Bank.

== Awards ==
In 2002 Henricks received the Bell Canada Award in Video Art. In 2015, he was the laureate of the Giverny Capital Prize.
