= Ingrid Baeyens =

Belgian mountaineer, born 1956

Intrid Baeyens
Personal information
- Born: 8 January 1956 (age 70) Ramsel, Antwerp, Belgium

Climbing career
- Type of climber: Alpine climber
- Known for: First woman to summit South Face of Annapurna; First Belgian woman to summit Mount Everest

Ingrid M. Baeyens (8 January 1956 in Ramsel, Belgium) is a Belgian mountaineer and physical therapist. She became the first woman to summit the South Face of Annapurna in 1991, and the first Belgian woman to summit Mount Everest in 1992.

== Biography ==
Ingrid Baeyens was born in Ramsel, Antwerp, Belgium on 8 January 1956.

She began mountaineering in the Alps in the early 1980s.

She would go on to climb in the Andes with her husband Wim Verbist, until he died in 1987 during a climb in Peru. She then turned to climbing in the Himalayas, notably participating in expeditions with Krzysztof Wielicki and Rob Hall.

In December 1990, she attempted a winter ascent of Makalu, which had been unclimbed in winter until that point. Alongside an expedition team of Krzysztof Wielicki, Anna Czerwinska, and Richard Pawlowski, they made it to 7,400m before having to turn back. Makalu would not be summitted successfully in winter until nearly 20 years later, in 2009.

She summitted four eight-thousanders, including the South Face of Annapurna. After becoming the first Belgian woman to summit Everest in 1992, she retired from climbing in the Himalayas. At the time, she was the female mountaineer with the most eight-thousanders after Wanda Rutkiewicz.

In 1994, Baeyens and Paul Laeremans became hypothermic while descending the West Buttress route of Denali. After their team created a snow cave for them to rest, they were successfully helicoptered to safety.

== Notable ascents and attempts ==
- Gasherbrum II (8,035 m) 8 August 1988
- Dhaulagiri (8,167 m) 11 May 1990
- Unsuccessful winter attempt of Makalu (8,463 m), in December 1990 with Krzysztof Wielicki
- Annapurna (8,091 m) (South face via the Bonington route) 23 October 1991, the first ascent ever by a woman
- Everest (8,849 m) 12 May 1992, the first ascent by a Belgian woman
