= Fuckersberg =

Populated place in Upper Austria, Austria

- Ortschaft
- Coordinates: 48°19′06″N 013°34′33″E
- Country: Austria
- State: Upper Austria
- District: Schärding District
- Municipality: Zell an der Pram
- Founded: 1843

Population
  - Total: 21

Fuckersberg is a populated place (Ortschaft) in the municipality of Zell an der Pram, Schärding District in Upper Austria, Austria. As of 1 January 2019, the population was 21. The town is known by English speakers for its rather unusual name, which contains the English profanity Fuck.

In 1843, Fuckersberg had been mentioned as a populated place in Zell an der Pram.

== See also ==
- Oberfucking
- Unterfucking
- Fugging, Upper Austria (known as Fucking until 2021)
- Fugging, Lower Austria (known as Fucking until 1836)
- Penistone
- Scunthorpe
- Bell End
- Shitterton
