= Butt Hole Road =

Former name of a street

- Archers Way (2009–present)
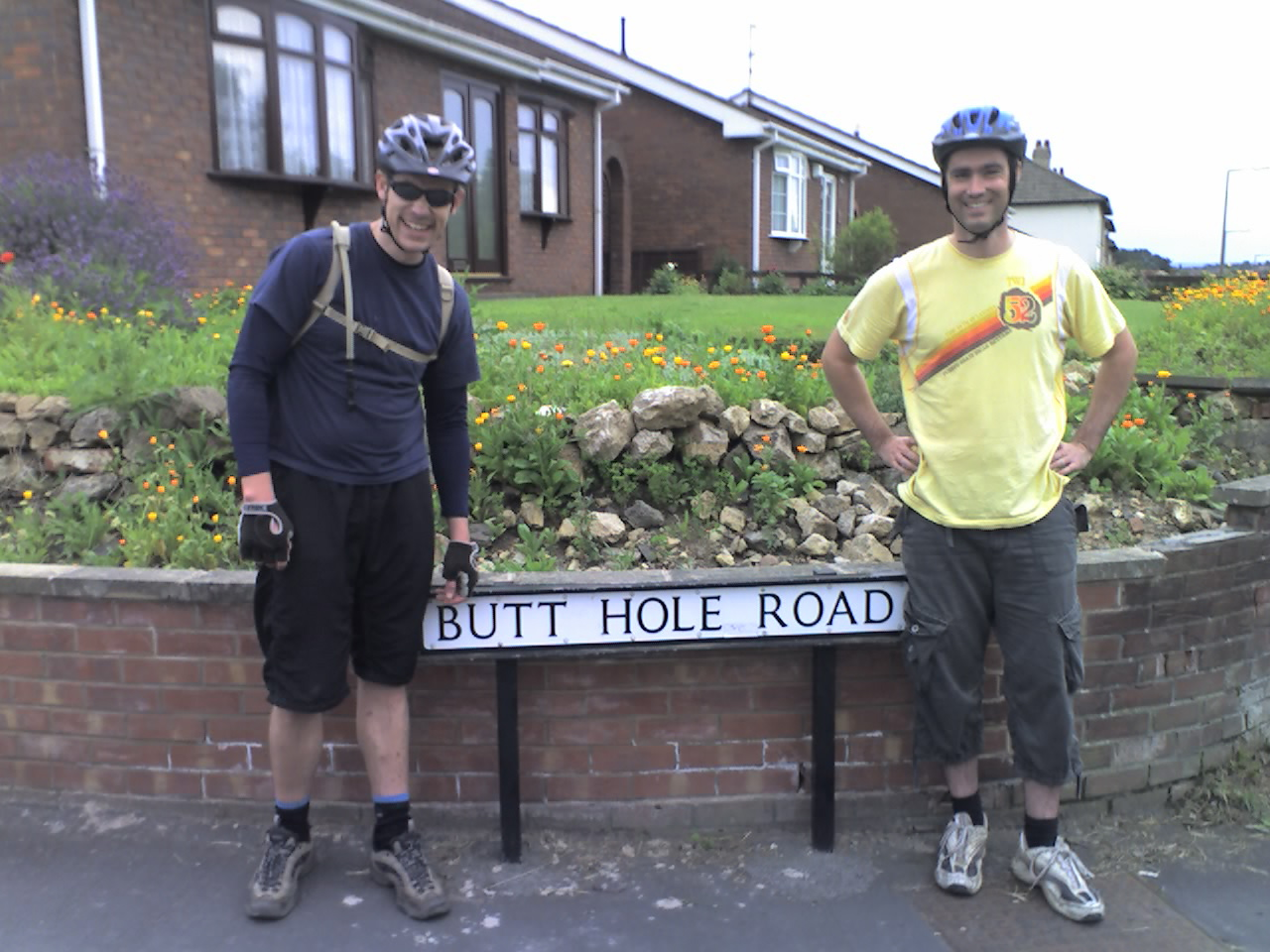
- Former street sign with tourists posing
- Interactive map of Butt Hole Road
- Length: 350 ft (110 m)
- Location: Conisbrough, Doncaster, South Yorkshire, England
- Postal code: DN12 3BN
- Coordinates: 53.484691°N 1.211447°W
- South end: Dead end south of Ravens Walk
- North end: A630 Sheffield Road

Archers Way, formerly named Butt Hole Road, is a street in Conisbrough, Doncaster, South Yorkshire, England. The short residential street gained fame for its suggestive name and was frequented by tourists who would stop to take photos by its street sign. Residents living on the street experienced issues with their address, as they were refused services due to the name and were the target of pranks and jokes. After privately raising funds for a new street sign and seeking approval from the local government, residents had the name of the street changed in 2009.

== Description and popularity ==
The street formerly known as Butt Hole Road is a small residential street within the town of Conisbrough in South Yorkshire. It begins at a dead end and runs north for 350 feet (110 m) to its northern end, where it intersects with the A630 Sheffield Road. It intersects with two smaller streets, Butterbusk and Ravens Walk, and features four homes on its east side. Prior to its name change, the street gained international notoriety for its suggestive naming, as "butthole" is a vulgar slang term for "anus" in American English, and can also be used as an insult. In 2004, a Reuters article widely circulated on the internet about a family who moved out of their £150,000 (equivalent to about £271,000 in 2025) bungalow on the street because they were embarrassed by the street's name. Doncaster Council, the local governing body, has no record of where Butt Hole Road got its name but residents of the street believe that it was named after a communal water butt that was originally located in the area. One resident living on the street initially thought the address "would be fun", but claimed that the novelty quickly wore off. After a picture of the street sign appeared online, the street became so famous that tour buses would bring American tourists to visit, some of whom were seen taking pictures in front of the sign with their buttocks exposed. The street sign was subjected to theft and had to be replaced multiple times.

While it was a popular destination for tourists, residents reported that local businesses such as delivery and taxicab services would not serve those living on Butt Hole Road, as the companies believed that the name was a part of a practical joke. Residents also claimed to have received many prank calls, and some residents eventually had their phone numbers removed from public listings. The name of the street inspired authors Ed Hurst and Rob Bailey to create the book Rude Britain, a compilation of "inappropriate" place names in Great Britain, after reading an article about a couple who purchased a house on the street.

== Name change ==
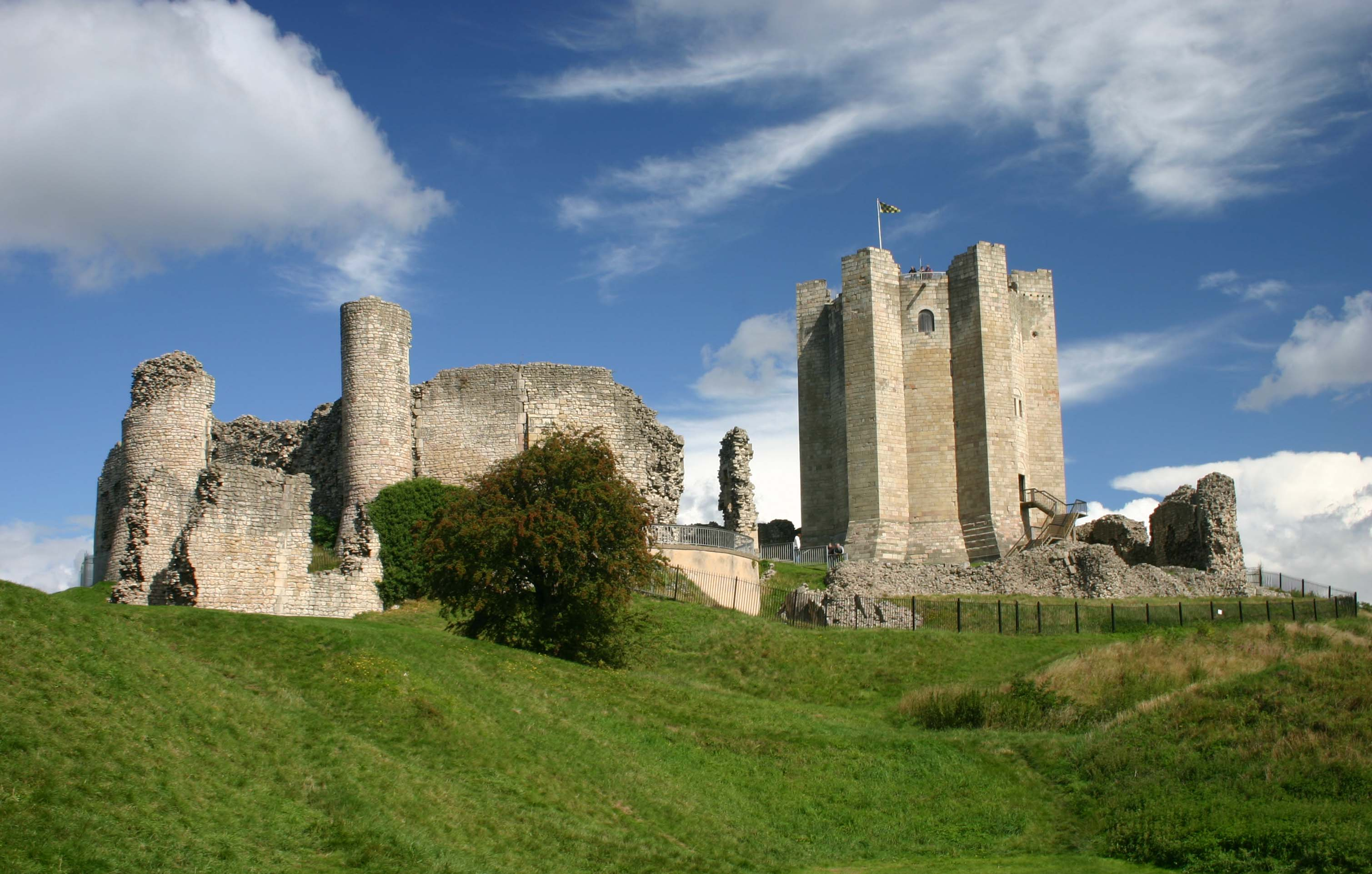
The street was renamed to "Archers Way" in honour of the nearby Conisbrough Castle

Residents of Butt Hole Road were determined to have the name of the street changed to deter tourists from visiting the street and to put an end to the jokes made about the street's name. Planners allowed the change as all of the residents on the street were in favour of the new name. As Doncaster Council would only replace a street sign if it was damaged or in a state of disrepair, the residents of Butt Hole Road had to raise £300 for a new street sign. On 22 April 2009, the street was renamed to "Archers Way", in honour of the 930-year-old Conisbrough Castle, located half a mile (0.8 km) away. Shortly after the name change, an informal Facebook petition was created to change the road back to its original name. The renaming of the street gained worldwide attention and was featured in such international publications as The New Zealand Herald, Bild (Germany), and Het Laatste Nieuws (Belgium).

In 2015, in reference to the name change of Butt Hole Road, residents of the similarly named Butthole Lane in Shepshed, Leicestershire said they planned to keep the name of their street and were not bothered by the "puerile humour" that is affiliated with it, with one resident claiming that the street is "part of the tradition of Shepshed".

== See also ==
- Fugging, Upper Austria – Village in Upper Austria
- Gropecunt Lane – Street name in England in the Middle Ages
- Shitterton – Hamlet in Dorset, England
