= Fugging =

Fugging may refer to:

- Fugging, Upper Austria, a village in Upper Austria, formerly known as Fucking until 2021
- Fugging, Lower Austria, a village in Lower Austria, formerly known as Fucking until 1836

== See also ==
- Fucking (disambiguation)
