= Fucking =

Fucking may refer to:

- Fucking, an English profanity derived from fuck
- Fucking, a synonym for sexual intercourse
- Fugging, Upper Austria, a village known as Fucking until 2021
- Fugging, Lower Austria, a village known as Fucking until 1836

== See also ==
- First Kitchen, a Japanese restaurant sometimes abbreviated "Fakkin")
- Fuck (disambiguation)
- Fugging (disambiguation)
- Fukin (disambiguation)
- Fuqing
- Fuxing (disambiguation)
