= All Wishes Come True! =

2026 Chinese animated film

- Theatrical release poster
- Simplified Chinese: 八仙！
- Traditional Chinese: 八仙！
- Literal meaning: The Eight Xian!
- Hanyu Pinyin: Bāxiān!
- Directed by: Mu Zhengyang
- Screenplay by: Mu Zhengyang
- Based on: Dongyouji by anonymous Ming dynasty writer; Huang Liang Yi Meng by anonymous Yuan dynasty writer
- Produced by: Cao Linlin
- Starring: Li Shaozhe; Chen Hao; Lidong; Guozi Gege; Dong Tianyi; Yu Pengli
- Edited by: Liu Heng
- Music by: Shen Björn Shen
- Production companies: Pearl Studio; China Media Capital; Tianjin Maoyan Weiying Culture Media; Ruyi Film; Ruyi Films (Shanghai); China Film Group (2010); 北京萌谷文化傳媒有限公司; Damai.cn; Beijing Enlight Media
- Release date: July 18, 2026 (China)
- Running time: 144 minutes
- Country: China
- Language: Mandarin
- Box office: ¥2.06 billion

All Wishes Come True! (Chinese: 八仙！; pinyin: Bāxiān!; lit. 'The Eight Xian!') is a 2026 Chinese animated xianxia fantasy adventure film produced by Pearl Studio written and directed by Mu Zhengyang. Based loosely on a collections of legends, it serves as a backstory to the Eight Xian Immortals from Chinese mythology.

The film was developed and animated primarily in the city of Chengdu, a major hub for Chinese animation.

== Plot ==
In the Penglai Realm, eight ordinary mortals disguise themselves as Xian Immortals to enter a treasure vault that only gods can access. Their quest for unimaginable riches and treasures soon draws them into a confrontation with powerful deities, forcing them to use their wit and human ingenuity to overcome challenges and become the Eight Immortals.

== Voice cast ==
Voice Actor	Character	Notes
Li Shaozhe	Lü Dongbin	
Chen Hao	Zhongli Quan	
Lidong	He Xiangu	
Dong Tianyi	Han Xiangzi	As the character is going through puberty, the role was performed collaboratively by three voice actors.
Yu Pengli	Han Xiangzi	As the character is going through puberty, the role was performed collaboratively by three voice actors.
Huang Yushuo	Han Xiangzi	As the character is going through puberty, the role was performed collaboratively by three voice actors.
Zhang Yunqi	Cao Guojiu	
Cao Zhishan	Lan Caihe	
Deng Xiansen	Zhang Guolao	
Han Yuze	Fu Xing	
Lingqi	Lu Xing	
Zhang Tianyu	Shou Xing	

== Production ==
=== Development ===
In April 2024, the China Film Administration registered the project under the title 八仙之瞒天过海 (The Eight Immortals: Crossing the Sea by Deception). Pearl Studio and CMC Pictures became attached as producers.

=== Production ===
The film was primarily animated in Chengdu by the company Huameng Chengzhen, in collaboration with Shanghai-based animation studio Pearl Studio, under the guidance of director Mu Zhengyang, as well as Su Hang for action design.

The team said they researched classical texts, folk traditions, and character archetypes, then reworked the story around the period before the Eight Immortals become immortals. Visually, they aimed for a “smoky, folkloric nianhua painting” feel translated through animation. For Penglai they drew on texts such as Xuanzhongji (玄中記) by Guo Pu and the Taiping Guangji collection of stories, and based their artwork on a traditional style of Chinese landscape painting.

The full dubbing was done in the same city of Chengdu, handled by Shengyu Culture, with Chen Hao handling voice direction. He claimed to have worked through the script with the team three times, each session lasting five days, and that the full dubbing plus later revisions took less than two months.

=== Post-production ===
Post-production and editing were all overseen by Pearl Studio in Chengdu, within the Tianfu Long Island Digital Creative Park.

== Music ==
The musical score for All Wishes Come True! was composed by Shen Björn Shen.

The film's soundtrack features several songs, including the theme song 全世界的雨, performed by Zhou Shen and Ella Chen, and the insert song 过海, performed by Wang Heye and Huang Ling.

Soundtrack
Title	Performer(s)
全世界的雨	Zhou Shen, Ella Chen
过海	Wang Heye, Huang Ling
八仙	Cheng Xiang
献天缘 - 精制版	Li Dongying
什么是逍遥	Wang Yixue Able
难渡	Deng Yujun
天府乐	Nanjing

== Story Inspiration ==
The overarching theme is based on the Yuan Dynasty zaju Huang Liang Yi Meng, which tells of a dream that Zhongli Quan gave Lü Dongbin after repeatedly failing the keju imperial exams. Upon waking from the dream and realizing the fleetingness of life, Lu Dongbin decides to follow Zhongli Quan to train to become a Xian. The production team found that throughout their research in all the stories, Zhongli Quan only helped Lu Dongbin find the Dao, but Lü Dongbin helped He Xiangu, Tie Guaili, and countless others to do the same, and used this concept in the film.

== Release ==
The first teaser was posted in February 2026 during Chinese New Year, giving a first official theatrical release date of July 24, 2026 for Mainland China, with special screenings in early July.

During the main Chengdu premiere event on July 11, the film began merchandising: the license launch covered non-heritage items, stationery, lifestyle goods, and collectibles, selling them through Taobao, WeChat, Xiaohongshu, and Douyin, as well as over 200 cinemas in Sichuan as offline points of sale.

== Reception ==
=== Box office ===
In July 2026, the total box-office revenue from previews and pre-sales exceeded ¥20 million (US$2.95 million).

=== Critical response ===
On the review aggregator website Rotten Tomatoes, 100% of 11 critics' reviews are positive, with an average rating of 7.8/10.

At the 2026 Weibo Awards, the film won the Animated Film of the Year award.

== See also ==
- List of Chinese animated films
