= Oberfucking =

Settlement in Austria

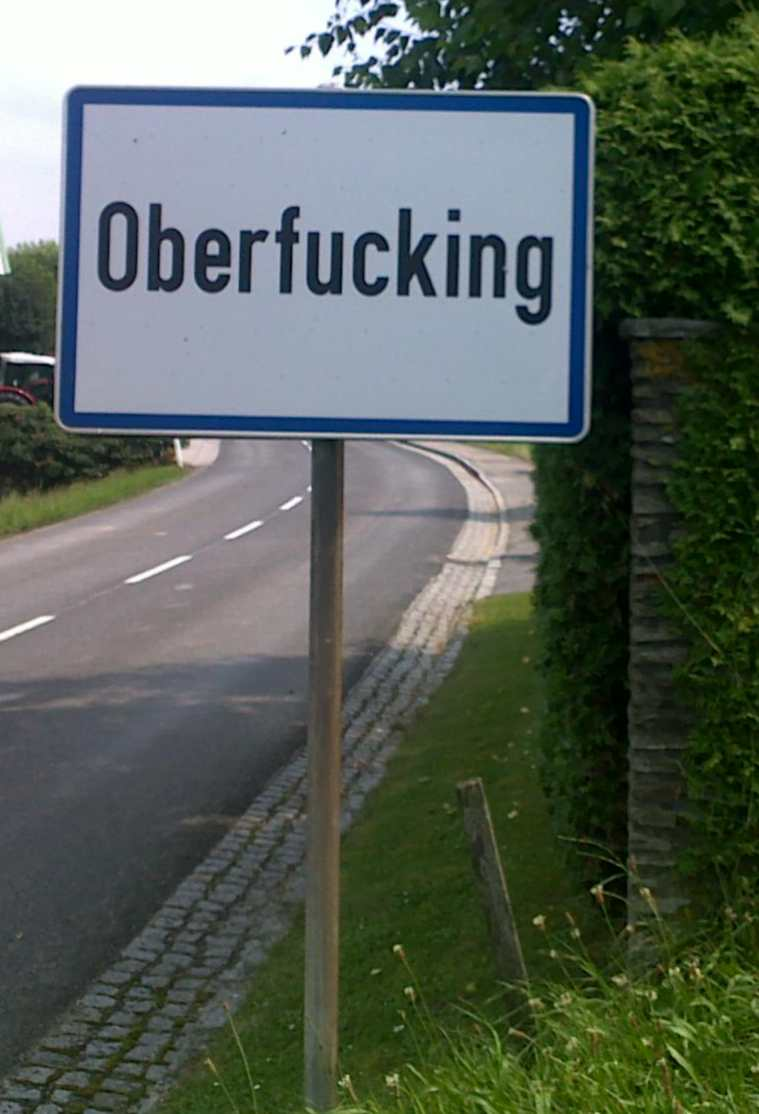
- A local Oberfucking sign displaying the town name pictured in 2010

- Location within Austria
- Coordinates: 48°23′00″N 013°28′00″E
- Country: Austria
- State: Upper Austria

Oberfucking is a populated place in Upper Austria, Austria.

It is a part of the town St. Marienkirchen bei Schärding in district Schärding, near the border to Germany. Oberfucking has 38 inhabitants (by January 2020).

Oberfucking has often been included in lists of places with unusual names, due to containing the English-language expletive "fuck".

The name of the village was based upon the 6th century Bavarian noble Focko. In the 1800s, whilst it was a part of Austria-Hungary, the village's name was spelt as "Ober Fucking". By the 1960s, it was officially confirmed that it was spelt without the space.

The village was also formally surveyed in the 1940s by the Nazi German authorities in German-occupied Austria. It is located near the villages of Unterfucking and Fugging (known as Fucking until 2021). Despite the former Fucking village opting to change its name due to English-speaking tourists regularly stealing the village's sign and mocking the name, both Oberfucking and Unterfucking opted to retain their names despite speculation they might follow suit.

== See also ==
- Fugging, Upper Austria
- Unterfucking
- Sankt Marienkirchen bei Schärding
- Shitterton
