= Purbeck stone =

Limestone from Dorset

Purbeck stone refers to building stone taken from a series of limestone beds found in the Upper Jurassic to Lower Cretaceous Purbeck Group, found on the Isle of Purbeck, Dorset in southern England. The best known variety of this stone is Purbeck Marble. The stone has been quarried since at least Roman times up to the present day.

== Geology ==
The Purbeck Group is a sequence of sedimentary rocks that were deposited in a shallow freshwater to brackish lagoonal setting. It ranges in age from Tithonian to Berriasian. Limestone beds are developed at various levels throughout the sequence, each with a different character, which led to them being quarried for specific uses. Towards the top of the Lulworth Formation is the 'New Vein'. In the lower part of the Durlston Formation are the 'Downs vein, 'Freestone Vein' and the 'Laning Vein'. Towards the top of the Durlston are the 'Burr' (or Broken Shell Limestone) with up to three beds of the 'Purbeck Marble' above that.

== Occurrence ==
The Purbeck Group rocks are found beneath superficial deposits from Worbarrow Tout in the west, to Peveril Point in the east. The sequence is affected by the Purbeck Monocline and dips moderately steeply to the north along its whole outcrop.

== Extraction ==
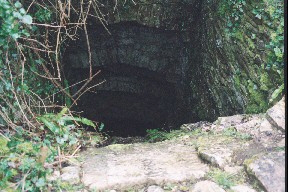
Entrance to a Quarry near Swanage

Initially the stone was taken from shallow opencast workings but, as these became worked out, the quarrymen began to access the stone using shafts, up to 125 ft below the surface. These underground workings, the oldest of which dates from about 1650, were known as Quarrs.

== Use ==
Purbeck stone has been widely used as a building stone particularly in the Purbeck area. The 'Burr' and the 'Freestone Vein' were used as ashlar. The dark colour of the Purbeck Marble meant that it was used for its decorative quality in churches and cathedrals across England, particularly for items such as fonts, tombs, flooring and shafts.

A 1.5-tonne block of Purbeck stone was set at the entrance to Shitterton, Dorset since 2010 in an effort to deter theft.
