= Bere Regis =

Village in Dorset, England

Coordinates: 50.7537°N 2.2191°W

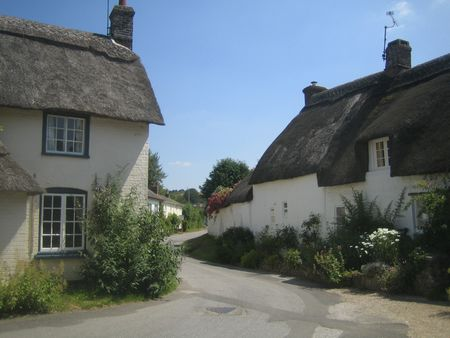
- Thatched cottages in Bere Regis

- Location within Dorset
- Population: 1,745 (2011)
- OS grid reference: SY846948
  - London: 118 miles (190 km) ENE
- Civil parish: Bere Regis
- Unitary authority: Dorset
- Ceremonial county: Dorset
- Region: South West
- Country: England
- Sovereign state: United Kingdom
- Post town: WAREHAM
- Postcode district: BH20
- Dialling code: 01929
- Police: Dorset
- Fire: Dorset and Wiltshire
- Ambulance: South Western
- UK Parliament: Mid Dorset and North Poole
- Website: Bere Regis Village; Bere Regis Parish Council

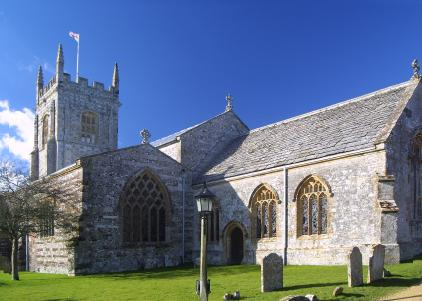
St John the Baptist Church, Bere Regis

Bere Regis (/ˈbɪər ˈriːdʒɪs/) is a village and civil parish in Dorset, England, situated 6 miles (9.7 km) north-west of Wareham. In the 2011 census the civil parish had a population of 1,745.

The village has one shop, a post office, and two pubs, The Royal Oak and The Drax Arms. The parish church is St. John the Baptist Church. The village features in the Domesday Book of 1086.

== History ==
Woodbury Hill, 0.5 miles (0.80 km) east of Bere Regis village, is the site of an Iron Age contour hill-fort, the ramparts of which enclose 12 acres (4.9 ha) on a flat-topped spur of land.

The original settlements in the parish were Shitterton, Bere Regis village and Dodding's Farm, which are all sited by the Bere or Milborne Stream. Later settlements were small farms in the Piddle Valley to the south, first recorded between the mid 13th and mid 14th centuries.

Edward I made Bere Regis a free borough and it was an important market town for a long period, though all domestic buildings built before 1600 have since been destroyed by serious fires in the 17th, 18th and 19th centuries.

In 1905 or 1906, the Bere Regis Arts and Crafts Association was set up by Sarah Bere, who was the wife of the vicar. The group's aim was to revitalise the traditional crafts of raffia basket-making and smock-frock-making. A smock made by the group was bought by or presented to Queen Alexandra in 1910. The association ceased to function about 1919. Some smocks made by its members are in the Museum of English Rural Life; they have Dorset buttons.

=== Architecture ===
Having suffered extensive fires throughout its history, including the most serious in 1777, the village has lost many of its older buildings. There is, however, a selection of Georgian and Victorian buildings. The nearby hamlet of Shitterton, protected by the Bere River from the fires, still retains an extensive selection of older buildings, predominantly thatch.

The oldest parts of the parish church of St John the Baptist are of the 12th century, but additions were made in the following three centuries. The tower is built of stone-and-flint chequerwork, and the timber roof of the nave is said to have been the gift of Cardinal John Morton. Features of interest include the arcades, some 16th-century seating and a number of Purbeck marble monuments. The Victorian and later stained glass is of poor quality.

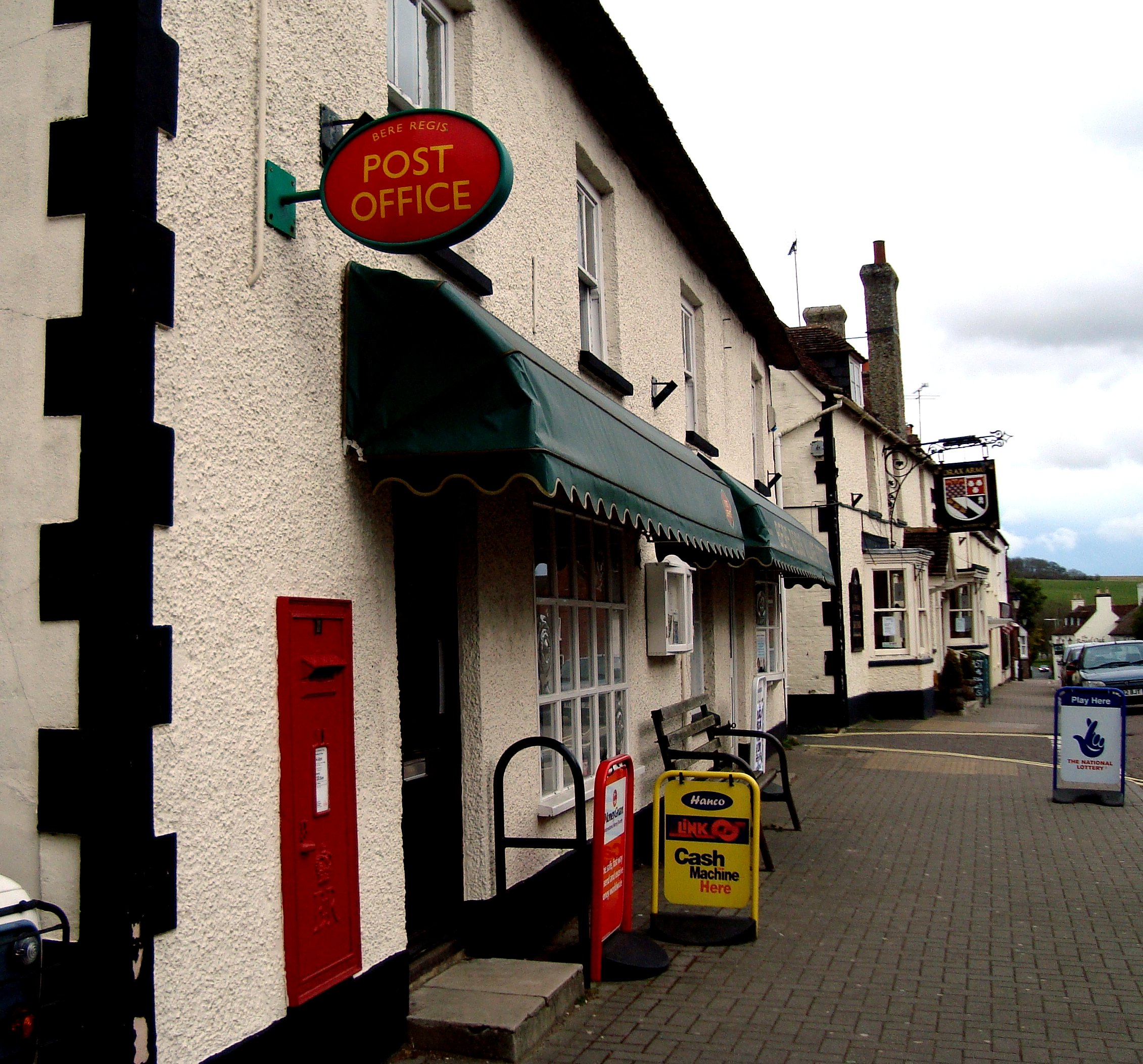
Bere Regis post office

== Governance ==
Bere Regis is in an electoral ward that bears its name and includes neighbouring Bloxworth. The ward population in the 2011 census was 1,945. The ward forms part of the parliamentary constituency of Mid Dorset and North Poole. Its Member of Parliament since 2024 is the Liberal Democrat Vikki Slade.

After 2019 structural changes to local government in England, Bere Regis is part of the West Purbeck ward which elects 2 members to Dorset Council.

It is formerly governed by Purbeck District Council and Bere Regis Parish Council at the parish level. The parish council meets once per month.

== Geography ==
Bere Regis village is sited by the side of the small Bere River or Bere Stream, a tributary of the River Piddle, where the chalk of the Dorset Downs, to the north, dips beneath newer deposits of clay, sands and gravels. The village is situated at the western terminus of the A31 road (Guildford – Bere Regis), where it joins the A35 (Southampton – Honiton), although both roads now bypass the village. The local travel hubs are Wareham railway station, 6 miles (9.7 km) from the village, and Bournemouth Airport, 17 miles (27 km) away.

To the south-east of the village a large conifer plantation, Wareham Forest, stretches several miles to Wareham. To the west is Dorchester, north is Blandford Forum and east is Bournemouth. Further to the south is the chalk ridge of the Purbeck Hills, and 10 miles (16 km) to the south is the Jurassic Coast, a World Heritage Site on the English Channel.

== Demography ==
In the 2011 census Bere Regis civil parish had 852 dwellings, 803 households and a population of 1,745 (867 male, 878 female).

== Culture ==
=== Education ===
The village has one village school: Bere Regis Primary & Pre-School located in Southbrook. This is a mixed primary school for children aged 4–10.

=== Literature ===
The village featured in several novels of Thomas Hardy, most notably, Tess of the D'Urbervilles. The village was portrayed as 'Kingsbere', and the D'Urberville family was based on the de Turberville family of Bere Regis.

=== Cyril Wood Court ===
The village has sheltered housing accommodation, Cyril Wood Court, for older people who have worked in the arts. It was opened in 1988. The accommodation was refurbished in 2010.

=== Sport and recreation ===
Bere Regis has a village sports club and playing fields which can be used for different sports. Bere Regis FC are one of the oldest Football Clubs in England and in Dorset, having been formed in 1885 when they were known as the 'Arabs'.

=== Twin towns ===
Bere Regis is twinned with:

- Cérences, France

== Notable residents ==
- Rosalind Belben, novelist

== See also ==
- Bere Regis (hundred)
- Regis (Place)
- List of place names with royal patronage in the United Kingdom
