= Zell an der Pram =

- Municipality
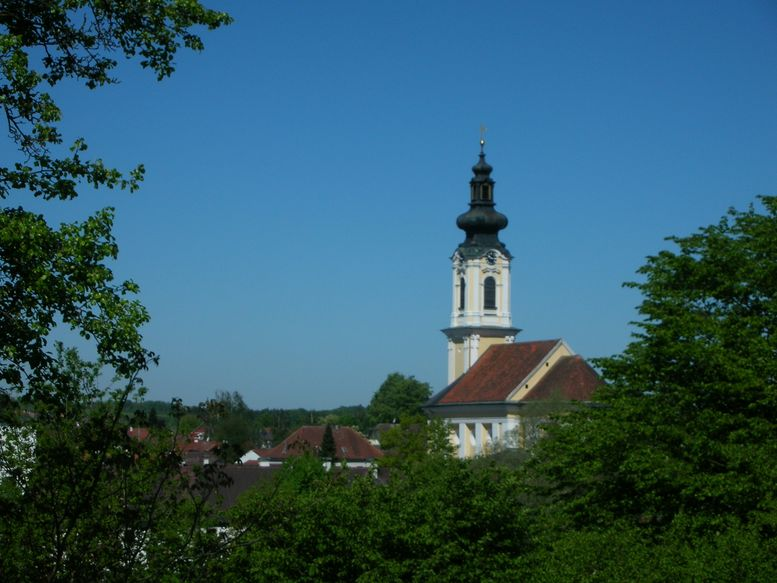

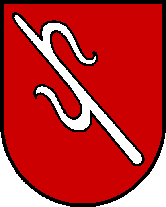
- Flag Coat of arms

- Location within Austria
- Coordinates: 48°19′00″N 13°38′00″E
- Country: Austria
- State: Upper Austria
- District: Schärding

Government
  - Mayor: Matthias Bauer (ÖVP)

Area
  - Total: 23.37 km^{2} (9.02 sq mi)
- Elevation: 367 m (1,204 ft)

Population (2018-01-01)
  - Total: 2,021
  - Density: 86.48/km^{2} (224.0/sq mi)
- Time zone: UTC+1 (CET)
  - Summer (DST): UTC+2 (CEST)
- Postal code: 4755
- Area code: 07764
- Vehicle registration: SD
- Website: www.zell-pram.ooe.gv.at

Zell an der Pram is a town and a municipality in the district of Schärding in the Austrian state of Upper Austria.

== Geography ==
Zell lies in the Innviertel. About 14 percent of the municipality is forest, and 76 percent is farmland.

The municipality includes the following populated places (Ortschaften)

- Aiglbrechting
- Bernetsedt
- Brandesleiten
- Dobl
- Dorf
- Eichberg
- Fuckersberg
- Gmeinedt
- Habekendobl
- Hellwagen
- Holzedt
- Hub
- Jebling
- Krena
- Obergriesbach
- Ornetsedt
- Point
- Reischenbach
- Schwarzgrub
- Sienleiten
- Stögen
- Tischling
- Weireth
- Wiesing
- Wildhag
- Willing
- Würting
- Zell an der Pram
