= Unterfucking =

Settlement in Austria

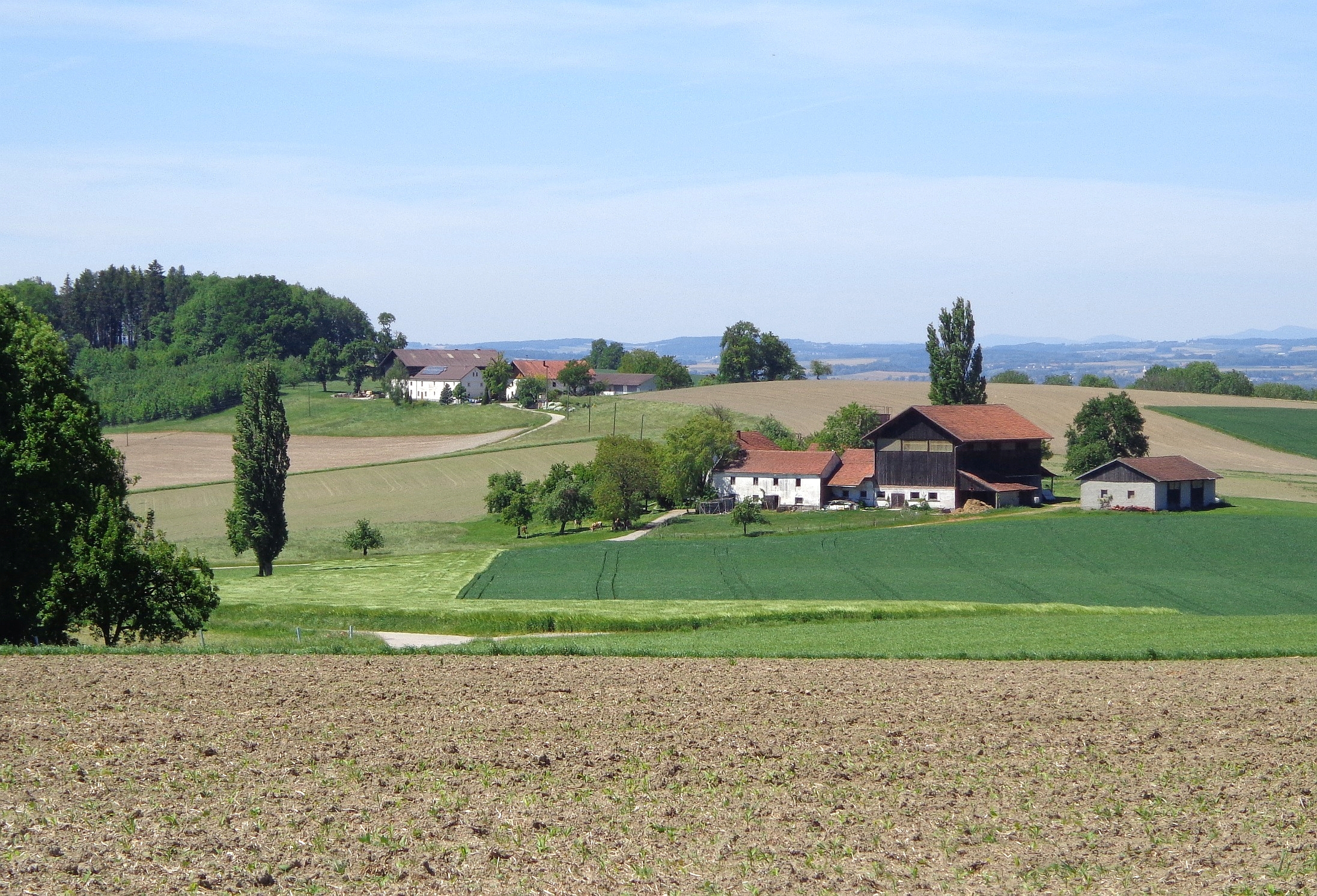
- The Oberrader (left) and Niederrader (right) farms in Unterfucking, 2016

- Location within Austria
- Coordinates: 48°22′00″N 013°29′00″E
- Country: Austria
- State: Upper Austria

Unterfucking is a populated place that is part of Sankt Marienkirchen bei Schärding, Schärding, Upper Austria, Austria. Unterfucking has often been included in lists of places with unusual names, due to the fact that part of its name bears a similarity to the English-language expletive "fuck".

== Geography ==
The name of the village was based upon the 6th century Bavarian noble name "Focko". In the 1800s, whilst it was a part of Austria-Hungary, the village's name was spelt as "Unter Fucking". By the 1960s, it was officially confirmed that it was spelt without the space. The village was also formally surveyed in the 1940s by the Nazi German authorities in German-occupied Austria. It is located near the village of Oberfucking as well as a village that until 2021 was known as Fucking (renamed Fugging). Despite the former Fucking village opting to change its name due to English-speaking tourists regularly stealing the village's sign and mocking the name, both Oberfucking and Unterfucking opted to retain their names despite speculation they might follow suit. The mayor of Sankt Marienkirchen bei Schärding affirmed there would be no change as it was only considered by the council as any other business and they unanimously voted against any change. Unterfucking has two farmhouses there and is the highest point of the district of Sankt Marienkirchen bei Schärding.

== In popular culture ==
In 1929, the British playwright Noël Coward unsuccessfully looked for a European tenor to play Carl Linden for the London West End debut of play, Bitter Sweet, as he had intended to have the tenor perform under the pseudonym of "Hans Unterfucker", named after the village.

== See also ==
- Fugging, Upper Austria
- Oberfucking
- Eggerding
- Mayrhof
