= Fuxing =

Fuxing may refer to:

- Fu star (福星), or Fuxing, Chinese deity
- Fuxing (train) (复兴号, meaning "Rejuvenation"), China Standardized EMU operated by China Railway High-speed (CRH)
- Fuxing Road (disambiguation)
- Chinese compound surname (複姓)

== Mainland China ==
- Fuxing, Li County, in Li County, Hunan

== Taiwan ==
- Fuxing, Changhua (福興鄉), township in Changhua County
- Fuxing District, Taoyuan (復興區), aboriginal district in Taoyuan
- Fuxing Islet (復興嶼), Lieyu Township, Kinmen County
- Fuxing Radio (復興廣播電台), radio station in Taipei

== See also ==
- Fucking (disambiguation)
- Fuqing, a county-level city of Fuzhou in Fujian Province, People's Republic of China
- Fuxinggang metro station, a metro station of Taipei Metro
- Nanjing Fuxing metro station, a metro station of Taipei Metro
- Zhongxiao Fuxing metro station, a metro station of Taipei Metro
