= Šukačka =

Hamlet in Plzeň Region, Czech Republic

- Hamlet
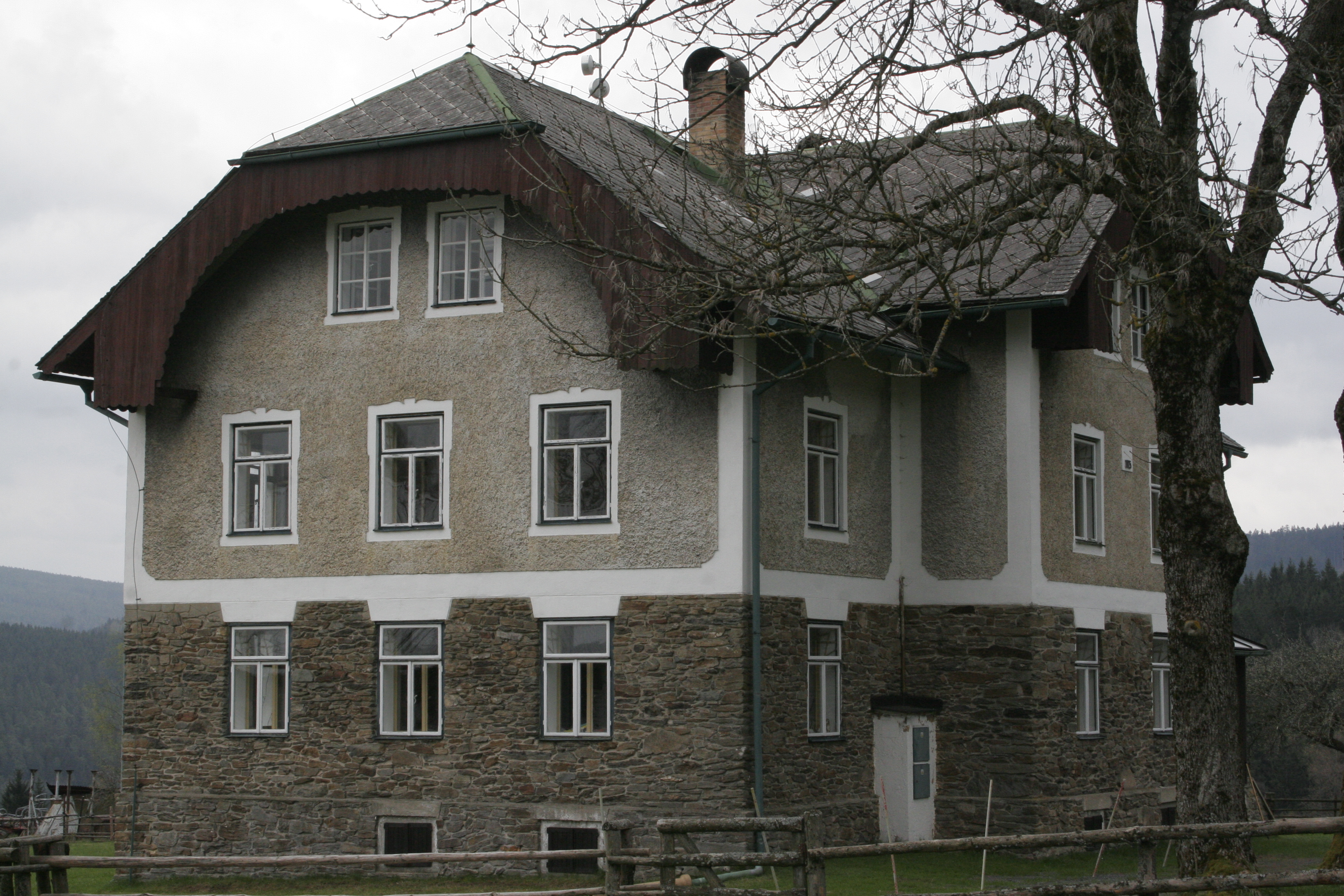
- House in Šukačka

- Location in the Czech Republic
- Coordinates: 49°13′27″N 13°16′15″E
- Country: Czech Republic
- Region: Plzeň
- District: Klatovy
- Time zone: UTC+1 (CET)
  - Summer (DST): UTC+2 (CEST)

Šukačka (German: Schukatschen) is a hamlet in Čachrov in Klatovy District in the Plzeň Region of the Czech Republic. As of 2021, one family lived there.

== Name ==
The settlement is known for its unusual name, which is slang for 'fucking' in Czech. Theories about the etymology include from the German word Schuhkater, which means something like "cat in boots", or the Serbian word šuka, meaning 'goat', and which would refer to goats that were herded there.

== See also ==
- Fugging, Upper Austria
