= Fukin =

Fukin may refer to

- Aleksandr Fukin (born 1985), Russian futsal player
- Wadi Fukin, a Palestinian village

== See also ==
- Fokin, a surname
- Fucking (disambiguation)
