= Woodbury Hill, Dorset =

Hillfort in Dorset, England

Woodbury Hill
- The field where the fair was held. This is the view NNE along the ramparts of the hillfort.

- Location within Dorset
- 50°45′9″N 2°12′17″W
- Type: Hillfort
- Periods: Iron Age; Medieval
- Location: near Bere Regis, Dorset
- OS grid reference: SY 856 948

Site notes
- Area: 5 hectares (12 acres)

Scheduled monument
- Designated: 6 October 1959
- Reference no.: 1016042

Woodbury Hill is a hill near Bere Regis in Dorset, England. It is the site of an Iron Age hillfort (a scheduled monument), and the location of an annual fair from medieval times until the mid 20th century.

== The hillfort ==
The hill overlooks the Winterbourne Valley to the north and the Piddle Valley to the south; immediately to the west is Bere Stream. The irregularly-shaped hillfort has an area of about 5 hectares (12 acres). It is about 272 metres (892 ft) west to east and 410 metres (1,350 ft) north to south, and is enclosed by a single rampart of width 6 to 12 metres (20 to 39 ft); outside this is a ditch of width 9 metres (30 ft) and a counterscarp. The ground outside the defences falls steeply to the east, south and south-west. To the north, where there is a gently sloping strip of land leading to a northern ridge, a second rampart about 60 metres (200 ft) north of the main rampart provides additional defence.

There is an original entrance on the south-west, through which a track leads into the fort, and an original entrance on the north-east; other breaks in the defences are more recent. There is a farmhouse within the fort. Many other structures, shown on the tithe map of 1844, were demolished in the 19th century.

== The medieval chapel and Woodbury Hill Fair ==
On the south-west side within the fort there is the site of a medieval chapel, still standing in the 15th century, but demolished by the 18th century. It was known as the Anchoret's Chapel. A holy well, the Anchoret's Well, is situated 25 metres (82 ft) south-east of the chapel. During the medieval period, the well was thought to have healing properties; there were pilgrimages to drink the water on 21 September, the day of its dedication.

Woodbury Hill Fair, held from 18 to 22 September, probably originated from these annual gatherings. It was already taking place before 1200; charters for the fair were granted by Henry III in 1231, 1235 and 1266, and confirmed in 1325 by Edward II. Merchandise traded included cheese, cloth, cattle, sheep and horses; people came from great distances.

The fair began to decline in the 18th century. In the 1930s it became a fair of entertainment, lasting two days. After suspension during the war it was revived, but the last fair took place in 1951.

== See also ==
- Hillforts in Britain
