= Fucking Hell =

Type of beer

- Fucking Hell label
- Type: Pilsner
- Origin: Germany
- Introduced: 2011
- Alcohol by volume: 4.9%
- Website: fucking-hell.de

Fucking Hell is a German pale lager, a Pilsner, with an alcohol content of 4.9%. It is named after Fucking, the previous name of the village of Fugging in Austria; hell is the German word for 'pale' and a typical description of this kind of beer. The beer's name was initially controversial. Both the local authorities in Fucking and the European Union's Trade Marks and Designs Registration Office initially objected to the name. It was eventually accepted and the lager is sold internationally.

== Production ==
Fucking Hell is not brewed in Fugging, but was originally brewed in the Brauerei Waldhaus, a brewery in the Black Forest town of Waldhaus, Weilheim in Germany. From 2013, production moved to the Brauerei Hartmannsdorf in Hartmannsdorf, near Chemnitz. At the time of the launch of Fucking Hell, there was no brewery in the village of Fucking.

Fucking Hell is a pilsner and is not considered to be a true Hellbier, as beers brewed in the traditional Munich style have a malted taste and are slightly darker in appearance.

== History ==
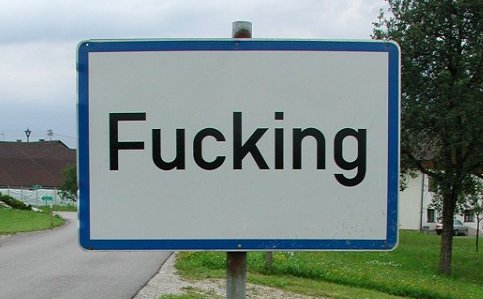
Fucking Hell is humorously named after Fucking, the previous name of Fugging, Austria, a village often mentioned for its unintentionally amusing name.

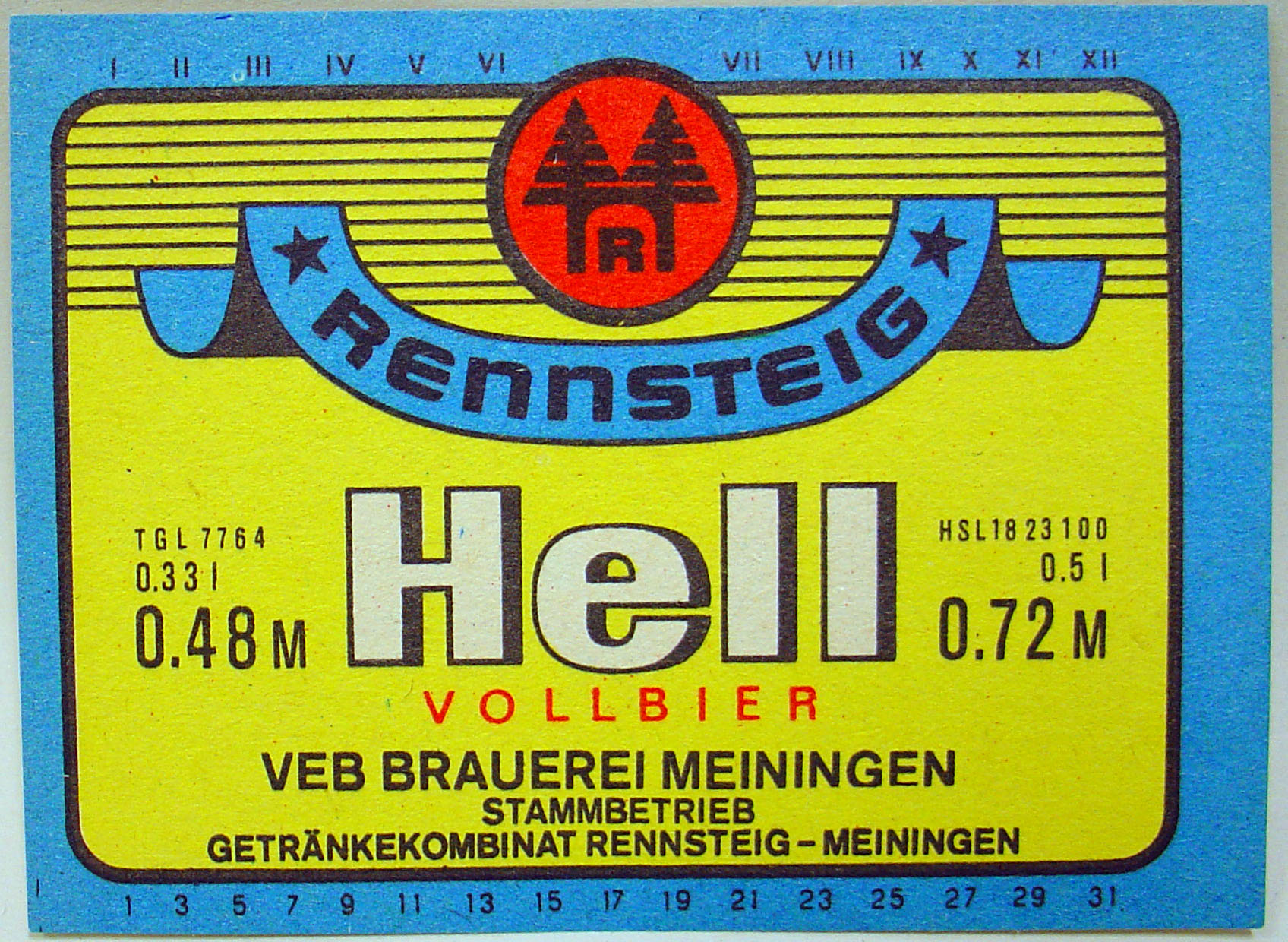
Many German beer brands combine a geographical name with Hell, for example, Rennsteig Hell.

In 2010, three German businessmen, Stefan Fellenberg, Florian Krause and Hans-Jörg Schaller, devised a plan to bring a new beer to market. Krause was originally from Bad Reichenhall, a Bavarian town 20 kilometres (12 mi) over the border from the Austrian village of Fucking. The village's name inspired them to devise a humorous brand name, combined with the German word "Hell" for 'pale lager', and they applied to register a Community Trade Mark for "Fucking Hell".

The European Union's Trade Marks and Designs Registration Office initially refused to grant a trademark for the beer on the grounds that it contained an expletive. However, Fellenberg and Krause argued that the name referred to the village in Austria and that Hell was an Austrian and Southern German term for pale lager. The Trade Marks and Designs Registration Office permitted the registration of the trademark, stating that the name was "an interjection used to express a deprecation, but it does not indicate against whom the deprecation is directed, nor can it be considered as reprehensible to use existing place names in a targeted manner (as a reference to the place), merely because this may have an ambiguous meaning in other languages."

Fellenberg and Krause intended to use the trademark as a brand name and use it to produce Fucking Hell branded food and clothing. The beer went on sale in Europe, Asia and Australia in 2011. In 2020, it was granted a United States trademark.

== See also ==
- Beer in Germany
- List of brewing companies in Germany
- Helles
