= Obritzberg-Rust =

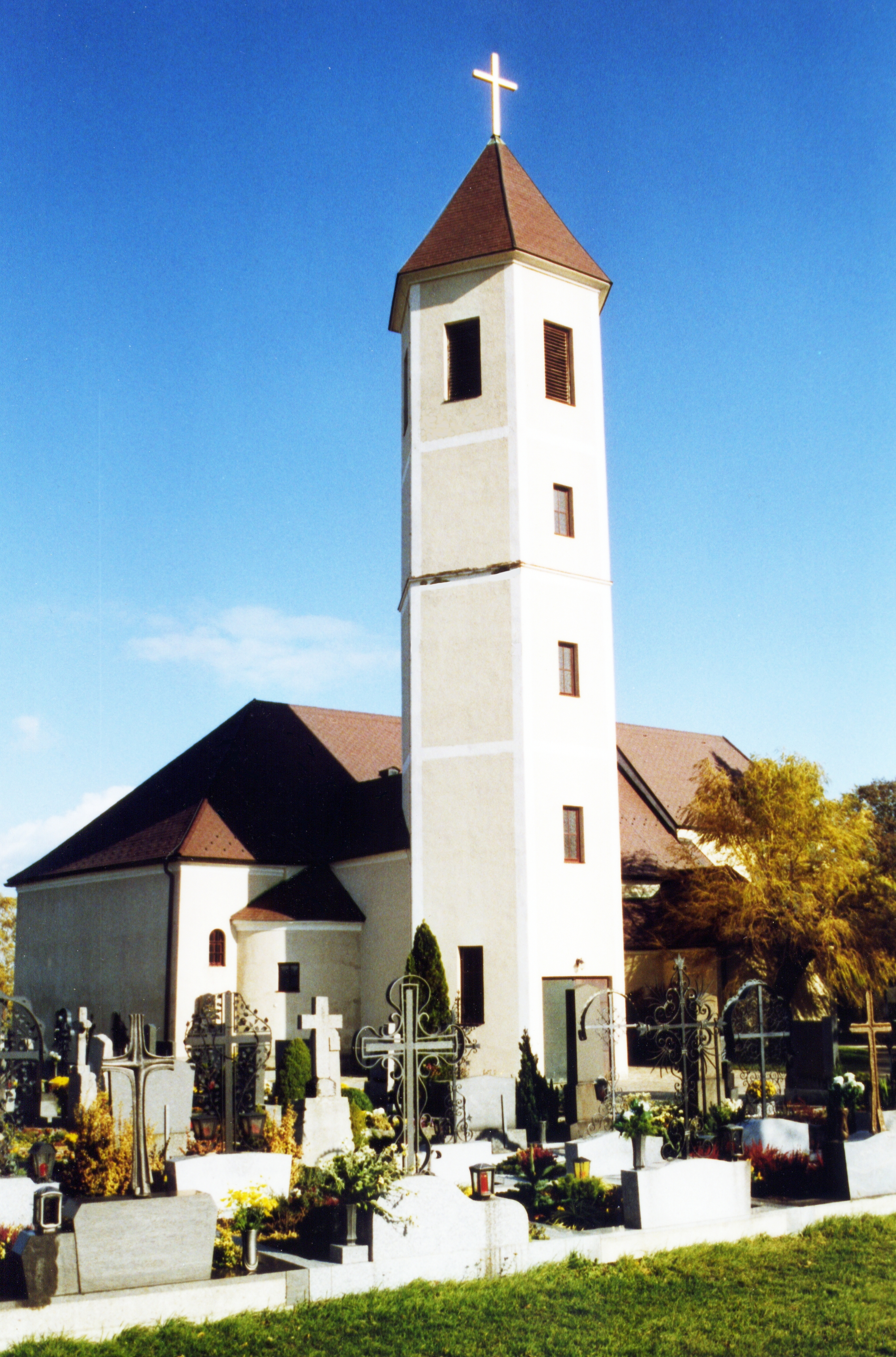
- Obritzberg parish church

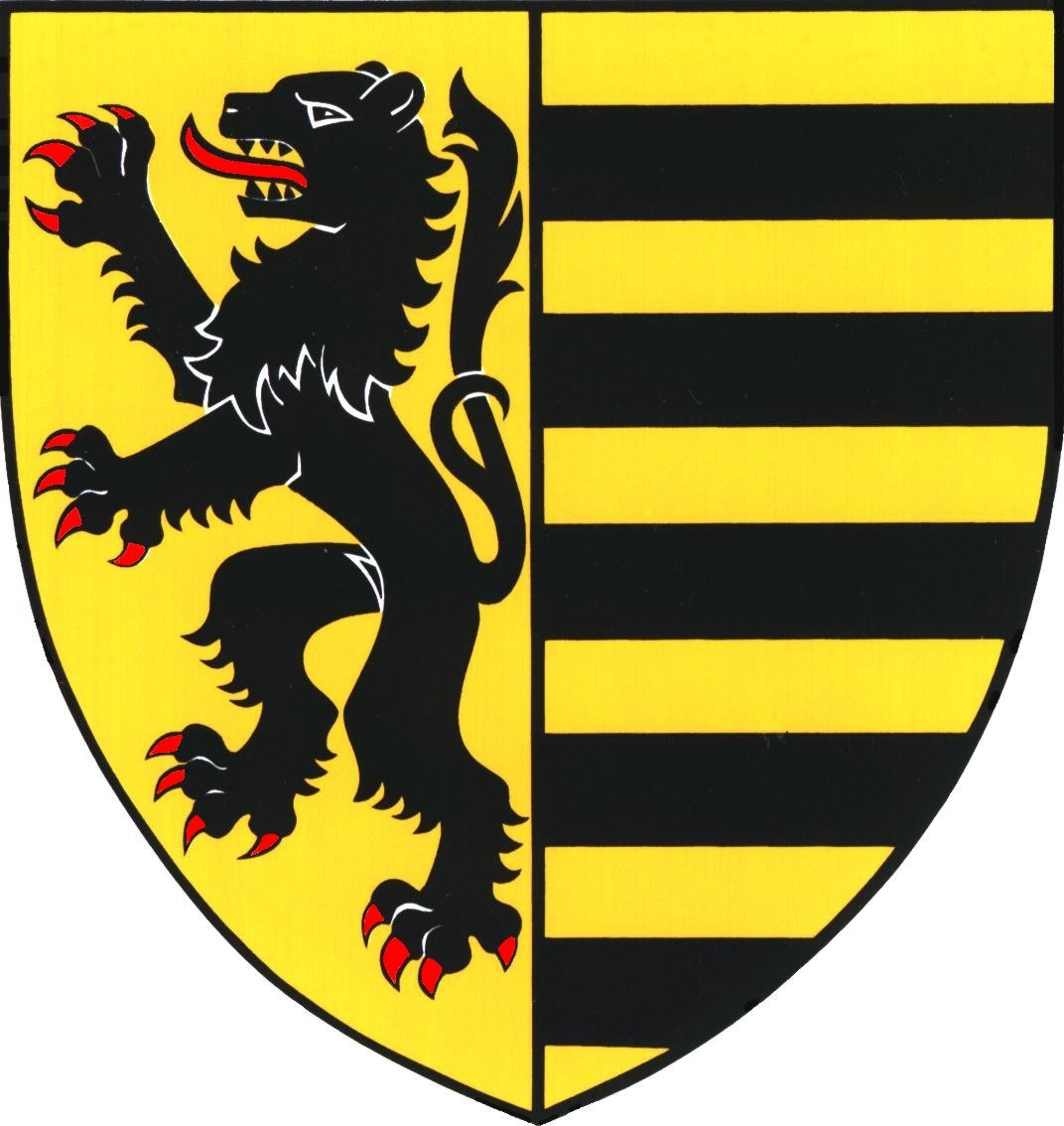
- Coat of arms

- Location within Austria
- Coordinates: 48°17′00″N 15°36′00″E
- Country: Austria
- State: Lower Austria
- District: Sankt Pölten-Land

Government
  - Mayor: Gerhard Wendl (ÖVP)

Area
  - Total: 41.48 km^{2} (16.02 sq mi)
- Elevation: 366 m (1,201 ft)

Population (2018-01-01)
  - Total: 2,342
  - Density: 56.46/km^{2} (146.2/sq mi)
- Time zone: UTC+1 (CET)
  - Summer (DST): UTC+2 (CEST)
- Postal code: 3123
- Area code: 02742, 02782, 02786
- Vehicle registration: PL
- Website: www.obritzberg-rust.gv.at

Obritzberg-Rust is a municipality in the district of Sankt Pölten-Land in Lower Austria, Austria.

The municipality is divided into 19 cadastral communities. These are Diendorf, Doppel (with the localities of Doppel, Neustift and Hofstetten), Eitzendorf, Flinsdorf, Fugging, Greiling, Großrust, Grünz, Hain (with the localities of Kleinhain, Angern and Großhain), Heinigstetten, Kleinrust, Landhausen, Obermerking, Obritzberg, Pfaffing, Schweinern (with the localities of Schweinern and Thallern), Untermerking (with the localities of Untermerking and Mittermerking), Winzing and Zagging.

== Population ==
Historical population
Year	Pop.	±%
1971	2,028	—
1981	2,106	+3.8%
1991	2,135	+1.4%
2001	2,268	+6.2%
