= A630 road =

Road in England

A630

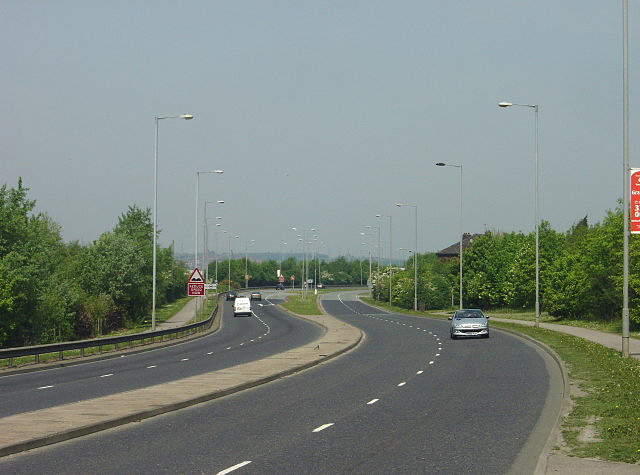
- A630 as Centenary Way in Rotherham

Major junctions
- West end: Sheffield
- A61 A6102 A6135; A57; M1 A631 A1(M) M18
- East end: M18 Junction 4

Location
- Country: United Kingdom
- Primary destinations: Sheffield; Rotherham; Conisborough; Conisborough Castle; Doncaster; Armthorpe

Road network
- Roads in the United Kingdom; Motorways; A and B road zones
← A629	→ A631

The A630 is an A road in the United Kingdom. It runs between Sheffield city centre (53.3762°N 1.3998°W) and junction 4 of the M18 motorway (53.5400°N 1.0229°W), passing through Rotherham and Doncaster on the way. The road is entirely in South Yorkshire.

== Route ==
The road starts at the A57 just outside Sheffield City Centre which forms part of the Sheffield Parkway, then runs to the M1 at Junction 33. Beyond the roundabouts it heads west to Rotherham which it passes as the dual carriageway, four-lane Centenary Way, turning north and northeast towards Conisbrough and Doncaster, passing Conisbrough Castle. Between Warmsworth and Balby it meets the A1(M) at Junction 36. From there it heads east to Doncaster, then passing Armthorpe it heads to the M18 at Junction 4 where the road terminates.

== Motorway junctions ==
The A630 has a junction with M1 at Junction 33 at Catcliffe, another with A1(M) at Junction 36 at Warmsworth, and finally at M18 at Junction 4 at Armthorpe where the road terminates.
