= Damai.cn =

Chinese ticketing website

Damai (大麦网)
- Website type: Ticketing website
- Available in: Chinese, English, Japanese
- Owners: Beijing Pony Media Culture Development Co., Ltd
- Commercial: Yes
- Registration: Required
- Launched: January 23, 2007; 19 years ago
- Current status: Online

Damai or Damai.cn is an entertainment ticketing platform and "comprehensive entertainment brand" in China, with 39 branches around China and based in Beijing. It mainly offers "multiple-tier communication services" in a wide variety of "cultural creation fields". The website is owned by Beijing Pony Media Culture Development Co., Ltd, which was established in 2003.

Damai is the largest entertainment ticketing website in China and successfully raised its daily peak conversion rate to over 10%. It has provided its own ticketing system for concerts in China to validate tickets, such as Rene Liu, Eason Chan, Li Yuchun etc. NBA China Global Games also appointed Damai as ticketing system service.

== History ==
The company that owns Damai.cn Beijing Pony Media Co., Ltd, was established in 2003. Its predecessor was established in 1999. As of 2010, Damai occupied more than 20~30% market share in China within five years. According to the third party statistics, over ten millions of people in more than 100 cities across China have ever used Damai.cn to buy concerts tickets, sports tickets, theater tickets, movie tickets, etc., which was far ahead of other companies and websites.

With the development over a decade, Damai.cn has set up branches in more than 30 cities of China and managed to provide technical support and marketing service for the box office of performances, sport events, movies, travel and other projects. Its distribution channels include performance venues, hotels, travel agencies and all kinds of automated payment terminals.

== Personalized recommendations ==
Damai could show personalized recommendations in very short time to each user. The data of purchasing, browsing and favorites of every user are analysed, and related information based on their preferences and locations would be provided back to them.
