= Tarsdorf =

- Municipality
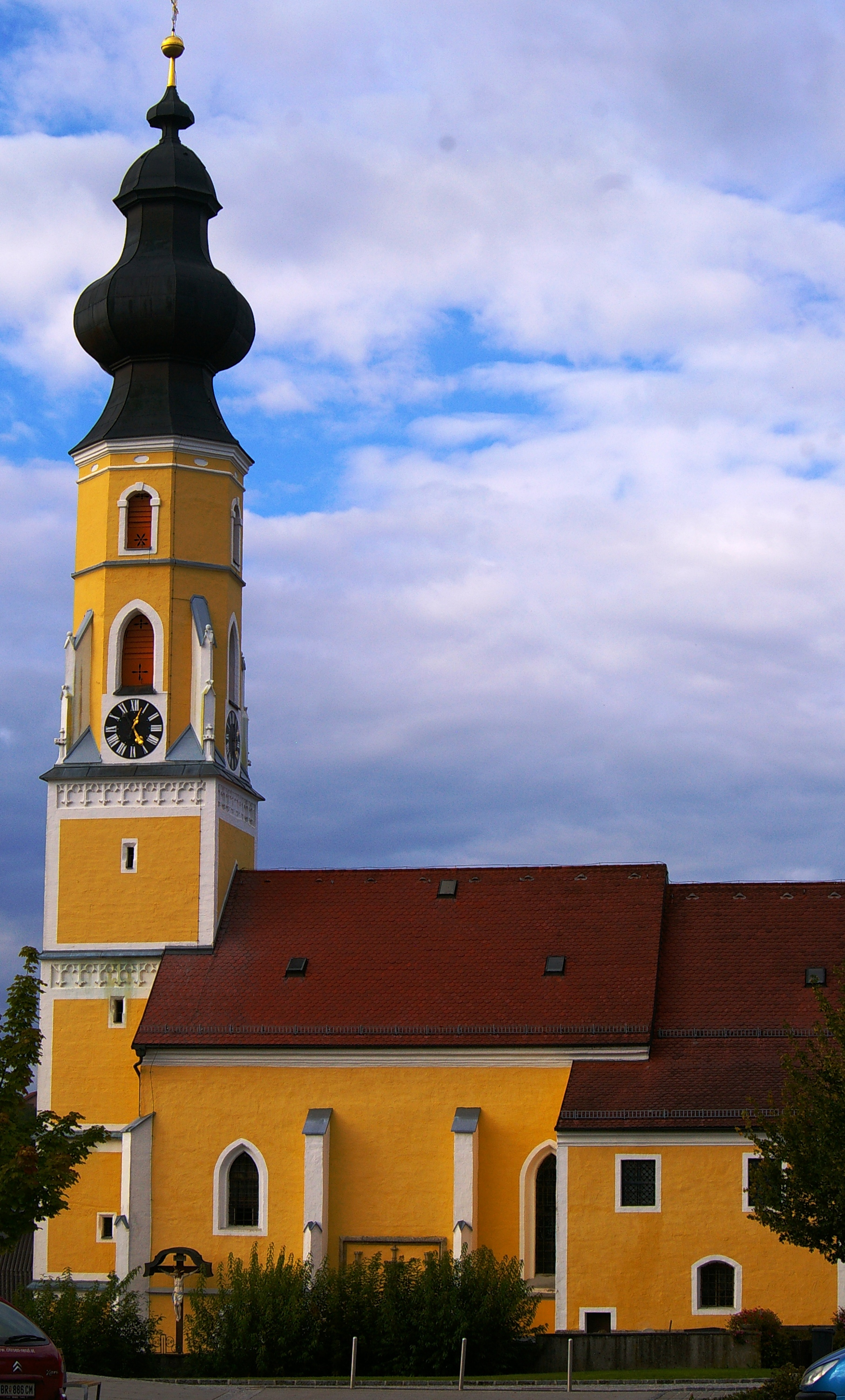

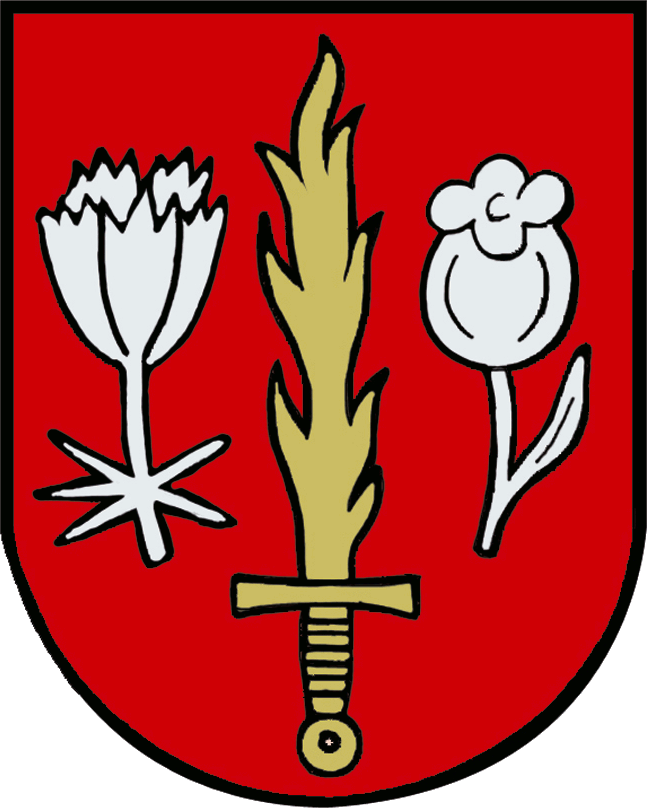
- Coat of arms

- Location within Austria
- Coordinates: 48°04′48″N 12°49′33″E
- Country: Austria
- State: Upper Austria
- District: Braunau am Inn

Government
  - Mayor: Andrea Holzner (ÖVP)

Area
  - Total: 32.34 km^{2} (12.49 sq mi)
- Elevation: 429 m (1,407 ft)

Population (2018-01-01)
  - Total: 2,068
  - Density: 63.95/km^{2} (165.6/sq mi)
- Time zone: UTC+1 (CET)
  - Summer (DST): UTC+2 (CEST)
- Postal code: 5121
- Area code: 06278
- Vehicle registration: BR
- Website: www.tarsdorf.at

Tarsdorf is a municipality in the district of Braunau am Inn in the Austrian state Upper Austria.

== Geography ==
Tarsdorf is located in the Innviertel. Situated at an altitude of 429 metres (1,407 ft), the municipality covers an area of 32.2 km² (12.4 mi²), measuring 7.1 km (4.4 mi) from north to south and 6.8 km (4.2 mi) from east to west. 37.9% of the land is forested, while 54.7% is used for agriculture. The Filzmoos, a raised bog, is located within the municipality.

== Villages ==
The villages in the municipity are (with population in brackets as at 1 Jan 2020):

- Am Anger (69)
- Döstling (50)
- Eckldorf (57)
- Ehersdorf (203)
- Eichbichl (83)
- Fugging (106)
- Haid (48)
- Hofstadt (89)
- Hofweiden (124)
- Hörndl (243)
- Hucking (59)
- Leithen (76)
- Neues Dorf (82)
- Ölling (18)
- Schmidham (38)
- Sensberg (53)
- Sinzing (4)
- Staig (28)
- Tarsdorf (481)
- Wimm (1)
- Winham (52)
- Wolfing (45)
- Wupping (51)

== History ==
Finds in the Weilhart Forest indicate that the Tarsdorf area had already been settled by the Neolithic. Burial mounds from the Hallstatt period have been discovered. The area was settled by Celts around 500 BC.

In the Roman era, the road from Salzburg to Burghausen led through Tarsdorf. It ran through Hofweiden, Tarsdorf and Hörndl. The remains of a rustic villa, a millstone, shards of bowls, bricks from an underfloor heating system, pieces of plaster and a silver coin, all dating back to the first four centuries AD, have been discovered between Hofweiden and Tarsdorf.

In the sixth centuries the immigrating Bajuwars, ancestors of today's Bavarians, cleared large parts of the Weilhart-forest.

=== Population Development ===
Year	Population
1869	1.115
1880	1.128
1890	1.172
1900	1.246
1910	1.231
1923	1.259
1934	1.274
1939	1.202
1951	1.380
1961	1.343
1971	1.517
1981	1.652
1991	1.793
2001	1.938
2011	1.998
2020	2.060

== Notable people ==
- Richard Puchner (1883-1965), architect and builder
- Georg Dechant (1884-1953), politician, farmer and landlord
