= Fuxing Road =

Fuxing Road may refer to:

- Fuxing Road, Beijing, road in Beijing, China
- Fuxing Road (Taipei), road in Taipei, Taiwan
