= Street sign theft =

Illegal removal of street signs

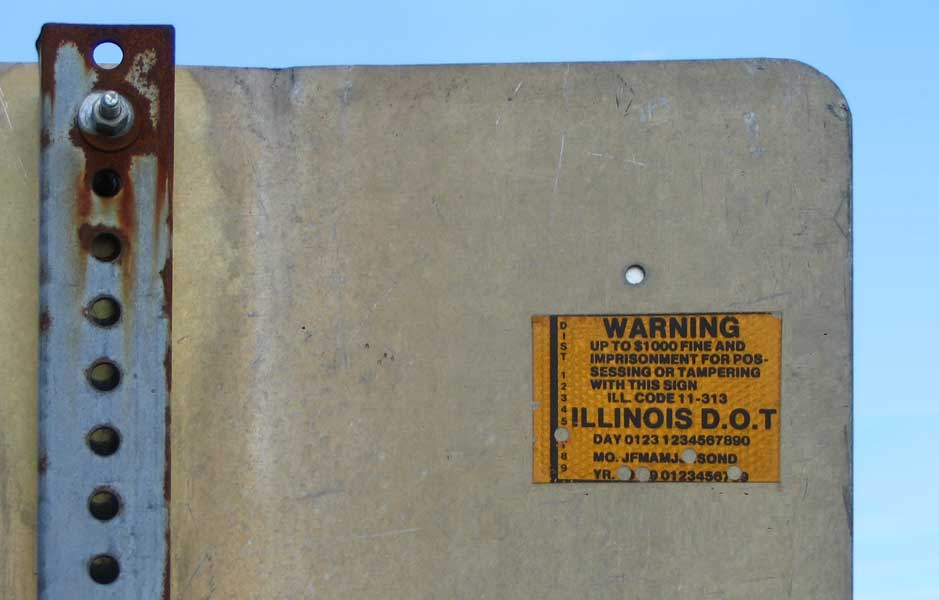
A sticker on the back of this Illinois street sign is intended to deter theft.

Street signs can be stolen for use as decorations or to be sold as scrap metal. Although theft often seems arbitrary, signs with unusual or amusing names tend to be stolen more frequently. Sometimes considered to be a prank by the perpetrators, the theft is often costly and inconvenient for the municipality or agency that owns the sign, and it poses a danger to traffic. In the United States, each street sign generally costs between $100 and $500 to replace.

== In law ==
The theft of traffic signage is typically treated like any other theft of public property with respect to prosecution and sentencing. However, people who steal street signs may also be found criminally liable for any injury or death resulting from the removal of a sign. In 1997, after a collision which killed three people, three young adults in the United States who stole a stop sign from the intersection where the crash occurred were found guilty of manslaughter. It was the first time street sign theft had led to a manslaughter charge in the country. Thomas Miller, and his friends, Chris Cole and Nissa Baillie were sentenced to between 27 and 46 years in prison, but would go free after only five years after a judge ordered a retrial because the prosecutor had overemphasized certain evidence in her closing arguments. The prosecution declined to bring the case a second time.

== Prevention ==
Many jurisdictions place stickers on street signs warning of the legal punishment for their theft. Some cities (e.g. Toronto) use specially designed bolts to attach signs and prevent removal.

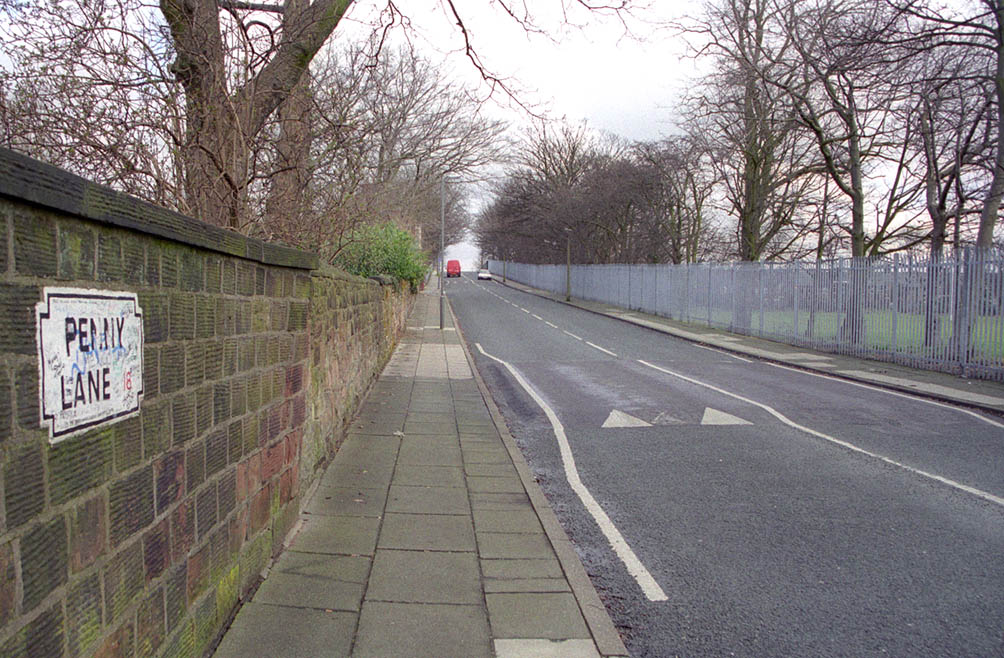
Penny Lane in Liverpool, where the sign has been painted onto the wall

With some of the more popular street names such as Liverpool's famous "Penny Lane", authorities gave up the practice of constantly replacing signs and simply resorted to painting the name of the street on the walls. Other jurisdictions offer replica street signs for sale as a legitimate alternative to theft. For route markers or mile markers that contain numbers with suggestive meanings, such as 69, 420, or 666, the number may be changed to avoid sign theft.

== Examples ==
=== Austria ===
- After frequent thefts of its welcome sign at the town boundary, the Austrian village of Fucking installed theft-resistant signs in 2005. The town changed its name to Fugging in 2021 after a vote in late 2020.

=== France ===
- Due to its reliance on right of way laws and traffic lights, the capital city, Paris, originally had only a single octagonal stop sign in the entire city, marking an otherwise unremarkable driveway. The sign is believed to have been repeatedly stolen as a souvenir until officials stopped replacing it.

=== Canada ===
- Ragged Ass Road in Yellowknife, Northwest Territories, Canada saw such frequent sign thefts that the city welded the sign to the post and began to sell replica street signs.
- De Grassi Street in Toronto has seen multiple sign thefts over the years because of its connection to the Degrassi teen television franchise. According to the Globe and Mail, twelve signs were stolen in 2000 alone.
- Street signs in the University District of Kingston, Ontario see frequent sign thefts by students. As many as 30 signs needed replacements at one point.

=== Ireland ===
- Signs are often stolen in Ireland for decorating the walls of Irish pubs around the world: places in County Kerry and sites associated with Michael Collins (such as Béal na Bláth or Clonakilty) are especially popular.

=== Germany ===
- Due to the heavy metal festival that is named after the place, the small hamlet of Wacken in Northern Germany had to deal with street sign theft.

=== The Netherlands ===
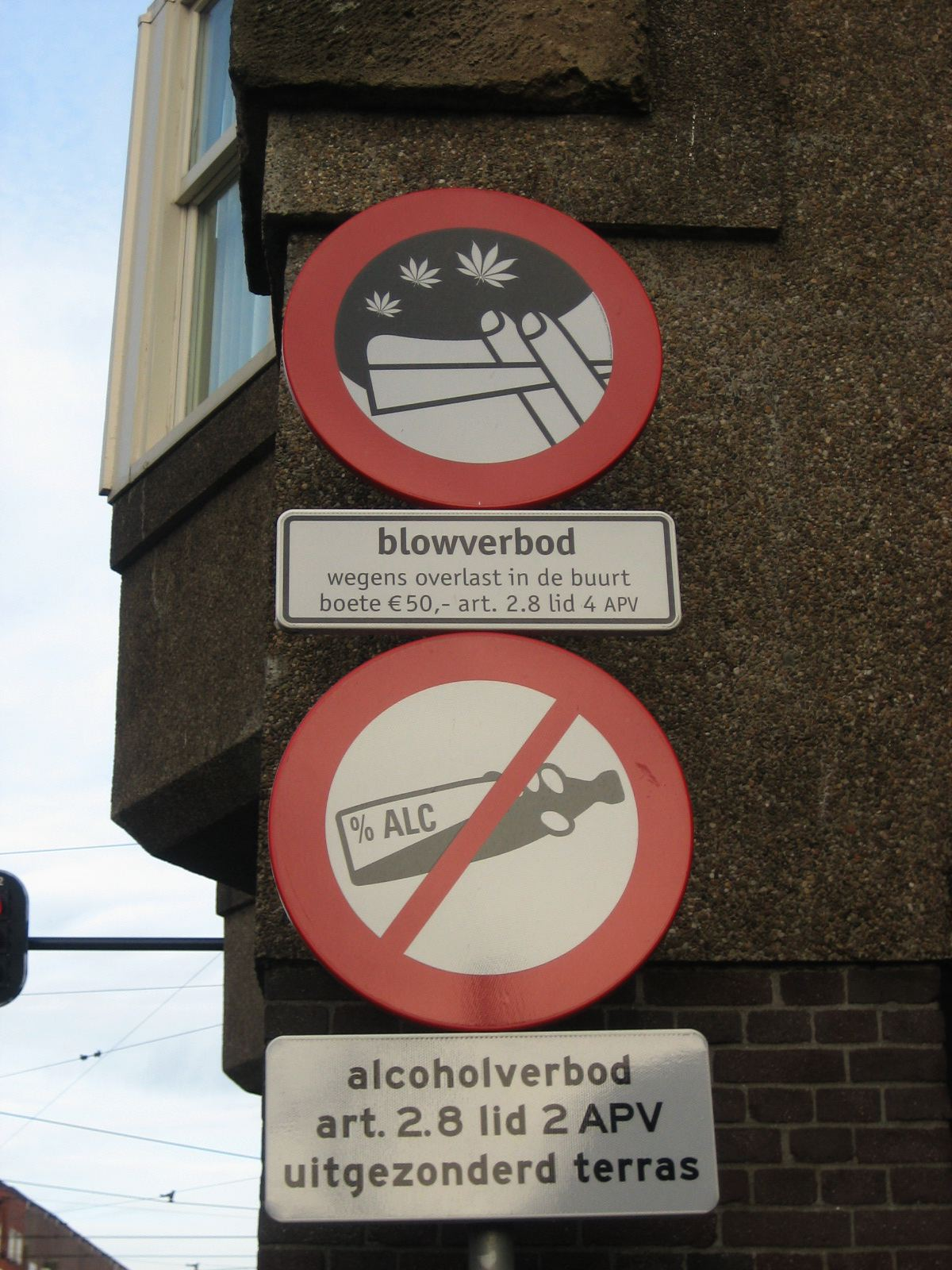
Signs prohibiting public consumption of cannabis in Amsterdam were frequent targets of theft.

- All the signs of the Dutch village Maaskantje were stolen since the New Kids comedy sketch show on Comedy Central (which is situated in the village) became popular (in the Netherlands, Belgium and Germany). The municipality of Maaskantje decided not to replace the stolen signs.
- In Amsterdam, signs prohibiting the consumption of cannabis were a frequent target of theft, prompting the city to offer replicas of the sign for sale.

=== Spain ===
- Leganés, Spain dedicated some streets to rock groups like AC/DC, Scorpions, Iron Maiden and Rosendo. The AC/DC sign was stolen days after inauguration. Leganés authorities now offer identical signs for sale.

=== Sweden ===
Swedish moose warning sign

- Sweden's distinctive warning sign for moose is noted for its tendency to be stolen, traditionally by German tourists.
- The sign "Grovare 6", pointing to the small village Grovare in Sweden, 6 km from the sign, was often stolen. "Grovare" means "rougher" in Swedish with slightly wrong grammar, and the number 6 is spelt "sex". The new sign says "Grovare 5", even though it is still 6 km.

=== United Kingdom ===
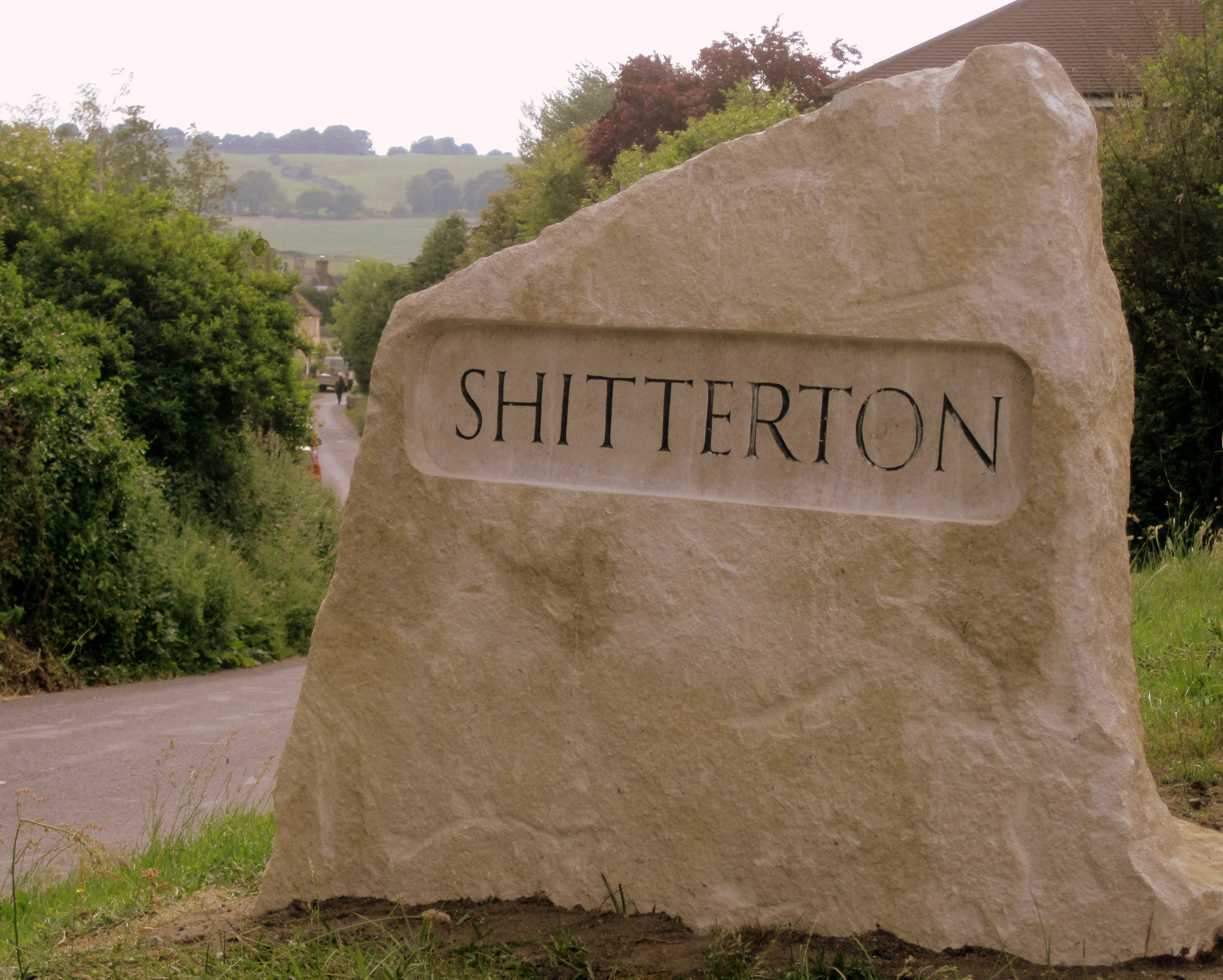
The residents of Shitterton, a small village in Dorset, England, collectively purchased this large stone sign to deter frequent theft.

- The signs on Abbey Road in London, England were often stolen by Beatles fans until the city council mounted them on buildings.
- Street signs on Butt Hole Road in Conisbrough, South Yorkshire were stolen. The street was renamed Archers Way in 2009.
- The village of Shitterton in Dorset saw its welcome sign stolen so often that in 2007 the local council stopped replacing it. The village's residents eventually contributed funds to buy a one-and-a-half-tonne stone slab with the town's name engraved on it as a permanent replacement.
- The signs on Dumb Woman's Lane, in Udimore, East Sussex, are sometimes stolen.
- Signs to the hamlet of Lost in Aberdeenshire have been repeatedly stolen. To deter theft, the council erected a sign in 2004 which had been welded to the post.

=== United States ===
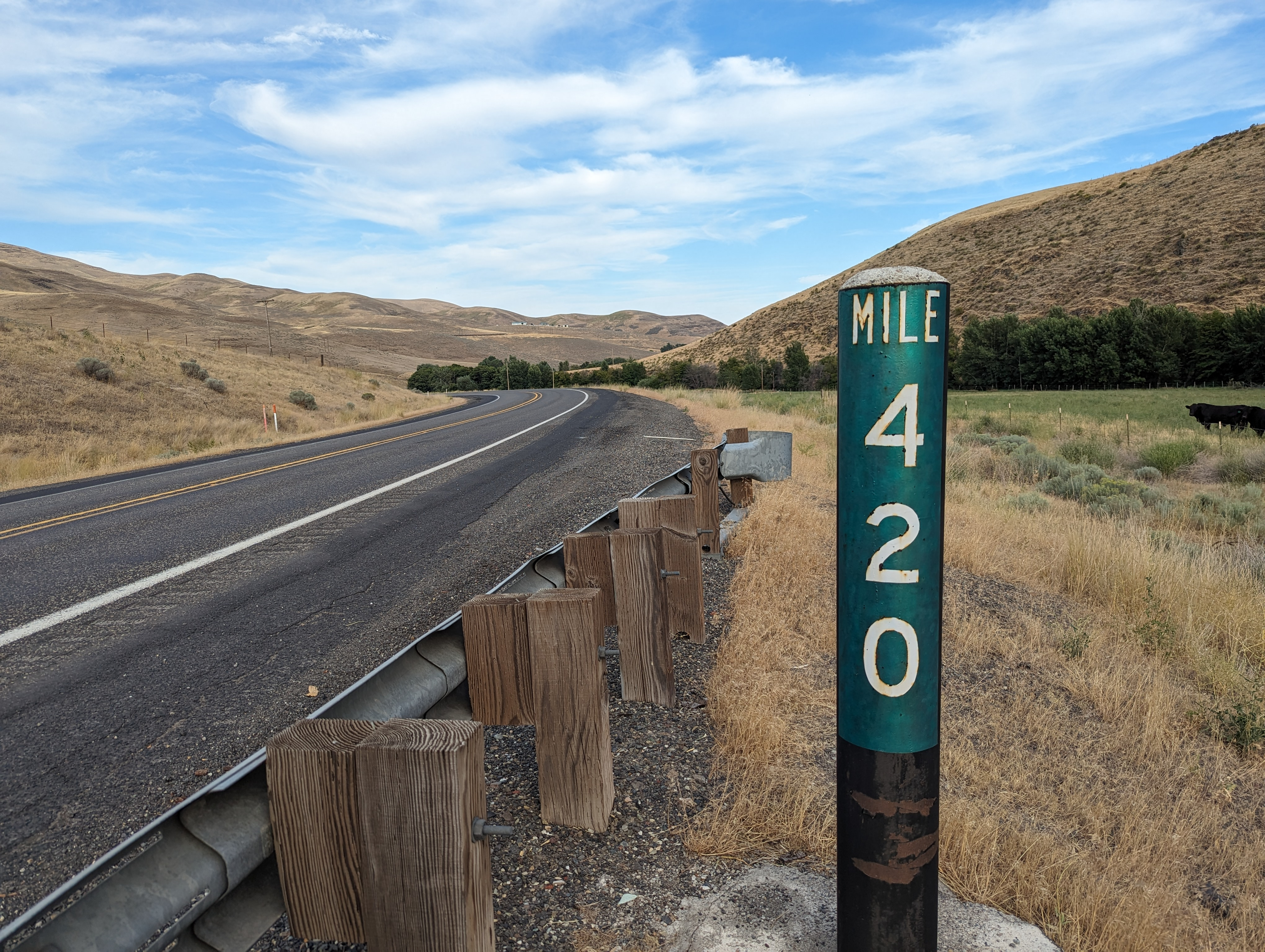
A milepost 420 on U.S. Route 12 in Washington that replaced a mile marker that was prone to theft

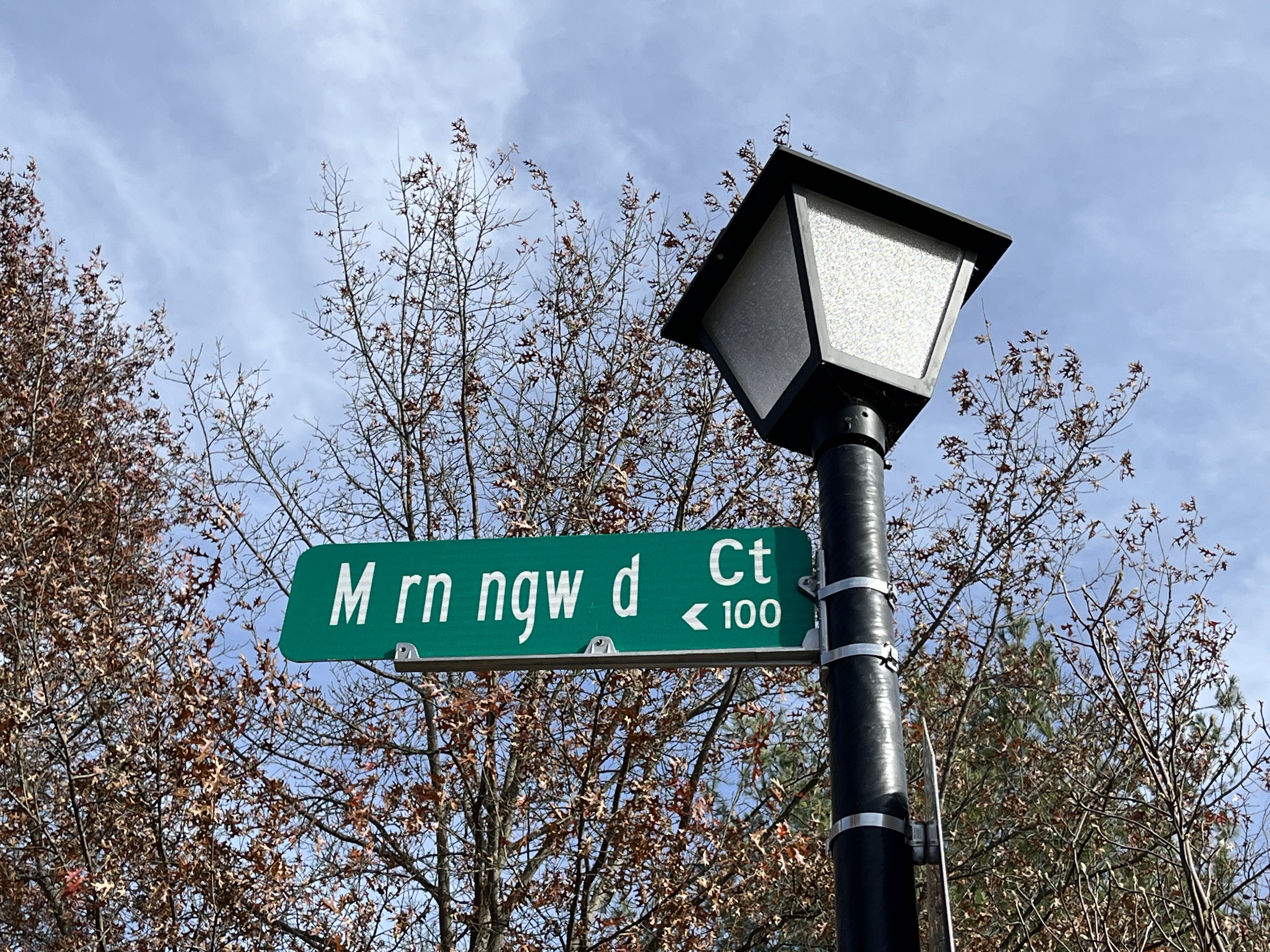
A street sign in Montgomery County, Maryland that has had its vowels removed to deter theft, rendering "Morningwood" as "M rn ngw d"

- The sign for South Park Street in Lawrence, Kansas has been stolen on several occasions, prompting the city to install theft-proof bolts on the sign.
- In Citrus Heights, California the signs for Garry Oak Drive have been frequently stolen by fans of Pokémon due to the street name being similar to the character Gary Oak.
- In 1988, Denver, Colorado began selling replica Corona Street signs after noting the signs were stolen by fans of the beer.
- Brickyard Road, Lakeside, Florida. Fans repeatedly stole the road sign because Lynyrd Skynyrd lead singer Ronnie Van Zant was living there before his death in 1977 and his brother, Johnny Van Zant, released an album and single called Brickyard Road in 1990. The county eventually erected a concrete pillar with the street name painted on it, as opposed to a traditional road sign.
- State, provincial or federal highways in many countries may face sign theft issues if their route number has popular culture connotations. Numbers especially prone to theft include 69 because of its use as a slang term for simultaneous oral sex, 420 because of its connection to marijuana culture, and 666 because of its association with the Biblical Number of the Beast. Six highways numbered 69 in the United States have been renumbered due to sign theft: in 1972, Route 69 in California was renumbered to Route 245; in 1967, Route 69 in New Jersey was renumbered to Route 31; in 1967, State Route 69 in Ohio was renumbered to Ohio State Route 235; in 1968, State Highway 69 in Texas was renumbered to State Highway 112; in 1992, State Highway 69 in South Carolina was renumbered to South Carolina Highway 65; and in 1981 and State Route 69 in Utah was renumbered to State Route 38 in 1994. In addition, officials in Oregon had originally planned to assign the Route 69 designation to the Beltline Highway in Eugene in 2002 but later chose to assign Oregon Route 569 to the route instead. However, Interstate 69 and U.S. Route 69 have not been altered. Sign theft was also a factor that led to the renumbering of U.S. Route 666 to U.S. Route 491 in 2003, with a majority of the US 666 signs stolen following the announcement of the renumbering. In addition, County Route 666 in Morris County, New Jersey was renumbered to County Route 665 due to sign theft.
- Signs for mile marker 66.6 on the New Jersey Turnpike and Garden State Parkway were frequently stolen, prompting officials to consider changing the mile marker to 66.61.
- Signs for mile marker 420 along Interstate 70 in Colorado were often stolen due to the marijuana reference, leading the Colorado Department of Transportation to change the mile marker to 419.99. The states of Washington, Idaho, North Carolina and Florida have also since begun implementing the same solution in response to incidents of "mile 420" sign theft. Idaho replaced mile marker 420 along U.S. Route 95 with 419.9, which is also now used on Interstate 75 in Florida and Interstate 40 in North Carolina.
- Richard Bong State Recreation Area, a state park in Wisconsin, also suffers from sign theft due to the association of the word "bong" with marijuana culture.
- U.S. Route 66 in the United States, the subject of a 1940s pop song, also sees frequent sign theft – signs are so often stolen that in some places it can be difficult to navigate without knowing the route; furthermore, US 66 signage has not been maintained since the route was decommissioned from the U.S. Highway System in 1985. Instead, some localities rely on route shield pavement markings, which cannot be stolen, to indicate the path of the historic route.
- Often in the United States and Canada, the sign for streets called "High St." are stolen, also for its connection to marijuana culture. In an episode of the TV series That '70s Show, several of the characters attempt to steal a High St. sign to give to Steven Hyde for his birthday. This is less common in the United Kingdom, as the term "High Street" is a general term for a town's main shopping district, equivalent to Main Street in North America.
- In the southernmost urbanized portion of Anchorage, Alaska, near the Seward Highway, a neighborhood street was called Jackass Lane. The sign at its intersection with Huffman Road, a major thoroughfare in Anchorage, was stolen so frequently during the 1970s and 1980s that the city government renamed the street to Silver Fox Lane.
- Signs leading to Bolinas, California were often stolen or wrongly placed by its reclusive residents as a means to make it difficult for tourists to locate the beachside town.
- The entry sign in Intercourse, Pennsylvania has been stolen or vandalized on more than one occasion.
- In the early 1990s, during the popularity of the movie Batman Returns, many signs that said "Bat Cave Fire District" were stolen around the town of Bat Cave, North Carolina. So many signs were taken that the local volunteer fire department stopped putting them back up.
- The sign for Blue Jay Way is said to be the most-stolen street sign in Los Angeles, because of its association with the Beatles song written by George Harrison. The city eventually gave up on a metal sign and painted the street's name on the curb.
- Climax and Hell, Michigan see frequent street thefts due to their names.
- Reassurance markers for highway M-22 in Michigan. The highway is nationally popular for its scenery, taking drivers around the Leelanau Peninsula and eastern shore of Lake Michigan. It also runs along the Sleeping Bear Dunes National Lakeshore, named the "Most Beautiful Place in America" by ABC News. A local kiteboarding company also released a line of merchandise with the highway marker on it, branding them as "M-22". Signs along M-22 have been repeatedly stolen since 2003. The Michigan Department of Transportation has replaced stolen signs without the letter "M" on it.
- To discourage frequent theft of signs for Harry Baals Drive in Fort Wayne, Indiana, replacement signs now read "H. W. Baals Dr". In 2011, civic leaders also rejected a popular proposal to name a new government building after the former mayor.
- In the small towns of Embden and New Portland, Maine, the sign for a street named Katie Crotch Road has been stolen numerous times. Residents of Embden have voted on the issue of changing the street's name to Cadie Road multiple times, including in 2016, where the motion was denied, as it had been in previous years.
- In Cleveland, Ohio the recently renamed "Bone Thugs-N-Harmony Way" sign was stolen shortly after it was installed.
- In 2019, officials in Montgomery County, Maryland attempted to discourage street sign theft by removing the vowels from several frequently stolen signs throughout the county. Affected signs included "Stoner Drive", "Blunt Road", "Morningwood Drive", and "Terrapin Drive".
- In 2019, seven stop signs were stolen in Washington Township, Pennsylvania.

== See also ==
- Manhole cover theft
- Street name controversy
- Traffic cone
