= Fugging, Lower Austria =

Fugging Fucking
- Village
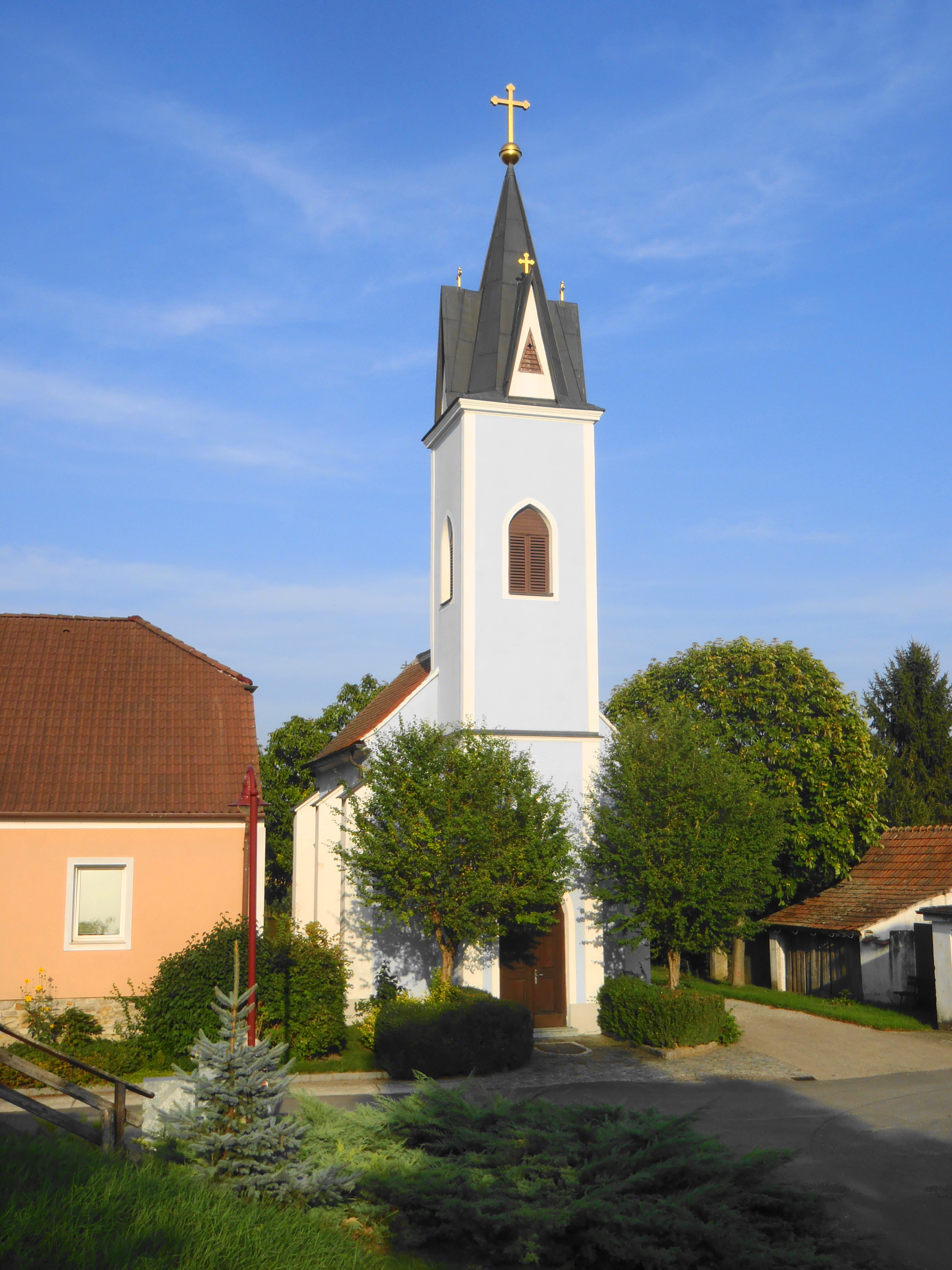

- Location within Austria
- Coordinates: 48°17′26.45″N 15°37′33.088″E
- Country: Austria
- State: Lower Austria
- District: Sankt Pölten-Land
- Municipality: Obritzberg-Rust

Population (1 January 2023)
  - Total: 92

Fugging (German: [ˈfʊɡɪŋ]) is a village in the municipality of Obritzberg-Rust, Sankt Pölten-Land, Austria. It is located in the state of Lower Austria and was known as Fucking until 1836.

== History of name ==
Fugging was first referred to as Fucking in 1195 in a local monastery's parish records. Its name was later changed from Fucking to Fugging for an unknown reason c. 1836. While it is not known why the village's name was changed, it has been speculated by its current mayor that because Fugging is closer to Vienna than the other village of Fucking is, it would have likely had more English-speaking visitors who might have raised questions regarding its name. The village's placename signs are firmly mounted to prevent street sign theft.

In 2012, there were reports that the village of Fucking in Upper Austria attempted to change its name to Fugging through a referendum after receiving large amounts of prank phone calls from English speakers about the village's name. According to these reports, they were unable to do so because Fugging in Lower Austria was already so named; Fugging mayor Andreas Dockner said that "We think one Fugging in Austria is enough". However, Franz Meindl, the mayor of Fucking, rejected the claim that his town was planning on changing its name: "This was discussed a few years ago but nothing came of it. It is certainly not under discussion now." However, in November 2020, the Tarsdorf council voted to change the Upper Austrian village's name to Fugging, effective on 1 January 2021. Both villages' names are derived from Focko, a Bavarian noble from the sixth century.

== Facilities ==
Fugging has a village church that was built in 1894 and consecrated in 1896. It was later renovated in 1984 after the roof required repair work after damage from persistent hailstorms. Fugging also has a small volunteer fire department located within it.
