= Sankt Marienkirchen bei Schärding =

- Municipality
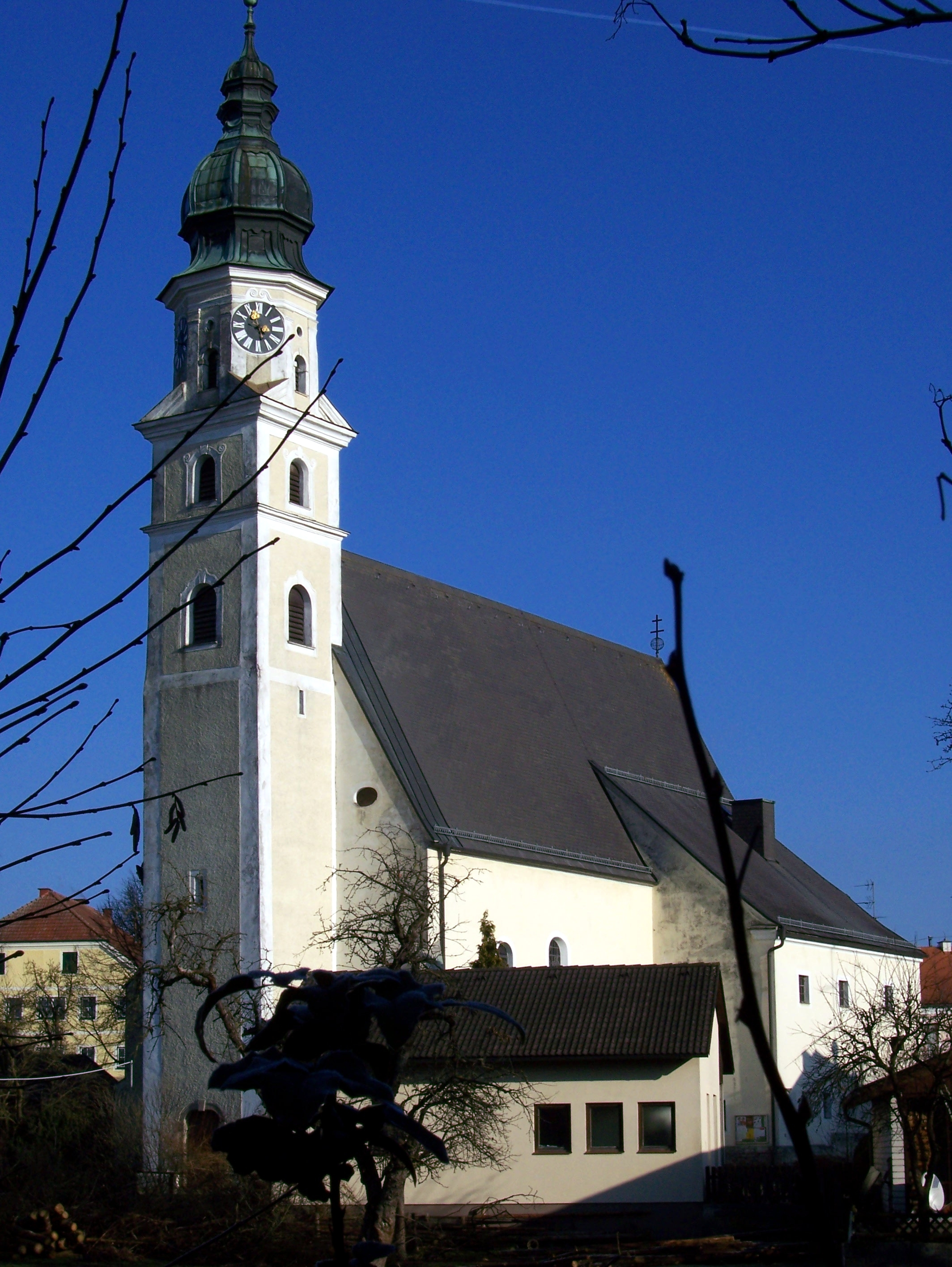

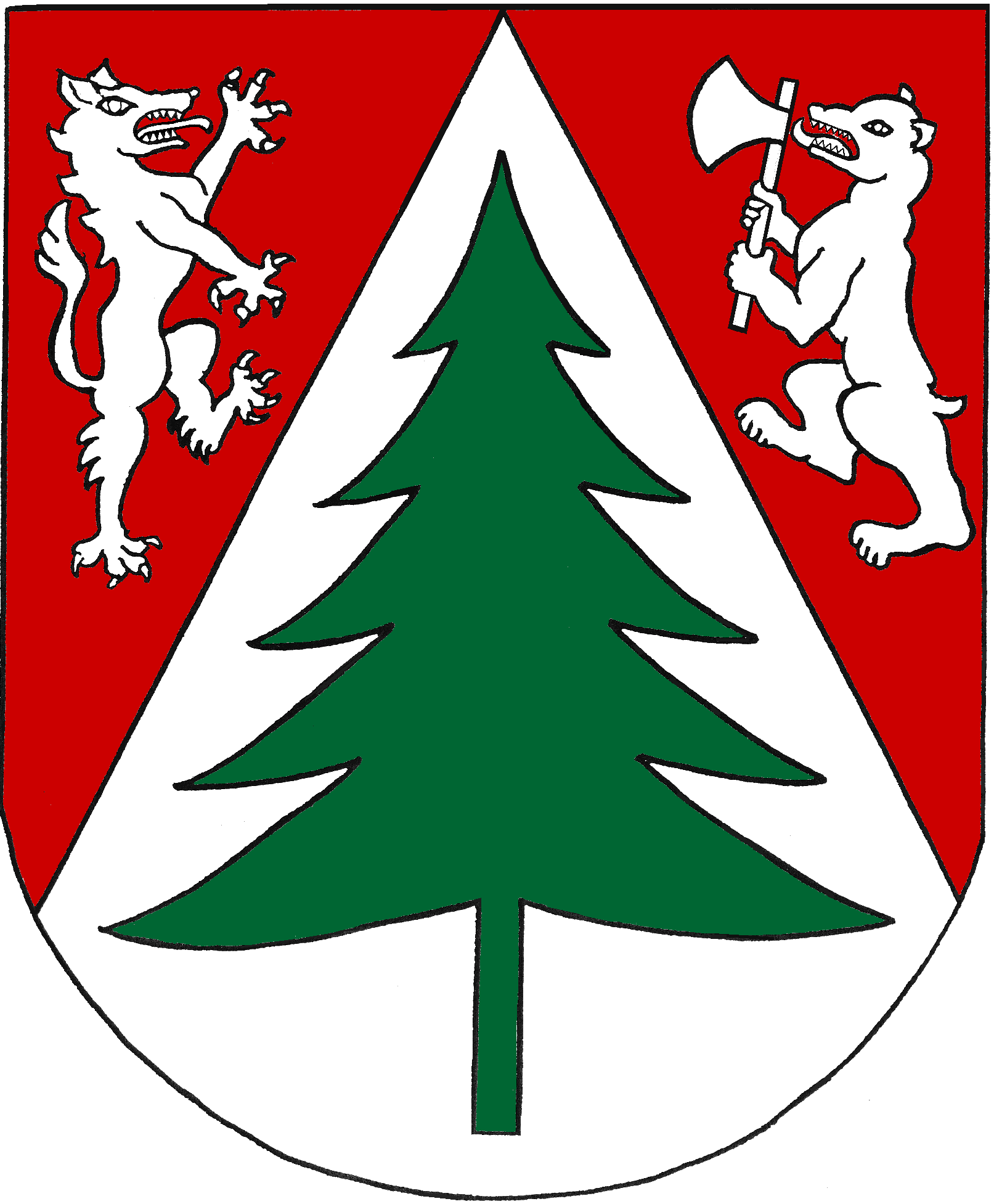
- Coat of arms

- Location within Austria
- Coordinates: 48°23′00″N 13°27′00″E
- Country: Austria
- State: Upper Austria
- District: Schärding

Government
  - Mayor: Bernhard Fischer (ÖVP)

Area
  - Total: 24.93 km^{2} (9.63 sq mi)
- Elevation: 338 m (1,109 ft)

Population (2018-01-01)
  - Total: 1,832
  - Density: 73.49/km^{2} (190.3/sq mi)
- Time zone: UTC+1 (CET)
  - Summer (DST): UTC+2 (CEST)
- Postal code: 4774
- Area code: 07711
- Vehicle registration: SD
- Website: www.st-marienkirchen.at

Sankt Marienkirchen bei Schärding (German for "St. Mary's Church near Schärding") is a municipality in the district of Schärding in the Austrian state of Upper Austria.

== Geography and Towns ==
Sankt Marienkirchen lies in the Innviertel. About 9 percent of the municipality is forest and 74 percent is farmland.

Sankt Marienkirchen has two famous towns known for their name which is similar to the expletive fuck, both named Oberfucking (sometimes Overfucking) and Unterfucking (sometimes Underfucking).
