= Shitterton =

Hamlet in Dorset, England

Coordinates: 50.7547°N 2.2279°W

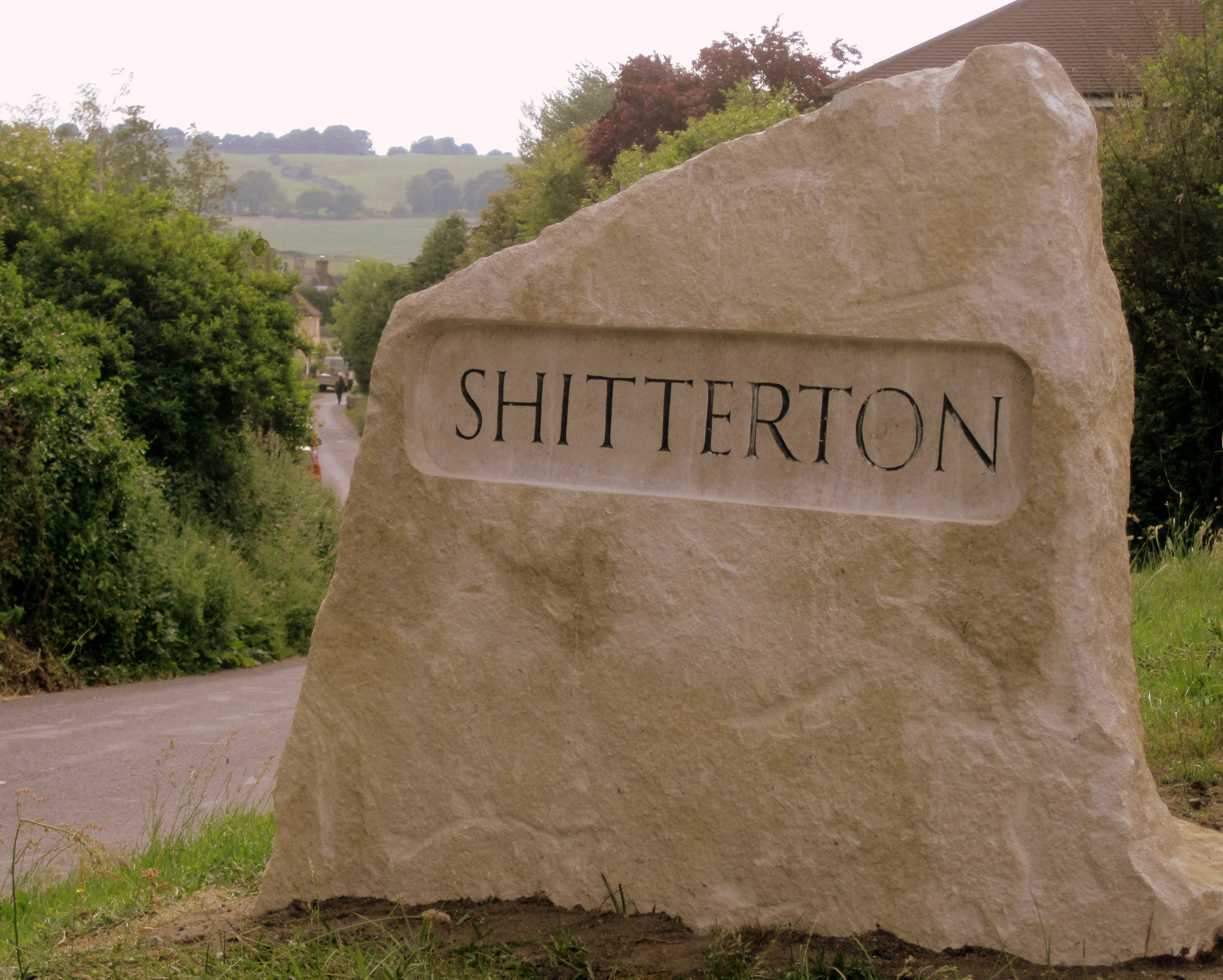
- Shitterton sign, carved from Purbeck stone, and designed to be theft-proof

- Location within Dorset
- OS grid reference: SY840950
- Civil parish: Bere Regis
- Unitary authority: Dorset
- Ceremonial county: Dorset
- Region: South West
- Country: England
- Sovereign state: United Kingdom
- Post town: WAREHAM
- Postcode district: BH20
- Dialling code: 01929
- Police: Dorset
- Fire: Dorset and Wiltshire
- Ambulance: South Western
- UK Parliament: Mid Dorset & North Poole

Shitterton /ˈʃɪtərtən/ is a hamlet in Bere Regis, Dorset, England. It includes a collection of historic thatched buildings dating back to the 18th century and earlier. Its name dates back at least to the eleventh century and means "farmstead on the stream used as an open sewer". Shitterton has frequently been noted on lists of unusual place names because it has the English profanity "shit" in its name.

== Location ==
Traditional thatched cottages, Shitterton

Shitterton is at the western edge of the village of Bere Regis in the Dorset district of Dorset, England, near the junction of the A31 and A35 trunk roads halfway between Poole and Dorchester. The hamlet has about 50 households. Because it was protected by the Bere River from the fires that have ravaged Bere Regis over the years (most notably in 1788), Shitterton retains an extensive selection of older, predominantly thatched, buildings. Nikolaus Pevsner describes the hamlet as "the best part" of Bere Regis, with its buildings forming "[their] own little street" leading up to the 18th-century thatched Shitterton Farm.

== Name ==
The unusual name of the hamlet dates back at least 1,000 years to Anglo-Saxon times. It was recorded in the Domesday Book of 1086 as Scatera or Scetra, a Norman French rendering of an Old English name derived from the word scite, meaning dung. This word became schitte in Middle English and shit in modern English. The name alludes to the stream that bisects the hamlet, which appears to have been called the Shiter or Shitter, or "brook used as a privy". The place-name therefore means something along the lines of "farmstead on the stream used as an open sewer". It has been recorded in a number of variants over the centuries, including Schitereston (1285), Shyterton (1332), Chiterton (1456) and Shetterton (1687). During the 19th century, Victorians attempted to rename the hamlet as Sitterton. The name did not stick, though it lingers on in a few house and road names such as Sitterton Close and Sitterton House. It is not the only place-name in Britain that starts with Shit- – Shittlehope and Shitlington Crags also exist, located in County Durham and Northumberland respectively – but it appears to be the only one to actually be named after faeces.

The stream which passes near the village flows into the River Piddle (also called River Trent). Piddle is another name for urine. Shitterton is located very close to a village known as Piddletown until recently, when it was renamed Puddletown.

In 2012, Shitterton was voted "Britain's worst place-name" in a survey carried out by genealogy website Find My Past, beating Scratchy Bottom, also in Dorset, and Brokenwind in Aberdeenshire. It was also awarded ninth place on the list of place-names in Rude Britain: The 100 Rudest Place Names in Britain. The native Shittertonians are, however, proud of their hamlet's name. Ian Ventham, the chairman of the parish council, said: "It is a perfect rural hamlet with thatched cottages and idyllic Dorset countryside. Those of us who live here are not the least bit embarrassed by it."

== Repeatedly stolen sign ==
An earlier sign, before it was stolen

The hamlet's name has resulted in its sign repeatedly being stolen, a fate similar to that of Fugging (formerly Fucking), Upper Austria. Each theft required a costly replacement to be acquired, to the increasing reluctance of the local council. As Ian Ventham, chairman of Bere Regis Parish Council, put it:

Every two or three years somebody comes along and nicks our sign because, clearly, Shitterton is amusing. We think it was kids who would like to have it stuck on the wall in a den somewhere. I don't think it was malicious, they just did it for fun, but it was exasperating for us. We would get a nice new shiny sign from the council and five minutes later, it was gone.

In 2010, the inhabitants banded together to purchase a 1.5-tonne block of Purbeck stone to place at the entrance to Shitterton, carved with the hamlet's name. More than half of the 50 households contributed £20 each and a further £70 was contributed by Purbeck District Council. A truck and crane were hired by volunteers to put the stone in place, at a total cost of £680. Ian Ventham explained: "We thought, 'Let's put in a tonne and a half of stone and see them try and take that away in the back of a Ford Fiesta'."

== See also ==
- Place names considered unusual
