= Fugging, Upper Austria =

Village in Upper Austria

Fugging Fucking
- Village
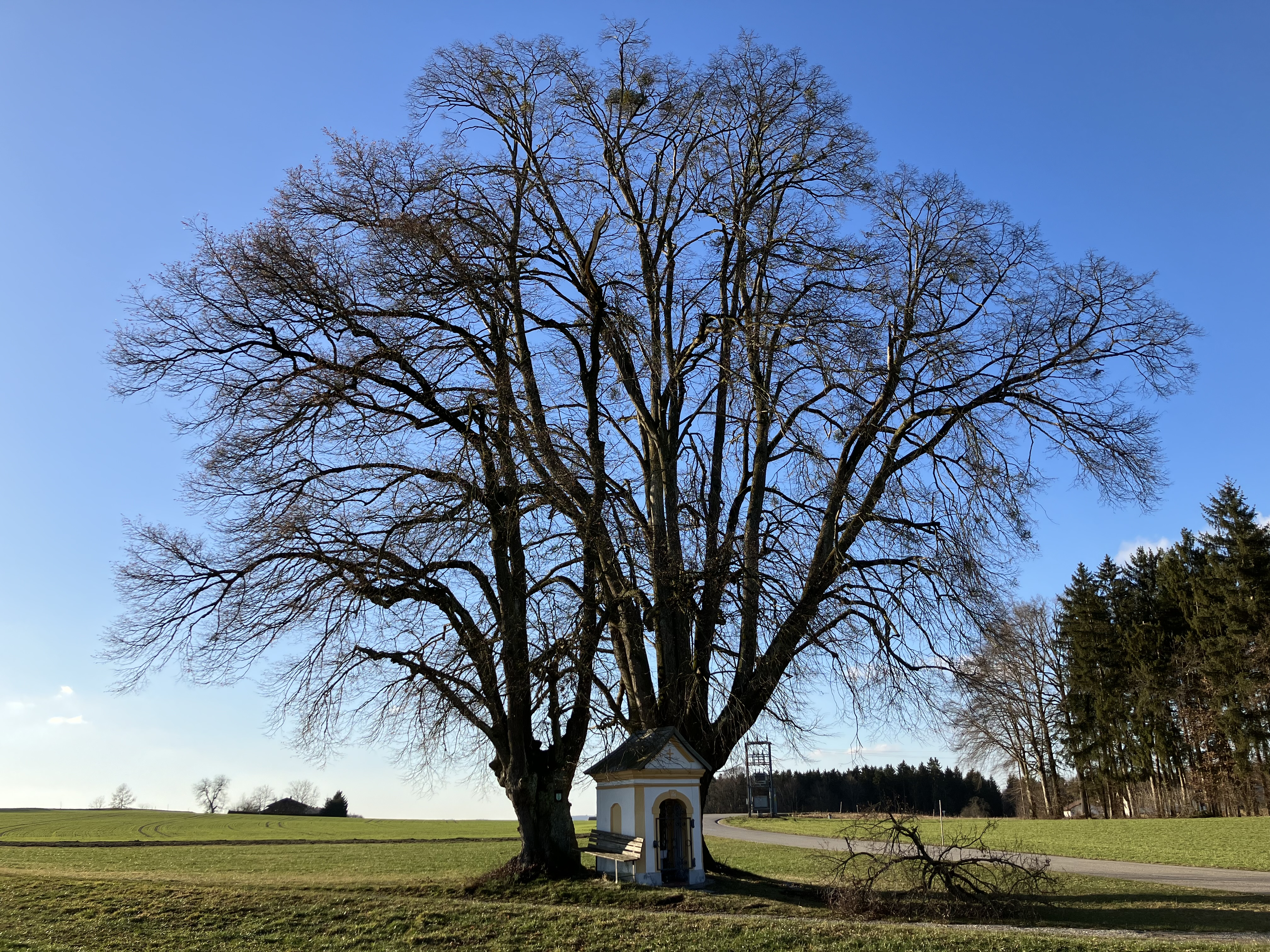
- Two linden trees with statuses of natural monuments, and a small chapel, in Fugging

- Location in Austria, 4 kilometers from the German border
- Coordinates: 48°04′02″N 12°51′49″E
- Country: Austria
- State: Upper Austria
- Region: Innviertel
- Municipality: Tarsdorf

Population (2020)
  - Total: 106
- Time zone: UTC+1 (CET)
  - Summer (DST): UTC+2 (CEST)
- Postal code: 5121 Tarsdorf
- Area code: 07940
- Licence plate: BR

Fugging (German: [ˈfʊɡɪŋ]), spelt Fucking until 2021, is an Austrian village in the municipality of Tarsdorf, located in the Innviertel region of western Upper Austria. It is 33 km (21 mi) north of Salzburg and 4 km (2.5 mi) east of the Inn river, which forms part of the German border.

Despite a population of only 106 in 2020, the village has drawn attention in the English-speaking world for its former name, which was spelled the same as an inflected form of the vulgar English-language profanity fuck. Its road signs were a popular visitor attraction and were often stolen by souvenir-hunting vandals until 2005, when they were modified to be theft-resistant. A campaign to change the village's name to Fugging was rejected in 2004 but succeeded in late 2020.

== Former name and etymology ==
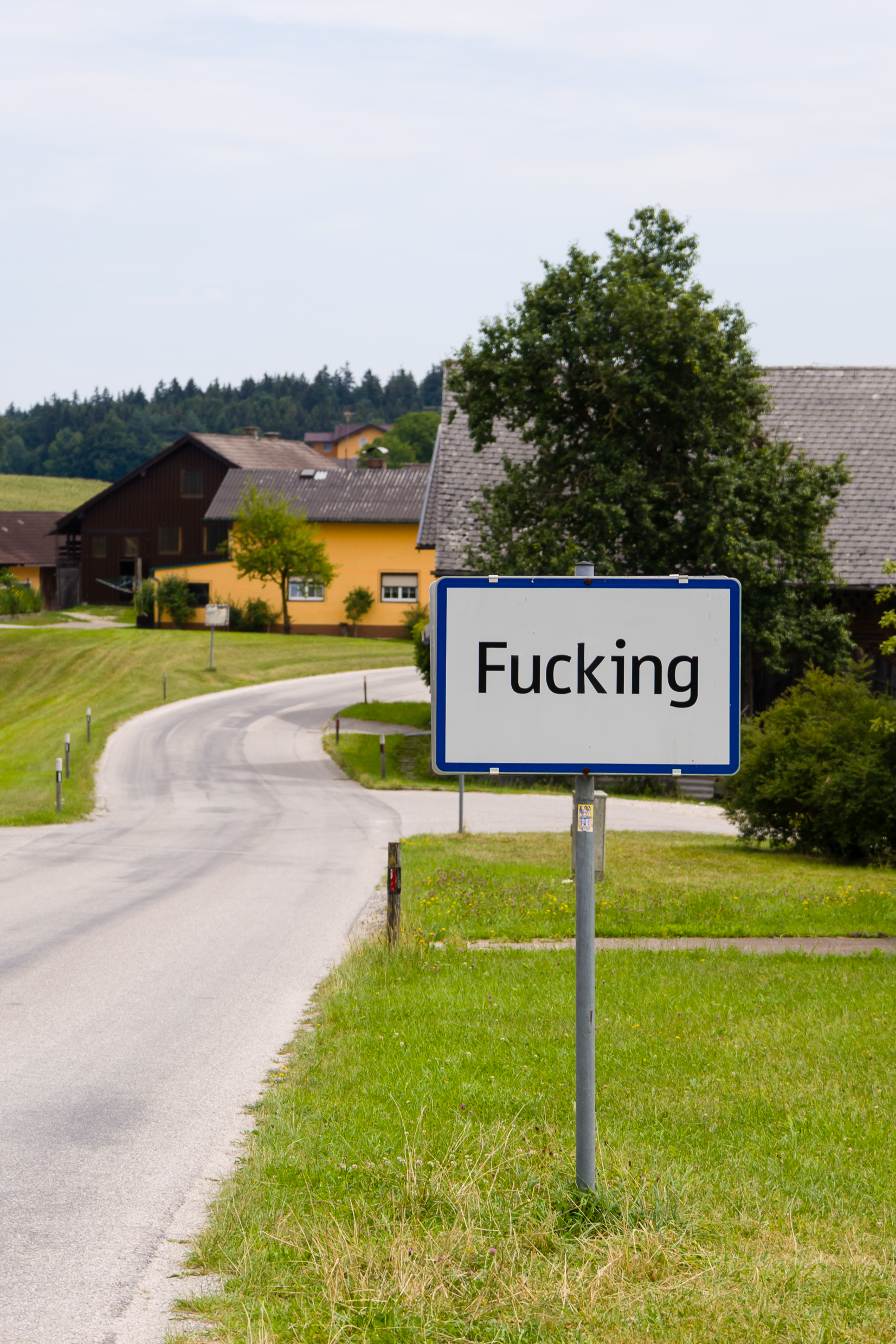
The village of Fucking in August 2015, with the frequently-stolen traffic sign before the name change

The settlement is believed to have been founded in the 6th century AD by Focko, a Bavarian nobleman. The Austrian region during this century was mostly under the domain of the Kingdom of the Ostrogoths and was populated by a mix of Christians and pagans. The existence of the village was documented for the first time in 1070, and historical records show that some 20 years later, the lord was recorded in Latin as Adalpertus de Fucingin. The spelling of the name, which is pronounced with the English language vowel oo as in book, evolved over the years; it is first recorded in historical sources as Vucchingen in 1070, as Fukching in 1303, as Fugkhing in 1532, and in the modern spelling Fucking in the 18th century. The ending -ing is an old Germanic suffix indicating the people belonging to the root word to which it is attached, thus Fucking means "(place of) Focko's people".

== Demographics ==
The Austrian census of 2020 recorded that the village had a population of 106. The Age reported in 2005 that it had 104 inhabitants and 32 houses.

== Popularity and notoriety ==
Fugging is best known for the four traffic signs at the entrances to the village, beside which many English-speaking tourists have had their photograph taken because of its former name of "Fucking". British and United States soldiers based in nearby Salzburg noticed the name after World War II and began to travel to the village to have their photos taken beside the signs. The local residents were bemused, as they had not previously been aware of the meaning of their village's name in English. During the second half of the 20th century and the early 21st century, the number of tourists visiting the village increased, including the occasional tour bus.

Street map of Fugging

The village is especially popular with British tourists; as a local tour guide explained: "The Germans all want to see Mozart's house in Salzburg; the Americans want to see where The Sound of Music was filmed; the Japanese want Hitler's birthplace in Braunau; but for the British, it's all about Fucking." Augustina Lindlbauer, the manager of an area guesthouse, said that the area had lakes, forests, and vistas worth visiting, but there was an "obsession with Fucking", and she had to explain to a British tourist "that there were no Fucking postcards". The English meaning of its name also resulted in the village being the butt of jokes in popular media. The Grand Tour featured the village in the 2017 episode "[censored] to [censored]", as part of a road trip from Wank via Kissing, Petting, and Fucking to Wedding. In 2019, Norwegian broadcasting company NRK Sport produced a comedic tourism video on Fucking. Released on YouTube, the video consists of the reporter and the former Melodi Grand Prix Junior presenter Nicolay Ramm both advertising the village's attractions and listing off a large number of double entendres based on its name.

The road signs were commonly stolen as souvenirs, and cost some 300 euros to replace. In 2005, theft-resistant welded signs were installed, secured in concrete. The mayor of Tarsdorf said that tourists were still welcome, though the local police chief emphasised that "we will not stand for the Fucking signs being removed. It may be very amusing for you British, but Fucking is simply Fucking to us. What is this big Fucking joke? It is puerile." One resident set up a website selling T-shirts featuring the signs, with the slogan "I like Fucking in Austria", but shut it down after other residents disapproved.

In 2009, the village said it would install surveillance cameras to deter tourists from continuing to attempt to steal the road signs. Many methods were taken, which include screwing the signs to pedestals without much success. The mayor said that he would prefer not to see the village featured in the press anymore: "Just leave us alone".

In the same year, the European Union's Office for Harmonization in the Internal Market trademarks agency forbade a German brewery to market a beer called "Fucking Hell". The brewery successfully argued that "hell" in German means "pale" and that the beer is named after the town of Fucking; permission for the name was granted in January 2010. (The second part of the name is the German term for a pale lager, Hell.)

== Name change ==
A 2004 vote on changing the village's name failed. "Everyone here knows what it means in English, but for us Fucking is Fucking—and it's going to stay Fucking," said the mayor as he pointed out that the name had been Fucking for 800 years.

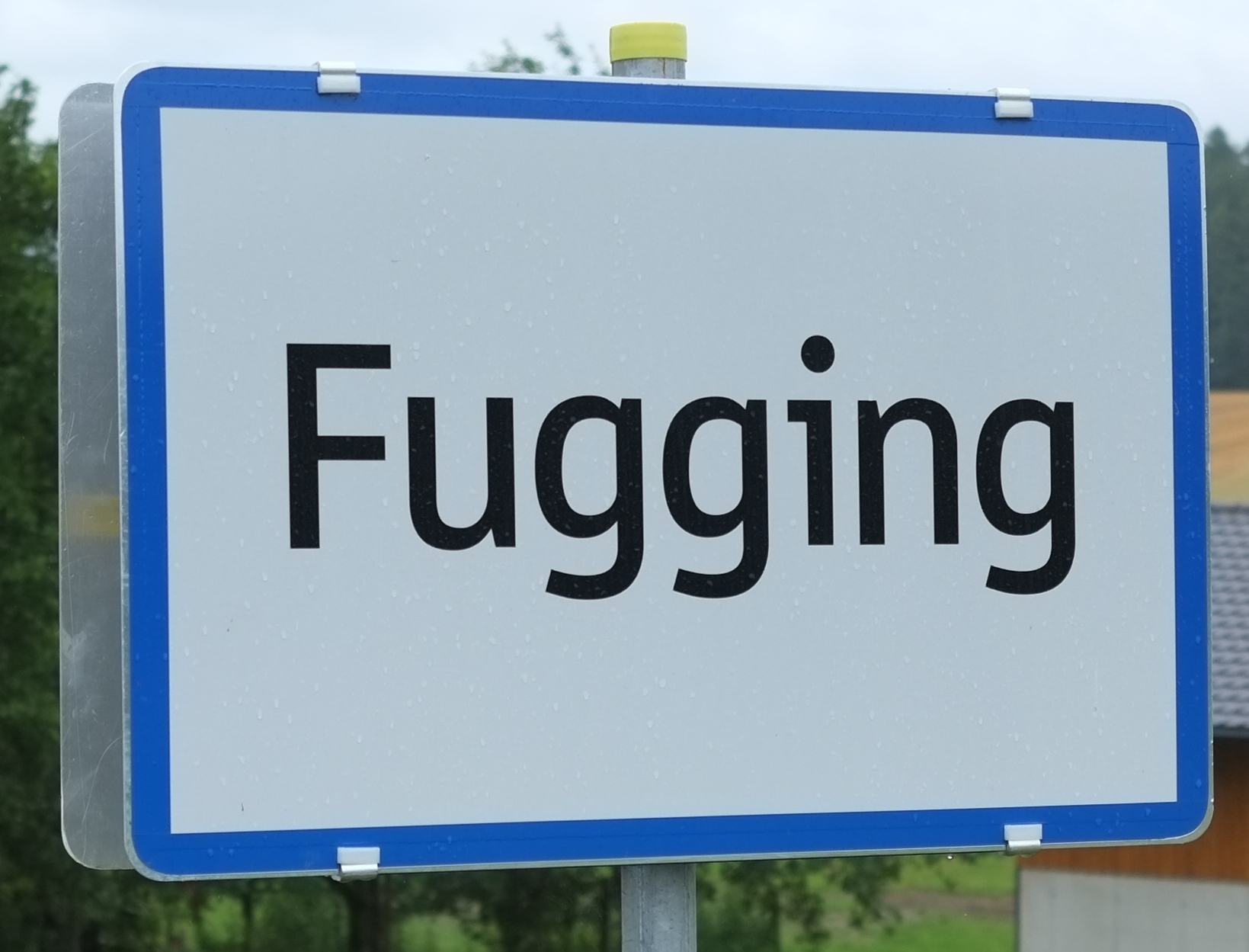
The updated sign

In April 2012, rumours spread through international media that villagers had been thinking about changing the name of the village or had actually voted to change it. The satirical website The Spoof! published a story that was expanded in the British tabloid the Daily Mirror. The story was then reported elsewhere as news, including by The Guardian and The Huffington Post, who said that a vote had taken place to change the name to Fugging, but it was discovered that a village with that name already existed in the municipality of Obritzberg-Rust just west of Herzogenburg. The mayor denied these rumours.

The council of Tarsdorf voted in their 17 November 2020 session to have the village's name officially changed to Fugging, effective 1 January 2021. A video by Danish YouTuber Albert Dyrlund, which drew attention to the village's peculiar name, was reportedly stated as being the reason for the name change. Nearly 29,000 people visited the village following the release of the video, disrupting local residents with the excessive filming and trespassing of local property, such as the village's elementary school and residents' homes. The following month, signs with the new name were vandalised to read "Fucking". One of the last remaining signs with the old name was given to the Haus der Geschichte Österreich in Vienna. In September 2021, village mayor Andrea Holzner stated that the disruptions had ceased, and that the name change had the intended effect.

According to The Guardian, the villagers were tired of mockery and being called "fuckingers" by the high amounts of tourists; others said that they would miss their international fame that came from the offensive sign.

== Film ==
Bad Fucking, a 2011 satirical mystery novel by the Austrian director and novelist Kurt Palm, is set in a slightly renamed Fucking; it won the Friedrich Glauser Prize and was filmed in 2013 by Harald Sicheritz.

== See also ==
- Place names considered unusual
- Oberfucking
- Unterfucking
- Shitterton, a hamlet in Dorset, England, with a similar history of sign theft
- Šukačka, settlement in the Czech Republic that is slang for "fucking"
- Um Dafuq, town in Sudan
- Bitche, a canton and town on the French-German border
- Fuckersberg, another town in Upper Austria
