= Highway shield =

Sign denoting the route number of a highway

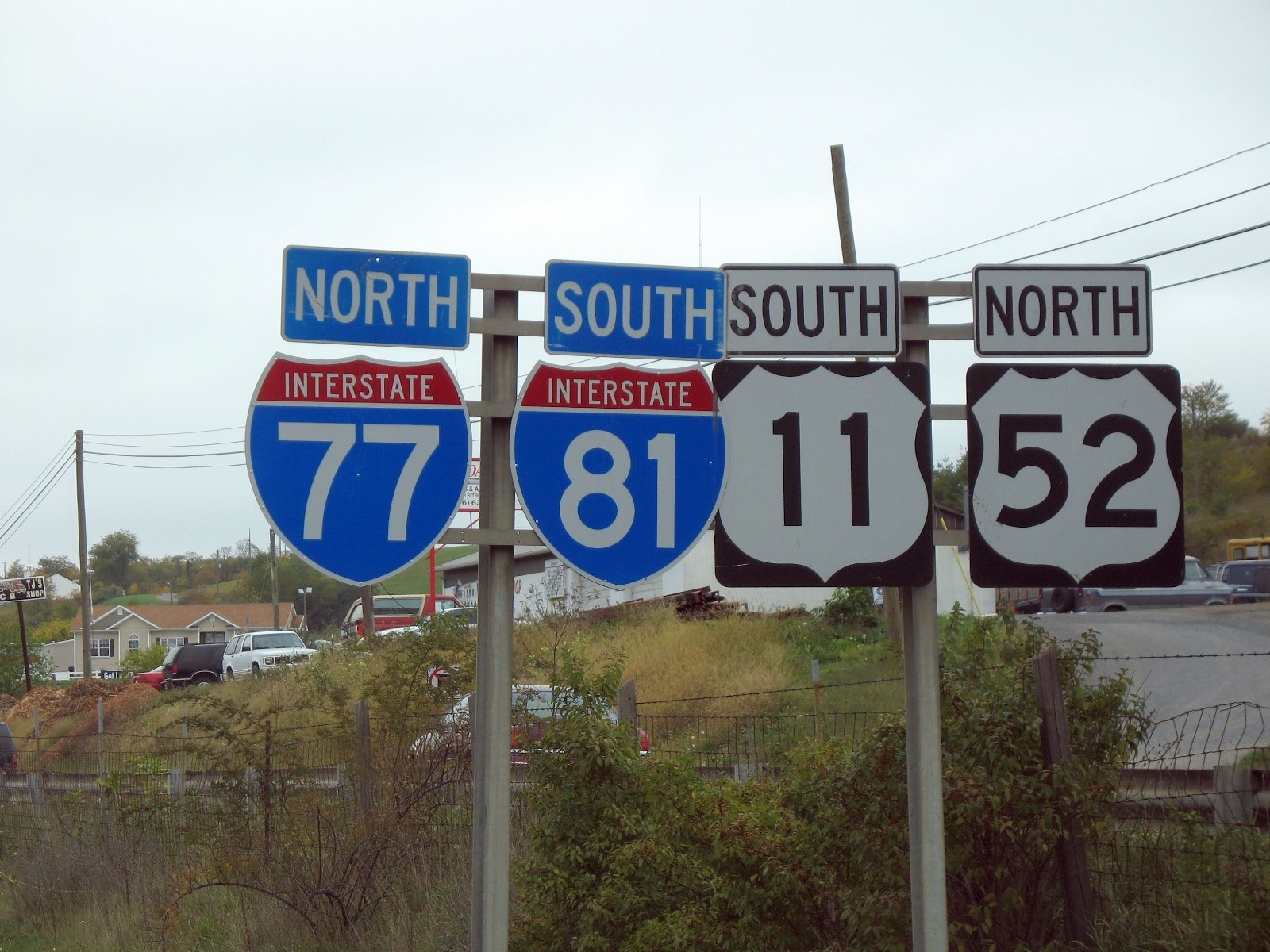
The shields for Interstate highways (left) and U.S. routes (right) can be seen on this set of reassurance markers in Southwest Virginia indicating two sets of wrong-way concurrencies

A highway shield or route marker is a sign denoting the route number of a highway, usually in the form of a symbolic shape with the route number enclosed. As the focus of the sign, the route number is usually the sign's largest element, with other items on the sign rendered in smaller sizes or contrasting colors. Highway shields are used by travellers, commuters, and all levels of government for identifying, navigating, and organising routes within a given jurisdiction. Simplified highway shields often appear on maps.

== Purposes ==
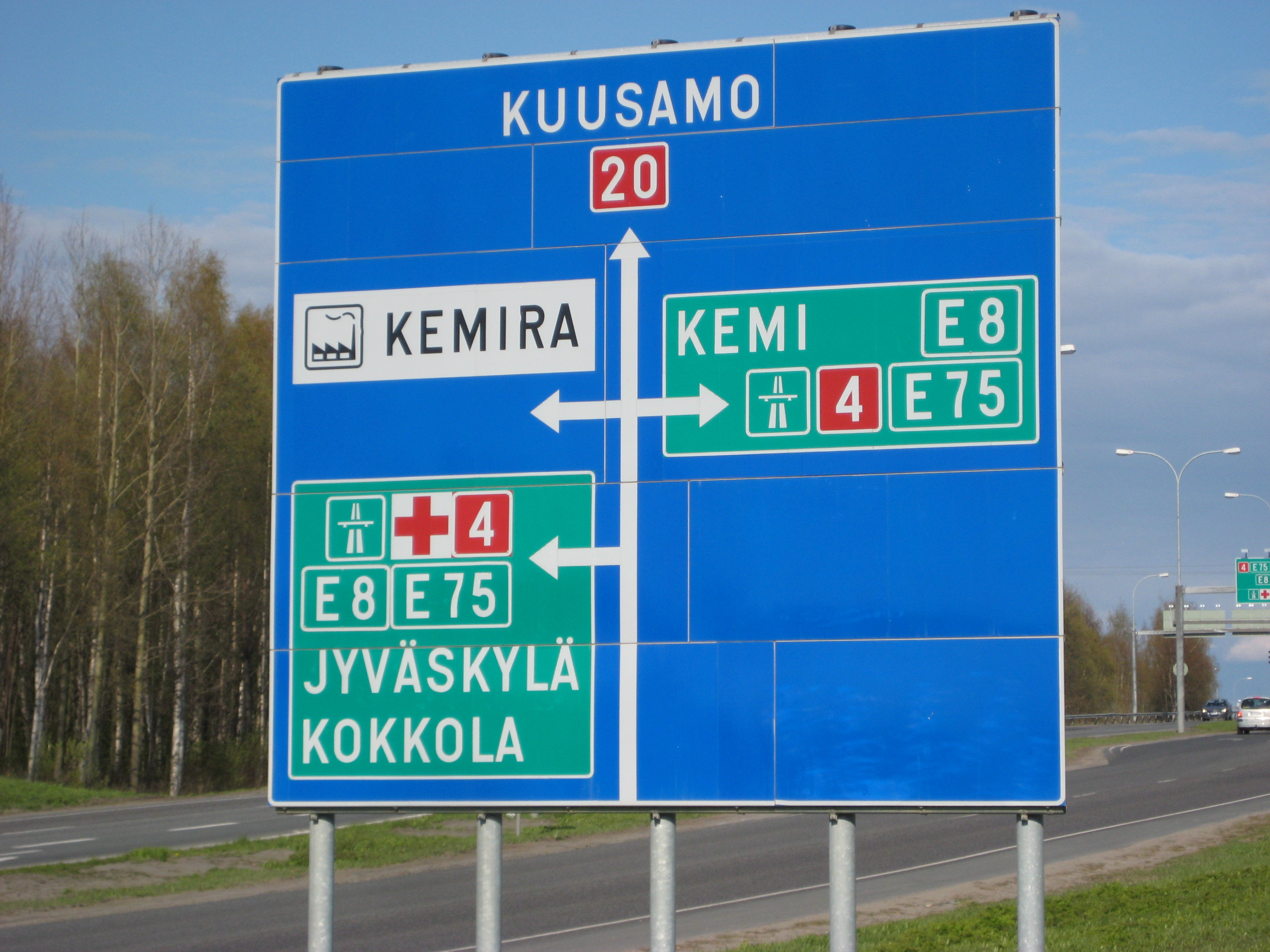
The advance sign for the junction with the highway 4 (E8/E75) on the highway 20 in Oulu, Finland, looking east.

There are several distinct uses for the highway shield:

- Junction signs inform travelers that they are approaching an intersection with a numbered highway.
- Guide signs inform travelers which way to go at intersections, usually with an arrow pointing the way. These include:
  - Directional assemblies, which combine highway shields with separate cardinal direction signs and arrow signs on the same post, and
  - Direction, position, or indication signs, which include highway shields as part of the sign legend.
- Reassurance markers are used after major junctions and periodically in between to confirm the route and direction.
- Trailblazer assemblies are posted on other roadways to "blaze the trail" to the highway in question, usually with a "TO" banner plate above the shield
- Some jurisdictions place highway shields on highway location markers (kilometre or mile markers).
- At complex interchanges, route shield pavement markings help motorists get into the correct lane.

== Comparison table ==
International (style may vary according to local country):

- Trans-African Highway network:
- International E-road network:
- Asian Highway Network:
- Arab Mashreq International Road Network:
- Pan-American Highway:

National:

	Controlled-access highway		Primary route (usually called National/Federal Highway/Route)		Other routes (usually called Regional/County/etc. Route)	
Andorra	Not present			Carretera general		Carretera secundaria
Albania		Autostrada		Rruga shtetëtore		Rrugë rrethi
Armenia		Միջպետական ճանապարհ Mijpetakan twanaparh		Համապետական ճանապարհ Hamapetakan twanaparh		Տեղական ճանապարհ Teghakan twanaparh
Argentina		Autopista		Ruta nacional		Ruta provincial
Austria		Autobahn		Schnellstraße		Landesstraße
Austria		Autobahn		Bundesstraße		Landesstraße
Azerbaijan		Magistral avtomobil yol		Respublika əhəmiyyətli yol		Yerli əhəmiyyətli yol
Belarus		Магістраль Magistrałʹ		Рэспубліканская аўтамабільная дарога Respubłikanskaja aŭtamabiłʹnaja daroga		
Belgium		Dutch: Autosnelweg French: Autoroute		Dutch: N-weg French: Route nationale		
Bolivia		Ruta nacional		Ruta departemental		Ruta municipal
Bosnia and Herzegovina		Autoput		Magistralna cesta		
Bosnia and Herzegovina		Autoput		Brze ceste		
Brazil	Rodovia federal					Rodovia estadual
Bulgaria		Aвтомагистрала Avtomagistrala		Републикански път Republikanski pǎt		
Cambodia		ផ្លាកសញ្ញាផ្លូវល្បឿនលឿន		ផ្លាកសញ្ញាផ្លូវជាតិ		
Central African Republic	Not present			Route nationale		Route régionale
Chile		Autopista		Ruta nacional		Ruta regional
China		高速公路 Gāosù Gōnglù		国道 Guódào		省道 Shěngdào
Colombia	Ruta nacional					
Croatia		Autocesta		Državna cesta		Županijska cesta
Cuba		Autopista		Circuito / Carretera		Circuito / Carretera
Cyprus		Αυτοκινητόδρομος Aftokinitódromos				
Czech Republic		Dálnice		Silnice		
Denmark	Uses E-road or primary route signs			Primærrute		Sekundærrute
Ecuador				Via Colectora		
Estonia	Not present			Põhimaantee		Tugimaantee
Finland		Valtatie		Kantatie		Seututie
France		Autoroute		Route nationale		Route départementale
France		Autoroute		Route territoriale (Corsica)		Route départementale
Georgia		საერთაშორისო მნიშვნელობის გზა Saertashoriso mnishvnelobis gza		შიდასახელმწიფოებრივი მნიშვნელობის გზა Shidasakhelmts'ipoebrivi mnishvnelobis gza		ადგილობრივი მნიშვნელობის გზა Adgilobrivi mnishvnelobis gza
Germany		Autobahn		Bundesstraße	L 1	Landesstraße
Germany		Autobahn		Bundesstraße	K 1	Kreisstraße
Ghana						
Greece		Αυτοκινητόδρομος Aftokinitódromos		Εθνική Οδός Ethnikí Odós		
Hungary		Autópálya		Főút		
India		National expressway		National highway		State highway
Indonesia		Jalan tol		Jalan nasional		
Iran		آزادراه Azadrah		بزرگراه Bozorgrah		جاده Jadeh
Ireland		Motorway Irish: Mótarbhealach		National road Irish: Bóthar náisiúnta		Regional road Irish: Bóthar réigiúnach
Israel		כביש ארצי ראשי Kvīsh Arzī Roshī		כביש לאומי Kvīsh Ləʾummī		כביש אזורי Kvīsh Asōrī
Israel		כביש ארצי ראשי Kvīsh Arzī Roshī		כביש לאומי Kvīsh Ləʾummī		כביש מקומי Kvīsh Mɘqōmī
Italy		Autostrada		Strada statale		Strada regionale
Italy		Autostrada		Strada statale		Strada provinciale
Japan		高速道路 Kōsokudōro		一般国道 Ippan kokudō		県道/府道/都道/道道 Kendō/Fudō/Todō/Dōdō (Note: The term depends on the type of prefecture, and the upper inscription on the shield changes to reflect this.)
Jordan						
Kazakhstan						
Kosovo		Albanian: Autostrada		Albanian: Magjistralja		
Laos						
Latvia	Not present			Autoceļš		Reģionālais autoceļš
Lithuania		Automagistralė		Krašto kelias	1	Rajoninai kelias
Luxembourg		Luxembourgish: Autobunn French: Autoroute		Luxembourgish: Nationalstrooss French: Route nationale		French: Chemin repris (Note: French term is also used in Luxembourgish.)
Malaysia		Lebuhraya		Jalan persekutuan		
Mexico		Carretera federal		Carretera estatal		Carretera rural
Moldova	Not present			Drum național		Drum republicane
Montenegro		Autoput		Magistralni put		
Namibia						
Nepal						
Netherlands		Autosnelweg		Autoweg		
New Zealand	State Highway					
Nicaragua		Carretera centroamericana		Carretera troncal principal		Carretera troncal secundaria
North Macedonia		Avtopat		Polaavtopat		
Norway	Uses E-road or primary route signs			Riksvei		Fylkesvei
Pakistan						
Paraguay		Ruta nacional		Ruta departamental		
Peru						
Philippines		Expressway		National road		
Poland		Autostrada		Droga krajowa		Droga wojewódzka
Poland		Droga ekspresowa		Droga krajowa		Droga wojewódzka
Portugal	A 1	Autoestrada	IP 1	Itinerário principal	IC 1	Itinerário complementar
Portugal	A 1	Autoestrada	IP 1	Itinerário principal	N 1	Estrada nacional
Portugal	A 1	Autoestrada	IP 1	Itinerário principal	R 1	Estrada regional
Romania		Autostradă		Drum național		Drum județean
Russia		Автодорога (Avtodoroga)		Маршрут (Marshrut)		
Serbia		Auto-put		Magistralni put		Regionalni put
Singapore	Expressway					
Slovakia		Diaľnica		Rýchlostná cesta		Cesta II. triedy
Slovakia		Diaľnica		Cesta I. triedy		Cesta II. triedy
Slovenia		Avtocesta		Hitra cesta		Regionalna cesta
Slovenia		Avtocesta		Glavna cesta		Regionalna cesta
South Africa		National route				
South Korea		고속국도 Gosokgukdo		일반국도 Ilbangukdo		지방도 Jibangdo
Spain		Autovía		Carretera nacional		Carretera comarcal
Spain		Autopista		Carretera nacional		Carretera principal
Sweden	Uses E-road or primary route signs			Riksväg		Länsväg
Switzerland		Autobahn		Hauptstraße	1	Kantonsstraße
Taiwan		國道 Guódào		省道 Shěngdào		縣道 Xiàndào
Thailand		ทางหลวงแผ่นดินพิเศษ Thang-luang phaen-din phi-set		ทางหลวงแผ่นดิน Thang-luang phaen-din		ทางหลวงชนบท Thang-luang chon-na-bot
Thailand		ทางหลวงแผ่นดินพิเศษ Thang-luang phaen-din phi-set		ทางหลวงแผ่นดิน Thang-luang phaen-din		ทางหลวงท้องถิ่น Thang-luang thong-thin
Turkey		Otoyol		Devlet yolu		İl yolu
Ukraine		Автошлях (Avtoshlyakh)				
United Kingdom		Motorway		A-road		B-road
United States		Interstate Highway		U.S. Numbered Highway		State Highway (Note: Exact terminology varies by state or territory. Shown here is the default marker from the Manual on Uniform Traffic Control Devices, but most jurisdictions use a different design specific to their area.)
Uruguay		Ruta nacional				
Venezuela		Autopista		Ruta local		
Vietnam		Cao tốc		Quốc lộ		

Outside the table, some countries also have dedicated shields for local roads or municipal-level highways:

- Albania: Rrugë komunale
- Finland: Local road / Yhdystie
- Ireland: Local road / Irish: Bóthar áitiúil
- Italy: Strada comunale
- Latvia: Vietējais autoceļš
- Portugal: M 500 Estrada municipal
- Spain: Carretera local

== Highway shields by country ==
=== Australia ===
Australia has maintained distinctly different trends pertaining to highway shields in the past and will continue in this vein somewhat, despite the conversion to alpha-numeric routes and shields. Alpha-numeric route numbering has been in use in Tasmania since the 1970s, and was introduced in the mainland states from 1996, with the state of Victoria being the first to implement the policy on the mainland.

Prior to this conversion and concurrently, Federal Highway (gold-on-green squared-off bullet), National Highway (black-on-white squared-off bullet), State Highway (blue bullet) and Tourist Route (white-on-brown rounded pentagon) shields existed. In Victoria Freeway shields were used (white-on-green with 'F' prefix) until the late 1980s, while during the 1990s Queensland and New South Wales implemented a hexagonal blue-on-white Metroad system of urban arterial routes. The Western Ring Road (now M80) in Melbourne initially used a shield quite similar to the U.S. Interstate shield, albeit with 'Ring Road' written instead of 'Interstate' and with 2 peaks rather than 3.

To further complicate matters, with the introduction of the alpha-numeric system, roads that are federally funded (or Federal Highways) have a squared-off bullet encompassing the alpha-numeric designation. Freeways and dual-carriageway roads often use an 'M' prefix, particularly in Victoria. In addition, trapezoidal signs are placed every 5 km on major regional highways and freeways indicating the distance to the post office of the next city or major town on the route. These signs usually only have the first letter of the destination; two or three letters are used if there is ambiguity between nearby towns or when the place name consists of two words.

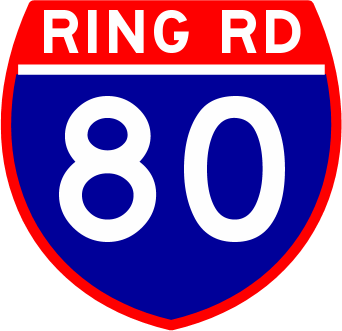
Ring Road Route

=== Brazil ===
Federal and state highways shields are standardized in Brazil by the National Transit Department (DENATRAN), but implementation is not always consistent nor even existent. In many states, highway names appear on highway location markers and guide signs with no highway shield.

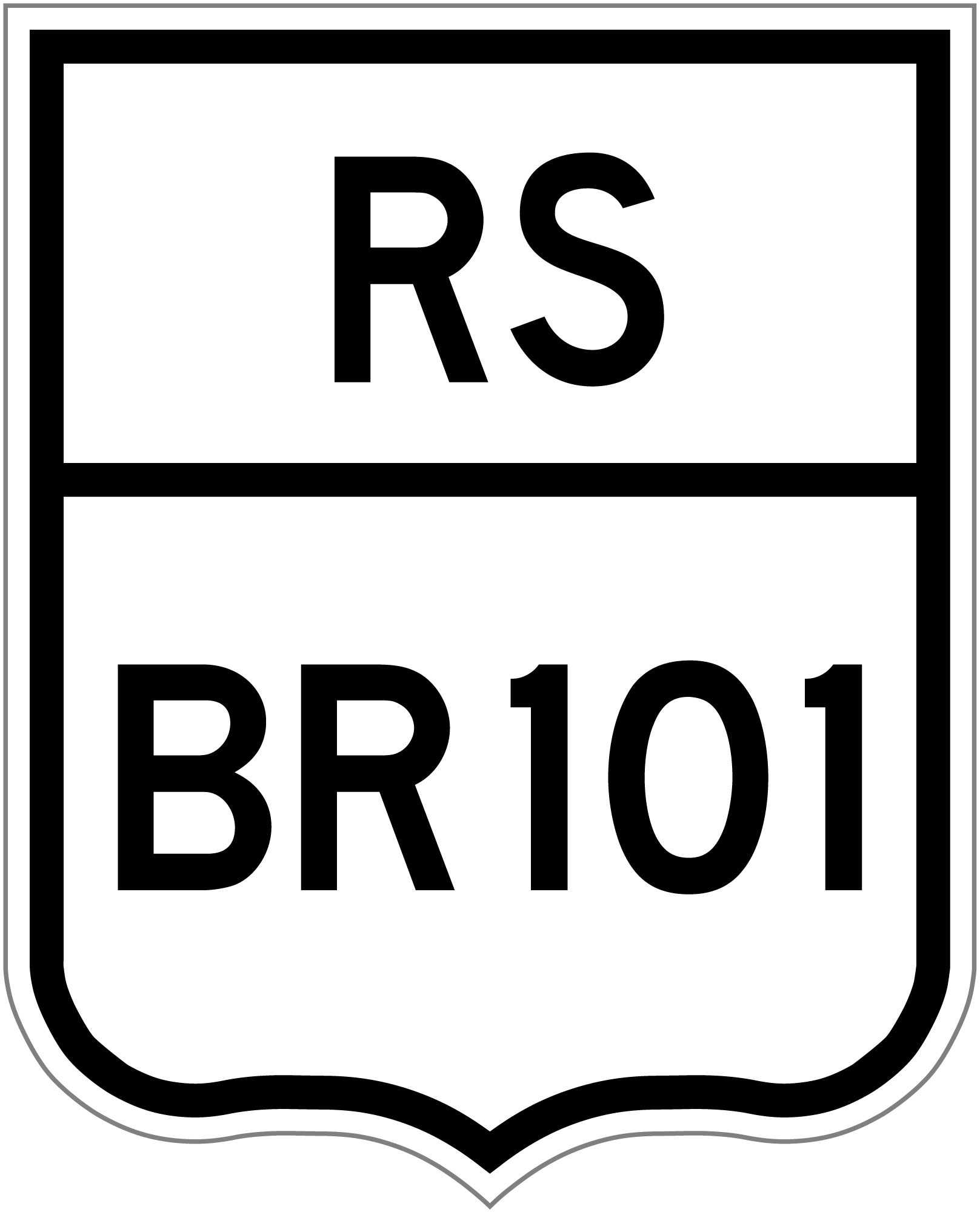
BR-101 federal highway shield as it appears in Rio Grande do Sul state

BR-116 federal highway shield as it appears in Rio de Janeiro state

RS-389 state highway shield in Rio Grande do Sul

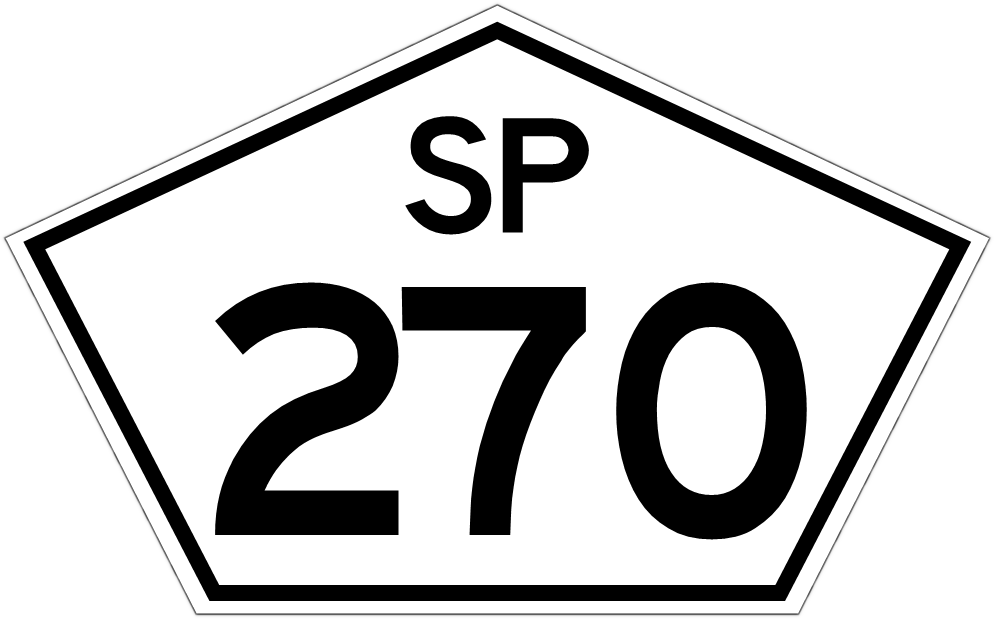
SP-270 state highway shield in the state of São Paulo

=== Canada ===

Each province dictates the type of shields used as highway transportation is a provincial responsibility. However, the green and white signage for the Trans-Canada Highway is used nationwide. Each province has their own shape for the sign, though.

==== Alberta ====

Shields for core highways in Alberta use black route number on a white squared-off bullet, while shields for local highways (500-986) use black route number on a white oval. Both variants feature the provincial wordmark across the top, although it may be omitted on certain guide signs.

==== British Columbia ====

Standard shields for highways in British Columbia use blue route number on a white bullet, with the provincial shield of arms placed at the top. Certain highways (e.g. Crowsnest Highway, Southern Yellowhead Highway and Nisga'a Highway) use their own variations on the default provincial highway shield.

==== Ontario ====
Major or 400-series highways in Ontario have different kinds of shields depending on usage:

- Roadside reassurance markers take the shape of a bullet with a crown on top. Default colour scheme is black text on white background, although the Queen Elizabeth Way uses blue "QEW" on gold, and provincially maintained toll highways (407, 412 and 418) use white route numbers on blue. These shields used to be emblazoned with "The King's Highway" across the top, but the wording has been removed since the 1990s.
- Markers on guide signs take the shape of a crown silhouette, with the route number placed within.

The exception is the private 407 Express Toll Route, which uses black route number on a white oval marker for both purposes.

Secondary provincial highways use an isosceles trapezoid as markers, while tertiary provincial highway markers use a rectangle with rounded corners.

Numbered roads maintained by Ontario's counties, regional municipalities and single-tier municipalities use an inverted isosceles trapezoid as markers. The default colour scheme is black text on a white background, although certain jurisdictions use their own colour combinations (e.g. white on blue in Niagara, gold on black in Peel, and gold on green in Halton).

On the other hand, instead of an inverted trapezoid, the single-tier city of Toronto uses a roundel for its municipally maintained freeways, the Gardiner Expressway and the Don Valley Parkway. The design is two-tone gold-on-green, with the road name in white on the green outer ring, and either the cardinal direction (for reassurance markers) or an arrow (for guidance to the freeway) in black on the gold inner disc. The city's other roads, such as Allen Road, do not have their own shields.

Typical Ontario primary/400-series highway sign using a bullet-shaped shield

Marker on guide signs for primary/400-series highway in the shape of a crown silhouette

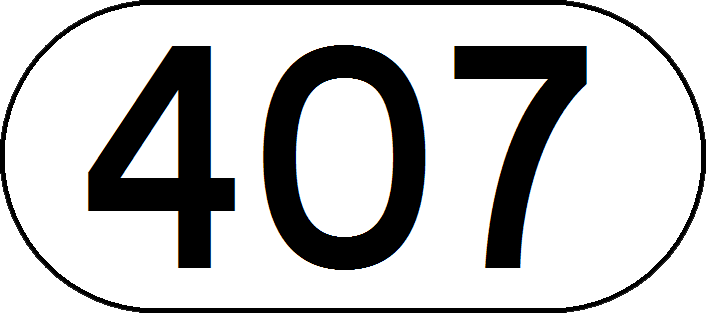
407 Express Toll Route using an oval marker

Typical Ontario secondary road sign using an isosceles trapezoid shield

Typical Ontario tertiary road sign using a rectangle

Typical Ontario county/regional road sign using an inverted isosceles trapezoid

Toronto municipal freeway shield, used on Don Valley Parkway and Gardiner Expressway

==== Quebec ====
Shields for controlled-access autoroutes in Quebec use white route number on a blue bullet, with a white stylised drawing of a dual carriageway and an overpass on red across the top. Other provincial routes use white route number on a green French shield with three white fleur-de-lys across the top, while forest routes use white route number on a blue French shield with three white stylised trees across the top.

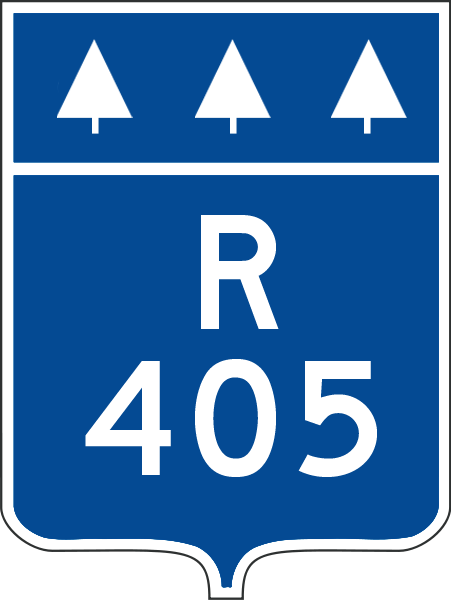

=== Mainland China ===
In mainland China, highway shields use specific letter designations to indicate the administrative level of the road, as outlined by the "Highway Route Signage Rules and National Road Numbering" (GB/T 917-2017). The designations are:

- G (GUO): National highways, which include national expressways and general national roads.
- S (SHENG): Provincial roads, covering both provincial expressways and general provincial roads.
- X (XIAN): County roads.
- Y: A designation for rural roads, used when county identifiers overlap.
- C (CUN): Village roads.
- Z (ZHUAN): Special-use roads.

For general roads (like general national and provincial roads, county, village, and special-use roads), the shield displays the administrative letter "G(S/X/Y/C/Z)" followed by a three-digit number. National expressways specifically have shields that begin with the letter "G". For main arteries like radial roads from the capital, north-south vertical roads, east-west horizontal roads, and regional ring roads, the shield shows "G" followed by up to two digits. For bypasses, connecting roads, and parallel roads, the shield combines the "G" designation with a two-digit main line number, a type identifier, and a sequence number.

Provincial expressways start with the letter "S". The main arteries and city bypass/connecting road shields display the "S" followed by up to two or two digits, respectively. These provincial expressway shields typically have a yellow background with black characters, showing the province's abbreviation followed by "Expressway", like "Su Expressway" for Jiangsu or "Zhe Expressway" for Zhejiang. In provinces with dense provincial expressway networks, like Guangdong, where S1-S99 cannot cover all roads, shorter connecting roads may use an "S" followed by a four-digit number.

National expressways (国道) feature a red background at the top of their shields, indicating their status as national routes. Provincial expressways (省道) have a yellow background at the top. All other road categories use a white background for their shields.

National Exphwy

Link line of National Exphwy

Provincial Exphwy

National Highway

Provincial Highway

County Road

=== Germany ===
German Autobahns as the nation's federal controlled-access highway system use a blue shield with slanted edges and white lettering. Other federal highways use a yellow shield with black lettering. The color schemes mirror the country's directional signage coloring system on these two types of roads.

Autobahn Number

Federal Road Number

=== Hong Kong ===
A typical shield for a numbered route in Hong Kong.

The Hong Kong Strategic Route and Exit Number System states that the standard shield should consist of a yellow, bullet-shaped shield with the route number in black color. It is used on all numbered routes in Hong Kong.

=== Japan ===
The national highways of Japan use a triangular blue shield with a white route number. The expressways use a rectangular green shield with a white letter and number combination with the name of the route written in Japanese and English. Routes on urban expressways are signed with a green shield with white numbers. The Shuto Expressway system also uses this sign but with the route name written in kanji-characters above the number. Prefecture-maintained routes use a hexagonal blue shield with a white route number, letter, or combination of both.

National route shield

Expressway shield

Urban expressway shield

Shuto Expressway shield

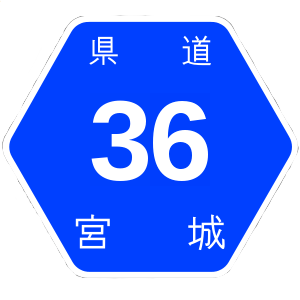
Prefecture route shield

=== Malaysia ===
According to the Manual on Traffic Control Devices Standard Traffic Signs archived by Malaysian Public Works Department, a standard Malaysian highway shield consists of a yellow hexagon shield with black border line which resembles the Public Works Department's logo itself. The highway shield standard is used for all expressways, federal and state roads in Malaysia, which can be distinguished through the numbering scheme used (please refer to the Road signs in Malaysia article for details).

A typical Malaysian federal road shield.

Expressways and highway shield.

=== New Zealand ===

New Zealand shields are similar to the bullet-shaped markers used in Hong Kong, but are red rather than yellow.

=== South Africa ===
The Southern African Development Community Road Traffic Signs Manual specifies designs for "confirmation route markers" for numbered national, provincial, regional and metropolitan routes. The national route marker is pentagonal, the provincial route marker is diamond-shaped, and the regional and metropolitan route markers are rectangular. The background is blue when used on a freeway and green for other roads. There is a white border and the lettering is yellow.

National route marker (freeway variant)

Provincial route marker

Regional route marker

Metropolitan route marker

=== South Korea ===
The expressway shields are shaped like U.S. Highway shields and colored like Interstate shields with red, white and blue, the colors of the flag of South Korea. The national route shields are a blue oval, and local route shields are a yellow square.

Expressway

National Route

Urban Expressway

=== Taiwan ===
The national highway shields are in the shape of the Prunus mume, the national flower of Taiwan. Provincial highways have triangular shields similar in shape to that of the national highways of Japan, with different colored backgrounds to distinguish between ordinary roads and expressways. The county and city highways have a square shield, while its spur roads as well as township and district roads have rectangular ones.

National Highway

Provincial Highway

Provincial Expressway

County and City Highways

County and City Highways (Spur)

Township and District Roads

=== United States ===
The default state route marker in the United States—now used by only five states for their primary routes.

The United States' Manual on Uniform Traffic Control Devices (MUTCD) gives standard designs for highways in the Interstate Highway System and U.S. Route system. The Interstate shield is the only trademarked highway marker in use in the United States (being registered by the American Association of State Highway and Transportation Officials, the trade association of the states' departments of transportation and also a standards organization for highway engineering), and the U.S. Route shield was inspired by the Great Seal of the United States. The MUTCD also provides default designs for state highways (the circular highway shield) and county highways (a blue pentagon with yellow text). However, states are free to use any design for their numbered routes; as of 2021 only five states (Delaware, Iowa, Kentucky, Mississippi, and New Jersey) use the default shield on their primary systems, and all others use a custom design, such as the state outline, state symbol, or another generic shape. Some U.S. counties and townships also have unique shield designs, though most use the MUTCD default.

== Alternatives to shields ==
Many countries worldwide, such as the United Kingdom and France, do not use shields, instead relying on text representations of highway numbers. Road numbers (the term "highway" is not in general use in the UK) are prefixed by a letter indicating the type of road, for example M1, A1, B123 in the UK; A1, N1, D1 in France. These are sometimes highlighted with a different background color, depending on the class of highway and the context of the sign. The Vienna Convention on Road Signs and Signals specifies that "road identification signs" consist of the route number framed in a rectangle, a shield, or the relevant state's route classification symbol (if one exists). The extent to which such signs are used varies between countries.

In the United States, route shield pavement markings sometimes accompany physical highway shield signs or serve as replacements for them.
