= Route shield pavement marking =

Type of road surface marking

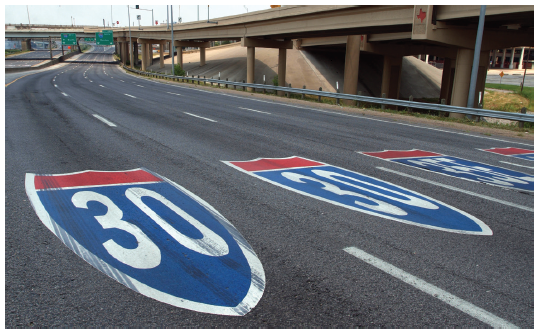
Route shield pavement markings for Interstate Highways 30 and 35E at the Dallas Horseshoe.

A route shield pavement marking (also called an advance pavement marking or pavement marking shield) is a road surface marking that depicts a route shield and functions as either a road traffic safety measure or a mitigation against street sign theft.

Many countries, including those that never use highway shields, such as France, the United Kingdom and Germany, paint highway numbers on the surface. The Vienna Convention on Road Signs and Signals allows highway numbers to be painted on surface, either white or coloured (most often in white). An example in the United Kingdom is the A33 painted on a lane destined for Basingstoke.

== Purpose ==
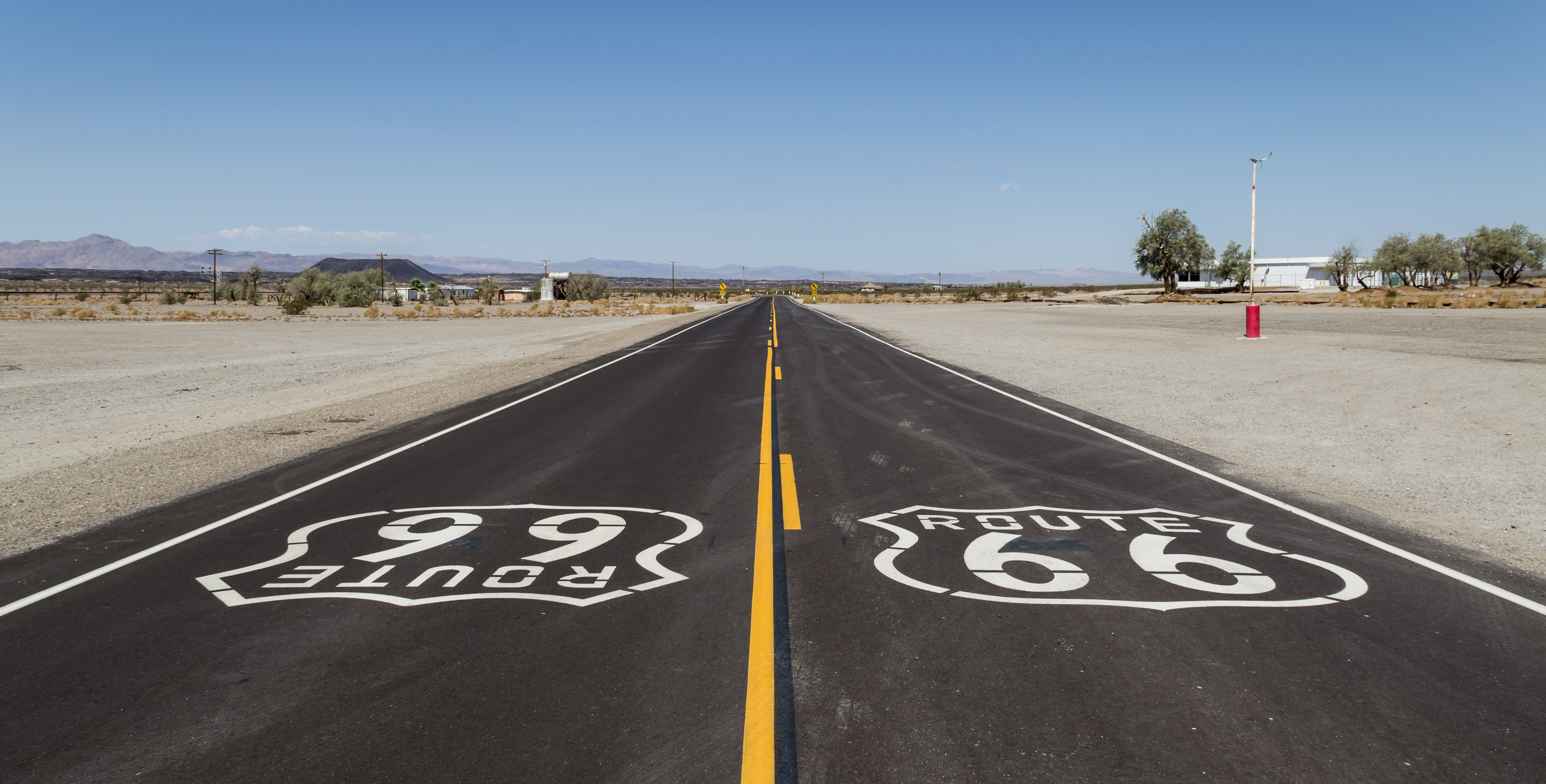
Route shield pavement markings along Historic U.S. Route 66 in Amboy, California.

Route shield pavement markings are closely associated with U.S. Route 66. Owing to the original route's fame, reassurance markers for "Historic U.S. Route 66" have often been stolen by souvenir hunters, so many localities have painted or stenciled the U.S. Route shield or outline directly onto the pavement.

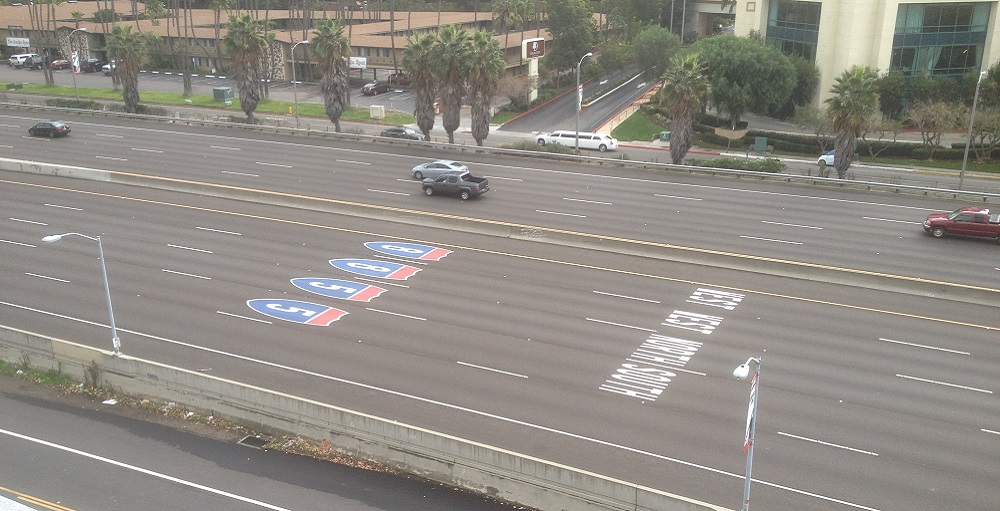
Route shield pavement markings Interstates 8 and 5 in San Diego.

The 2009 edition of the Manual on Uniform Traffic Control Devices and accompanying Standard Highway Signs and Markings handbook introduced the route shield pavement marking as an option generally available to traffic engineers. It may be used as a safety device on a multilane, controlled-access highway, reminding motorists to change to the correct lane well in advance of a major freeway interchange or fork; on a surface street leading to a freeway entrance ramp, where it is infeasible to install an overhead guide sign; or ahead of a multi-lane roundabout. Route shield pavement markings are intended to aid older drivers who have experienced a decline in working memory or attention span.

Route shield pavement markings have been installed in a number of U.S. cities. In 2018, the California Department of Transportation began installing them in the Sacramento area using funds from the 2017 Road Repair and Accountability Act. In Knoxville, Tennessee, route shields were affixed to the Interstate 40 road surface as a cost-effective mitigation for a high crash rate caused by weaving maneuvers.

The Ohio Department of Transportation suggests route shield pavement markings as one method for park and trail managers to display reassurance markers along off-road portions of U.S. Bicycle Routes and state bicycle routes.

== Design and application ==
Modern route shield pavement markings are made of thermoplastic road marking paint with glass beads for reflectivity at night. They may be installed as part of a routine resurfacing project or after the fact, by placing and melting prefabricated mats onto the road surface. Depending on traffic volumes and weather conditions, they are expected to last from three to five years. The paint can be textured to provide adequate friction for motorcyclists.

A route shield pavement marking measures approximately 6 by 15 feet (1.8 m × 4.6 m). It is half the width of a standard Interstate highway lane; like some other kinds of pavement markings, it is elongated to appear proportional to a driver traveling at high speed. It may appear in full color or as a simple outline.

== Effectiveness ==
A 2010 study by the Texas A&M Transportation Institute found that route shield pavement markings combined with directional arrows were more effective than overhead guide signs in stressful situations. As of 2019, their effectiveness has not been proven in the field through statistical analysis.
