= Gemeindestraße =

Type of local road in Germany

A Gemeindestraße (German pronunciation: [ɡəˈmaɪndəˌʃtʁaːsə], lit. 'municipal road') is a local road in Germany that is the responsibility of the municipality or parish (Gemeinde) or of the town (kreisfreie Stadt) to build and/or maintain. In the official ranking of roads by importance a Gemeindestraße falls below a Kreisstraße and, unlike the latter, it is not numbered.

Because these roads have to be funded by the local community, the parishes occasionally try to have Gemeindestraßen reclassified as Kreisstraßen that then have to be maintained by the district or Kreis. This is also important for those living there e.g. because then the permission for enclosing the road is decided elsewhere and the occupants' contributions may be calculated differently.

== See also ==
- Autobahn
- Bundesstraße
- Landesstraße
- Kreisstraße
