= Road transport in Japan =

Highway system of Japan
- Highway markers for the Tōhoku Expressway, the Shibuya Route, National Route 4, and Aomori Prefecture Route 120

System information
- Maintained by Ministry of Land, Infrastructure, Transport and Tourism, East Nippon Expressway Company, Central Nippon Expressway Company, West Nippon Expressway Company, and prefectures
- Formed: Road Act was signed in 1919, other systems have continuously been in place since at least the 3rd century

Highway names
- Expressways: x Expressway (CA)/(Cn)/(En)/(EnA)
- Urban expressways: system name x Route (n)/(Cn)/(Kn)/(Sn)
- National highways: National Route n
- Prefectural roads: x Prefecture Route n

System links
- National highways of Japan; Expressways of Japan

Road transport is an essential element of the Japanese transport network, and vital part of the Japanese economy. Japan's history of having human-made roads ranging from the present to the Jōmon period. The Gokishichidō of the Asuka period and the Edo period kaidō both figured into the government's attempts to centralize their authority. As of April 2012, Japan had a road network of approximately 1,215,000 kilometers (755,000 mi) of roads made up of 1,022,000 kilometers (635,000 mi) of city, town and village roads, 129,000 kilometers (80,000 mi) of prefectural roads, 55,000 kilometers (34,000 mi) of national highways, and 8,050 kilometers (5,000 mi) of expressways.

== Highway systems ==
As of April 2012, Japan had a road network of approximately 1,215,000 kilometers (755,000 mi) of roads made up of 1,022,000 kilometers (635,000 mi) of city, town, and village roads, 129,000 kilometers (80,000 mi) of prefectural roads, 55,000 kilometers (34,000 mi) of national highways, and 8,050 kilometers (5,000 mi) of expressways.

=== Roadside stations ===
A roadside station (道の駅, Michi-no-eki) is a government-designated rest area. Not to be confused with the service areas found along the country's expressways, the roadside stations are found along the national and prefectural highways of Japan. They serve as places for travelers to rest and they are also intended to promote local tourism and trade. Shops within them often sell local produce, snacks, souvenirs, and other goods. All roadside stations provide 24-hour access to parking, public toilets and facilities for sharing information.

As of September 2020, there are 1,180 roadside stations across Japan: 128 in Hokkaido, 165 in the Tōhoku area, 180 in the Kantō region, 82 in the Hokuriku region, 135 in the Chubu area, 149 in the Kinki area, 107 in the Chugoku area, 88 in the Shikoku area, and 146 in the Kyushu region. The Ministry of Land, Infrastructure, Transport and Tourism conducted an experiment at 13 roadside stations across the country from 2017 to 2018 to test the feasibility of having self-driving cars carry people and products to and from homes within a range of 4 to 5 kilometers (2.5 to 3.1 mi) from roadside stations.

== Numbering ==
Each level of the Japanese road network has its own numbering scheme. For national and prefectural routes, numbers of lower value indicate greater significance to the system. In the national highway network, highways with values 1 to 57 were originally established as the Primary National Highways, routes with three-digit numbers were established later and the earliest of those were originally called Secondary National Highways. The distinction between the primary and secondary highways was dropped in 1965 and now the national highways are all referred to officially as General National Highways. The only highway to be given a two digit number since the creation of the Primary National Highways is National Route 58, which connects the capital cities Kagoshima and Naha of Kagoshima Prefecture and Okinawa Prefecture, the latter of which was occupied during the creation of the system. It was added to the system shortly after the handover of the Ryukyu Islands from the United States to Japan.

The national and regional expressways follow their own numbering scheme that was implemented in 2016. The first two group of expressways are numbered with the letter E followed by a number. The second of these two groups has the letter A appended to the designation to indicate that it is a route related to the non-appended route. The numerical value chosen for these expressways generally matches the number of a pre-existing national highway that parallels the expressway. An example of this layout is that National Route 4 travels from Tokyo to Aomori. It is paralleled by the Tōhoku Expressway, so it was numbered E4. The Hachinohe Expressway is a spur route of the Tōhoku Expressway, so it was numbered E4A alongside several other routes, due to their relation to the Tōhoku Expressway. As of September 2020, there are no expressways designated with numerical values greater than 98. Expressways falling between the numbers 59 and 98 were given numbers that don't match any existing national highways to prevent any route from having a three-digit numerical value. The final grouping of national and regional expressways are beltways, they are numbered with the letter C followed by a number rather than E like the other expressways. An exception to the rules is found in the Tokyo Bay Aqua-Line which is numbered CA.

== History ==
=== Prehistory ===
The initial development of roads in Japan can be traced back to the Jōmon period. The remains of a man-made road were uncovered at the Sannai-Maruyama Site that was occupied between 3900 – 2200 BC. Archaeologists uncovered a 12-meter-wide (39 ft) and 420-meter-long (1,380 ft) road at the site that linked the ancient settlement to the sea.

=== Feudal period ===
The existence of a road network in Japan as early as the 3rd century is noted in the Chinese Records of the Three Kingdoms. The first Japanese written record of a road in Japan was created in 720 when the Yamanobe Road was written about in the Nihon Shoki. Established sometime during the Asuka period, the Yamanobe Road was a narrow path that linked the cities of Osaka and Nara.

The Gokishichidō of the Asuka period and the Edo period kaidō both figured into the government's attempts to centralize their authority.

=== Meiji period to World War II ===
The kaidō of the Edo period were still in service at the onset of the Meiji period, however, the roads were never intended to be used by wheeled vehicles and they rapidly broke down under the additional strain. Some of the pressure was taken off of the strained road network by the Meiji government's decision to prioritize the rail and sea networks over the roads.

The Road Act was enacted in 1919, establishing a classification of five categories of roads under the control of the national government: national roads, prefectural roads, district roads, city roads, and municipal roads. It also reorganized the existing national roads. District roads were redesignated as prefectural roads on 1 April 1923 after the district was removed as level of government administration.

=== Allied occupation to present ===
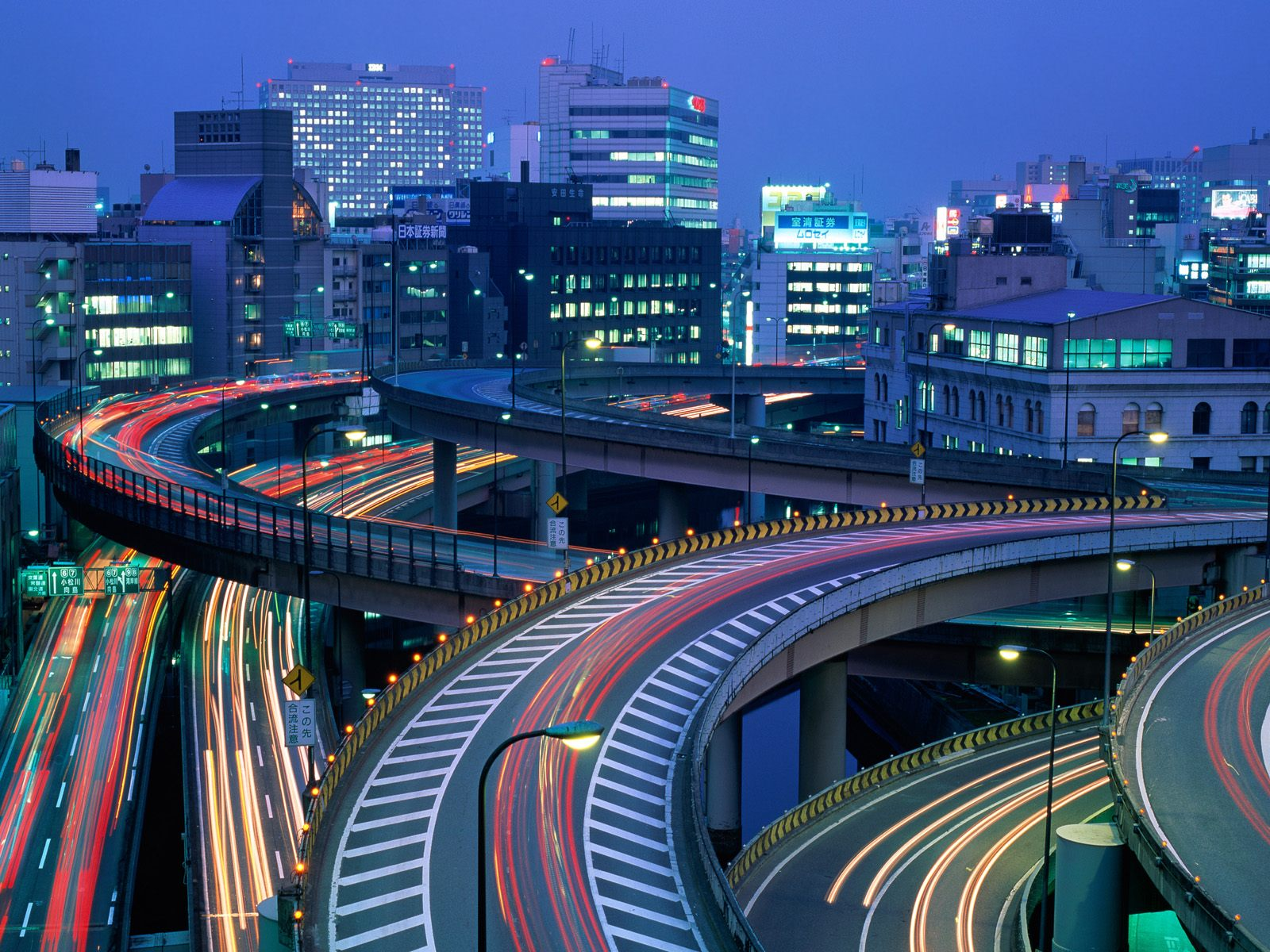
Edobashi Junction in central Tokyo

After the end of the occupation, just 14 percent of all roads in Japan were paved. By 1965 that percentage had increased to 57, and further by 1975 when 79 percent of roads were paved. As of 2018, over 90 percent of roads and highways in Japan have been paved. Since 1954 Japan has invested in a series of five-year plans to improve its roads and highways. Expenditures from these plans have steadily increased from the initial 308.6 billion yen being spent in the first plan to 65.3 trillion yen in the most recent plan.

In April 1956 the Japan Highway Public Corporation was established by the national government with the task of constructing and managing a nationwide network of expressways. In 1957 permission was given to the corporation to commence construction of the Meishin Expressway linking the cities of Nagoya and Kobe, the first section of which opened to traffic in 1963.

Road passenger and freight transport expanded considerably during the 1980s as private ownership of motor vehicles greatly increased along with the quality and reach of the nation's roads. Bus companies, including the JR Bus company, operate long-distance bus services on the nation's expanding expressway network. In addition to relatively low fares and deluxe seating, the buses are well utilized because they continue service during the night, when air and train services are limited.

The cargo sector grew rapidly in the 1980s, recording 274.2 billion tonne-kilometers in 1990. The freight handled by motor vehicles, mainly trucks, in 1990, was over 6 billion metric tons, accounting for 90 percent of domestic freight tonnage and about 50 percent of tonne-kilometers.

== See also ==
- Rail transport in Japan
