= United States Numbered Highway System =

Highway system of the United States of America

- Design changes of U.S. Highway shield

- Map of the present U.S. Highway network: purple are double-digit U.S. Routes, blue are triple-digit U.S. Routes, and gray are Interstate Routes

System information
- Maintained by primarily state or local governments; numbers and routings approved by AASHTO (Note: The American Association of State Highway Officials (AASHO) was renamed the American Association of State Highway and Transportation Officials (AASHTO) on November 11, 1973.)
- Length: 157,724 mi (Note: As of 1989.) (253,832 km)
- Formed: November 11, 1926

Highway names
- US Highways: U.S. Highway nn (US nn); U.S. Route nn (US nn)

System links
- United States Numbered Highway System; List; Special; Divided

The United States Numbered Highway System (often called U.S. Routes or U.S. Highways) is an integrated network of roads and highways numbered within a nationwide grid in the contiguous United States. As the designation and numbering of these highways were coordinated among the states, they are sometimes called Federal Highways, but the roadways were built and have always been maintained by state or local governments since their initial designation in 1926.

The route numbers and locations are coordinated by the American Association of State Highway and Transportation Officials (AASHTO). The only federal involvement in AASHTO is a nonvoting seat for the United States Department of Transportation. Generally, most north-to-south highways are odd-numbered, with the lowest numbers in the east and the highest in the west. East-to-west highways are typically even-numbered, with the lowest numbers in the north, and the highest in the south, though the grid guidelines are not rigidly followed, and many exceptions exist. Major north–south routes generally have numbers ending in "1". Major east–west routes usually have numbers ending in "0". (Note: The Interstate Highway System also assigns even numbers to east–west highways and odd numbers to north–south highways. It uses different origins, with the lowest numbers in the south and west. That system also skips some numbers so that generally speaking, a state would not have highways in both systems with the same number.) Three-digit numbered highways are generally spur routes of parent highways; for example, U.S. Route 421 (US 421) is a spur off US 21. Some divided routes, such as US 19E/US 19W and US 25E/US 25W, exist to provide two alignments for one route. Special routes, which can be labeled as alternate, bypass or business, depending on the intended use, provide a parallel routing to the mainline U.S. Highway—an example being US 74 and its many special routes.

Before the U.S. Routes were designated, auto trails designated by auto trail associations were the main means of marking roads through the United States. These were private organizations, and the system of road marking at the time was haphazard and not uniform. In 1925, the Joint Board on Interstate Highways, recommended by AASHTO, worked to form a national numbering system to rationalize the roads. After several meetings, a final report was approved by the U.S. Department of Agriculture in November 1925. After getting feedback from the states, they made several modifications. The U.S. Highway System was approved on November 11, 1926.

Expansion of the U.S. Highway System continued until 1956, when the Interstate Highway System was laid out and began construction under the administration of President Dwight D. Eisenhower. After the national implementation of the Interstate Highway System, many U.S. Routes that had been bypassed or overlaid with Interstate Highways were decommissioned and removed from the system.

While the system's growth has slowed in recent decades, the U.S. Highway System remains in place to this day, and expansions to the system (i.e. extensions and new routes) are occasionally added. The most recent addition occurred in November 2023 with an extension of US-78 from its previous western terminus in Memphis, Tennessee, across the Memphis & Arkansas Bridge to a new western terminus near Swifton, Arkansas.

== System details ==
In general, U.S. Routes do not have a minimum design standard, unlike the later Interstate Highways, and are not usually built to freeway standards. Some stretches of U.S. Routes do meet those standards. Many are designated using the main streets of the cities and towns through which they run. New additions to the system must "substantially meet the current AASHTO design standards". As of 1989, the United States Numbered Highways system had a total length of 157,724 miles (253,832 km).

Except for toll bridges and tunnels, very few U.S. Routes are toll roads. AASHTO policy says that a toll road may only be included as a special route, and that "a toll-free routing between the same termini shall continue to be retained and marked as a part of the U.S. Numbered System." US 3 meets this obligation; in New Hampshire, it does not follow tolled portions of the Everett Turnpike. However, U.S. Routes in the system use parts of five toll roads:

- US 51 uses part of the Jane Addams Memorial Tollway in Illinois; the old road is Illinois Route 251.
- US 278 uses the tolled Cross Island Parkway in South Carolina; the old road is US 278 Business. The tolls were removed in July 2021.
- US 301 is a toll road through Delaware; the former routing is a free road and uses several Delaware state routes.
- US 412 uses the Cimarron Turnpike in Oklahoma; the old road is US 64.
- US 412 also uses the Cherokee Turnpike in Oklahoma; the old road is US 412 Alternate.

=== Numbering ===
U.S. Routes in the contiguous United States follow a grid pattern, in which odd-numbered routes run generally north to south and even-numbered routes run generally east to west, though three-digit spur routes can be either-or. (Note: These three-digit spur routes are not to be confused with special routes signposted as "SPUR", such as US 95 Spur.) Some exceptions exist within the two-digit routes. These primarily occur when a route does not definitively run in a single direction. For example, US 35 runs northeast–southwest. It is signed east–west in Ohio, but north–south everywhere else.

Usually, one- and two-digit routes are major routes. Three-digit routes are numbered as shorter spur routes from a main route. Odd numbers generally increase from east to west. US 1 follows the Atlantic Coast and US 101 follows the Pacific Coast. US 101 is one of the many exceptions to the standard numbering grid. Its first "digit" is "10", and it is a main route on its own and not a spur of US 1.

Even numbers tend to increase from north to south. US 2 closely follows the Canadian border, and US 98 hugs the Gulf Coast. The longest routes connecting major cities are generally numbered to end in a 1 or a 0. Extensions and truncations have made this distinction largely meaningless. These guidelines are very rough, and exceptions to all of the basic numbering rules exist.

The numbering system extended beyond the borders of the United States in an unofficial manner. Many Canadian highways were renumbered in the 1940s and 1950s to adopt the same number as the U.S. Route they connected to – mostly in the western provinces. Examples include British Columbia's highways 93, 95, 97, and 99; Manitoba's highways 59, 75, and 83; or Ontario King's Highway 71. The reverse happened with U.S. Route 57, originally a Texas state highway numbered to match Mexican Federal Highway 57.

In the 1950s, the numbering grid for the new Interstate Highway System was established as intentionally opposite from the U.S. grid insofar as the direction the route numbers increase. Interstate Highway numbers increase from west-to-east and south-to-north, to keep identically numbered routes geographically apart in order to keep them from being confused with one another, and it omits 50 and 60 which would potentially conflict with US 50 and US 60. (Note: Exceptions to this rule do occur.)

In the U.S. Highway system, three-digit numbers are assigned to spurs of one or two-digit routes. US 201, for example, splits from US 1 at Brunswick, Maine, and runs north to Canada. Not all spurs travel in the same direction as their "parents"; some are connected to their parents only by other spurs, or not at all, instead only traveling near their parents. A spur may travel in different cardinal directions than its parent, such as US 522, which is a north–south route, unlike its parent US 22, which is east–west.

As originally assigned, the first digit of the spurs increased from north to south and east to west along the parent. For example, US 60 had spurs, running from east to west, designated as US 160 in Missouri, US 260 in Oklahoma, US 360 in Texas, and US 460 and US 560 in New Mexico. As with the two-digit routes, three-digit routes have been added, removed, extended and shortened. The "parent-child" relationship is not always present.

AASHTO guidelines specifically prohibit Interstate Highways and U.S. Routes from sharing a number within the same state. As with other guidelines, exceptions exist across the U.S.

Some two-digit numbers have never been applied to any U.S. Route, including 37, 39, 47, 86, and 88.

=== Signage ===
A U.S. Highway shield

Route numbers are displayed on a distinctively-shaped white shield with large black numerals in the center. Often, the shield is displayed against a black square or rectangular background. Each state manufactures their own signage, and as such subtle variations exist all across the United States. Individual states may use cut-out or rectangular designs, some have black outlines, and California prints the letters "US" above the numerals.

One- and two-digit shields generally feature the same large, bold numerals on a square-dimension shield. 3-digit routes may either use the same shield with a narrower font, or a wider rectangular-dimension shield. Special routes may be indicated with a banner above the route number, or with a letter suffixed to the route number.

Signs are generally displayed in several different locations. First, they are shown along the side of the route at regular intervals or after major intersections, called reassurance markers, which shows the route and the nominal direction of travel. Second, they are displayed at intersections with other major roads, so that intersecting traffic can follow their chosen course. Third, they can be displayed on large green guide signs that indicate upcoming interchanges on freeways and expressways.

=== Divided and special routes ===
Since 1926, some divided routes were designated to serve related areas, and designate roughly-equivalent splits of routes. For instance, US 11 splits into US 11E (east) and US 11W (west) in Bristol, Virginia, and the routes rejoin in Knoxville, Tennessee. Occasionally only one of the two routes is suffixed; US 6N in Pennsylvania does not rejoin US 6 at its west end. AASHTO has been trying to eliminate these since 1934. Its current policy is to deny approval of new split routes and to eliminate existing ones "as rapidly as the State Highway Department and the Standing Committee on Highways can reach agreement with reference thereto".

Special routes—those with a banner such as alternate or bypass—are also managed by AASHTO. These are sometimes designated with lettered suffixes, like A for alternate or B for business. (Note: For example, compare the following for an alternate route in Ohio: Office of Technical Services, GIS/Mapping Section (2011). Official Transportation Map (Map). 1:570,240. Columbus: Ohio Department of Transportation. §§ B2–F2.; "Street View of US 20A/SR 15 near Pioneer, OH" (Map). Google Maps.; Rand McNally (2013). The Road Atlas: United States, Canada & Mexico (Map) (2013 Walmart ed.). 1:760,320. Chicago: Rand McNally. p. 78. §§ NE2–NE6. ISBN 0-528-00626-6.)

=== Naming ===
The official route log, last published by AASHTO in 1989, has been named United States Numbered Highways since its initial publication in 1926. Within the route log, "U.S. Route" is used in the table of contents, while "United States Highway" appears as the heading for each route. All reports of the Special Committee on Route Numbering since 1989 use "U.S. Route", and federal laws relating to highways use "United States Route" or "U.S. Route" more often than the "Highway" variants. The use of U.S. Route or U.S. Highway on a local level depends on the state, with some states such as Delaware using "route" and others such as Colorado using "highway".

== History ==
=== Early auto trails ===
In 1903, Horatio Nelson Jackson and his hired mechanic Sewall K. Crocker became the first documented people to drive an automobile from San Francisco to New York, using only a connection of dirt roads, cow paths, and railroad beds. Their journey, covered by the press, became a national sensation and called for a system of long-distance roads.

In the early 1910s, auto trail organizations—most prominently the Lincoln Highway—began to spring up, marking and promoting routes for the new recreation of long-distance automobile travel. The Yellowstone Trail was another of the earliest examples. While many of these organizations worked with towns and states along the route to improve the roadways, others simply chose a route based on towns that were willing to pay dues, put up signs, and did little else.

=== Planning ===
Wisconsin was the first state in the U.S. to number its highways, erecting signs in May 1918. Other states soon followed. In 1922, the New England states got together to establish the six-state New England Interstate Routes.

Behind the scenes, the federal aid program had begun with the passage of the Federal Aid Road Act of 1916, providing 50% monetary support from the federal government for improvement of major roads. The Federal Aid Highway Act of 1921 limited the routes to 7% of each state's roads, while 3 in every 7 roads had to be "interstate in character". Identification of these main roads was completed in 1923.

The American Association of State Highway Officials (AASHO), formed in 1914 to help establish roadway standards, began to plan a system of marked and numbered "interstate highways" at its 1924 meeting. AASHO recommended that the Secretary of Agriculture work with the states to designate these routes.

In March 1925, Secretary Howard M. Gore appointed the Joint Board on Interstate Highways, as recommended by AASHO. The Board was composed of 21 state highway officials and three federal Bureau of Public Roads officials. At the first meeting, on April 20 and 21, the group chose the name "U.S. Highway" as the designation for the routes. They decided that the system would not be limited to the federal-aid network. If the best route did not receive federal funds, it would still be included. The tentative design for the U.S. Route shield was chosen, based on the shield found on the Great Seal of the United States.

The auto trail associations rejected the elimination of the highway names. Six regional meetings were held to hammer out the details—May 15 for the West, May 27 for the Mississippi Valley, June 3 for the Great Lakes, June 8 for the South, June 15 for the North Atlantic, and June 15 for New England. Representatives of the auto trail associations were not able to formally address the meetings. As a compromise, they talked with the Joint Board members. The associations settled on a general agreement with the numbering plans, as named trails would still be included. The tentative system added up to 81,000 miles (130,000 km), 2.8% of the public road mileage at the time.

The 1926 and 1948 versions of the U.S. Route shield

The second full meeting was held August 3 and 4, 1925. At that meeting, discussion was held over the appropriate density of routes. William F. Williams of Massachusetts and Frederick S. Greene of New York favored a system of only major transcontinental highways. Many states recommended a large number of roads of only regional importance. Greene in particular intended New York's system to have four major through routes as an example to the other states. Many states agreed in general with the scope of the system, but believed the Midwest to have added too many routes to the system. The group adopted the shield, with few modifications from the original sketch, at that meeting, and the decision to number rather than name the routes. A preliminary numbering system, with eight major east–west and ten major north–south routes, was deferred to a numbering committee "without instructions".

After working with states to get their approval, the committee expanded the highway system to 75,800 miles (122,000 km), or 2.6% of total mileage, over 50% more than the plan approved on August 4. The skeleton of the numbering plan was suggested on August 27 by Edwin Warley James of the BPR, who matched parity to direction, and laid out a rough grid. Major routes from the earlier map were assigned numbers ending in 0, 1 or 5. 5 was soon relegated to less-major status. Short connections received three-digit numbers based on the main highway from which they spurred. The five-man committee met September 25, and submitted the final report to the Joint Board secretary on October 26. The board sent the report to the Secretary of Agriculture on October 30, and he approved it November 18, 1925.

=== Disagreement and refinement, 1925–26 ===
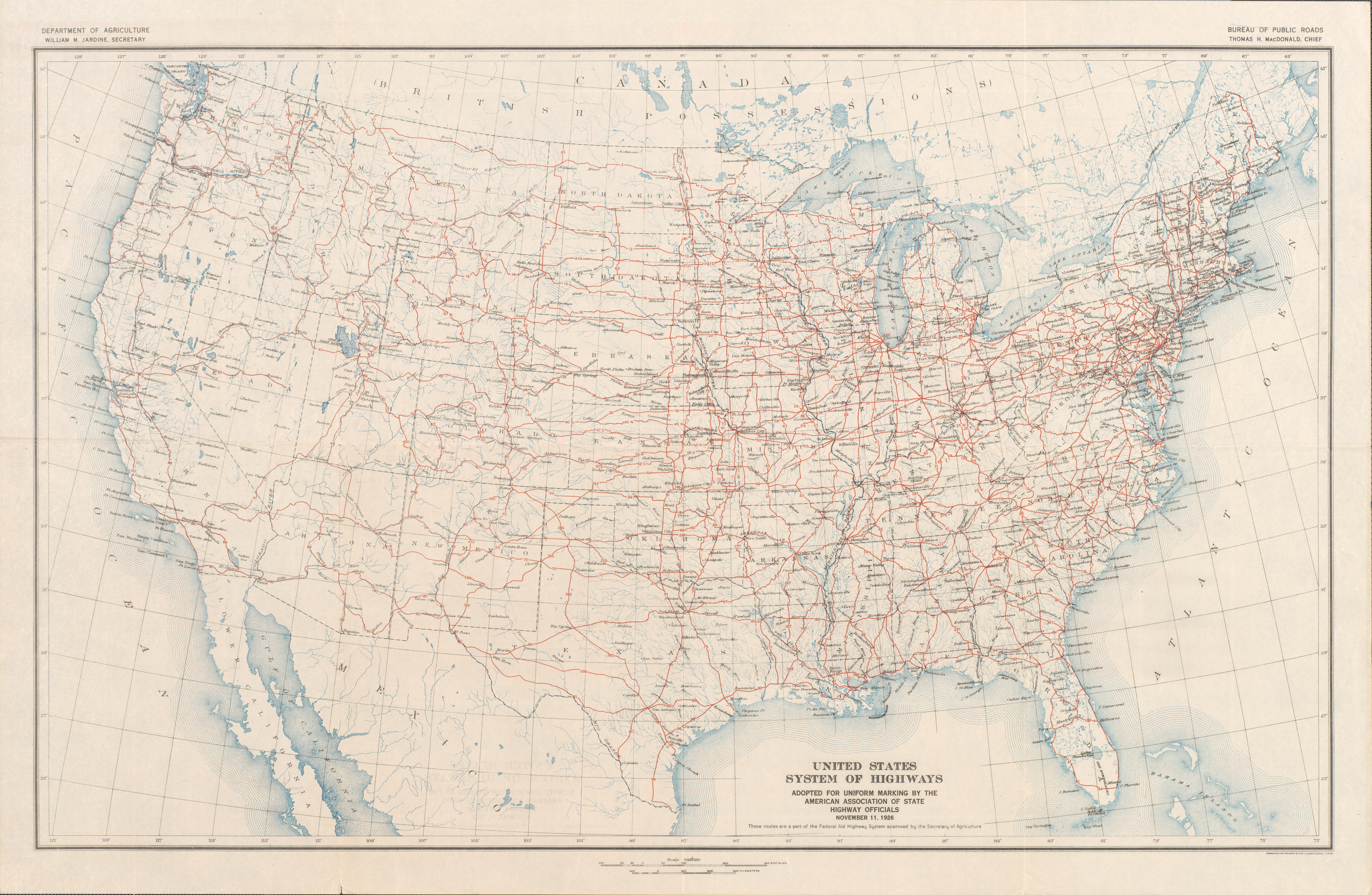
The "final" U.S. Highway plan as approved November 11, 1926

The new system was both praised and criticized by local newspapers, often depending on whether that city was connected to a major route. While the Lincoln Highway Association understood and supported the plan, partly because they were assured of getting the US 30 designation as much as possible, most other trail associations lamented their obsolescence. At their January 14–15, 1926 meeting, AASHO was flooded with complaints.

In the Northeast, New York held out for fewer routes designated as U.S. Highways. The Pennsylvania representative, who had not attended the local meetings, convinced AASHO to add a dense network of routes, which gave six routes termini along the state line. Only US 220 still ends near the state line, and now it ends at an intersection with future I-86. Because US 20 seemed indirect, passing through Yellowstone National Park, Idaho and Oregon requested that US 30 be swapped with US 20 to the Pacific coast.

Many local disputes arose related to the committee's choices between designation of two roughly equal parallel routes, which were often competing auto trails. At their January meeting, AASHO approved the first two of many split routes, specifically US 40 between Manhattan, Kansas and Limon, Colorado and US 50 between Baldwin City, Kansas and Garden City, Kansas. In effect, each of the two routes received the same number, with a directional suffix indicating its relation to the other. These splits were initially shown in the log as—for instance—US 40 North and US 40 South, but were always posted as simply US 40N and US 40S.

The most heated argument was the issue of US 60. The Joint Board had assigned that number to the Chicago-Los Angeles route, which ran more north–south than west–east in Illinois, and then angled sharply to the southwest to Oklahoma City, from where it ran west to Los Angeles. Kentucky strongly objected to this designated route, as it had been left off any of the major east–west routes, instead receiving the US 62 designation. In January 1926, the committee designated this, along with the part of US 52 east of Ashland, Kentucky, as US 60.

They assigned US 62 to the Chicago-Los Angeles route, contingent on the approval of the states along the former US 60. Missouri and Oklahoma objected—Missouri had already printed maps, and Oklahoma had prepared signs. A compromise was proposed, in which US 60 would split at Springfield, Missouri, into US 60E and US 60N, but both sides objected. The final solution resulted in the assignment of US 66 to the Chicago-Los Angeles portion of the U.S. highway, which did not end in zero, but was still seen as a satisfyingly round number. Route 66 came to have a prominent place in popular culture, being featured in song and films.

With 32 states already marking their routes, the plan was approved by AASHO on November 11, 1926. This plan included a number of directionally split routes, several discontinuous routes, including US 6, US 19 and US 50, and some termini at state lines. By the time the first route log was published in April 1927, major numbering changes had been made in Pennsylvania in order to align the routes to the existing auto trails. US 15 was extended across Virginia.

Much of the early criticism of the U.S. Highway System focused on the choice of numbers to designate the highways, rather than names. Some thought a numbered highway system to be cold compared to the more colorful names and historic value of the auto trail systems. The New York Times wrote, "The traveler may shed tears as he drives the Lincoln Highway or dream dreams as he speeds over the Jefferson Highway, but how can he get a 'kick' out of 46, 55 or 33 or 21?". A popular song later promised, "Get your kicks on Route 66!". The writer Ernest McGaffey was quoted as saying, "Logarithms will take the place of legends, and 'hokum' for history."

=== Expansion and adjustment, 1926–1956 ===
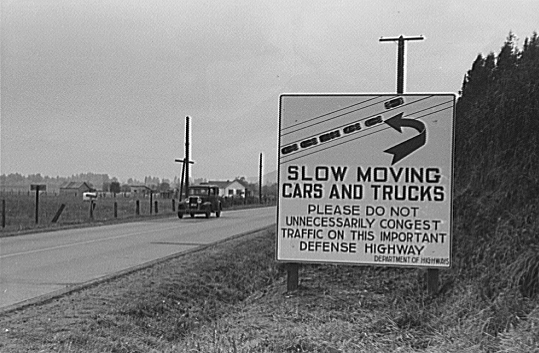
This sign, photographed in 1941 on US 99 between Seattle, Washington, and Portland, Oregon, illustrates one rationale for a federal highway system: national defense.

When the U.S. numbered system was started in 1925, a few optional routings were established which were designated with a suffixed letter after the number indicating "north", "south", "east", or "west". While a few roads in the system are still numbered in this manner, AASHO believes that they should be eliminated wherever possible, by the absorption of one of the optional routes into another route.

In 1934, AASHO tried to eliminate many of the split routes by removing them from the log, and designating one of each pair as a three-digit or alternate route, or in one case US 37. AASHO described its renumbering concept in the October 1934 issue of American Highways:

"Wherever an alternate route is not suitable for its own unique two-digit designation, standard procedure assigns the unqualified number to the older or shorter route, while the other route uses the same number marked by a standard strip above its shield carrying the word 'Alternate'."

Most states adhere to this approach. Some maintain legacy routes that violate the rules in various ways. Examples can be found in California, Mississippi, Nebraska, Oregon, and Tennessee. In 1952, AASHO permanently recognized the splits in US 11, US 19, US 25, US 31, US 45, US 49, US 73, and US 99.

For the most part, the U.S. Routes were the primary means of inter-city vehicle travel. The main exceptions were toll roads such as the Pennsylvania Turnpike and parkway routes such as the Merritt Parkway. Many of the first high-speed roads were U.S. Highways: the Gulf Freeway carried US 75, the Pasadena Freeway carried US 66, and the Pulaski Skyway carries US 1 and US 9.

=== Interstate era, 1956–present ===
The 1961 version of the U.S. Route shield

The Federal Aid Highway Act of 1956 appropriated funding for the Interstate Highway System, to construct a vast network of freeways across the country. By 1957, AASHO had decided to assign a new grid to the new routes, to be numbered in the opposite directions as the U.S. Highway grid. Though the Interstate numbers were to supplement—rather than replace—the U.S. Route numbers, in many cases, especially in the West, the U.S. Highways were rerouted along the new Interstates. Major decommissioning of former routes began with California's highway renumbering in 1964. The 1985 removal of US 66 is often seen as the end of an era of U.S. Highways.

A few major connections not served by Interstate Highways include US 6 from Hartford, Connecticut, to Providence, Rhode Island and US 93 from Phoenix, Arizona to Las Vegas, Nevada, though the latter is planned to be upgraded to Interstate 11. Three state capitals in the contiguous U.S. are served only by U.S. Routes: Dover, Delaware; Jefferson City, Missouri; and Pierre, South Dakota.

In 1995, the National Highway System was defined to include both the Interstate Highway System and other roads designated as important to the nation's economy, defense, and mobility.

AASHTO is eliminating all intrastate U.S. Highways less than 300 miles (480 km) in length "as rapidly as the State Highway Department and the Standing Committee on Highways of the American Association of State Highway and Transportation Officials can reach agreement with reference thereto". New additions to the system must serve more than one state and "substantially meet the current AASHTO design standards". A version of this policy has been in place since 1937.

== The 1925 routes ==
The original major transcontinental routes in 1925, along with the auto trails which they roughly replaced, were as follows:

- US 1, Fort Kent, Maine, to Miami, Florida: Atlantic Highway
- US 11, Rouses Point, New York, to New Orleans, Louisiana
- US 21, Cleveland, Ohio, to Jacksonville, Florida (where it met US 1)
- US 31, Mackinaw City, Michigan, to Mobile, Alabama
- US 41, Copper Harbor, Michigan, to Naples, Florida: Dixie Highway
- US 51, Hurley, Wisconsin, to New Orleans, Louisiana
- US 61, Canadian border north of Grand Portage, Minnesota, to New Orleans, Louisiana
- US 71, International Falls, Minnesota, to Baton Rouge, Louisiana (where it met US 61): Jefferson Highway
- US 81, Canadian border north of Pembina, North Dakota, to Laredo, Texas: Meridian Highway
- US 91, Great Falls, Montana, to south of Las Vegas, Nevada
- US 101, Port Angeles, Washington, to San Diego, California: Pacific Highway
- US 2, Houlton, Maine, to Bonners Ferry, Idaho
- US 10, Detroit, Michigan, to Seattle, Washington: National Parks Highway
- US 20, Boston, Massachusetts, to Newport, Oregon
- US 30, Atlantic City, New Jersey: White Horse Pike, to Salt Lake City, Utah: Lincoln Highway
- US 40, Atlantic City, New Jersey: Black Horse Pike, to San Francisco, California: Victory Highway
- US 50, Annapolis, Maryland, to Wadsworth, Nevada (where it met US 40)
- US 60, Chicago, Illinois, to Los Angeles, California
- US 70, Morehead City, North Carolina, to Holbrook, Arizona (where it met US 60)
- US 80, Savannah, Georgia, to San Diego, California: Dixie Overland Highway
- US 90, Jacksonville, Florida to Van Horn, Texas, (where it met US 80): Old Spanish Trail

US 10, US 60, and US 90 only ran about two thirds of the way across the country, while US 11 and US 60 ran significantly diagonally. US 60's violation of two of the conventions would prove to be one of the major sticking points; US 60 eventually was designated as US 66 in 1926, and later it became a part of popular culture. US 101 continues east and then south to end at Olympia, Washington. The western terminus of US 2 is now at Everett, Washington.

== See also ==
- New England road marking system
- United States Bicycle Route System
