= U.S. Route shield =

Highway shield

Major revisions of the U.S. Route shield from 1926 to 1971 (last revision)

The U.S. Route shield is the highway marker used for United States Numbered Highways. Since the first U.S. Route signs were installed in 1926, the general symbology has remained the same, but many changes have been made in the details. Originally, the shield included the name of the state in which the sign was erected and the letters "U S" on a shield-shaped sign. Over time, the shield has been simplified to consist of a white shield outline on a black square background, containing only a black route number. However, because each state is responsible for the production and maintenance of U.S. Route shields, several variants of the shield have existed over the years.

== History ==
=== Development ===
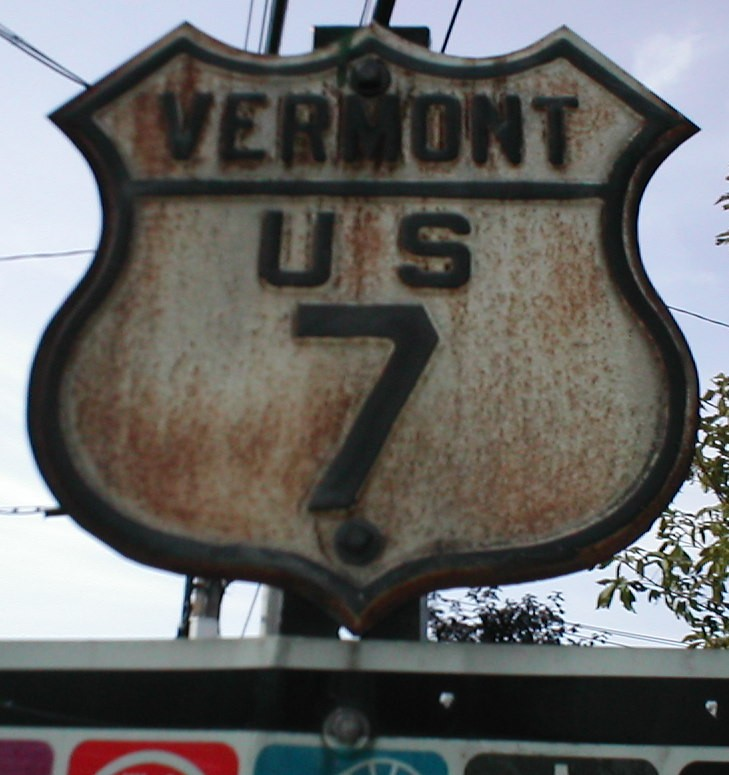
Original-style Vermont US 7 shield with embossed features

The U.S. Route shield was developed during the first meeting of the Joint Board on Interstate Highways, a panel appointed by Howard M. Gore, the Secretary of Agriculture, for the purposes of establishing a nationwide highway system. During the meeting, held at the Bureau of Public Roads offices in Washington, D.C., on April 20, 1925, board member Lou A. Boulay of Ohio was credited with suggesting the use of a shield, inspired by that on the Great Seal of the United States, with the letters "U.S.A." and the route number as a route marker. The board carried the motion to use a shield as the marker.

The Joint Board did not discuss the route shield further until the next day, April 21. At that time, E.W. James (Chief of the BPR's Division of Design and secretary of the Joint Board) and Frank F. Rogers of Michigan sketched a possible implementation of the shield. Rogers was also quoted as saying "Each state should have the right to insert the name of the state in the upper part of the shield to be adopted." James and Rogers presented their shield sketch to the board, and it was approved as a tentative design. Samples were sent for comment to all 48 states.

The shield was next discussed during the meeting of August 3. Upon motion by Cyrus Avery of Oklahoma, the board officially adopted the shield proposed at the April 21 meeting, having received general support from the states. A debate then ensued regarding the inclusion of the state name. W.O. Hotchkiss of Wisconsin, who was in favor of removing the state name, said "We want to emphasize the U.S., not the state. The shield and U.S. symbolized what we are marking." The Joint Board voted 10–9 to eliminate the state name.

Outside of the official meeting, members of the board discussed the state name issue further. Some members, particularly those from the South, felt it would be difficult to get local support for the U.S. Route System without it, because the states were required to pay for the signage. Some state legislatures had also legally bound state route numbers to certain corridors, and it was thought that including the state name might make the legislators more amenable to renumbering them to U.S. Route numbers. The following day, August 4, upon a motion of Robert M. Morton of California, the U.S. shield including the state name was approved without debate.

=== Original version ===
Example of an original U.S. Route shield, with the state name of "Michigan" and route number of "27" displayed in the original block font

The original design of the shield was presented in the January 1927 edition of the Manual and Specifications for the Manufacture, Display, and Erection of U.S. Standard Road Markers and Signs, the precursor to the Manual on Uniform Traffic Control Devices (MUTCD), published by the American Association of State Highway Officials (AASHO). (Note: AASHO was renamed the American Association of State Highway and Transportation Officials (AASHTO) on November 11, 1973.) The background of the shield was specified as white while the text legend and borders were black. The shield was specified with a height of 16 inches (41 cm) and a width of 16.5 inches (42 cm). The surface of the shield was itself in the shape of the shield, that is, the metal was cut out in the shape of the shield. A border of 3/8 inch (0.95 cm) formed the outline of the shield, with a crossbar of the same width dividing the crown from the main body of the shield.

The name of the state erecting the shield was displayed 2 inches (5.1 cm) high in the crown, above the crossbar. Immediately below the crossbar were the letters "U S", also 2 inches (5.1 cm) high. Below this was the route number, 5 inches (13 cm) tall. A variant of the shield, intended for city use, measured slightly smaller at 11 23/32 by 11 11/32 inches (29.8 cm × 28.8 cm). This version of the shield featured a simplified legend, with "U S" moved to the crown of the shield and the state name omitted. The manual also allowed for the city variant of the shield to be stenciled on culverts and bridge posts.

A standardized block typeface was used to simplify the painting process, to allow illiterate signpainters to be employed. Much like the modern FHWA Series typefaces, several levels of condensation were available, from Series A (the narrowest) up to Series F (the widest). Because the standardized font was often made available to the states in die-punch form, shields were usually embossed.

=== 1948 version ===
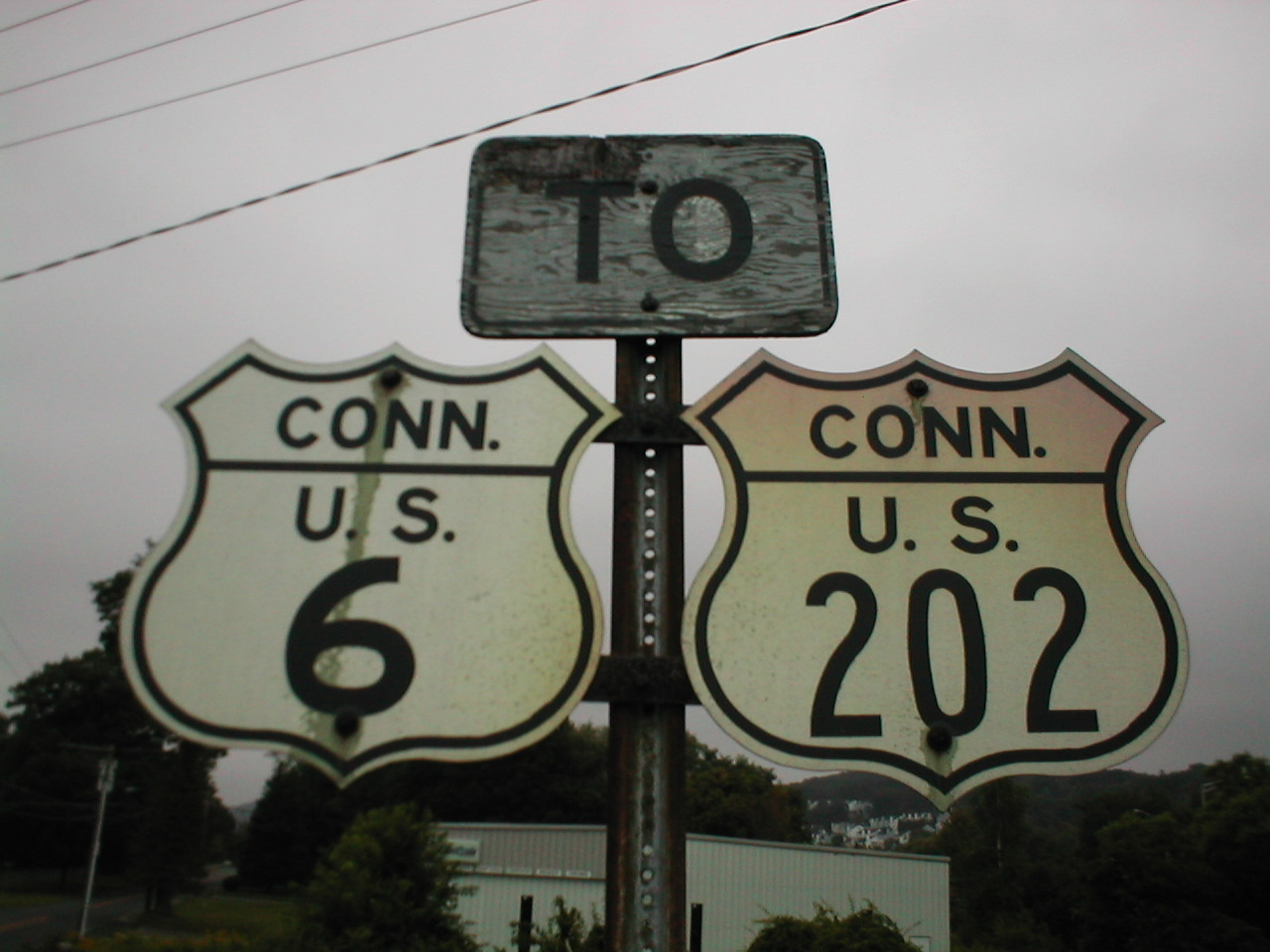
1948-style shields for US 6 and US 202 in Connecticut, with the state name abbreviated

The 1948 edition of the MUTCD introduced the first change to the U.S. Route shield since its appearance in the 1927 AASHO manual. The old block typefaces were replaced by the modern FHWA Series typefaces, which had since been developed. The shield shape and size, letter height, and layout was otherwise identical to the prior version.

The 1948 MUTCD also included a specification for an "oversize" route marker, intended for major highway junctions in rural areas, as well as for special emphasis in urban areas. This shield was printed on a square blank, 24 by 24 inches (61 cm × 61 cm), twice the size of the cutout shield. This version of the shield was much simplified, with the crossbar, state name, and "U S" omitted. The portion of the blank falling outside of the shield outline was white.

=== 1961 version ===
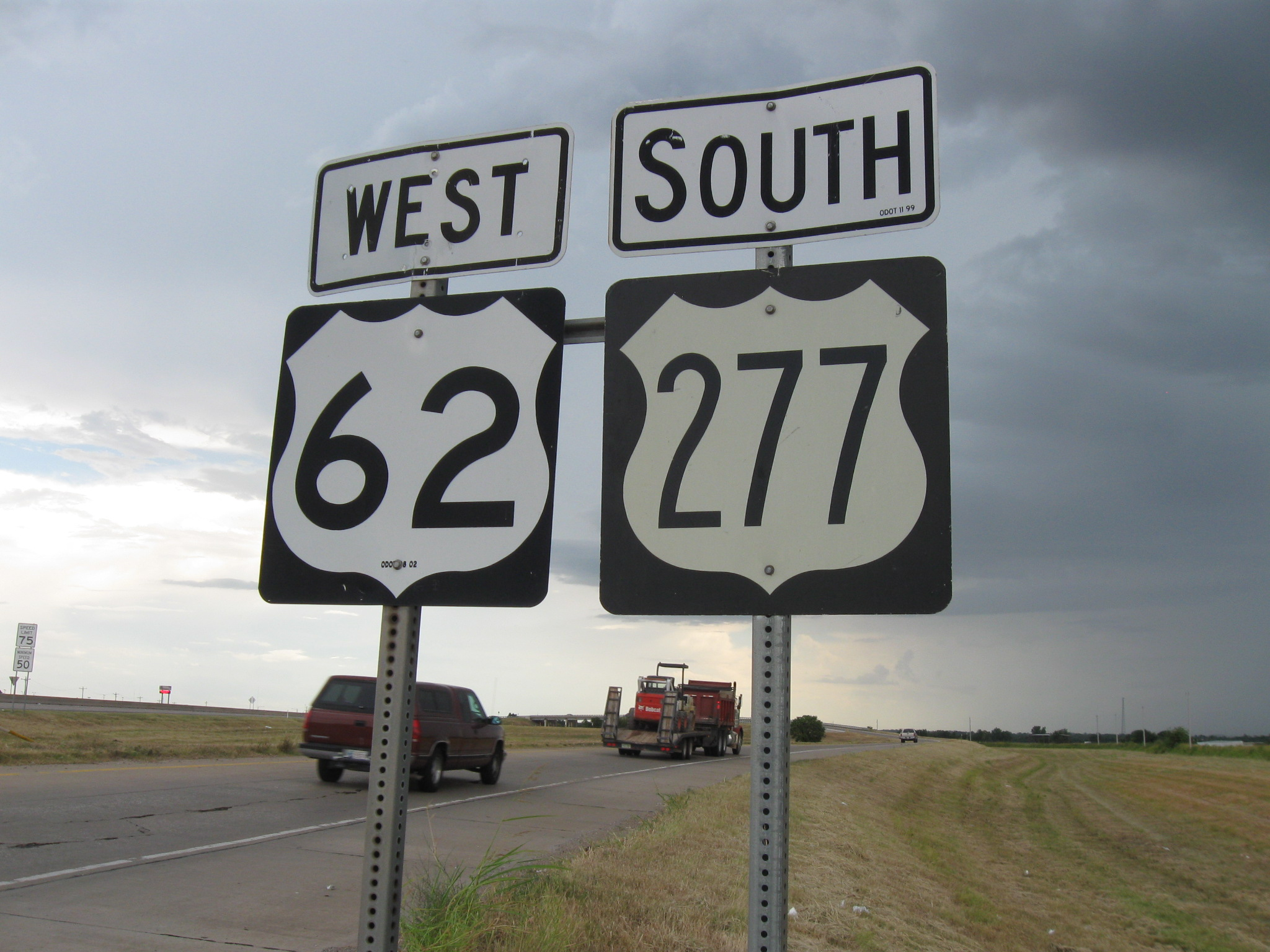
Modern (left) and 1961 (right) shields in Newcastle, Oklahoma; the older shield uses the FHWA Series A typeface, which has since been discontinued.

The next version of the MUTCD, the 1961 edition, made further alterations to the U.S. route shield. The 16-by-16-inch (41 cm × 41 cm) cutout shield was retained, but its use was restricted to reassurance marker contexts. Turn, junction, and trailblazer shields were to always use the oversize marker, which had been modified to use a black, rather than white, background surrounding the shield.

A supplemental AASHO publication outlining signage and pavement markings on the nascent Interstate Highway System, also published in 1961, included a variant of the shield intended for freeway use (such as for U.S. routes running concurrently with Interstates). This shield, the same size as the oversize marker, was a simplified cutout shield, containing only the outer border, "U S", and the route marker. Unlike the federally specified shields up to this point, this specification included a wider version, 28 by 24 inches (71 cm × 61 cm) for three-digit routes. This version of the shield is still used in California, the only state to still specify a cutout shield.

== Current design ==
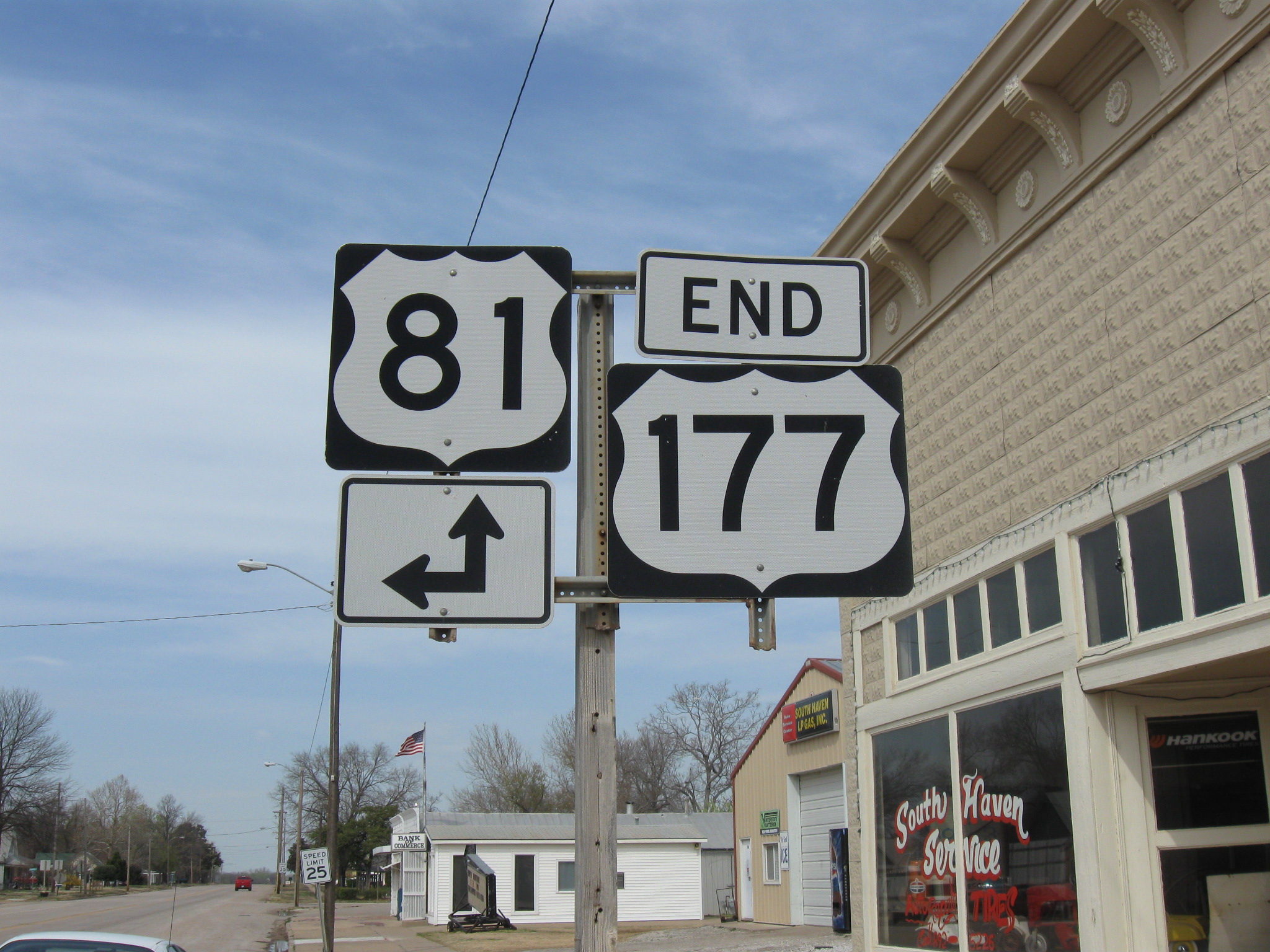
Wide and narrow 1971-style U.S. route shields

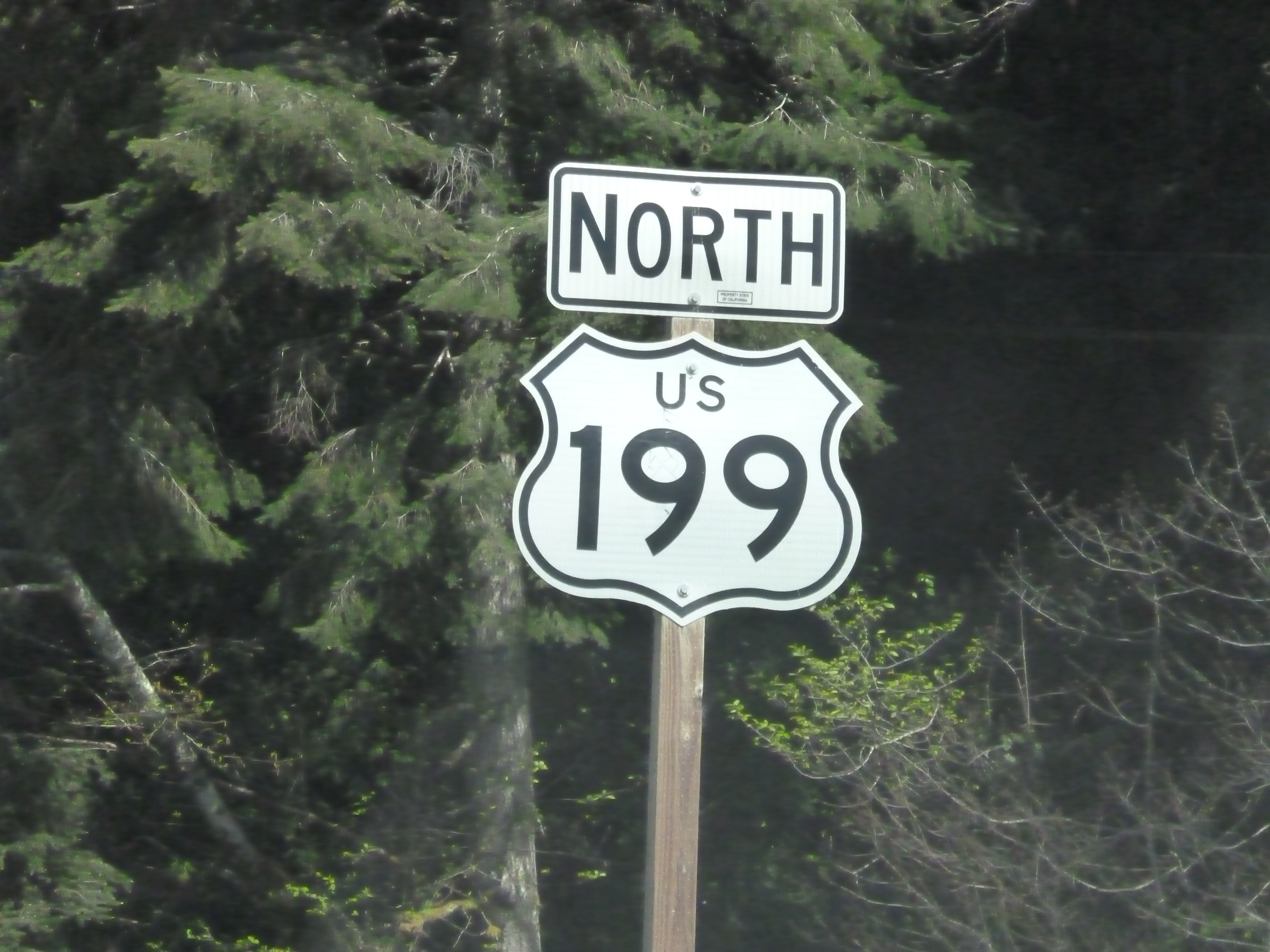
Cutout US 199 shield in California

The current design of the U.S. Route shield was introduced in the 1971 MUTCD. The shield outline is slightly modified from the 1961 version, allowing for more white space within the shield. For the first time, the federal specification also included a wide version of the shield for three-digit routes, eliminating the need to use the condensed fonts for many route numbers. The 1971 MUTCD also discontinued the 16-by-16-inch (41 cm × 41 cm) cutout shield for reassurance purposes, leaving only the 24-by-24-inch (61 cm × 61 cm) and 24-by-30-inch (61 cm × 76 cm) markers for all purposes.

In the 2009 MUTCD, the U.S. Route shield is assigned catalog number M1-4 and is discussed in Section 2D.11. The 24-by-24-inch (61 cm × 61 cm) and 24-by-30-inch (61 cm × 76 cm) sizes are specified as minimums. The MUTCD suggests that when used as components of guide signs, the black background of the shields should be omitted, leaving only the white shield shape. However, deviations are common, especially in New Jersey, which consistently includes the black background on both U.S. Route shields and state route markers on its guide signs, though inclusion of the background and thinning is being phased out on many new sign installations in New Jersey as of the late 2000s.

== Variations ==
Directional colored U.S. Route shields found in Arizona during the 1950s

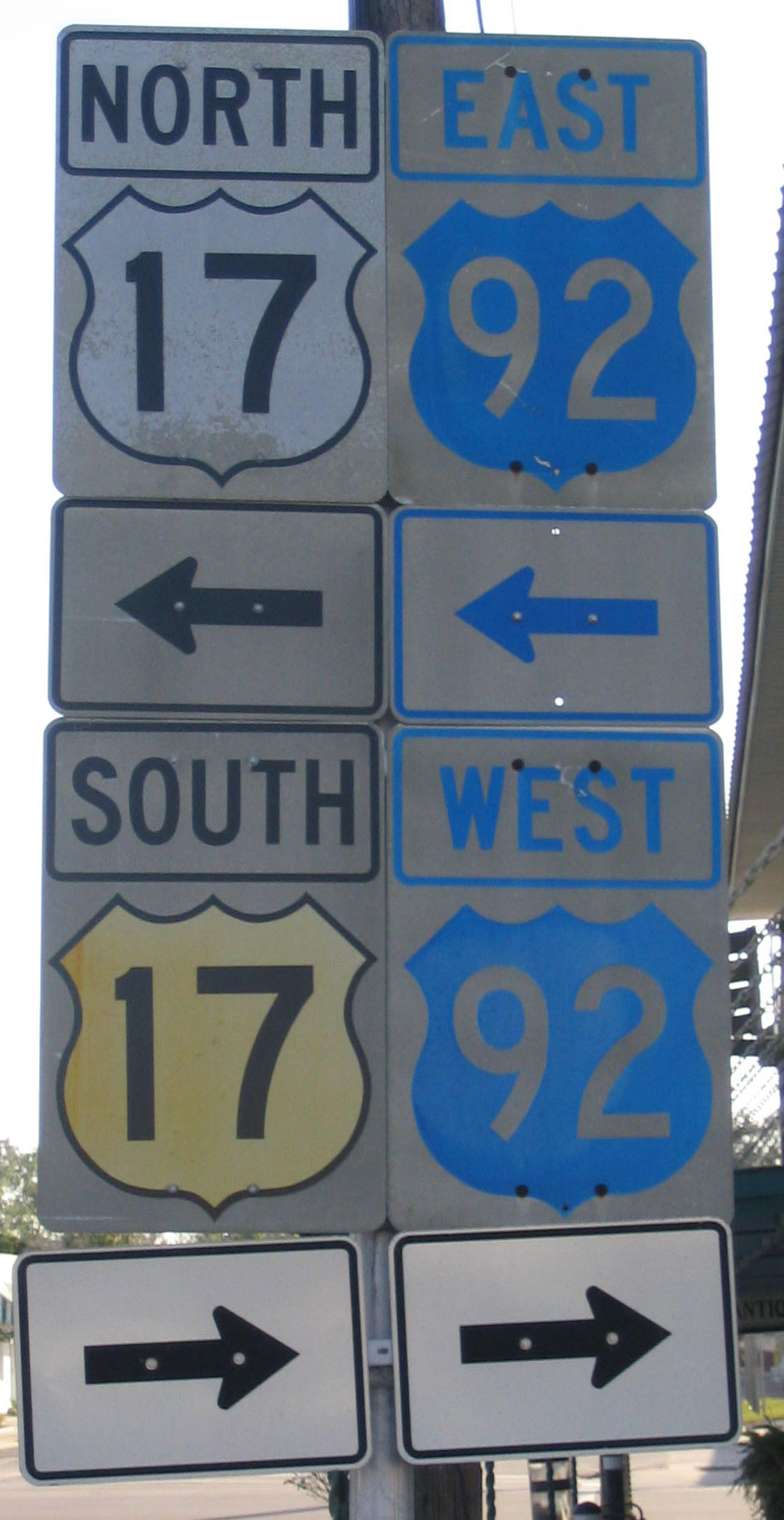
Yellow and blue US 17 and US 92 shields in Florida

Several states have experimented with variations on the U.S. Route shield to aid in navigation. Some have used color to denote additional information besides just the route class and number. Arizona experimented with colors indicating the signed cardinal direction of the highway (orange for north, green for south, brown for east, and blue for west). Florida, too, used colored signs for its U.S. Highways beginning in 1956, with each highway retaining a single color for its entire length in the state. No two routes using the same color crossed, though an extension of US 192 took it to US 27 (both green). In the 1980s the MUTCD was revised so that these signs were no longer eligible for federal funds. On August 27, 1993, the decision was made to stop producing colored signs. In California, the design is more like the pre-1961 version. The design has no black background on their U.S. Highway shield. It is instead designed with a white shield with a black outline. Centered on the top are the letters "US". Some states that are part of the Appalachian Development Highway System feature U.S. Highway signs with blue numbers on a white shield, set against a blue background.

During the era of the 1948 shield, states often modified its design. Several states omitted the letters "U S", leaving only the state name and route number. Other states moved the letters "U S" into the crown of the shield, along with the state name, which was often abbreviated.

Marker used for business U.S. Routes in Maryland

Many U.S. Highways have loop or spur routes sharing the same number, known as special routes. These routes typically use the same shield as the mainline route with a "banner" indicating the type of route above the shield. Some states will occasionally indicate the type of the route directly on the shield itself, often in the crown of the shield. Maryland uses green shields with the word "BUSINESS" in the shield's crown for U.S. business routes, reflecting a similar practice used nationwide for business Interstate shields.

On some Business U.S. Routes in Illinois, mostly on Business US 51 in the Bloomington–Normal area, the standard black on white US Route shield is used but the abbreviation "BUSN" is included in smaller letters at the top of the shield. This is also the case for the markers used on signs on nearby Interstates.

== See also ==
- Highway shield
- Interstate shield
