= Kreisstraße =

Class of road in Germany

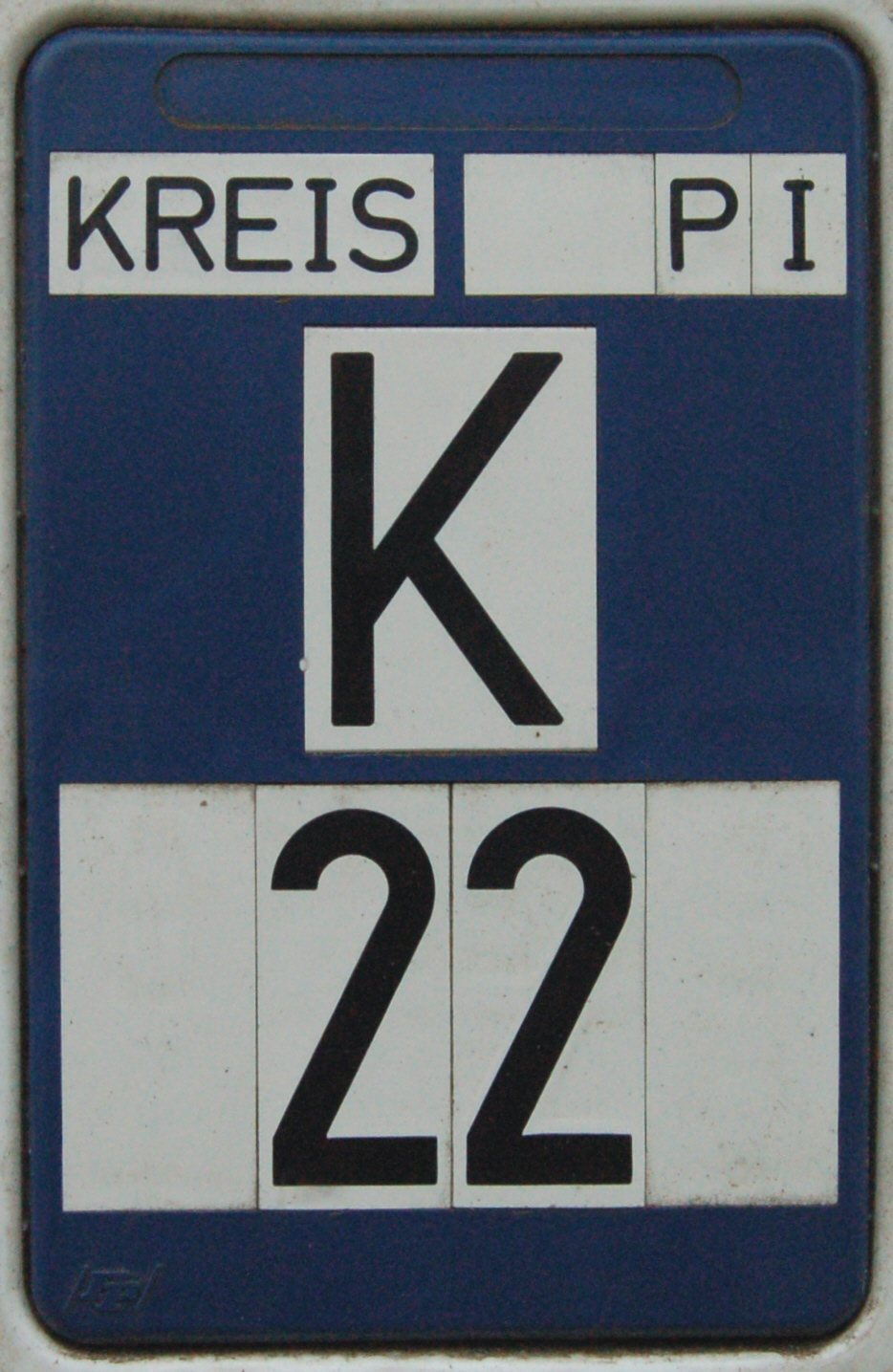
Sign for Kreisstraße 22 (K 22) on a marker post

A Kreisstraße (German pronunciation: [ˈkʁaɪsˌʃtʁaːsə], lit. 'district road' or 'county road') is a class of road in Germany. It carries traffic between the towns and villages within a Kreis or district or between two neighbouring districts. In importance, the Kreisstraße ranks below a Landesstraße (or, in Bavaria and Saxony, a Staatstraße, i.e. a state road), but above a Gemeindestraße or "local road". Kreisstraßen are usually the responsibility of the respective rural district (Landkreis) or urban district (Kreisfreie Stadt), with the exception of high streets through larger towns and villages. Kreisstraßen are usually dual-lane roads but, in a few cases, can be built as limited-access dual carriageways in densely populated areas.

== Numbering ==
Unlike local roads (Gemeindestraßen) the Kreisstraßen are invariably numbered, but their numbering is not shown on signs. The abbreviation is a prefixed capital letter K followed by a serial number. In most states the car number plate prefix for the district is placed in front of the road number instead, for example in Bavaria. The Kreisstraßen are numbered in the individual federal states as follows:

State	System
Baden-Württemberg	state-based numbering system, always four digits (e.g. K 1419, K 2842 and K 4366), the first two digits indicate the district
Bavaria	district-based numbering system (e.g. NU 1 to NU 19 in the district of Neu-Ulm, NES 1 to NES 54 in the district of Rhön-Grabfeld)
Berlin	no Kreisstraßen
Brandenburg	state-based numbering system, always four digits (e.g. K 6307, K 6813 and K 7329), the first two digits indicate the district
Bremen	no Kreisstraßen
Hamburg	no Kreisstraßen
Hesse	state-based numbering system (e.g. K 11, K 138 and K 180)
Lower Saxony	district-based numbering system (e.g. K 6, K 71 and K 304)
Mecklenburg-Vorpommern	district-based numbering system
North Rhine-Westphalia	district-based numbering system (e.g. K 8, K 27 and K 70), the numbering system is retained when roads cross the boundaries
Rhineland-Palatinate	district-based numbering system (e.g. K 12, K 29 and K 58)
Saarland	no Kreisstraßen
Saxony	state-based numbering system, always four digits (e.g. K 6201, K 8053 and K 9204), the first two digits indicate the district
Saxony-Anhalt	state-based numbering system, always four digits (e.g. K 1002, K 1227 and K 2074)
Schleswig-Holstein	district-based numbering system (e.g. K 1, K 10)
Thuringia	district-based numbering (e.g. K 9, K 19 and K 112)

== See also ==
- Autobahn
- Bundesstraße
- Landesstraße
- Gemeindestraße

== Sources ==
- Forschungsgesellschaft für Straßen- und Verkehrswesen (2000), Begriffsbestimmungen, Teil: Verkehrsplanung, Straßenentwurf und Straßenbetrieb (in German), Köln: FGSV Verlag, p. 29
