= Roads in Thailand =

Roads in Thailand may refer to:

- Controlled-access highways in Thailand
  - Thai Expressway network
  - Thai motorway network
  - Elevated Tollway
- Thai highway network
