= Municipal road =

Road type

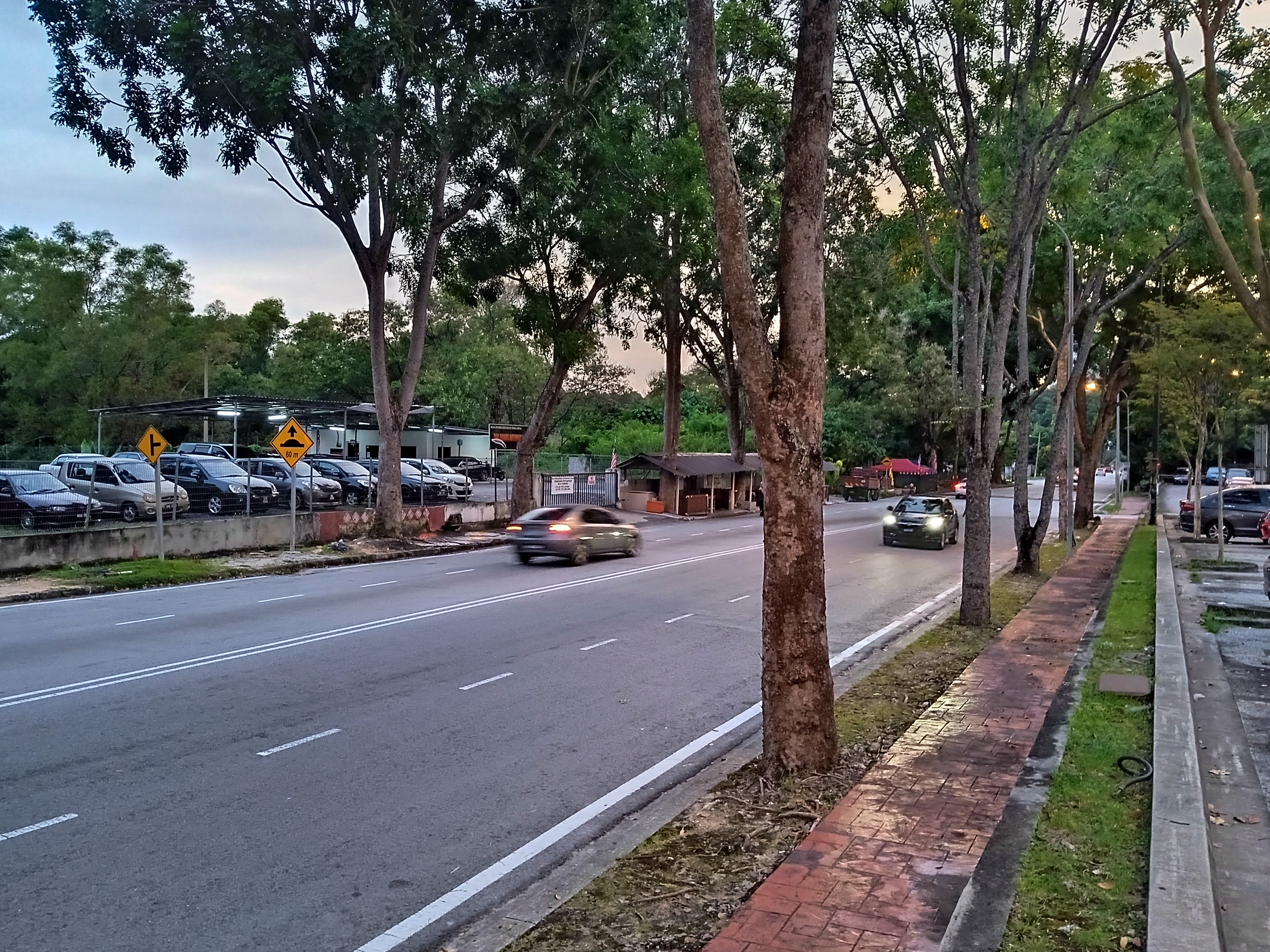
A municipal road in Malaysia.

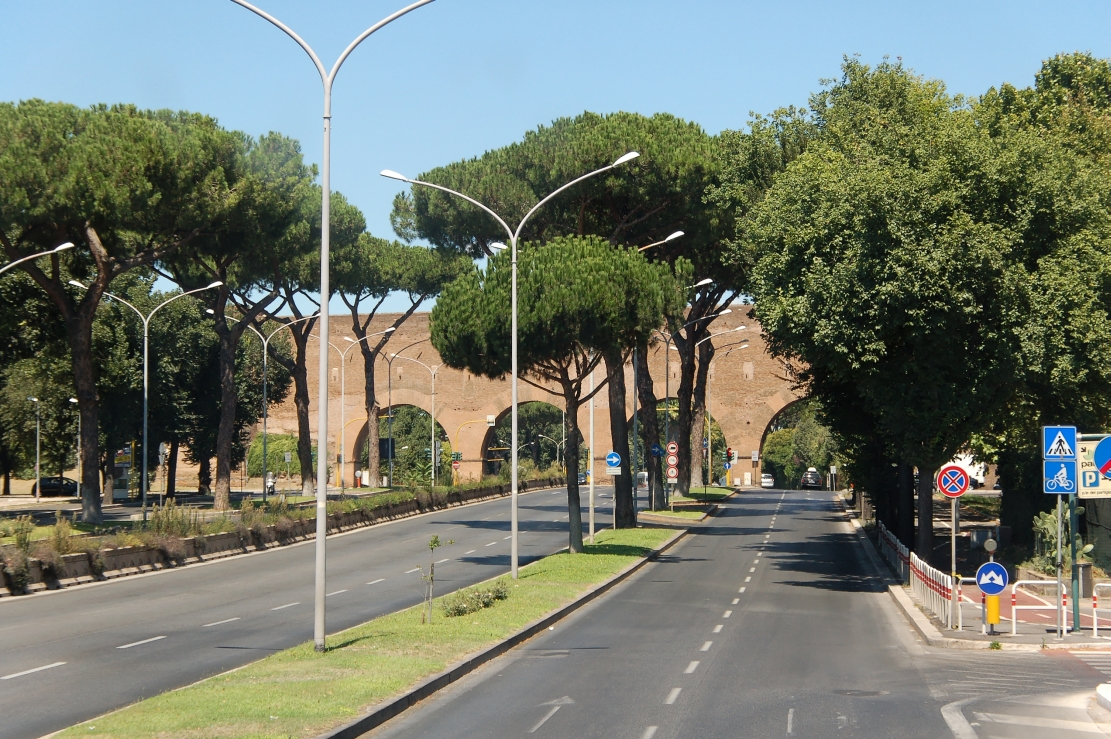
Via Cristoforo Colombo at Porta Ardeatina, a strada comunale in Rome, Italy.

Municipal road or municipal way is or was a category of roads which are owned and/or maintained by municipalities. Generally, transit sections of higher-class roads through the built-up area is counted as part of the higher-class road, not as a municipal road. Some countries use the term local road or local communication in similar sense.

== Situation in various countries ==
- Gemeindestraße in Germany. There are distinguished Ortsstraßen (local roads) in built-up area and Gemeindeverbindungsstraßen (GVS, roads of municipal connection) for connection of municipalities or municipal parts. GVSs exist in several bundeslands only, e.g. Bavaria and Baden-Württemberg.
- Gemeindestraße in Austria
- Gemeindestraße in Switzerland; this classification express who is the administrator only; it is independent on the importance classification (main roads, secondary roads).
- route communale in France
- strada comunale in Italy. Italian municipal roads are maintained by comuni.
- drum comunal (DC) in Romania
- droga gminna in Poland; municipal road can belong to one of 5 classes by traffic importance: GP (drogi główne ruchu przyspieszonego; main roads of accelerated traffic), G (drogi główne, main roads), Z (drogi zbiorcze, collection roads), L (drogi lokalne, local roads), D (drogi dojazdowe, access roads). A municipal road cannot belong to categories S (drogi ekspresowe, expressways) nor A (autostrady, freeways).
- obecní silnice or obecní cesta in Czech lands and Slovakia (in Czechoslovakia until 1961), Zakarpattia and other countries of Austria-Hungary; municipalities were constituted in 1850 in Austria-Hungary; road law was created separately for individual countries of the empire (Bohemia, Moravia, Czech Silesia etc.) in 1860s and 1870s. In Czechoslovakia (and consequently in separated Czechia and Slovakia), the term was replaced with the new concept "místní komunikace" (local communication) since 1961.
- Municipal Road information for Victoria Australia

== See also ==
- Hierarchy of roads
