= Reassurance marker =

Type of traffic sign that confirms the identity of the route being traveled

A reassurance marker or confirming marker is a type of traffic sign that confirms the identity of the route being traveled on. It does not provide information found on other types of road signs, such as distances traveled, distances to other locations or upcoming intersections, as is done by highway location markers.

It is a highway shield, usually with a cardinal direction sign, that repeats the name or number of the current route. They are typically posted at intervals alongside a numbered highway.

== North America ==
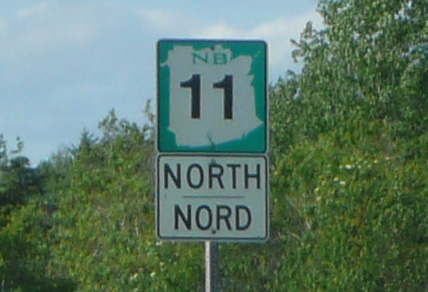
Reassurance markers on New Brunswick's provincial highways feature bilingual (English/French) direction tabs.

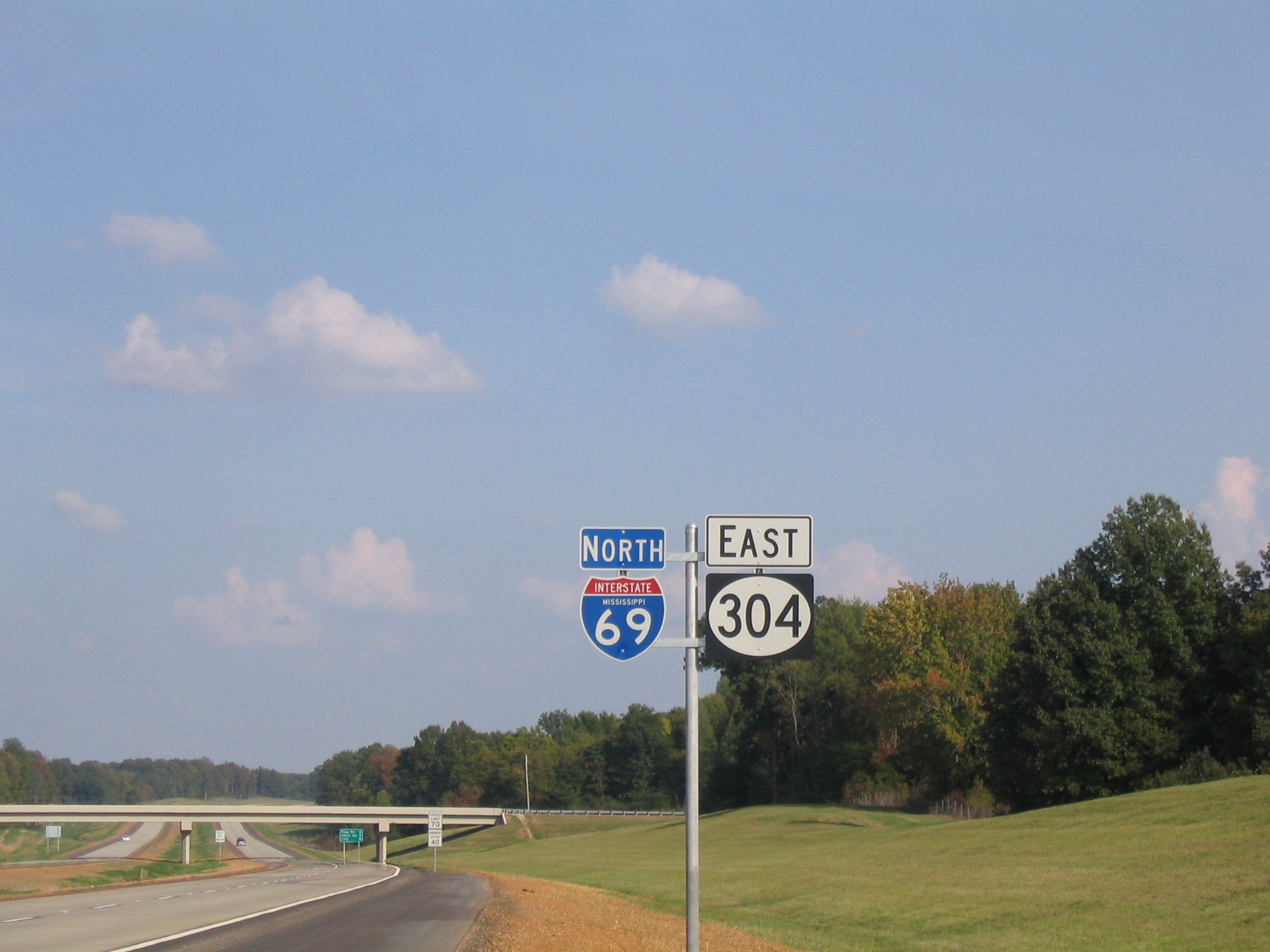
Reassurance shields on a freeway in Mississippi

In the United States and Canada, reassurance markers (also called reassurance shields or confirming shields) usually take the form of a shield displaying the road number on an elevated pole, with a plate above or below it indicating the "official" direction of that side of the route. (The official long-range direction may differ from the short-range direction; for example, a large stretch of I-90 near Buffalo, New York runs north–south, although the route is officially east–west.) The direction portion of the sign confirms that the driver is going the right way along the desired road. On larger roads, reassurance markers are sometimes posted on a sign that is elevated on a gantry.

In the United States, reassurance shields are defined in Section 2D.31 of the Manual on Uniform Traffic Control Devices (MUTCD). The MUTCD recommends that reassurance assemblies be placed:

- 25–200 feet (8–61 m) after intersections of numbered highways
- Between intersections in urban areas as needed
- After leaving the limits of any incorporated city or town
- Periodically in other places for reassurance purposes

The MUTCD requires a cardinal directional sign to be posted with the route shield to further reassure travelers that they are traveling the correct direction on their route. However, this standard is not always followed, especially in urban areas. One example of this is found in the Hampton Roads area of Virginia, where directional signs for Interstate 64 are not posted between the road's eastern terminus in Chesapeake and Interstate 264 in Norfolk, because the road travels in the opposite compass direction from its official designation (although the route in the Norfolk-to-Chesapeake direction is a continuation of I-64 east, it travels westward at that point).

== Europe ==
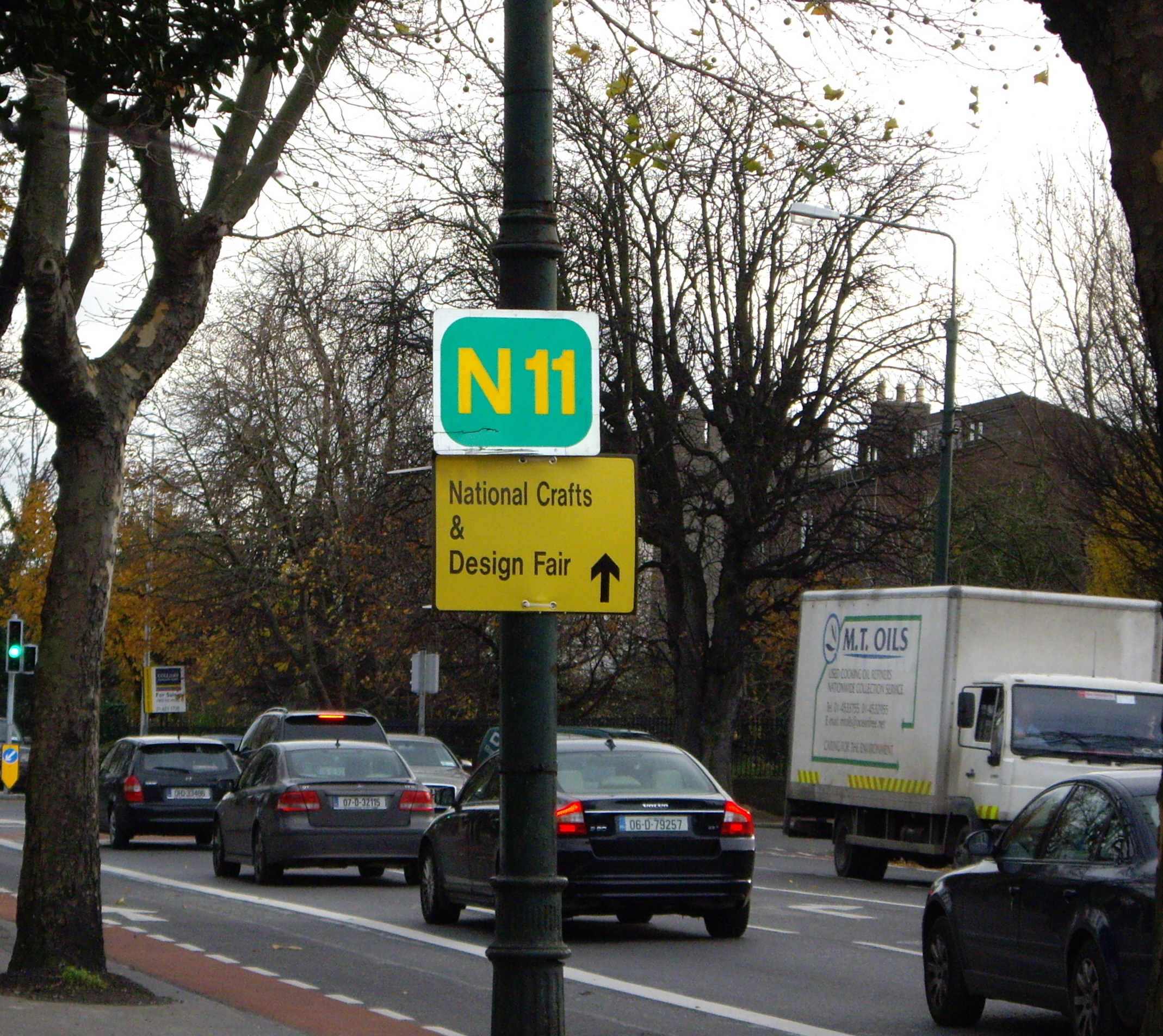
A route marker sign attached to a lamp post on Leeson Street, Dublin, on what was formerly the N11 (now the R138)

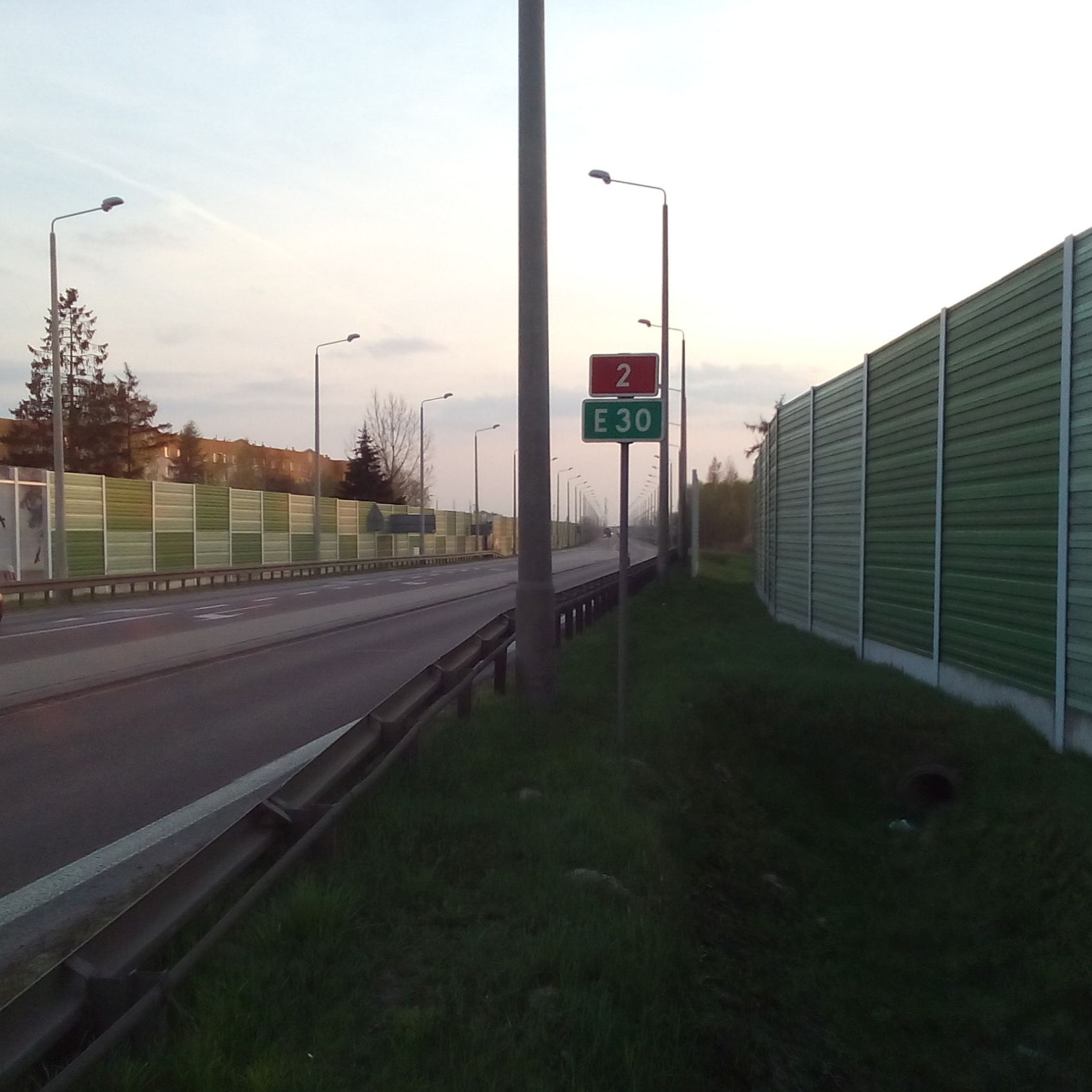
A route marker sign in Biała Podlaska, Poland on national road 2 that has concurrency with European route E30

The Vienna Convention on Road Signs and Signals specifies that "road identification signs" consist of the route number framed in a rectangle, a shield, or the relevant state's route classification symbol (if one exists). The extent to which such signs are used varies between countries.

In the Republic of Ireland, such signs are known as route markers and typically appear above route confirmatory signs. They may, however, appear on their own on long stretches of road or where a route confirmatory sign cannot be provided. On motorways and national roads, route markers are placed midway between two route confirmatory signs if they are more than six kilometres apart.

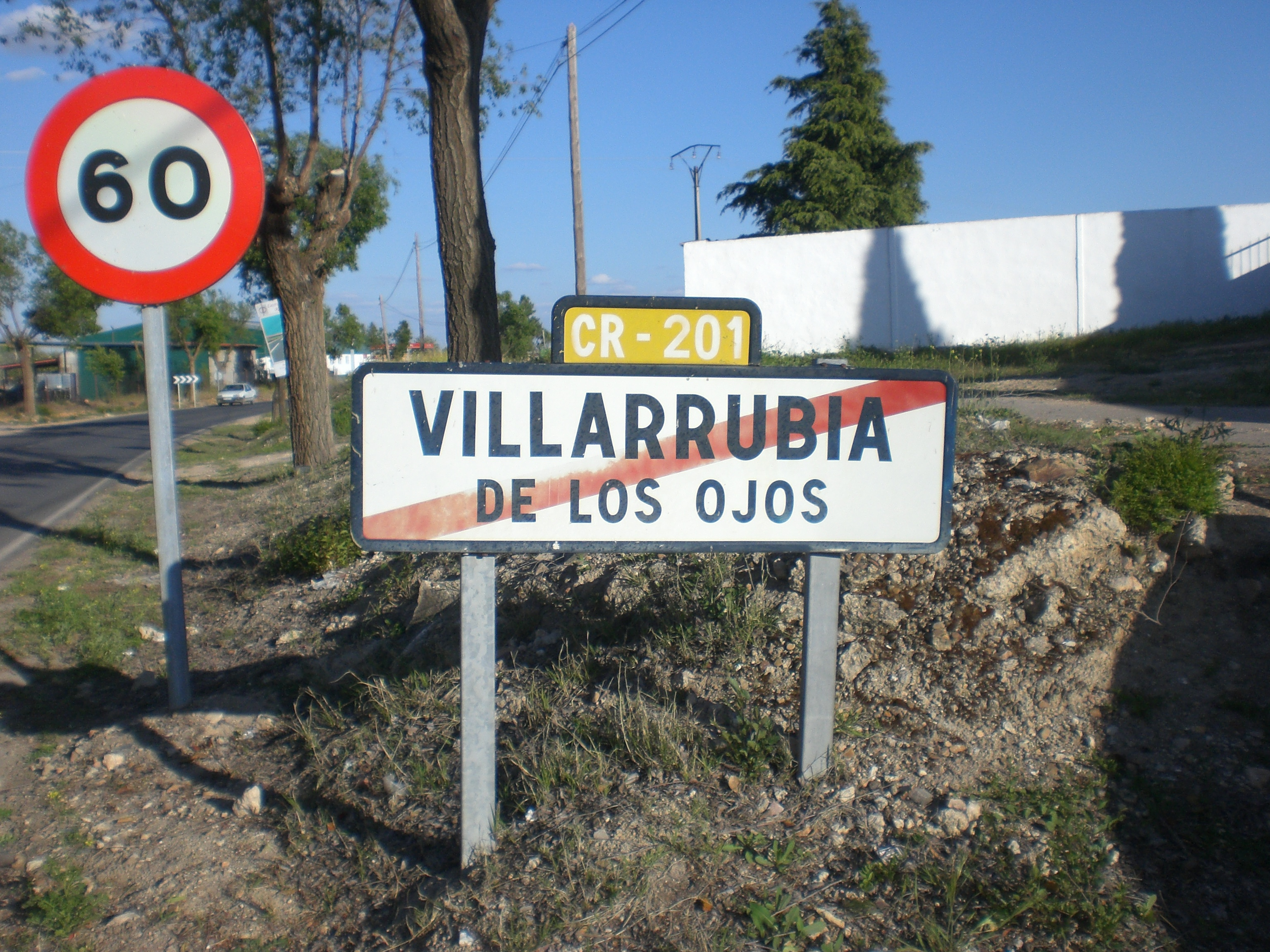
A simple identification sign attached to a town exit sign in Villarrubia de los Ojos, Ciudad Real, Spain

== See also ==
- Historical marker
- Trail blaze
