= Thuit =

Thuit or Tuit may refer to:

== Places in Eure, France ==
- Thuit-Hébert
- Le Thuit, Eure
- Le Thuit-Anger
- Le Thuit-de-l'Oison
- Le Thuit-Signol
- Le Thuit-Simer
- Port-Tuit, the medieval name of Vieux-Port

== Other ==
- Tashkent University of Information Technologies (TUIT)
- Dolston Tuit (born 1986), West Indian cricketer
- Len Tuit (1911–1976), Australian road transport and tourism pioneer

== See also ==
- Risteárd de Tiúit (Richard (de) Tuite), an Irish lord of Hiberno-Norman descent
- Thwaite (placename element)
