= Thwaite (placename element) =

Placename element

Thwaite is a common element of placenames in North West England, and Yorkshire. It is also found elsewhere in England, including two places called Thwaite in Norfolk and one in Suffolk. It is most often found as a suffix. It is a common element of field names, as well as settlement names. It is most frequent in the North West, where some 80 examples are found in Cumberland, at least 30 in Westmorland, about 40 in Lancashire and 30 in the North Riding, whilst it is common in the western parts of the West Riding. Elsewhere in England it is rare, only three examples occurring in the East Riding and seven in Nottinghamshire.

The name is usually from Old Norse thveit (also written þveit), but sometimes from Old Danish thwēt, both meaning "clearing" or "meadow".

The element is also found in Normandy. In the Eure department alone there are at least five placenames with the same thveit root and meaning "clearing in a wooded area", locally represented as Thuit: Le Thuit; Thuit-Hébert; Le Thuit-Simer; Le Thuit-Signol; Le Thuit-Anger. In total there are 89 placenames in Normandy with 'Tuit' in them.

In Orkney and Shetland the element appears as Twatt. In Norway, the element appears as Tveit (Nynorsk) or Tvedt (Dano-Norwegian). In Sweden the word survives in the placename Tveta, denoting for instance a hundred in Småland province and parishes in Småland, Värmland and Södermanland.

== See also ==
- Thwaite (disambiguation)
- Thuit (disambiguation)
