= Place names considered unusual =

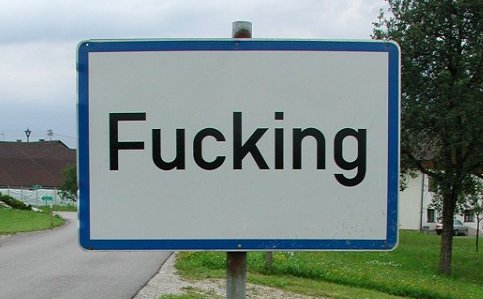
Fucking, Austria. The village was renamed in 2021 to "Fugging".

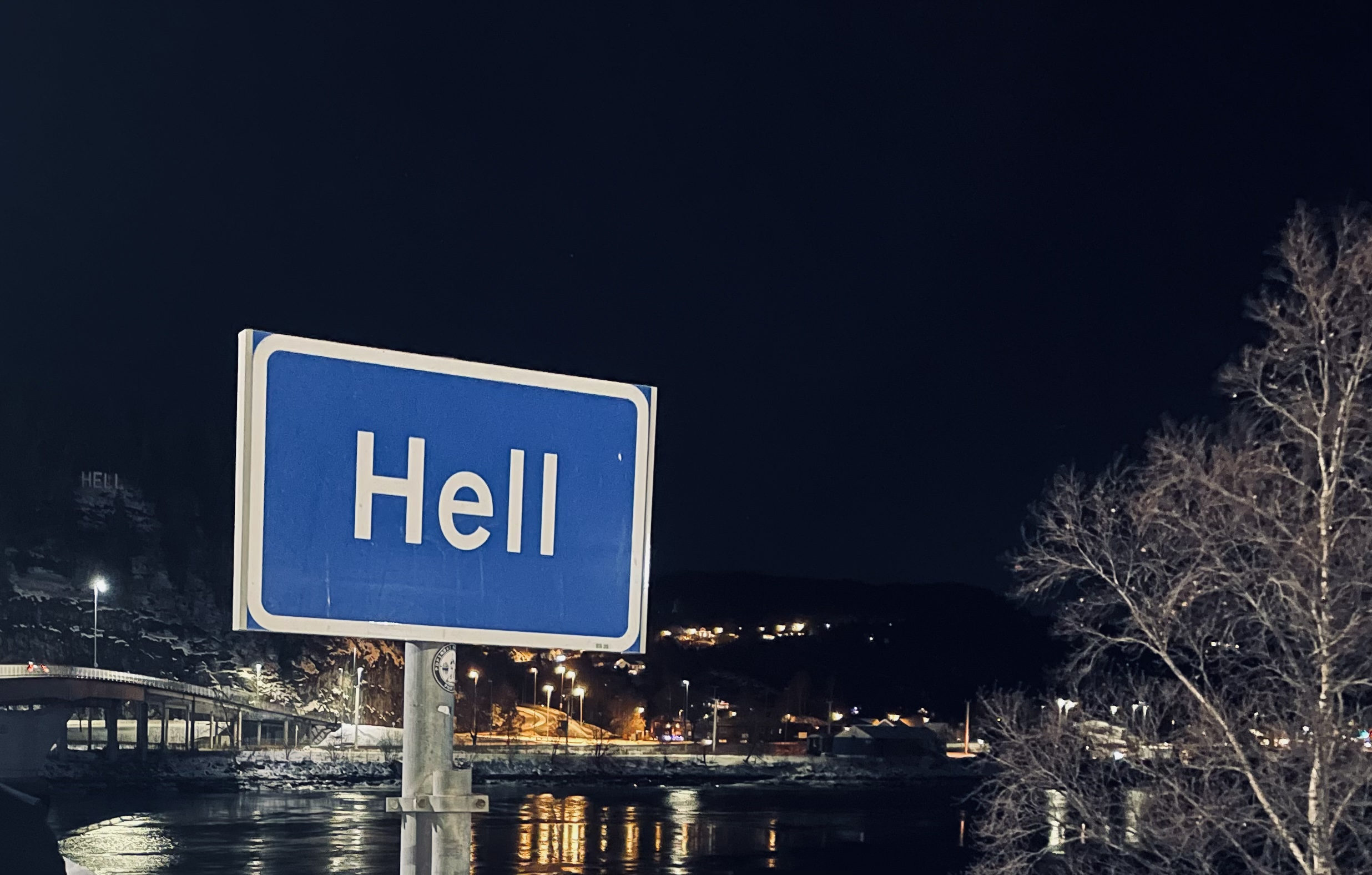
Hell, Norway. In the left corner of the background are hillside letters stating "HELL".

Place names considered unusual can include those which are also offensive words, inadvertently humorous (especially if mispronounced) or highly charged words, as well as place names of unorthodox spelling and pronunciation, including especially short or long names. These names often have an unintended effect or double-meaning when read by someone who speaks another language.

== Profane, humorous and highly charged words ==
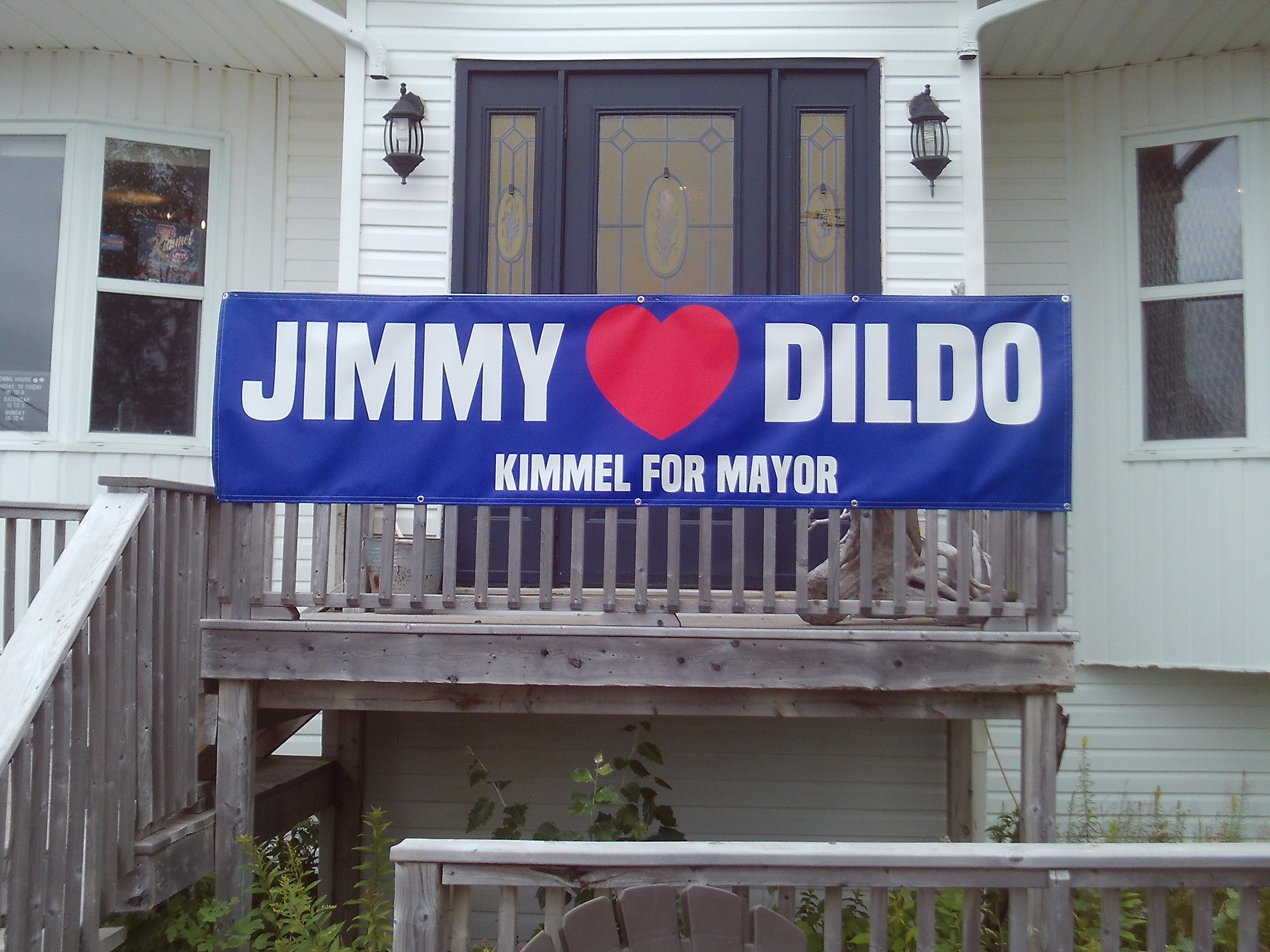
In 2019, American comedian Jimmy Kimmel launched a satirical candidacy for Mayor of Dildo, Newfoundland and Labrador, Canada.

Some place names can be offensive or humorous in other languages, like Rottenegg or Fucking (renamed to Fugging in 2021) in Austria, or Fjuckby in Sweden, where the name can be associated with the word "fuck". Although as a place name Fucking is benign in German, in English the word is usually vulgar. Its earliest recorded use in England is within a 14th-century Bristol field name, Fucking Grove, although it is unclear whether the word was considered obscene at that time. Similarly, when they hear of the French town of Condom, English speakers will likely associate it with condoms.

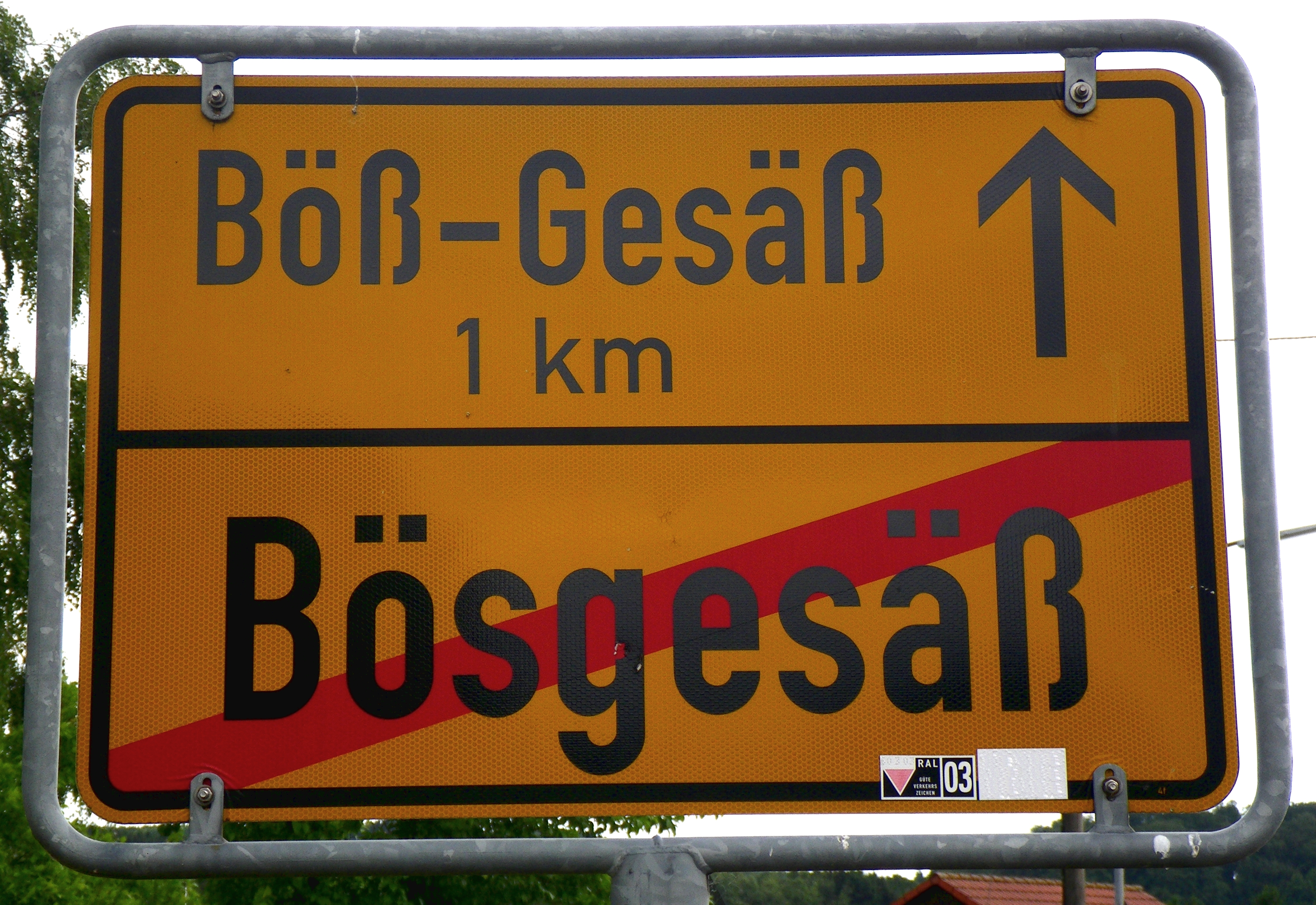
Exit sign of Bösgesäß ("Bad-Ass") with the reference to Böß-Gesäß ("Hessian-Bösgesäß") one kilometer (1,100 yards) away. The two districts are only about 150 meters (160 yards) apart.

Conversely, a number of place names can, by folk etymology or otherwise, be considered humorous or offensive by their inhabitants, such as the Italian towns of Bastardo ("Bastard") and Troia ("Slut", literally a female pig; the same name is used in Italian for the ancient city of Troy), the German towns Affendorf ("Monkey Village"), Bösgesäß ("Bad-Ass" or "Evil-Buttock"), Faulebutter ("Rancid Butter"), Fickmühlen ("Fuck Mills"), Himmelreich ("Kingdom of Heaven"), which appropriately lies at the edge of the Höllental ("Hell's Valley"), Katzenhirn ("Cat Brain", nearest to Mindelheim), Lederhose (Lederhosen, leather trousers), Neger ("Negro"), Plöd (blöd means "stupid", renamed in 2009), Regenmantel ("Raincoat"), and Warzen ("Warts"). Petting is a village in Bavaria homonymous to petting both in German and English. The Austrian municipality Unterstinkenbrunn and the cadastral community Oberstinkenbrunn ("Lower Stinking Well" and "Upper Stinking Well", respectively) can also be considered offensive by residents.

In Sweden, there are the villages of Porrarp (in which "porr" translates to "porn"), Mensträsk ("menstruation"), Fittja ("Fitta" translates to "cunt"), and Rövhålet ("Asshole").

In the Czech Republic, there are villages called Šukačka ("Fucking") and Onen Svět ("The Other World"), which are located 2 kilometres (1¼ miles) from each other.

In Canada, there is a lake named Big Ass Lake in Nova Scotia, and the town of Saint-Louis-du-Ha! Ha! in Quebec.

In Hong Kong, place names containing the words "si2" (屎, shit) and "niu6" (尿, piss) are common, and there are a number of place names actually containing profanities, such as Gau Tau (㞗頭, lit. 'penis head'; since renamed to Shek Ngau Chau (石牛洲), Ham Lun Kok (含撚角, lit. 'blowjob corner'), first renamed by swapping out the profane character 'penis' (撚) to the homophonic 'discussion' (倫), then further changed entirely to Yau Lung Kok (游龍角, lit. 'snaking dragon corner') respectively. Other examples include Kau Shi Wai (狗屎圍, lit. 'dog shit grounds'), now Fung Mei Wai (鳳美圍, lit. 'phoenix beauty grounds').

In the United States, there are at least three towns named Cumming, a slang term for ejaculation (Cummington, Massachusetts, Cumming, Iowa, and Cumming, Georgia), and the name of the town of Effingham, Illinois, (Note: And the village of Effingham, Surrey, England, which shares its name with a railway junction, a hundred (ancient administrative district), and the famous admiral Lord Howard of Effingham) contains a minced oath for "fuck". Long Dick Creek in Iowa is named after a settler, not male genitalia, and Horneytown, North Carolina is named for the Horney family of early settlers. There is also Two Egg, Florida, the name of which evokes testicles, and Athol, Massachusetts, whose pronunciation evokes "asshole". In South Carolina, there is a town named Fingerville, after a settler, Joseph Finger. In Michigan, there is a town named Hell, and various explanations for its name exist. The small town of Hooker, Oklahoma is named after the town's founder John "Hooker" Threlkeld.

In the United Kingdom, there are a number of places with names that would be considered derogatory in other settings – such as the Northamptonshire community Titty Ho; a pair of Twatts, one in Orkney and the other in Shetland; the Dorset community, Shitterton, and the Essex village of Fingringhoe. The village of Ham and the town of Sandwich in Kent are close to each other. When people hear of the Turkish city of Batman, English speakers will likely associate it with the superhero of the same name.

== Name changes ==
=== For negative reasons ===
Some place names are deemed to be offensive or unacceptable, often through historic semantic changes in what is tolerated.

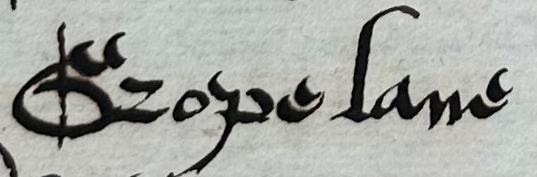
Grope Lane in Bristol, as recorded in a 1542 rent roll

An example of this would be the once common English street name Gropecunt Lane, whose etymology is a historical use of the street by prostitutes to ply their trade. During the Middle Ages, the word cunt may often have been considered merely vulgar, having been in common use in its anatomical sense since at least the 13th century. Its steady disappearance from the English vernacular may have been the result of a gradual cleaning-up of the name; Gropecunt Lane in 13th-century Wells became Grope Lane, and then in the 19th century, Grove Lane. In the city of York, Grapcunt Lane (grāp being the Old English word for "grope") was renamed Grope Lane and is now called Grape Lane. In Bristol, Gropecount Lane was sometimes being contracted to Grope Lane by the late 15th century. This was later euphemised to Grape Lane, or in the 18th century Hallier's Lane. However, the old name was only finally obliterated by the City Council's decision to rename the street Nelson Street, following the death of Admiral Lord Nelson at the Battle of Trafalgar.

The Swedish village of Kräkånger, whose name could be interpreted as "vomit regret", changed its name to Lövsele in 1951.

A similar case was in the town of Sasmuan, Pampanga, in the Philippines, formerly known as "Sexmoán" based on attempts by Spanish friars to transcribe Sasmuan; it was unanimously changed into Sasmuan in 1991, because of negative sexual connotations associated with the place name.

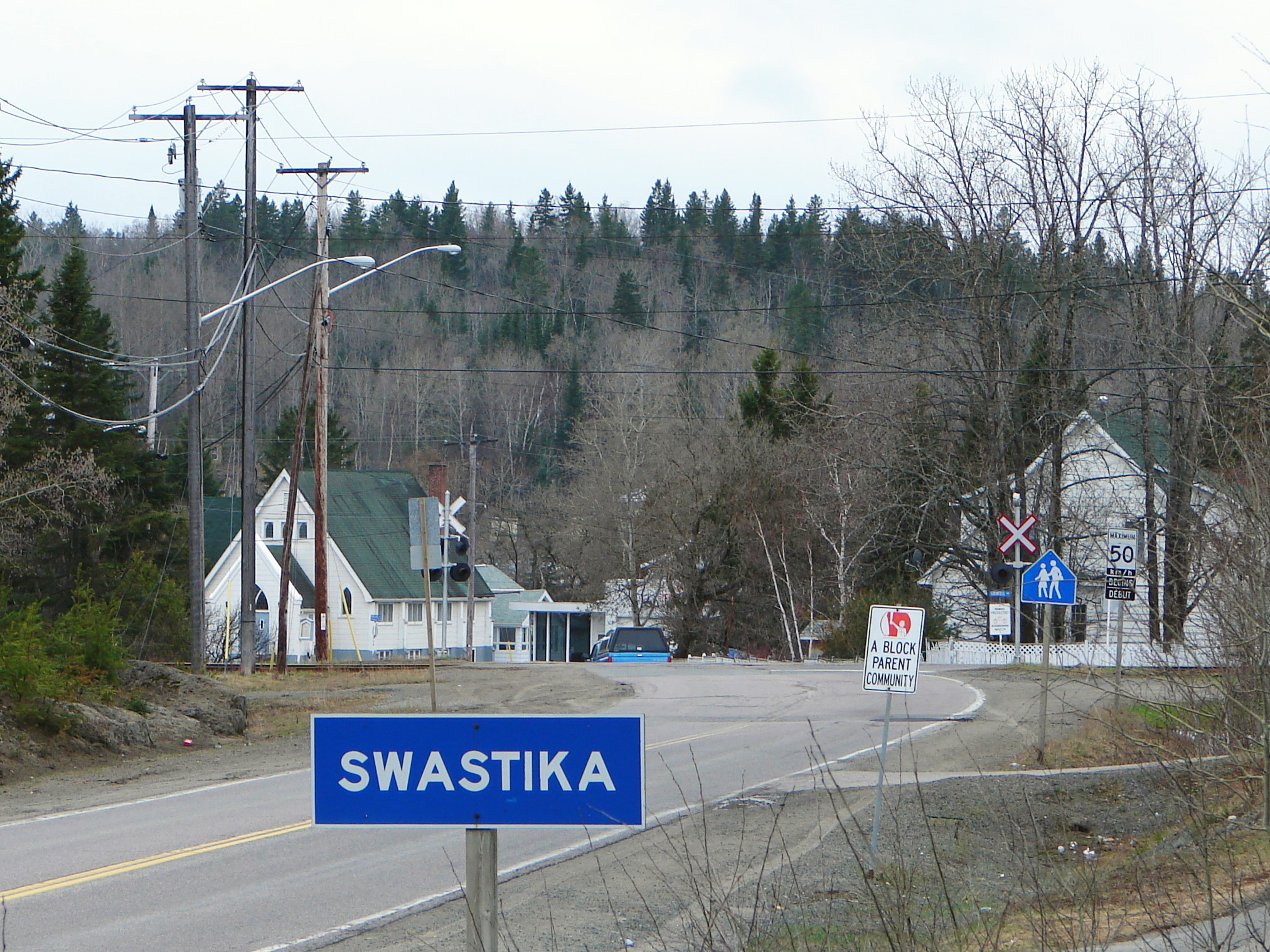
Swastika, Ontario

In Canada, the town of Swastika, Ontario, founded in 1908, adopted its name years before the Nazi Party adopted the swastika as a symbol, and, in fact, over a decade before the Nazi Party was formed in early 1920. During World War II, the provincial government removed the Swastika sign and replaced it with a sign renaming the town "Winston". The residents removed the Winston sign and replaced it with a Swastika sign with the message, "To hell with Hitler, we came up with our name first."

In Spain, a municipality was named Castrillo Matajudíos ("Jew-killer Camp") from 1627 to 2015. Matamoros (Moor killer), however, remains a common place name, surname, and even the name of several businesses in Spanish-speaking countries.

A few place names in the United States and Canada historically used the word "nigger", a derogatory term for black people. Over the course of the 20th century, many of these place names were changed because of the racist connotations of the word. One example is Dead Nigger Draw in Texas (named to commemorate the Buffalo Soldier tragedy of 1877), which was changed to Dead Negro Draw in 1963, then to Buffalo Soldier Draw in 2020. Another is Niggerhead Mountain near Malibu, California, which was changed to Negrohead Mountain in the 1960s and finally to Ballard Mountain in 2010 for an early African American settler. Niggertown Marsh and Niggertown Knoll in Highlands County, Florida, named for a short-lived freedmen's settlement from the 1870s, were removed from public maps following a complaint in 1992.

In Canada, Quebec decided in 2015 to rename 11 places within the province that contained the word "nigger" or the French equivalent, nègre. An Australian island about 30 kilometres (19 mi) north of Cape Grenville was formerly known as Nigger Head; in September 2017, the Queensland government stated that a new name would be chosen for the island, although a new name was never selected and the island remains officially unnamed. In 2016, New Zealand renamed three locations which were found to be offensive: Niggerhead, Nigger Hill, and Nigger Stream became Tawhai Hill, Kanuka Hills, and Pukio Stream respectively.

Numerous place names in the United States and Canada have historically included the term "squaw", a word considered racist and sexist toward Indigenous women. While originating from Algonquian languages, (like the Cree word iskwēw meaning "woman") Indigenous peoples in America and Canada consider the term offensive due to its centuries-long use in a derogatory context. Notable name changes include those of the 2003 of Squaw Peak in Phoenix, Arizona, renamed to Piestewa Peak, after Specialist Lori Piestewa, a Hopi soldier killed in action during the United States invasion of Iraq. In 2022, Squaw Valley, California, site of the 1960 Winter Olympics, was renamed Olympic Valley. Squaw Island, a small Island at the north end of Canandaigua Lake, was renamed in 2021 to Skenoh Island. The most comprehensive change came in 2021, when Secretarial Order 3404 directed the U.S. Board on Geographic Names to replace all place names containing the word "squaw''. The renaming process invited public suggestions before finalizing over 650 changes, all documented in an official government database.

Kindai University in Osaka, Japan, changed its English-language name in 2014 from Kinki University (pronounced kinky which in English has a provocative meaning). The Japanese-language name of the university, Kinki daigaku (近畿大学), was left unchanged. The change was globally reported, though since its founding in 1949, the original name was not a problem within Japan. However, with the dramatic globalization of Japanese universities in recent decades, including the presence of hundreds of foreign students, staff, faculty, and visiting scholars on campus, the leadership of the university made the change in 2016, after deciding to do so in 2014.

Beijing's Zhushikou (珠市口) was originally known as "Zhushikou" (猪市口) during the Ming dynasty, In which "zhu" (猪) meant "pig", and "shi" (市) meant "market", because it was a famous market for selling live pigs. By the Qing dynasty, the pig market had faded away. The place was renamed to "Zhushikou" (珠市口), substituting 猪 for 珠, which are homophones in Standard Chinese.

In 1997, the town of Gay Head in Massachusetts changed its name to Aquinnah.

=== For positive reasons ===
Sometimes, place names are changed as a publicity stunt or to promote tourism.

Waters, Arkansas, changed its name to Pine Ridge, Arkansas, after it became known that the fictional town Pine Ridge in the radio sitcom Lum and Abner was based on Waters. Now a sparsely populated and no longer incorporated community, Pine Ridge is home to a Lum and Abner museum.

Truth or Consequences, New Mexico, changed its name from Hot Springs in 1950, after the host of the radio program Truth or Consequences promised free publicity to any town willing to change its name to that of the show. Jim Thorpe, Pennsylvania, changed its name from Mauch Chunk in honor of the famous athlete when his widow agreed to allow his remains to be buried there.

The former community of Clark, Denton County, Texas, changed its name to DISH as part of a marketing agreement with Dish Network whereby the town's residents (roughly 200) would get free satellite TV service from the company.

In 1999, the town of Halfway, Oregon, changed its name to Half.com for one year after the e-commerce start-up of the same name offered 20 computers, as well as $110,000 for the school, and other financial subsidies.

St. Augusta, Minnesota, was for a short time named Ventura after the then-governor Jesse Ventura (whose ring name was in turn named after the city of Ventura, California) to draw attention in avoiding annexation by the nearby city of St. Cloud. The name was reverted to the original name after the crisis passed.

In November 1998, the town of Granville, North Dakota, agreed to change its name temporarily to McGillicuddy City as part of a promotion for Dr. McGillicuddy's schnapps.

In August 1998, Topeka, Kansas was renamed ToPikachu for the North American launch of Nintendo's wildly successful Pokémon franchise. The city was once again renamed ToPikachu for one day, October 27, 2018, for the launch of Pokémon: Let's Go, Pikachu! and Let's Go, Eevee!

In March 2010, Topeka temporarily changed its name to Google, after the technology company, to secure the installation of Google Fiber in the city.

== Lexically unusual place names ==
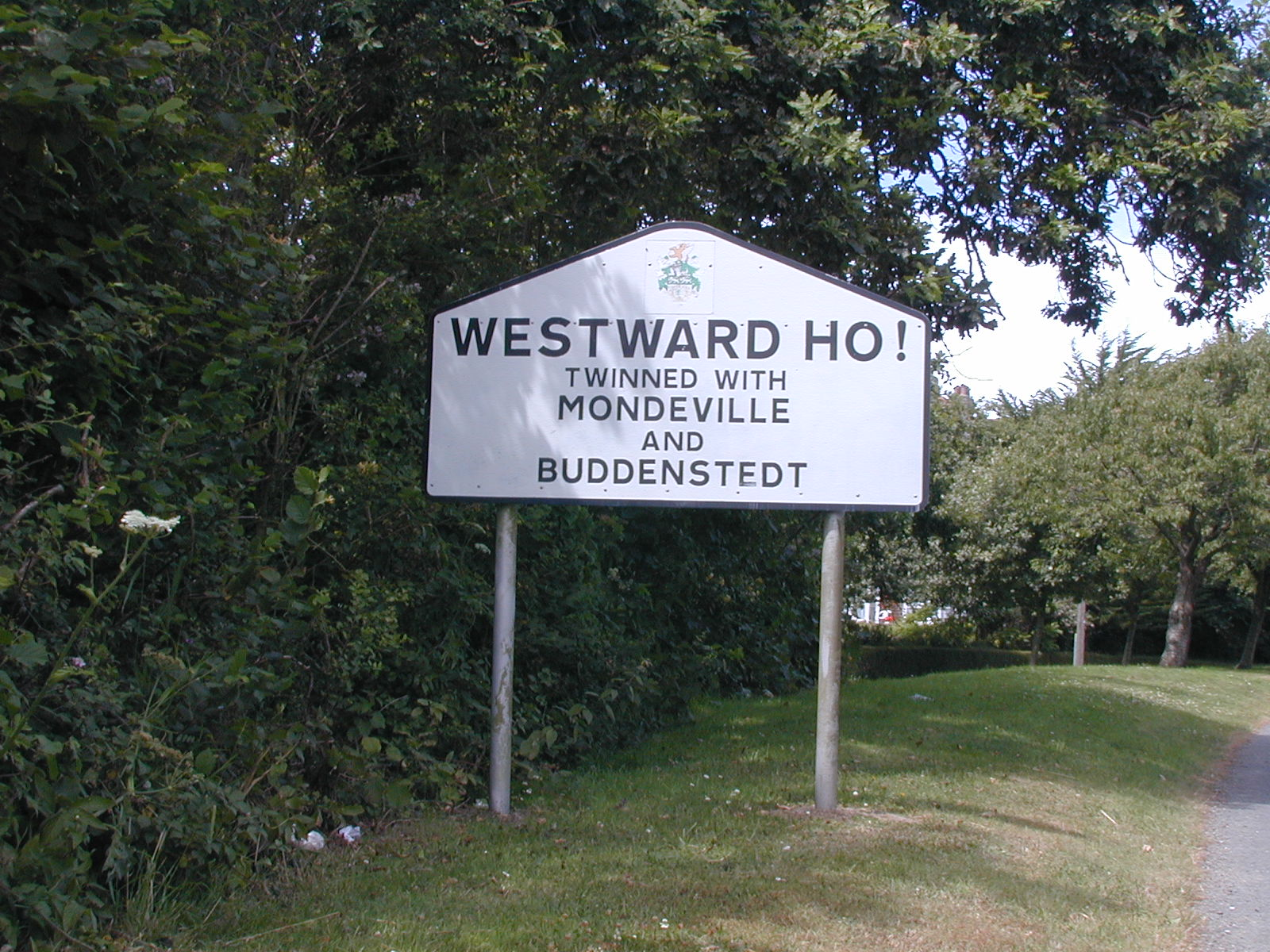
Westward Ho!, Devon, England, is the only place name in the British Isles with an exclamation mark.

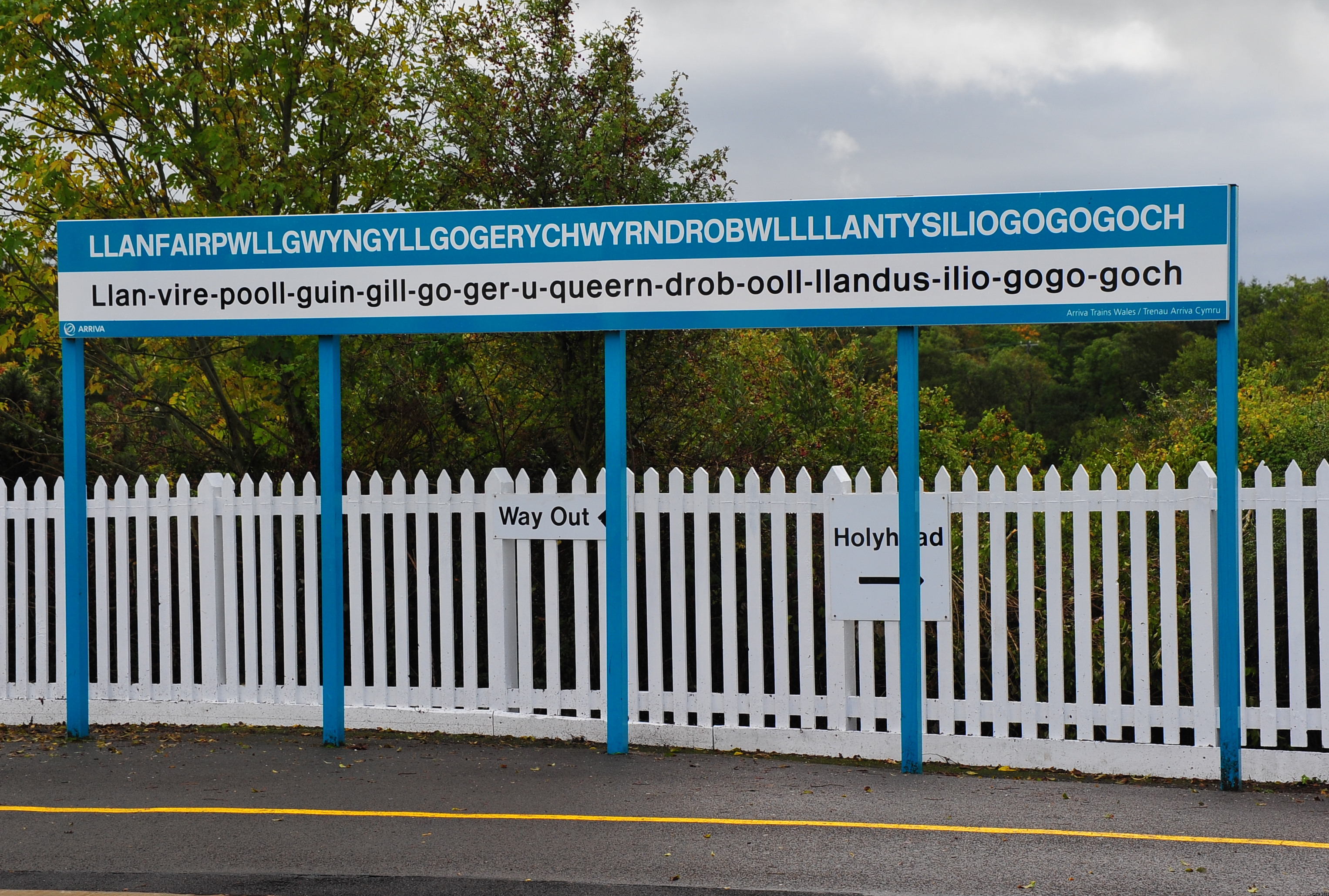
The railway station sign in the village of Llanfairpwllgwyngyllgogerychwyrndrobwllllantysiliogogogoch, Wales, gives an approximation of the correct pronunciation for English speakers.

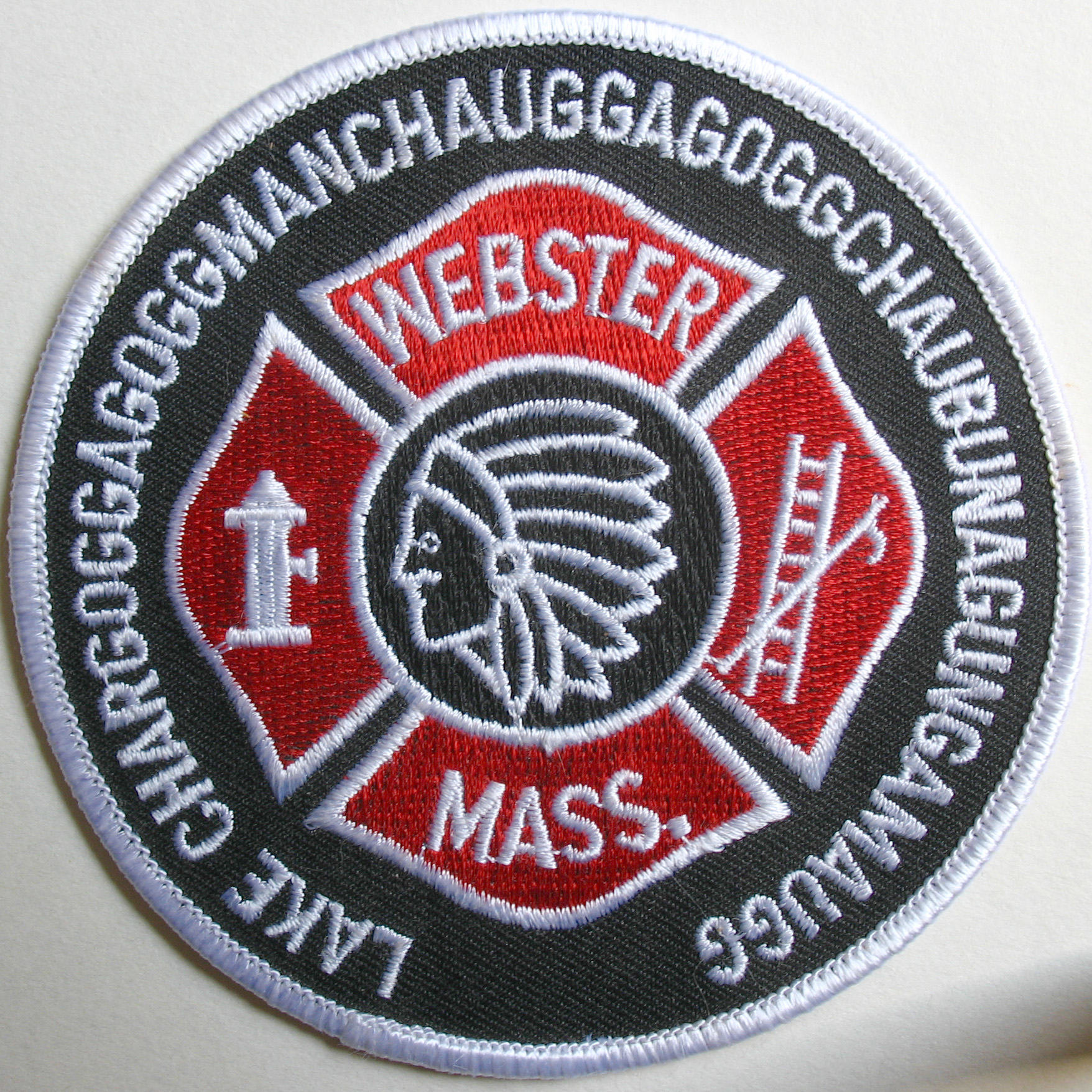
Webster, Massachusetts, firefighter's patch with the longest version of Webster Lake's name on its circumference

Unorthodox spelling or pronunciation, particularly short or long names, and names derived from uncommon sources, are often seen as unusual, especially by people outside the culture which named them. The Welsh village of Llanfairpwllgwyngyll changed its name to the longer Llanfairpwllgwyngyllgogerychwyrndrobwllllantysiliogogogoch ("The church of [St.] Mary (Llanfair) [of the] pool (pwll) of the white hazels (gwyn gyll) near [lit. "over against"] (go ger) the fierce whirlpool (y chwyrn drobwll) [and] the church of [St.] Tysilio (Llantysilio) of the red cave") in the 1860s for publicity reasons. At 58 letters, it has the longest place name in the UK.

The body of fresh water in Webster, Massachusetts, that has historically (since at least 1921) borne the apparently Native American 45-letter/fourteen-syllable name Lake Chargoggagoggmanchauggagoggchaubunagungamaugg is usually shortened, for instance on road maps, to using only the final six syllables from its "long form"; as Lake Chaubunagungamaug, or even more simply to "Webster Lake". The longest single-word place name in the world is Taumatawhakatangihangakoauauotamateaturipukakapikimaungahoronukupokaiwhenuakitanatahu, a hill in New Zealand.

Conversely, several place names consist of only one letter. Multiple Norwegian towns are named Å. The name often comes from the Old Norse word Ár, meaning small river. Examples include: Å, Åfjord; Å, Meldal; Å, Lavangen; and Å, Tranøy (also compare rivers named Aa). A village in northern France has been called Y since the 13th century. The Netherlands has IJ (Amsterdam), formerly spelled Y. The Dutch digraph IJ, although typed using two characters, is sometimes considered a ligature, or even a single letter in itself.

There are a number of place names that seem unusual to English speakers because they do not conform to standard English orthography rules. Examples are the Welsh villages of Ysbyty Ystwyth and Bwlchgwyn, which appear to English speakers to contain no vowel characters, although y and w represent vowel sounds in Welsh; Pychgynmygytgyn, a lake in Russia, which also has no English vowels on its name; Aioi, Japan; Eiao, Marquesas Islands; Aiea, Hawaii; (Note: Aiea has an initial glottal stop in Hawaiian, which was dropped in English orthography.) Oia, Greece; Oia, Spain; Aia and Ea, Spanish Basque Country; Ae, Scotland; Aa and Ao in Estonia; Eu, France and Ii, Finland, on the other hand, contain only vowels and no consonants. Triples of any letter in English are considered rare; although the French Polynesian commune Faʻaʻā and its airport Faa'a International Airport both appear to contain a triple a; the apostrophe-like ʻetas represent glottal stops in Tahitian. Another example is the small community of Kaʻaʻawa on the island of Oʻahu, Hawaiʻi; similar to the related language Tahitian, the apostrophe-like ʻokina letter in Hawaiian represents a glottal stop, but sometimes the name is written (incorrectly, but conforming more to English-language usage) without these letters as Kaaawa.

Some place names include unusual punctuation such as exclamation points. Examples in Canada include the municipality of Saint-Louis-du-Ha! Ha! as well as names containing Baie des Ha! Ha!. In the United States, the city of Hamilton!, Ohio briefly added an exclamation point to its name in 1986. Italy has a wine region known as Est! Est!! Est!!! di Montefiascone.

Unusual names may also be created as a result of error by the naming authority. An example is Rednaxela Terrace in Hong Kong, which is believed to be the name Alexander but erroneously written right-to-left (the normal practice for writing Chinese in the past); the name has stayed and even been transcribed back to Chinese phonetically.

== Road sign theft ==
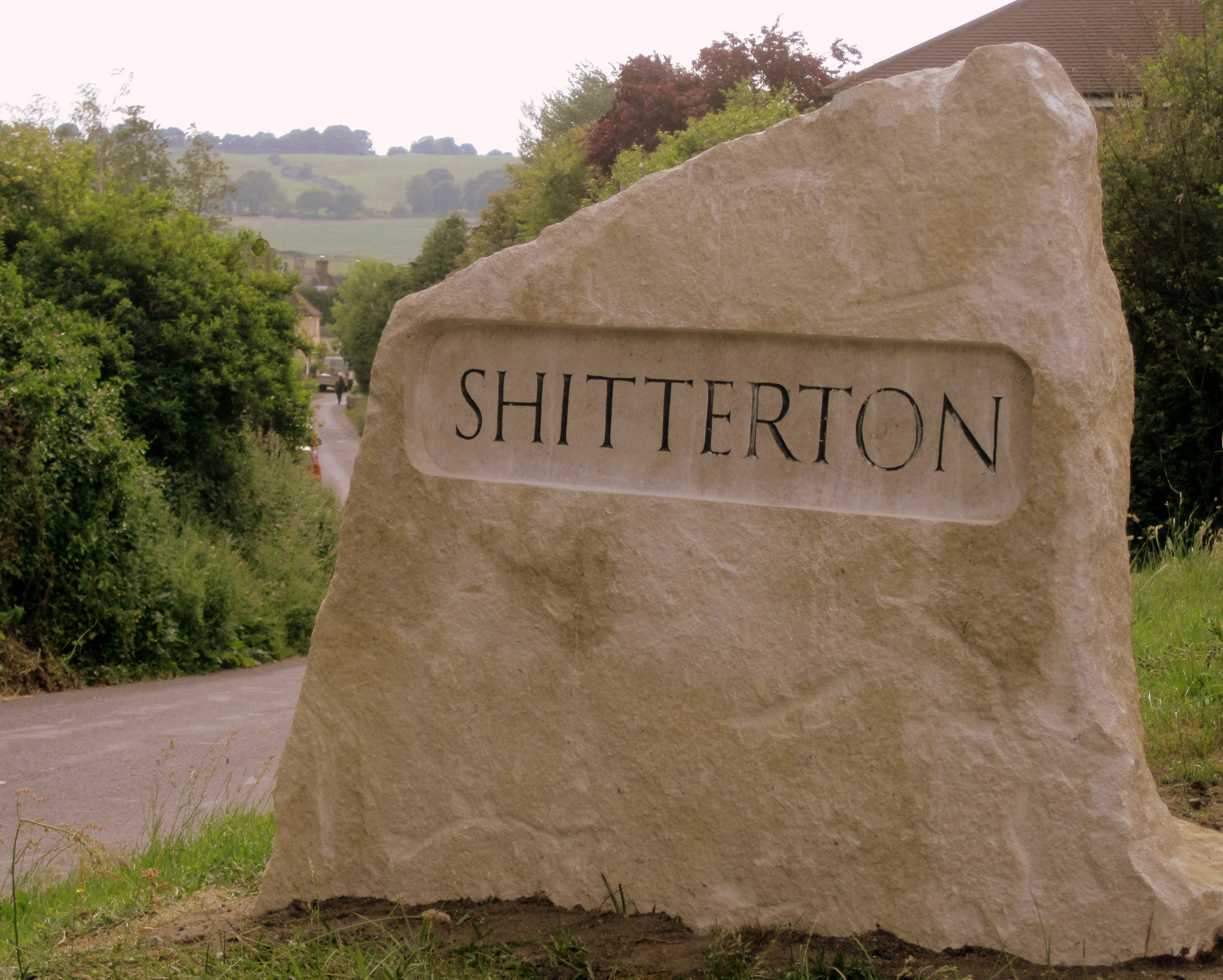
Large stone road sign, installed to deter theft, in Shitterton, Dorset, England.

As a result of increased notoriety, road signs were commonly stolen in Fucking, Austria, as souvenirs – the only crime which had been reported in the village. It cost some 300 euros to replace each stolen sign, and the costs were reflected in the taxes that local residents paid. In 2004, owing mainly to the stolen signs, a vote was held on changing the village's name, but the residents voted against doing so. Tarsdorf municipality's mayor Siegfried Höppl stated that it was decided to keep the name as it had existed for 800 years, and further stated that "everyone here knows what it means in English, but for us Fucking is Fucking – and it's going to stay Fucking." In November 2020, the council of Tarsdorf voted to have the village's name officially changed to Fugging (pronounced the same as Fucking in the dialect spoken in the region), effective 1 January 2021.

In 2010, the inhabitants of Shitterton, Dorset, purchased a 1.5-ton block of Purbeck stone to place at the entrance to Shitterton, carved with the hamlet's name, to prevent theft. A truck and crane were hired by volunteers to put the stone in place at a total cost of £680.

== See also ==
- List of places with numeric names
- Gag name
- List of chemical compounds with unusual names
- List of long place names
- List of short place names
- Toponymy, the study of place names
- Wikipedia:Unusual place names, a larger list of unusual place names
