= Coon Butt =

Summit in Blount County, Tennessee, US

Coordinates: 35.584333°N 83.870985°W

Coon Butt is a summit in Blount County, Tennessee, in the United States. It is located within the Great Smoky Mountains National Park. With an elevation of 2,326 feet (709 m), Coon Butt is the 422nd highest mountain of Tennessee.

Coon Butt has been noted for its unusual place name.
