= Risteárd de Tiúit =

Risteárd de Tiúit (anglicised as Richard Tuite) (ob. 1210) was an Anglo-Norman nobleman and a member of Richard de Clare, 2nd Earl of Pembroke's Irish invasion force, and Lord Chief Justice of Ireland. His part in the original invasion is acknowledged in The Song of Dermot and the Earl, which recorded his grant of land in the western part of Meath (present-day Westmeath and Longford) under the authority of Hugh de Lacy in Trim.

== Introduction ==
He built one of the largest Motte and Bailey settlements in Ireland at Granard Motte in 1199. His death, while Lord Chief Justice of Ireland, is recorded in Athlone by the Annals of the Four Masters under the year 1210 and his remains lie today in Abbeylara's Cistercian abbey. He was granted the feudal barony of Moyashel.

== Descendants ==
Risteárd de Tiúit had two sons who survived him, Risteárd 'Dubh' de Tiúit, the eldest son and heir to the title and lands, and Muiris. Lodge's Peerage says that it was this Risteárd, Risteárd Dubh, who established the monastery at Granard about 1210 and at this time Risteárd Dubh already held the manors of Kilalton and Demar, and was enfeoffed in that of Kilstir in Meath. Muiris became Lord of Jordanstown and had four sons who survived him, Tomás (Thomas), Piaras, Matthew and Ruairí (Roger). Sir Risteárd de Tiúit held lands at Ballyloughloe in 1342, when he was arrested on suspicion of treason.

De Tiúit is also the ancestor of those who bear the de Tiúit/ Tuite surname. He is variously recorded as Tiúit, Diúit and Tuit. Numerous placenames in Meath (Tuiterath), Cavan (Droim Thiúit/ Drumyouth), Westmeath (Tuitestown in Fore; Tuitestown in Moyashel and Magheradernon, and Ballysallagh Tuite), Kilkenny (Baile an Tiúigh Thoir/ Tuitestown and Baile an Tiúigh Beag/ Tuitestown Little) and elsewhere are named after him and his descendants. The surname may be from the Eure region of Normandy where the root, Tuit (generally spelt Thuit as a single or first element), indicates a clearing in a wooded area and represents the local development of the Old Norse word thveit (also written þveit), but sometimes from Old Danish thwēt, brought by the Scandinavians when they settled in Normandy and is similar to English Thwaite also from Old Norse or Old Danish.

== See also ==
- Hiberno-Norman
- Norman Ireland
- Lord Chief Justice of Ireland
