= Twat (disambiguation) =

Twat is a slang word for the human vulva, also used as a derogatory epithet for a foolish person.

Twat or Tuat may also refer to:

- "Twats" (The Armando Iannucci Shows), television episode
- Traveling-wave amplifier tube, in electronics
- Tuat, a people in the north of Algeria
  - Tuat language
- Tokyo University of Agriculture and Technology
- Task Unit Anti Terrorism of 1st Carabinieri Paratroopers Regiment "Tuscania"

== See also ==
- Duat, the underworld in Egyptian mythology
- Taweret, the Egyptian goddess of childbirth and fertility
- Twatt (disambiguation)
