= Negro Foot, Virginia =

Unincorporated community in Virginia, United States

- Unincorporated community
- Location within Virginia Location within the United States
- Coordinates: 37°49′36″N 77°35′52″W
- Country: United States
- State: Virginia
- County: Hanover
- Elevation: 295 ft (90 m)
- Time zone: UTC-5 (Eastern (EST))
  - Summer (DST): UTC-4 (EDT)
- GNIS feature ID: 1471367

Negro Foot is an unincorporated community in Hanover County, Virginia, United States. The community's unusual name has attracted the attention of media commentators.

== Etymology ==
The origin of the name is obscure. Some say the community was named from an incident when a slave's foot was amputated to prevent another escape, while others believe an act of cannibalism caused the name to be selected. The name "Nigger Foot" appears in older publications. A variant name is "Negro".
