= Twat =

English-language profanity

Twat (/twæt/ or /twɑːt/) is an English-language vulgarism which means the vulva or vagina, and is used figuratively as a derogatory epithet. In British English and Irish English it is a common insult referring to an obnoxious or stupid person regardless of gender; in American English, it is rarer and usually used to insult a woman. In Britain and Ireland, the usual pronunciation rhymes with hat, while Americans most often use the older pronunciation that rhymes with squat. This is reflected in the former variant spelling of twot.

The literal sense is first attested in 1656, the epithet in the 1930s. The word's etymology is uncertain. The American Heritage Dictionary suggests a conjectural Old English word thwāt, meaning 'a cut', cognate with the Old Norse þveit (thveit). Jonathon Green suggests a connection with twitchel, a dialect term for a narrow passage. The 20th-century British slang verb twat, meaning 'to hit, whack', is probably an unrelated homonym of onomatopoeic origin.

== Historical use ==
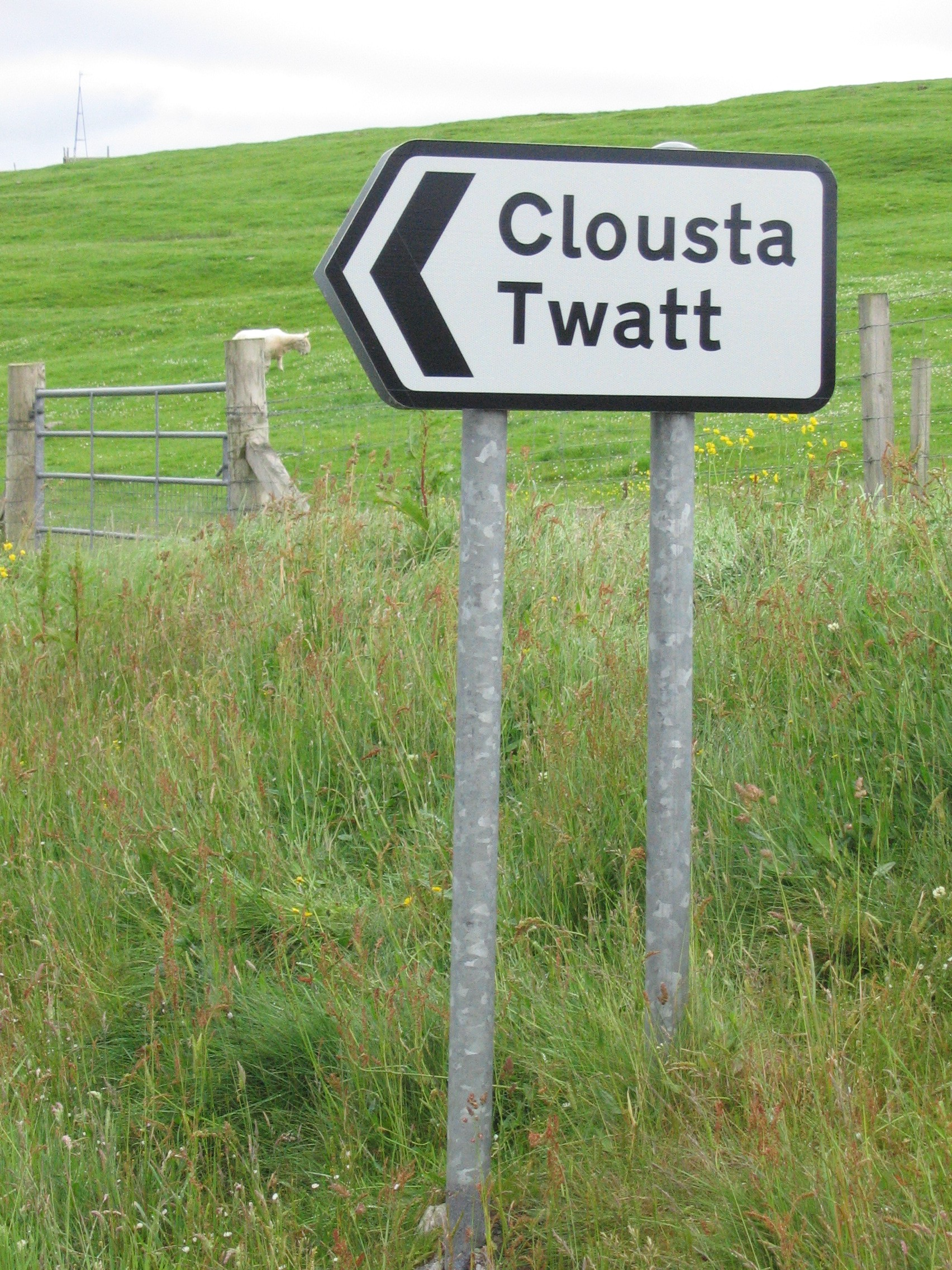
Road sign pointing to Twatt, Shetland, which was ranked No. 4 of the most vulgar-sounding names in Rude Britain, alongside Twatt, Orkney, also in Scotland

Robert Browning famously misused the term in his 1841 poem "Pippa Passes":

Then owls and bats
Cowls and twats
Monks and nuns in a cloister's moods
Adjourn to the oak-stump pantry

Many years later, Frederick J. Furnivall wrote to ask Browning what he meant by twat; Browning replied that as a youth he had encountered the word in a volume of broadsides and inferred it to be an item of nun's clothing akin to a wimple. The relevant lines are from Vanity of Vanities, a 1660 attack on Henry Vane the Younger which includes an anti-Catholic joke:

They talk't of his having a Cardinalls Hat
They'd send him as soon an Old Nuns Twat

Melissa Mohr suggests few Victorians knew the word, given that "none of the twenty-three or so Victorian editions" of Browning's poem omit it. An 1868 query to Notes and Queries asked what the word in the poem meant; the only published reply was, "Twat is good Somersetshire dialect for a toad=twoad=twat". A footnote in William James Rolfe and Heloise Hersey's 1886 Select Poems of Robert Browning summarised his reply to Furnivall with the additional comment, "Twat is in no dictionary"; H. W. Fay noted in 1888 in The Academy that the word was in fact in Thomas Wright's 1857 Dictionary of Obsolete and Provincial English, and said Browning, Furnivall and Rolfe had all made a "distressing blunder". The 1894 reprint of Select Poems replaced the comment with "Browning would not have used the word if he had known its meaning". In 1911 Basil Lanneau Gildersleeve alluded to "a notorious word which smirches the skirt of Pippa Passes".

Browning's error posed a dilemma for many pre-1960s lexicographers, who excluded words deemed obscene but aspired to include all words used by major writers like Browning. The 1890 Century Dictionary included the correct definition, labelled "vulgar", and noted Browning's "supposition" of its meaning. In 1934 Webster's Second New International Dictionary's entry for twat read: "Some part of a nun's garb. Erron. Browning". The Oxford English Dictionary (OED) included many taboo words, albeit often with circumscribed definition and quotations, and twat was duly included in the relevant OED fascicle, published in 1916. The entry labelled it "low" and obsolete and noted Browning's "erroneous" use. There was no direct definition, but rather "See quot. 1727", a reference to the latest of the entry's five historical citations, namely the definition in the 1727 Universal Etymological English Dictionary, which was in Neo-Latin: pudendum muliebre ("female private part"). Two of the other OED citations included quotes: Vanity of Vanities and a c. 1704 bawdy verse with a variant spelling: "At last, as groping thro' a dang'rous Street, / Where Stones and Twaits in frosty Winters meet". The two unquoted citations were a 1656 translation of Martial's Epigrams and a 1719 bawdy song by Thomas d'Urfey. In 1986 the Supplement to the OED deleted the "obsolete" label and added twentieth-century quotations and the figurative insult as a second sense.

Besides Thomas Wright's 1857 dialect dictionary ("twat pudendum f.") the word also appears in Joseph Wright's 1892 Grammar of the Dialect of Windhill ("twot pudendum fem.") but not in the latter's 1905 English Dialect Dictionary. The 1950s Survey of English Dialects recorded the word at several sites as the term for a cow's vulva.

Edward Bulwer-Lytton's 1870 science fiction novel The Coming Race, uses it to mean tadpole in an apparent satire on Darwin:

Among the pithy sayings which, according to tradition, the philosopher bequeathed to posterity in rhythmical form and sententious brevity, this is notably recorded: "Humble yourselves, my descendants; the father of your race was a 'twat' (tadpole): exalt yourselves, my descendants, for it was the same Divine Thought which created your father that develops itself in exalting you.

== Modern use ==
In 1979, British punk poet John Cooper Clarke included the poem "Twat" on his album Walking Back to Happiness. It has been described, by Nick Duerden of The Independent, as "memorable".

In August 2008, Random House, the publisher of the children's book My Sister Jodie by Jacqueline Wilson, decided after receiving three complaints to reprint the word twat as twit in future editions of the novel so as not to offend readers or their parents.

In a 2009 breakfast radio interview with Christian O'Connell, British Conservative Party leader and future Prime Minister David Cameron quipped that "the trouble with Twitter, the instantness of it—too many twits might make a twat". O'Connell said Cameron did not realise the word could cause offence until Gabrielle Bertin advised him to issue an apology.

In his 2011 book Filthy English, linguist Peter Silverton asked, "Can you distinguish an utter twat from a complete prick? I think you can. An utter twat knows not what he or she does. A complete prick does."

Workers who go to the office on Tuesdays, Wednesdays, and Thursdays and work remotely from home on Mondays and Fridays have been irreverently called "TWaTs". Although the term predated the COVID-19 lockdowns it has become more prevalent since, as more people partially return to offices.

== Sensitivity ==
For the purposes of film certification, usage of the word is not considered as serious as many other swear words. It is listed by the British Board of Film Classification as an example of "moderate language" for the 12 certificate. However, the film Kes originally released in 1969 and given a 'U' certificate by the then British Board of Film Censors, denoting suitable for children, has in later years been re-certified PG in the United Kingdom, meaning: "All ages admitted, but certain scenes may be unsuitable for young children. Should not disturb children aged 8 years or over", despite more than one instance of the word. The word also appears in writing in an episode of Fawlty Towers (the letters on the sign have been rearranged to say "Flowery Twats"). The episode has a 12 certificate.

It also is not on the list of the seven dirty words by George Carlin in his 1972 monologue "Seven Words You Can Never Say on Television", perhaps because the word is much less common in North America than in Britain, although it was used as a term of insult in Mel Brooks' comedy western Blazing Saddles (1974).

Unlike many other swear words, it is included in Google's auto-complete function.

In 2023 the UK Advertising Standards Authority rejected two complaints about an ad in The Sunday Times for the comedy show "Dawn French is a Huge Twat", commenting, "the use of the word would be understood by readers to be self-deprecating and tongue-in-cheek, and it was not, for example, used in a sexual context".

== See also ==
- Cunt
- Twatt, Orkney
- Twatt, Shetland
