= Twatt =

Twatt may refer to:

- Twatt, Orkney, Scotland
- Twatt, Shetland, Scotland

== See also ==
- Twat (disambiguation)
