= Grand Bourgtheroulde =

- Commune
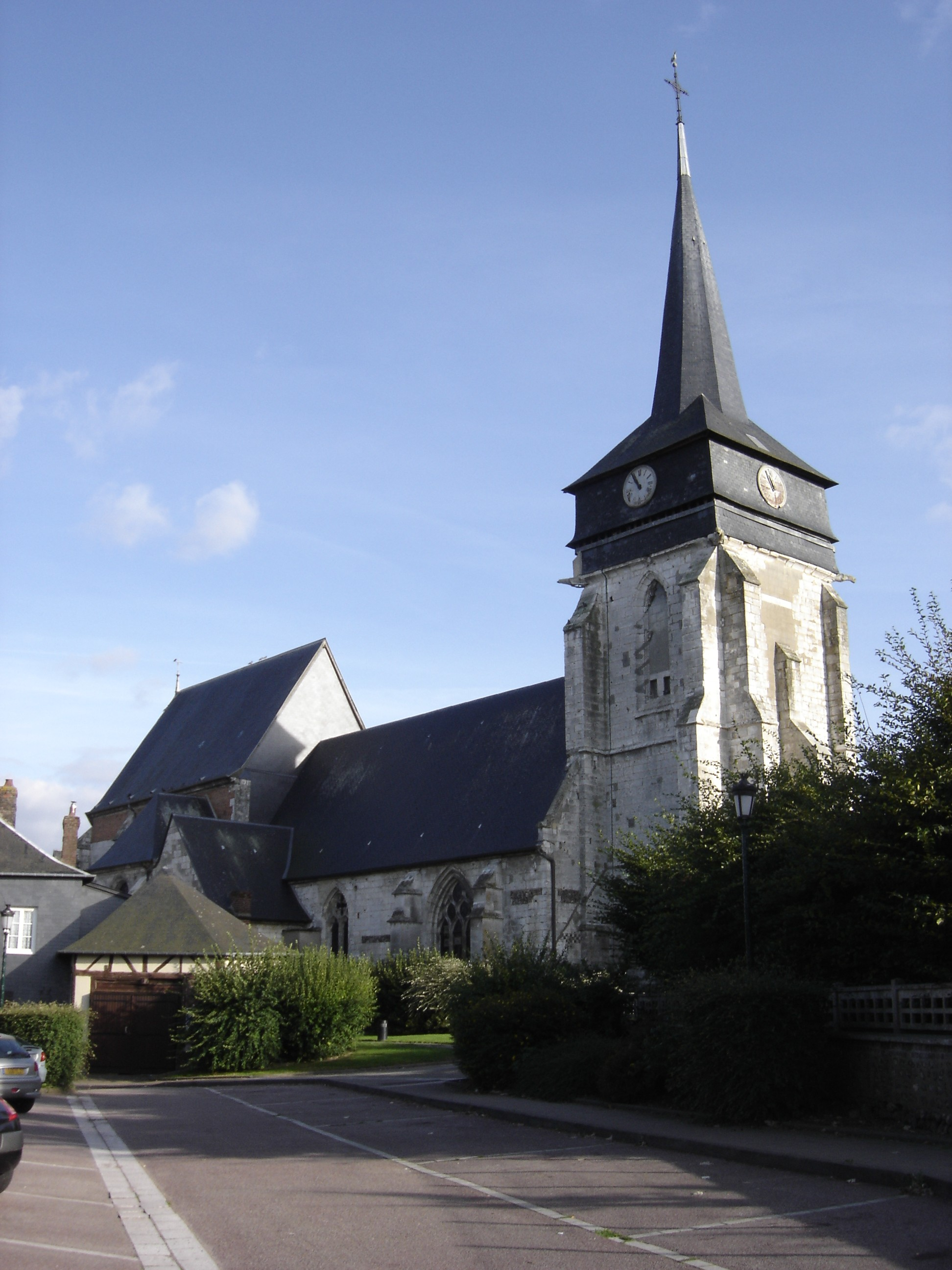
- Church of Saint Laurent
- Location of Grand Bourgtheroulde
- Location within France Location within Normandy
- Coordinates: 49°17′57″N 0°52′28″E
- Country: France
- Region: Normandy
- Department: Eure
- Arrondissement: Bernay
- Canton: Grand Bourgtheroulde

Government
  - Mayor (2023–2026): Christophe Deschamps
- Area^{1}: 19.51 km^{2} (7.53 sq mi)
- Highest elevation: 158 m (518 ft)
- Lowest elevation: 96 m (315 ft)
- Population (2023): 3,995
  - Density: 204.8/km^{2} (530.3/sq mi)
- Time zone: UTC+01:00 (CET)
  - Summer (DST): UTC+02:00 (CEST)
- INSEE/Postal code: 27105 /27520
- ^{1} French Land Register data, which excludes lakes, ponds, glaciers > 1 km^{2} (0.386 sq mi or 247 acres) and river estuaries.

Grand Bourgtheroulde (French pronunciation: [ɡʁɑ̃ buʁtəʁuld]) is a commune in the Eure department in Normandy in northern France. Bourgtheroulde-Infreville is the municipal seat.

== History ==
The Battle of Bourgthéroulde was fought between English loyalists and Norman rebels in 1124. On 1 January 2016, Grand Bourgtheroulde was created by the merger of Bosc-Bénard-Commin, Bourgtheroulde-Infreville and Thuit-Hébert.

== Population ==
Population data refer to the commune in its geography as of January 2025.

Historical population
Year	Pop.	±% p.a.
1968	1,661	—
1975	1,745	+0.71%
1982	2,979	+7.94%
1990	3,265	+1.15%
1999	3,374	+0.37%
2007	3,561	+0.68%
2012	3,523	−0.21%
2017	3,802	+1.54%
2023	3,995	+0.83%
Source: INSEE
