= Niggertown Marsh =

Reconstruction-era former freedmen's settlement in Florida, US

Niggertown Marsh is the former name of a marsh in Highlands County, Florida. It was located next to an elevated area which was formerly known as Niggertown Knoll. Both geographical features were named after a settlement founded and maintained by former slaves during the Reconstruction era following the American Civil War. The two names, which incorporate the racial slur nigger, were removed from Highlands County official maps in 1992 following a complaint from a college administrator.

Niggertown Knoll was located at 27.2980863°N 81.5304404°W. Niggertown Marsh was located immediately to its east.

== Freedmen's settlement ==
The freedmen's settlement was founded circa 1870 by a former slave called Neptune "Nep" Henry (c. 1830 - 1915). The settlers came from what is today Bealsville in eastern Hillsborough County. According to Ches Skipper, the son of one of the area's first white settlers, the residents of the town began to engage in cattle raiding, leading to tension with the region's white cattlemen. Eventually the cattlemen destroyed the town, burning it to the ground according to some accounts. Henry returned to Bealsville, where he died in 1915.

== See also ==
- Place names considered unusual
