= Bourgtheroulde-Infreville =

- Part of Grand-Bourgtheroulde
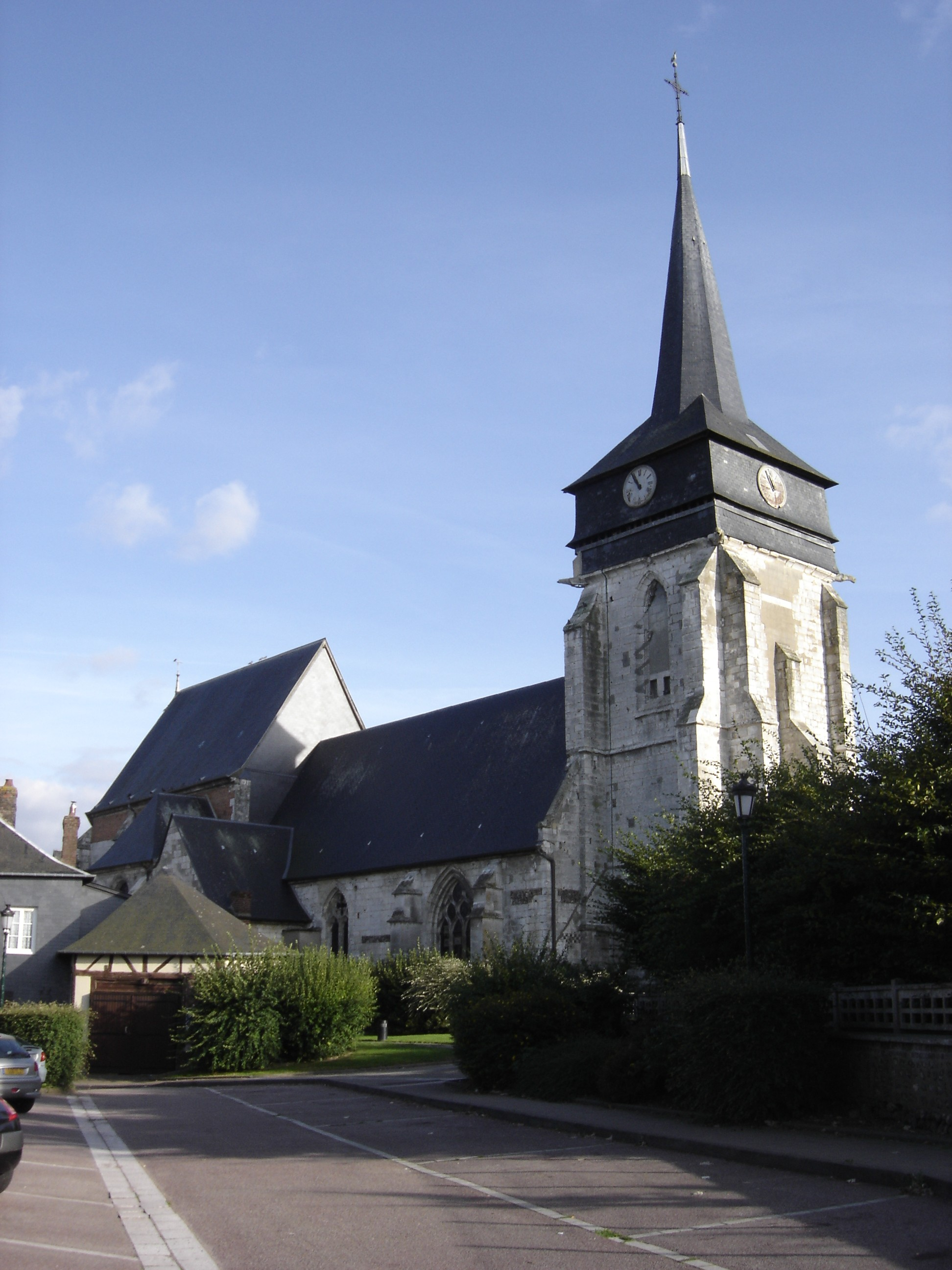
- Church of Saint Laurent

- Coat of arms
- Location of Bourgtheroulde-Infreville
- Location within France Location within Normandy
- Coordinates: 49°17′57″N 0°52′28″E
- Country: France
- Region: Normandy
- Department: Eure
- Arrondissement: Bernay
- Canton: Bourgtheroulde-Infreville
- Commune: Grand-Bourgtheroulde
- Area^{1}: 11.62 km^{2} (4.49 sq mi)
- Highest elevation: 158 m (518 ft)
- Lowest elevation: 96 m (315 ft)
- Population (2017): 3,171
  - Density: 272.9/km^{2} (706.8/sq mi)
- Time zone: UTC+01:00 (CET)
  - Summer (DST): UTC+02:00 (CEST)
- Postal code: 27520
- ^{1} French Land Register data, which excludes lakes, ponds, glaciers > 1 km^{2} (0.386 sq mi or 247 acres) and river estuaries.

Bourgtheroulde-Infreville (French pronunciation: [buʁtəʁuld ɛ̃fʁəvil]) is a former commune in the Eure department in Normandy in northern France. It is the seat of the commune of Grand-Bourgtheroulde.

== History ==
The Battle of Bourgthéroulde was fought between English loyalist and Norman rebels in 1124. In 1964 Bourgtheroulde absorbed the former commune Boscherville. The commune Bourgtheroulde-Infreville was created in 1973 by the merger of the former communes Bourgtheroulde and Infreville. On 1 January 2016, Bosc-Bénard-Commin, Bourgtheroulde-Infreville and Thuit-Hébert merged, becoming one commune called Grand-Bourgtheroulde.

== Population ==
Historical population
Year	Pop.	±% p.a.
1975	1,317	—
1982	2,559	+9.95%
1990	2,742	+0.87%
1999	2,812	+0.28%
2006	2,911	+0.50%
2017	3,171	+0.78%
Source: EHESS and INSEE

== See also ==
- Communes of the Eure department
