= Kiss (Wilson novel) =

2007 novel by Jacqueline Wilson

- Author: Jacqueline Wilson
- Illustrator: Nick Sharratt
- Language: English
- Subject: Homosexuality, Love
- Genre: Romance
- Publisher: Doubleday
- Publication date: 10 November 2007
- Pages: 320 pp (first edition)
- ISBN: 0-385-61010-6
- OCLC: 156890927
- Preceded by: Candyfloss
- Followed by: My Sister Jodie

Kiss is a book for teenage readers, written by Jacqueline Wilson. It was illustrated by Nick Sharratt. It was published 2007 by Doubleday. The book revolves around a girl called Sylvie whose childhood friend Carl (whom she is in love with) is struggling to come to terms with his sexuality.

== Plot summary ==
Sylvie and Carl have been friends since they were little. They have called themselves boyfriend and girlfriend since they were small and Sylvie has always believed they would end up married. As they start high school, Carl drifts further and further away from Sylvie. One day, she wanders into the girls' bathrooms and finds Miranda, the most popular girl in school, there. Miranda asks Sylvie to go to her party after finding out about Sylvie's "boyfriend", whom she has taken a shine to, even though they haven't met. Sylvie accepts and then asks Carl about it, hoping that he will not go. To her dismay, Carl is eager to go and they meet Miranda and her friends. They play a game of Spin The Bottle and Sylvie wishes to be kissed by Carl. Unfortunately, he does not kiss her (but to Sylvie's surprise he kisses Miranda) and Sylvie realizes that his feelings have changed. Carl invites Miranda, Sylvie and a boy called Paul to go bowling with him. Sylvie does not like Paul and is surprised when Carl tells Sylvie that he wanted to impress Paul by bowling.

On Carl's birthday, Miranda, Paul, Sylvie and Carl go to Kew Gardens since Carl is obsessed with glass. They all get lost while playing hide-and-seek. Miranda and Paul went on the train so Carl and Sylvie go with Carl's mother, Jules. Carl refused to see anyone after that night and later tells Sylvie that he is gay. Sylvie then finds out that Carl had found Paul during hide-and-seek and kissed him. Paul kissed him back for a moment 'like he really cared about [Carl]', but then pushed him away, claiming Carl is a pervert. Carl gets teased and picked on at school.

Later, Sylvie goes to find Carl and sees the Glass Hut (where Carl keeps his glass collection) is ruined with glass everywhere. Sylvie gets cut and tells Jules, Mick (Carl's father) and Jake (Carl's older brother) about the Glass Hut. They see Carl in the bushes all cut from smashing all the glass. He cut all his fingers and wrists and needed many stitches. Carl comes out to his mother at the hospital (when asked why he smashed the glass) and she tells him she has no problem with him being gay.

Miranda and Sylvie bunk off school to meet Carl in McDonald's for lunch, and after hearing about how he is being bullied at school, Miranda persuades Sylvie to meet Carl after school, impressing all the boys who see them.

In the Glass Hut, Carl and Sylvie see all the damage. Sylvie thinks that Carl will not feel the same about her. Carl kisses her and says he will always love her, platonically. Sylvie states that it wasn't the kiss she was hoping for but is still satisfied.

== Reception ==
Kiss was one of six novels to be nominated for the 2008 Worcestershire Teen Book Award.
