= Titty Ho =

Road in Raunds, Northamptonshire, England

Coordinates: 52.33994°N 0.54469°W

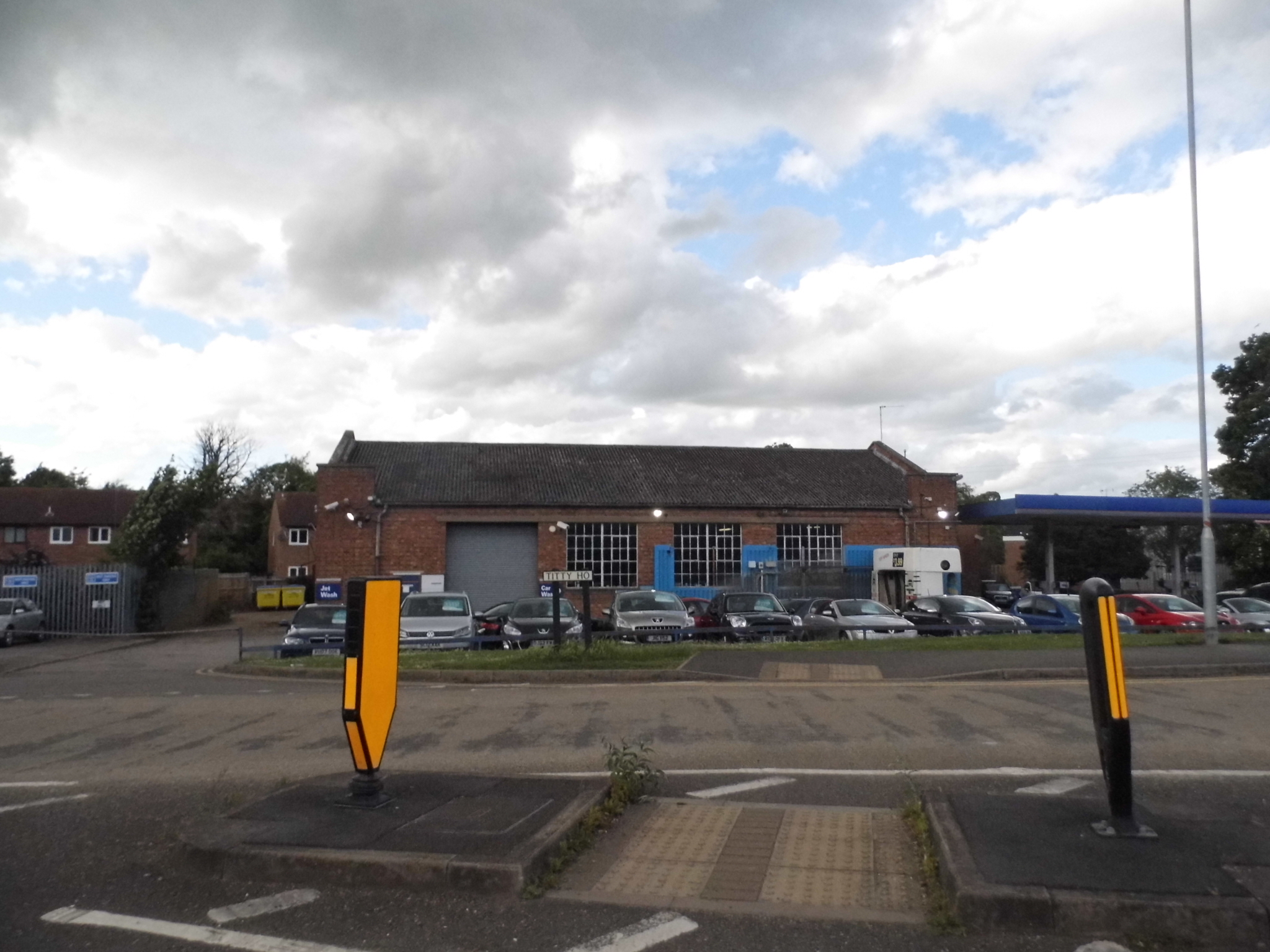

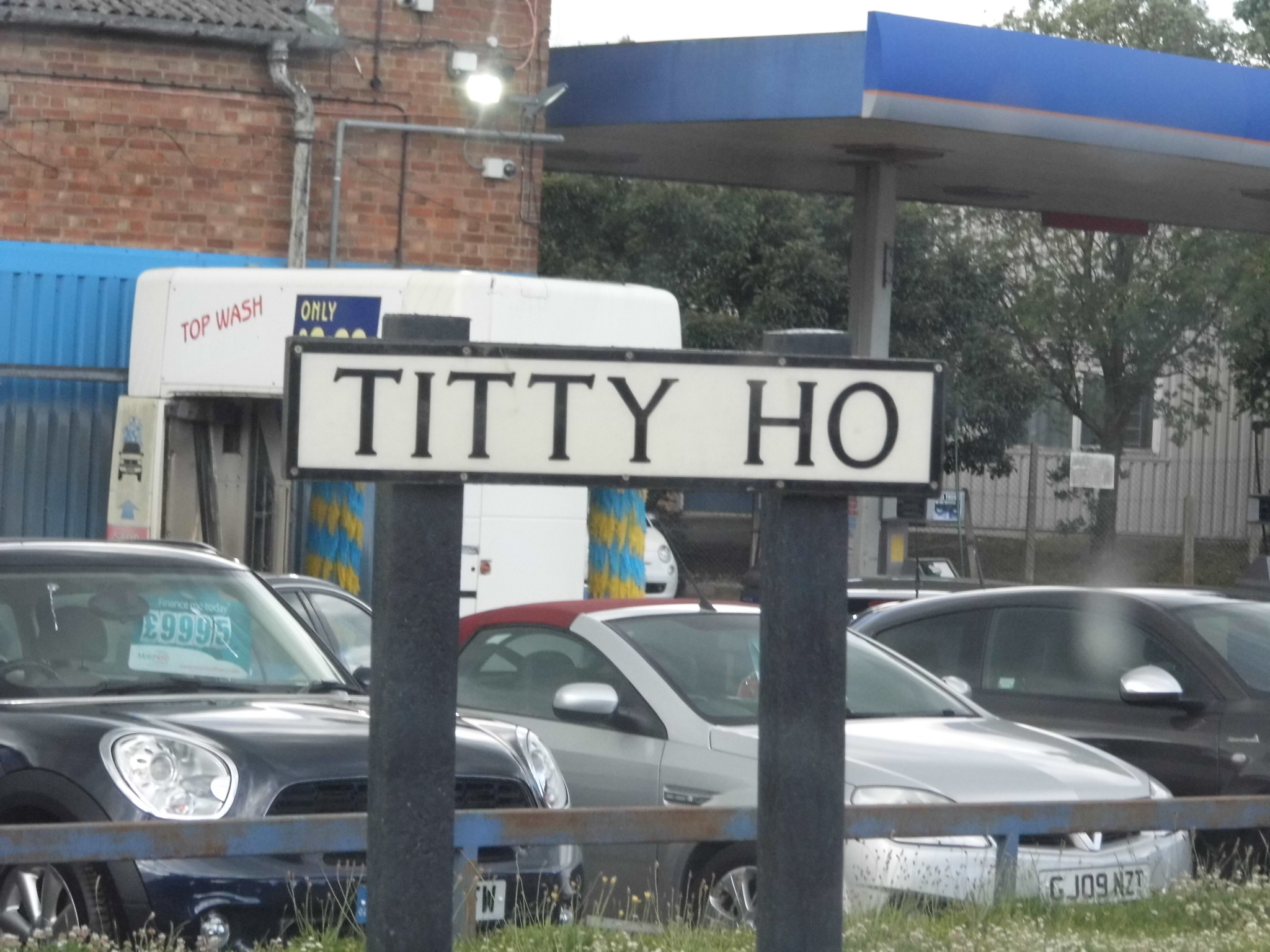
- Street sign for Titty Ho

- Location within Northamptonshire
- OS grid reference: SP992723
- Civil parish: Raunds
- Unitary authority: North Northamptonshire
- Ceremonial county: Northamptonshire
- Region: East Midlands
- Country: England
- Sovereign state: United Kingdom
- Post town: Wellingborough
- Postcode district: NN9
- Dialling code: 01933
- UK Parliament: Corby and East Northamptonshire

Titty Ho is a road and surrounding area in the south of Raunds, a market town in Northamptonshire. It gained internet notoriety in the late 2010s for having a name considered unusual. The borders of Titty Ho are not defined.

== Name ==
Titty Ho is famous for its name, which includes the vulgar slang term for breast, titty and the vulgar slang term for prostitute, ho. The etymology of the area is relatively unknown. It appeared in the 2005 book Rude Britain that highlights the "100 rudest place names in Britain" which notes that "Titty" may refer to the bird or to a family surname, and that "Ho" may be an abbreviation of the word house, despite the word "Ho!" found in another English place name. The book additionally notes that the 'village' of Titty Ho appeared in the Channel 4 show Time Team in 2003.

Titty Ho appears in press and tabloids due to its name. It has been featured in The Telegraph, The New York Times and BBC News.

In 2021, Oxfordshire resident Paul Taylor visited Titty Ho on his moped trip through the most unusually-named places in England and Scotland, a fundraiser for the Institute of Cancer Research that started in Shitterton and included destinations such as Pity Me and Dull, Perth and Kinross.
