= Twatt, Orkney =

Coordinates: 59.098°N 3.274°W

Twatt
- Location within Orkney
- OS grid reference: HY270242
- Civil parish: Birsay
- Council area: Orkney Islands
- Lieutenancy area: Orkney Islands
- Country: Scotland
- Sovereign state: United Kingdom
- Post town: ORKNEY
- Postcode district: KW17
- Dialling code: 01856
- Police: Scotland
- Fire: Scottish
- Ambulance: Scottish
- UK Parliament: Orkney and Shetland
- Scottish Parliament: Orkney

Twatt is a settlement in the parish of Birsay on the Mainland of Orkney, Scotland. It was previously the location of RNAS Twatt (HMS Tern), from 1940–1949. Twatt is situated at the junction of the A986 and the A967.

== Toponymy ==
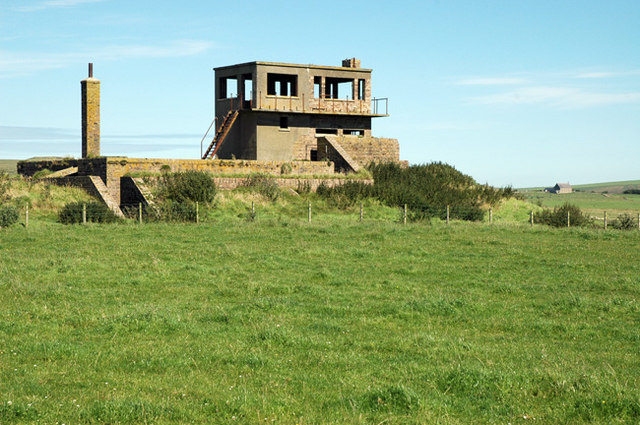
Remains at Twatt airfield

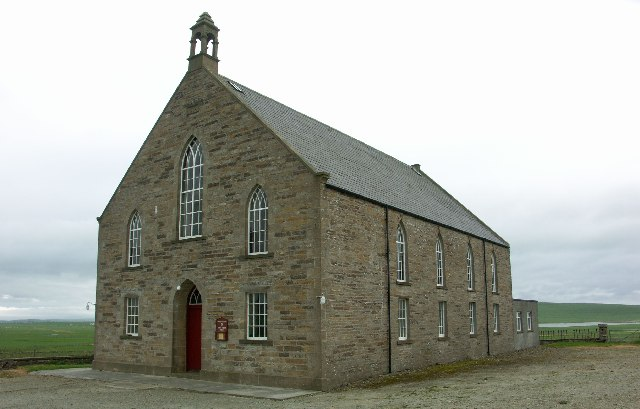
Twatt Church

The settlement name originates from the Old Norse þveit, meaning 'small parcel of land'. The Norse word commonly produces in England the place name element Thwaite.

The name Twatt is similar to the common English expletive twat, a vulgar word for vulva and also an insulting term meaning a weak or contemptible individual. For this reason, Twatt remains a source of amusement to people from outside the parish, as a result the road sign has been removed due to persistent thefts. Its name featured at no. 4 of the most vulgar sounding names in Rude Britain, along with its Shetland namesake.

== Local services ==
A post office opened at Twatt on 1 November 1879. It closed on 10 April 2002.
