= Granard Motte =

Ruined Norman castle in County Longford, Ireland

- Móta Ghránaird
- Church Street, Granard, County Longford in Ireland
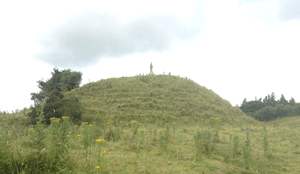

Location
- Coordinates: 53.775535°N 7.500468°W

Site history
- Built: 1199
- Materials: earth

National monument of Ireland
- Official name: Granard
- Reference no.: 263

Granard Motte is the remains of a motte-and-bailey castle and National Monument in Granard, County Longford, Ireland.

== Location ==
Granard Motte (RMP LF010-080001) is located in the town of Granard, 5.7 km (3.5 mi) west of Lough Kinale, overlooking the Inny valley. At an altitude of 163 m (535 ft) it is the highest motte in Ireland

The earthworks lie about 220 metres (720 ft) to the southwest of Granard town on an elevated site with panoramic views of the surrounding countryside.

== History ==
Granard motte earthworks were built c. 1199 by a Norman knight, Richard de Tuit. It was erected upon and within a pre-existing hillfort (LF010-080002-), and has associations with a local branch of the Ó Fearghail clan (Farrell).

It appears that it was intended as a frontier castle on the NW border of the Anglo-Norman lordship of Meath and designed to suppress the O'Reilly's of S Breffny. In 1210 King John stayed here during his campaign against Hugh de Lacy. The site later became known as Rath Granard. According to Bradley, it is the most likely location of the inauguration site of the O'Farrells (Bán). One prominent member of the family, Sean Ó Fearghail, Chief of Annaly, is believed to have died here immediately after his inauguration in 1475 and was interred at Abbeylara nearby.

The relatively level summit (27 m (89 ft) in the NNW-SSE direction; 22 m (72 ft) in the ENE-WSW direction), is about 4 m (13 ft) above the level of the bailey and also holds an OS trigonometrical station. In 1932 a statue of Saint Patrick was erected on top of the motte to mark the sesquimillennium of his mission to Ireland.

Many myths are attached to the hollow within the motte: some say there is a castle concealed within it, or gold, or perhaps a grain store. In May 2017 the motte came to nationwide attention when a large hole, about a metre in diameter, was found dug into the side of the mound. The damage required a survey by the National Monuments Service and repairs by the Office of Public Works.

== Description ==
The Motte is a great flat-topped, circular earthen mound, on top of which would have been a timber tower surrounded by a palisade. Across the base was a U-shaped bailey: an enclosure surrounded by a palisade ditch. It is very strongly fortified except on the southern side, which seems to have been guarded solely by the deep trench on the summit. The sub circular mound is about 9 m (30 ft) in height with a deep fosse at the northeastern side and a D-shaped bailey on the southwest side.

A grotto was built into the north side of the monument in 1925 in the course of which a large quantity of stone was removed (using explosives). From WSW-N-ENE the base of the motte is encircled by a wide, deep, steep-sided, rock-cut fosse (width: 10.5 m (34 ft); depth: 3.5 m (11 ft)) with a wide, high, steep-sided external bank (width: 8 m (26 ft); height: 2.9 m (9.5 ft)). The bailey is defined by the remains of an inner bank of earth and stone, a wide, deep, intervening fosse (width: 12 m (39 ft)) and a wide, high outer bank (width: c. 10 m (33 ft); height: c. 2 m (6.6 ft)). The fragmentary remains of a later castle are visible in the SE face of the motte. A medieval church and graveyard lie c. 100 m (330 ft) to the north.
