= Bosc-Bénard-Commin =

- Part of Grand-Bourgtheroulde
- Location of Bosc-Bénard-Commin
- Location within France Location within Normandy
- Coordinates: 49°19′07″N 0°50′58″E
- Country: France
- Region: Normandy
- Department: Eure
- Arrondissement: Bernay
- Canton: Bourgtheroulde-Infreville
- Commune: Grand-Bourgtheroulde
- Area^{1}: 4.21 km^{2} (1.63 sq mi)
- Elevation: 120 m (390 ft)
- Highest elevation: 141 m (463 ft)
- Lowest elevation: 90 m (300 ft)
- Population (2017): 319
  - Density: 75.8/km^{2} (196/sq mi)
- Time zone: UTC+01:00 (CET)
  - Summer (DST): UTC+02:00 (CEST)
- Postal code: 27520
- ^{1} French Land Register data, which excludes lakes, ponds, glaciers > 1 km^{2} (0.386 sq mi or 247 acres) and river estuaries.

Bosc-Bénard-Commin (French pronunciation: [bo benaʁ kɔmɛ̃]) is a former commune in the Eure department in Normandy in northern France.

== History ==
On 1 January 2016, Bosc-Bénard-Commin, Bourgtheroulde-Infreville and Thuit-Hébert merged becoming one commune called Grand-Bourgtheroulde.

== See also ==
- Communes of the Eure department
