= Secretarial Order 3404 =

United States secretarial order

- Declaring "Squaw" a Derogatory Term and Implementing Procedures to Remove the Term from Federal Usage
- Type: Secretarial order
- Number: 3404
- Secretary of the Interior: Deb Haaland
- President: Joe Biden
- Date: November 19, 2021

Secretarial Order 3404 was an order given by then United States Secretary of the Interior Deb Haaland to order that the name squaw, which is a derogatory term towards Native American women, be removed from federal usage, especially by the Board on Geographic Names. It also ordered the creation of the Derogatory Geographic Names Task Force.

== Background ==
The word squaw is a term that has been used as a derogatory term towards Native American women since the 17th century. The term was used to name a number of places and as of 2021, there were over 650 places on the GNIS with the word "squaw" in their name.

== Provisions ==
The order calls for place names containing the word "squaw" to be reviewed by the Derogatory Geographic Names Task Force. This is made up of representatives from federal land agencies and DEI experts from the Department of the Interior. By order, the Derogatory Geographic Names Task Force must have been established by December 19, 2021.

== Aftermath ==
On September 8, 2022, the Department of the Interior announced that the process had been complete. After consultation with over 70 tribes and after 650 names were changed, Secretary Haaland noted in "I feel a deep obligation to use my platform to ensure that our public lands and waters are accessible and welcoming."
