= Lövsele =

- Village
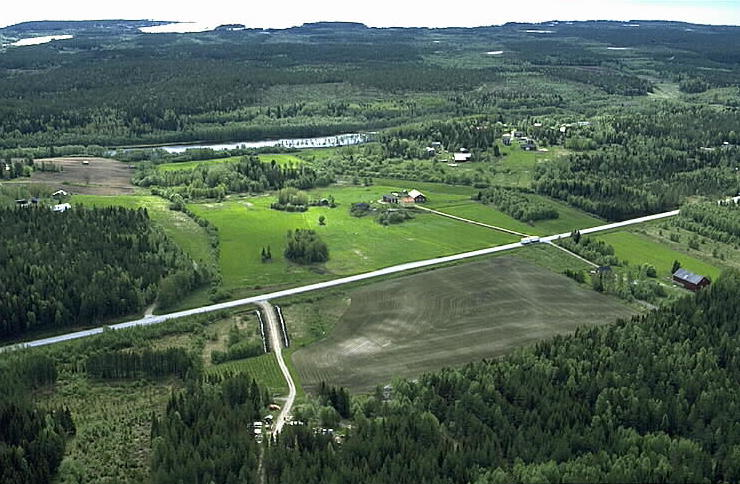
- The E4 road passing through Lövsele, with the lake in the background

- Location within Västerbotten Location within Sweden
- Coordinates: 64°19′58″N 21°16′22″E
- Country: Sweden
- County: Västerbotten
- Municipality: Skellefteå

Lövsele is a village in the socken of Lövånger in Skellefteå Municipality, Västerbotten County, Sweden. The village is located by European route E4, about five kilometres (3.1 mi) south of Lövånger.

== History ==
The village was originally known as Kräkånger, i.e. "crooked inlet", a name derived from the adjoining lake, which was formerly an arm of the much larger Avafjärden. The name was changed in 1951 due to its association with the verb kräkas, meaning "to vomit" (the neighbouring hamlet of Kräkångersnoret, or Kräkånger Sound, had a doubly unfortunate name, as its final element called to mind the word snoret, meaning "snot"). The current name was created by combining the first element of Lövånger with the dialectal word sele, meaning "lake".
