= My Sister Jodie =

2008 novel by Jacqueline Wilson

- Author: Jacqueline Wilson
- Illustrator: Nick Sharratt
- Cover artist: Nick Sharratt
- Language: English, (others)
- Series: School
- Genre: Children's novel school novel
- Publisher: Doubleday
- Publication date: March 13, 2008 (hardback) December 4, 2009 (paperback)
- Publication place: United Kingdom
- Media type: Print (hardback) (Paperback)
- Pages: 400 pp
- ISBN: 0-385-61012-2
- OCLC: 182663431
- Preceded by: Kiss
- Followed by: Cookie

My Sister Jodie is a 2008 children's novel by English author Jacqueline Wilson. The story explores the relationship between two sisters, Pearl and Jodie, who are opposites and what happens when their parents get jobs at a boarding school.

== Plot summary ==
Pearl and Jodie Wells are sisters. Jodie, 14, is boisterous, mischievous and very protective of her younger sister. She dyes her hair, pierces her ears and dresses in an outlandish way, constantly irritating her mother. Pearl, 10, is a shy bookworm, who thinks the world of Jodie. Their mother and father, Sharon and Joe, decide to move to Melchester College, a boarding school in the countryside, where they have both been offered new jobs as a cook and caretaker, respectively. They would like to give the girls an opportunity to receive a quality education. Jodie does not want to move, because she is settled at her current school, where she is friends with the popular girls. She is even more horrified when her mother says that she will have to retake Year 8. Pearl, however, is glad because she is constantly bullied at her school. She sees the move as an opportunity to have a fresh start, in a different place with a different life. Even though she refuses at first, Jodie finally says that she will move, when Pearl asks her to.

When the family arrive at Melchester, they meet Miss French, the school secretary. On their first night at the school, they are invited to dinner at the residence of Mr. Wilberforce, the Headmaster, and his wife.

As it is the summer holidays only four children, who have not gone home for the holidays, are living in the school. The sisters meet tall, badger-watching Harley, who gets along very well with Pearl, and three little children: Zeph, Dan and Sakura. They also meet other members of the staff: the under matron, Miss Ponsonby (nicknamed "Undie"), and the gardener, Jed. Jodie and Jed are attracted to each other, almost immediately, even though he is five years older than she is.

On Pearl's eleventh birthday, her mother insists that she have a small party with all the children. Among her presents are a rainbow bracelet from Jodie, a manuscript book from Mrs. Wilberforce and a torch from Harley. Mrs. Wilberforce invites her to write her own story in the notebook, and Harley asks her to use the torch to sneak out and watch badgers with him at night. Even though at first Pearl is scared, she begins to enjoy her nightly escapades with Harley and savours the fact that she can keep a secret from Jodie. Eventually, Jodie finds out and confronts Pearl about it, thinking that her and Harley are meeting romantically. Pearl reassures her that they are only watching badgers and that they have not invited her because she can't stay still or silent for more than a few minutes.

When the school reopens, Pearl makes quite a few friends in her class and enjoys her lessons. Jodie, on the other hand, does not have such an easy time. The students in her class constantly mock her and she does not take lessons seriously. After being referred to as "Ginger Minger" for some time, she dyes her hair black, although the ginger makes it go purple. Soon after, Jed runs over a baby badger that Harley and Pearl have been watching, and Jodie is disgusted at his indifference. She immediately declares that she does not want to see him anymore. However, Pearl is worried when she discovers a used and positive pregnancy test in their bathroom, even though Jodie denies that it is hers.

A few weeks after the school has reopened, Mr. Wilberforce asks Jodie to tell all the little children a bed-time story each night. Jodie, having fallen out with Jed and not fit in with her class, happily agrees.

At the school's Halloween party, Jodie and Pearl dress up and play with the younger children. At the end of the night, Jodie takes the little boys back to their dormitory, where she tells them a ghost story; while Pearl takes the little girls to their dormitory, where she tells them a story about pumpkin patch fairies. Many of the boys fall ill and have terrible nightmares. Mr. Wilberforce decides to punish Jodie by asking her to stand in front of the whole school and tell them that ghosts are not real. She is then asked to stop telling the children bed-time stories, a job which Pearl is offered instead. She reluctantly accepts, even though she feels that she is betraying Jodie. To make matters worse, all of Jodie's classmates seem to find her even more of a laughing stock.

On Guy Fawkes Night, Jodie climbs up to the tower of the gothic building, looking like a ghost. While the window is open, she trips in her heels and falls out of the tower, causing her neck to break, killing her.

Pearl and her parents are devastated, especially when the newspapers speculate about whether or not Jodie intended to kill herself. They leave Melchester College and move into a block of flats in London, where Joe is the handyman. However, before they move, Sharon reveals that she is pregnant and Pearl realises that the pregnancy test was her mother's. While Pearl is not very keen when she first finds out about the baby, she soon grows to love her new sister, May. She uses the book Mrs. Wilberforce gave her to write the story of her and Jodie, so that May can read it when she is older. Pearl promises to be a good big sister to May, but says that she will never be one as good as Jodie was to her.

== Characters ==
- Pearl – the narrator of the story, Pearl is shy and quiet and adores her older sister. She turns 11 in the book. She is good friends with Harley with whom she watches badgers, and Mrs. Wilberforce, who lends her books from her personal library.
- Jodie – The titular character, Jodie is Pearl's rebellious older sister. She is 14 years old. Before the book begins, she dyed her hair orange with gold streaks and, in the course of the narrative, dyed it black. She is constantly being told off by her mother, but gets along with her father. At the end of the book, Jodie dies by falling and breaking her neck, trying to show the little ones that ghosts aren't real.
- Harley – Despite being closer to Jodie's age and in her class, Harley is better friends with Pearl, with whom he watches badgers. He is 13 years old and very tall at six feet and four inches. He stays at Melchester during the summer holidays, because he does not want to spend them with his mother and stepfather. He continues to keep in touch with Pearl after she leaves Melchester with her parents.
- Sharon – The mother of Jodie, Pearl and May and the wife of Joe, Sharon is hired to be the cook at Melchester College. She is constantly lecturing or telling off Jodie for not appreciating all the things that the former never had as a child.
- Joe – The father of Jodie, Pearl and May and the husband of Sharon, Joe is hired to be the caretaker at Melchester College. He frequently acts as a mediator between Jodie and Sharon when they do not get along.
- Zeph, Dan and Sakura – Three children who stay at Melchester during the summer holidays for different reasons and become Jodie's favourites of all the children. Sakura is a delicate, shy Japanese girl who gets along with Pearl. Zeph is a Black British boy who loves food. Dan carries around a transparent man from a biology kit whose internal organs are visible. All three keep in touch with Pearl after she leaves Melchester.
- Harriet, Sheba, Freya, and Clarissa – best Friends, aka girl friends and classmates of Pearl's who are amazed that Pearl is friends with Harley. Clarissa, who has a cousin in Jodie's class, sometimes mocks Jodie in front of Pearl. Harriet and Pearl grow close and keep in touch after Pearl leaves Melchester.
- Harold and Cynthia Wilberforce – Former residents of Melchester Mansion, which Mrs. Wilberforce's family turned into a boarding school. After falling down the spiral stairs in the tower, she uses a wheelchair, having lost the use of one arm and both legs. She stays in touch with Pearl after Pearl leaves Melchester with her parents. Mr. Wilberforce is now the Headmaster.
- Jed – The wild-looking school gardener, Jed is attracted to Jodie when they first meet. He is 18 years old. He quickly gets tired of Jodie and doesn't seem to mind when she leaves him because he killed a badger cub.
- May – The third daughter of Joe and Sharon, and Pearl and Jodie's younger sister. May is born at the end of the book. Pearl says that she is not like Jodie or like Pearl, but just like herself.
- Miss French – The secretary of the school, Miss French spends a lot of time with Mr. Wilberforce. It is implied that the two do not have a relationship that is strictly professional. She owns a big dog named Shep and regularly encourages Jodie to take him for long walks.

== Reception ==
A review in Reading Time said that My Sister Jodie "is not up to [Wilson's] usual high standards", complaining that "most of the characters are just not likable".
