= Battle of Bourgthéroulde =

1124 skirmish

- Part of Henry I's campaigns in Normandy
Date	26 March 1124
Location	Brotonne forest, north-west of Bourgtheroulde
Result	Royal victory, rebel cause severely harmed

Belligerents
Supporters of Henry I	Norman rebels

Commanders and leaders
Odo Borleng; William of Tankerville; Ralph of Bayeux	Waleran de Beaumont; Amaury III de Montfort

Strength
300 men	40 knights

Casualties and losses
Unknown, low	Unknown, most captured

The Battle of Bourgthéroulde was a skirmish between the forces of king Henry I of England led by Odo Borleng and rebel forces led by Waleran de Beaumont which took place on 26 March 1124.

The battle took place south-west of Rouen in the Duchy of Normandy, not far from the location of the Battle of Brémule which had been fought five years earlier. The exact site of the battle is unknown. Although the battle is considered to be a minor skirmish between two small bands of soldiers, it had a profound impact on the stability of the region during a time when the ownership of the duchy was in question. The battle was the first of many early examples of the English primarily using archers and infantry (in this case, dismounted cavalry) in battle before the infantry revolution and the Hundred Years' War. After the battle, the English would continue to employ this tactic, as seen in the Battle of the Standard, but would later drop its use for more conventional medieval tactics in the late 12th and 13th centuries.

== Origin ==
Rebellions and wars had been occurring in the Duchy of Normandy for over two decades before the events of the battle. Robert Curthose, Henry's older brother and Duke of Normandy, attacked Henry to take the throne of England for himself; this prompted Henry to invade Normandy, ending in the Battle of Tinchebray and allowed Henry to usurp the title for himself. Constant border conflicts with France and a claim to the Duchy by William Clito, Robert's son, prompted Louis VI of France to invade Normandy, and ended in the Battle of Brémule which was an English victory. Norman rebels who continued to support William's claim to the Duchy continued to cause disorder in the region. One of these rebels, Waleran de Beaumont, Count of Meulan, led a force of approximately 40 local knights, including Amaury de Montfort, to raid the area south-west of Rouen near Vatteville. In response to the raids, Odo Borleng, castellan of Bernay, gathered knights of Henry's household known as the Familia Regis, and raised a force from the local garrisons. In total, the English army numbered around 300 men. The king himself, however, did not attend the campaign and resided in Caen at the time. Other notable members of Odo's party were William of Tancarville, the king's chamberlain, and Ralph of Bayeux, the castellan of Evreux. Waleran's force was making its way from the rebellion's main headquarters at the castle of Beaumont-le-Roger to raid when their path was blocked by Odo's army on March 26. The forces met in the Brotonne forest north-west of Bourgtheroulde although little is known about the exact details of the terrain where the battle took place.

== Battle ==
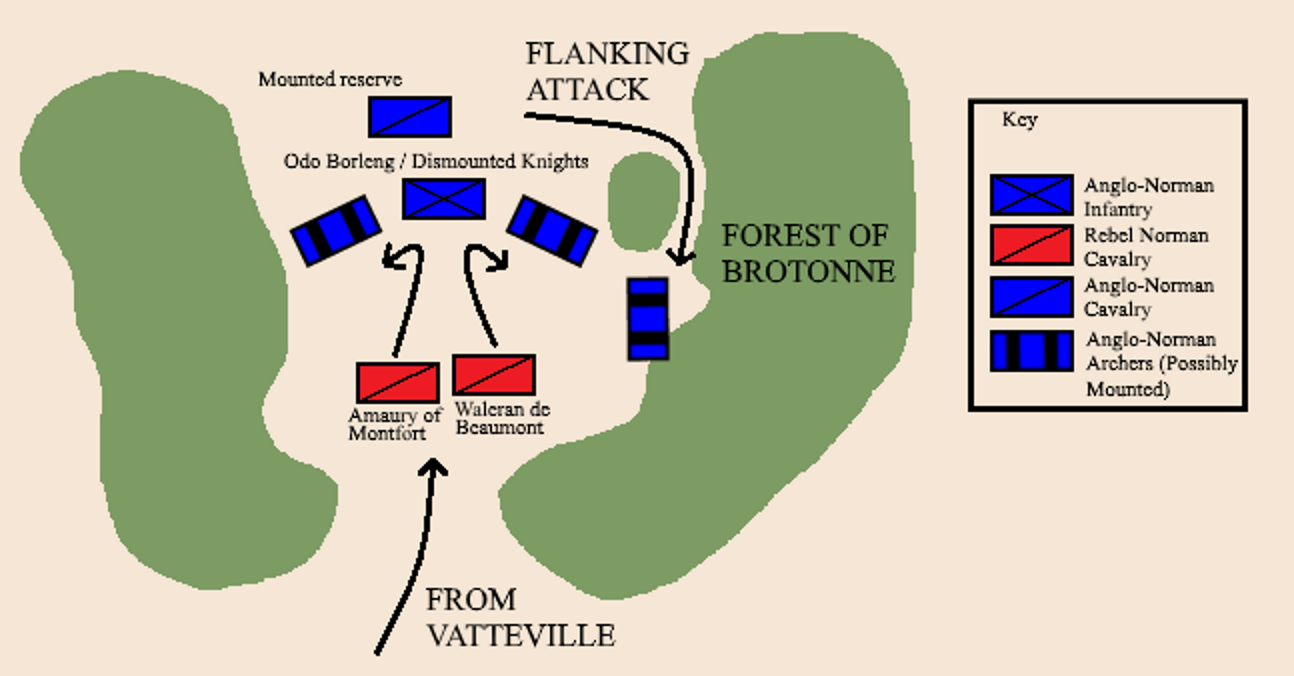
Overview of the battlefield

Odo decided to dismount most of his knights, including himself, contrary to the conventional mounted tactics employed by knights of the time. Furthermore, he placed 40 archers on the front line to weaken the enemy cavalry before they could reach his force, specifically by targeting their horses. Some primary sources of the battle also claim that the English had horse archers that were used to flank the enemy; however, this was extremely rare in western Europe at the time and is considered unlikely. Waleran's plan of attack was simply to charge the English line with his mounted knights, which he attempted to do. The English archers fired their arrows continuously as the rebels charged, unhorsing most of them before even making contact with the English knights on foot. Presumably, the mounted cavalry that were held in reserve were immediately tasked with chasing down any fleeing enemies and were able to capture them, including Waleran himself.

== Aftermath ==
Most of the rebels were captured, and there were no fatalities. Henry brought up the question of the fate of the rebels with his court in Rouen. Two of the rebels, Geoffrey de Tourville and Odo du Pin, refused to pay homage to the king and were thus sentenced to be blinded, while another rebel by the name of Luke of Barre was to be punished similarly for writing satirical poems about the king; however, on hearing his fate he committed suicide via self-inflicted head trauma. Waleran was treated well relative to his former allies and was imprisoned first at Rouen, then at Bridgnorth in Shropshire and finally at Wallingford Castle, before being released in 1129. Overall, the result of this conflict was in favour of Henry, who brought an end to the conflicts in Normandy in his lifetime.
