= Twatt, Shetland =

Coordinates: 60.263°N 1.408°W

Twatt
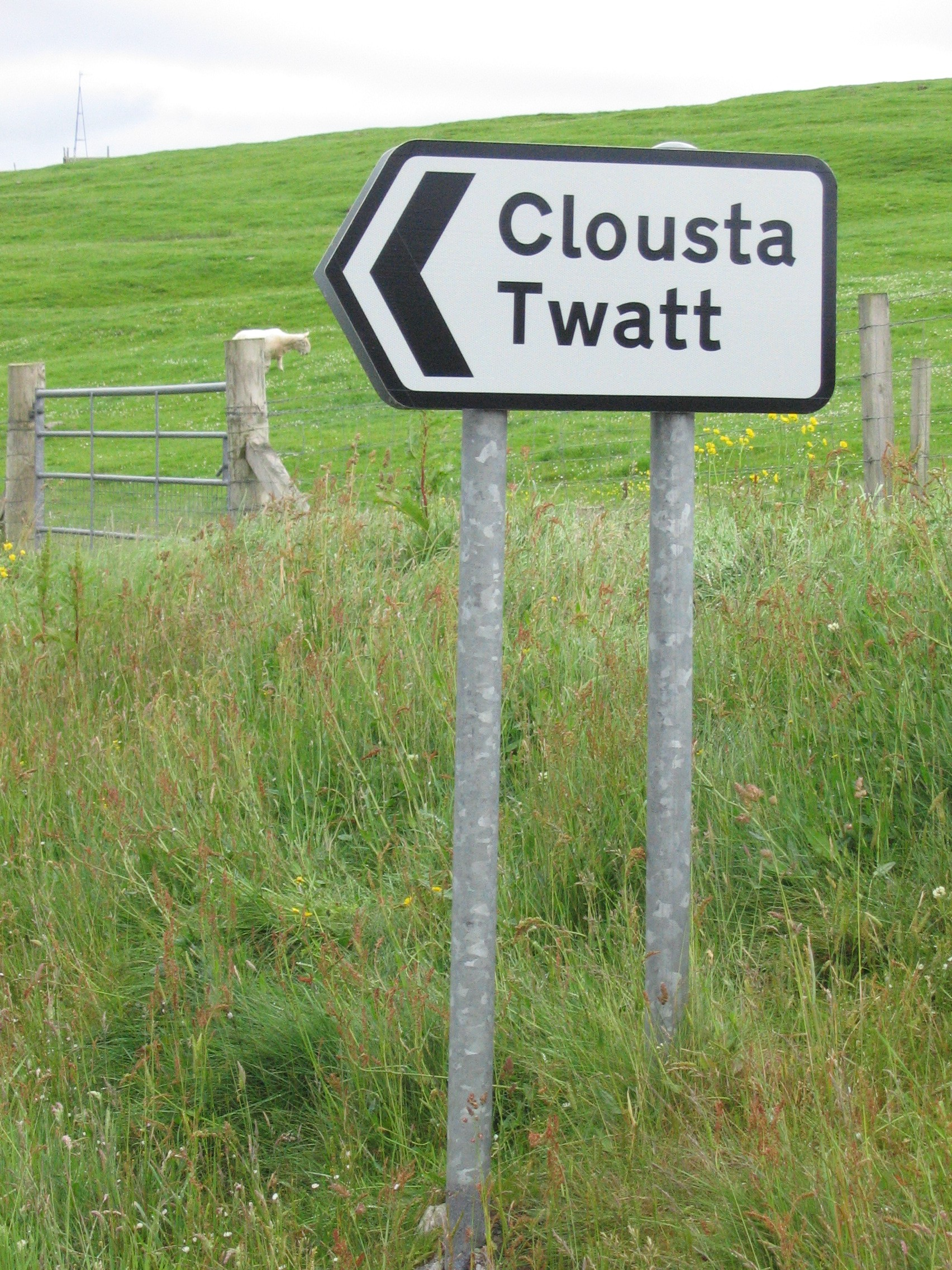
- Road sign pointing to Twatt

- Location within Shetland
- OS grid reference: HU327532
- Civil parish: Sandsting
- Council area: Shetland
- Lieutenancy area: Shetland
- Country: Scotland
- Sovereign state: United Kingdom
- Post town: SHETLAND
- Postcode district: ZE2
- Dialling code: 01595
- Police: Scotland
- Fire: Scottish
- Ambulance: Scottish
- UK Parliament: Orkney and Shetland
- Scottish Parliament: Shetland

Twatt (Shaetlan pronunciation: [twat] TWAT) is a settlement in the Shetland Islands of Scotland. It is located on the Shetland Mainland on a minor road that leads from the A971 road to Clousta, north of Bixter. The settlement is within the parish of Sandsting.

The settlement name originates from the Old Norse þveit, meaning 'small parcel of land'. The Norse word commonly produces in England the place name element Thwaite.

The name Twatt is similar to the common English expletive twat, a vulgar word for vulva and also an insulting term meaning a weak or contemptible individual. For this reason, Twatt remains a source of amusement to people from outside the parish. Its name featured at no. 4 of the most vulgar sounding names in Rude Britain, along with its Orkney namesake.
