= Le Thuit-de-l'Oison =

- Commune
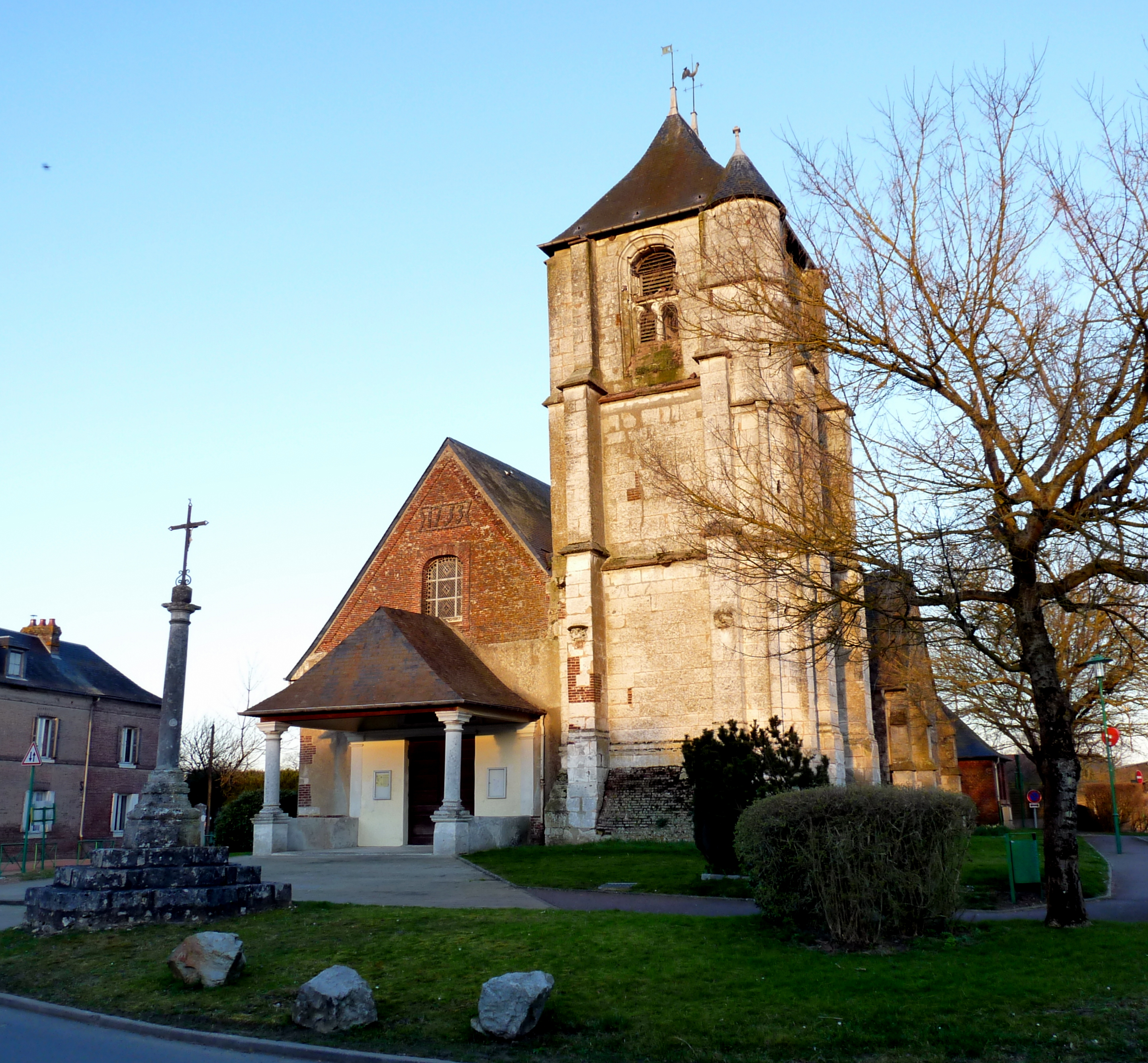
- The church in Le Thuit-Signol
- Location of Le Thuit-de-l'Oison
- Location within France Location within Normandy
- Coordinates: 49°15′54″N 0°56′13″E
- Country: France
- Region: Normandy
- Department: Eure
- Arrondissement: Bernay
- Canton: Grand Bourgtheroulde

Government
  - Mayor (2020–2026): Gilbert Doubet
- Area^{1}: 15.58 km^{2} (6.02 sq mi)
- Population (2023): 3,827
  - Density: 245.6/km^{2} (636.2/sq mi)
- Time zone: UTC+01:00 (CET)
  - Summer (DST): UTC+02:00 (CEST)
- INSEE/Postal code: 27638 /27370
- ^{1} French Land Register data, which excludes lakes, ponds, glaciers > 1 km^{2} (0.386 sq mi or 247 acres) and river estuaries.

Le Thuit-de-l'Oison (French pronunciation: [lə tɥi də lwazɔ̃]) is a commune in the department of Eure, northern France. The municipality was established on 1 January 2016 by merger of the former communes of Le Thuit-Signol, Le Thuit-Anger and Le Thuit-Simer.

== Population ==
Population data refer to the commune in its geography as of January 2025.

Historical population
Year	Pop.	±% p.a.
1968	1,062	—
1975	1,746	+7.36%
1982	2,461	+5.03%
1990	2,636	+0.86%
1999	2,697	+0.25%
2007	3,095	+1.74%
2012	3,340	+1.54%
2017	3,619	+1.62%
2023	3,827	+0.94%
Source: INSEE

== See also ==
- Communes of the Eure department
