= Baie des Ha! Ha! =

Baie des Ha! Ha! may refer to the following places in Canada:

- Baie des Ha! Ha! (Saguenay River), a cove in the region of Saguenay–Lac-Saint-Jean, Quebec
- Baie des Ha! Ha! (Côte-Nord), a bay in Gros-Mécatina, Le Golfe-du-Saint-Laurent Regional County Municipality, Côte-Nord, Quebec
- Baie-des-Ha!-Ha! (Baie de la Terre), an abandoned settlement of Gros-Mécatina, Quebec

== See also ==
- Minnehaha
- Haha (disambiguation)
- Ha Ha Bay, on the island of Newfoundland, Newfoundland and Labrador
- Saint-Louis-du-Ha! Ha!, in the Témiscouata Regional County Municipality in Quebec
