= Rude Britain =

British book

Rude Britain: 100 Rudest Place Names in Britain
- Author: Rob Bailey, Ed Hurst
- Publication date: 2005
- Publication place: United Kingdom
- ISBN: 0-7522-2581-2

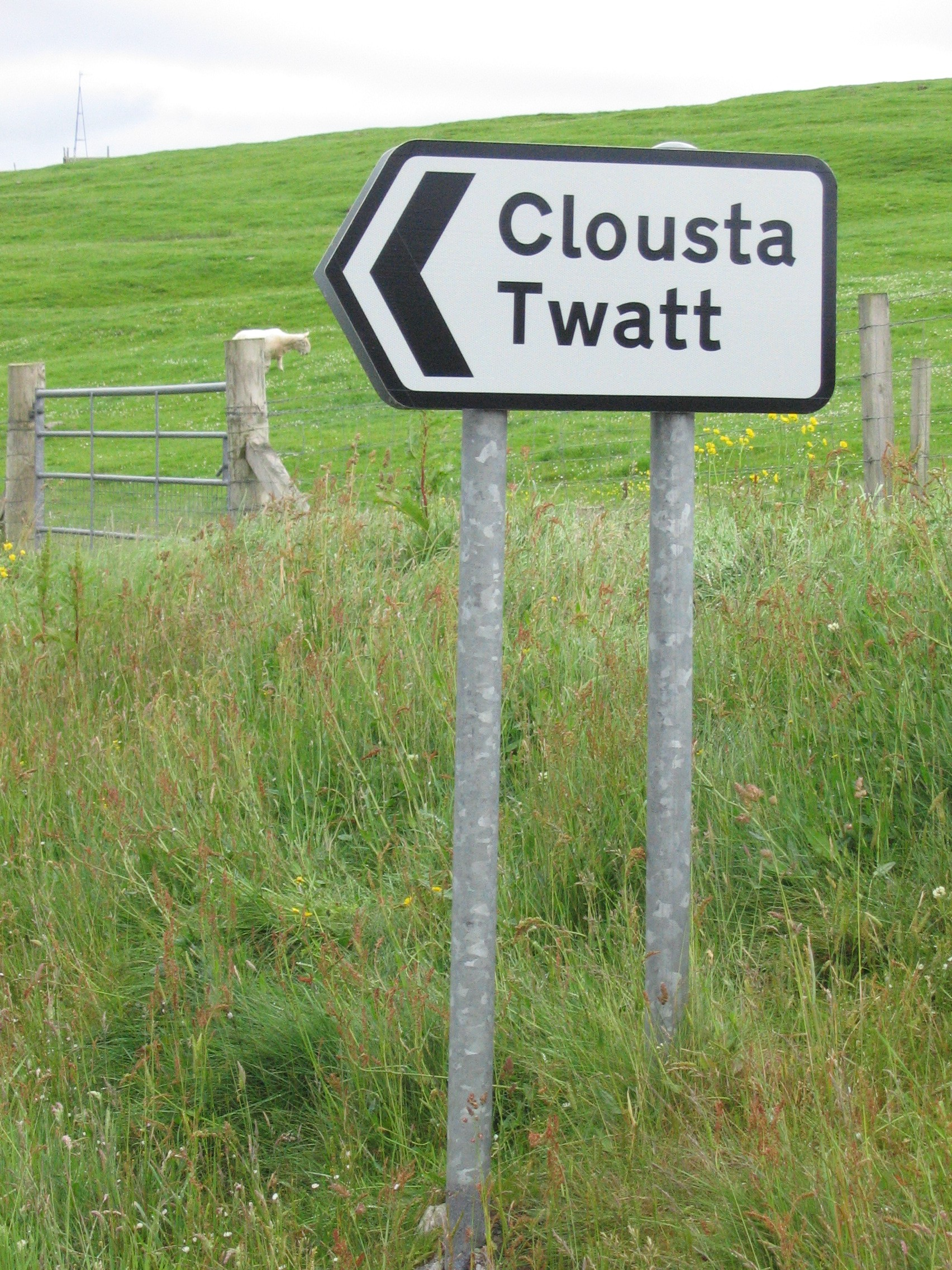
Road sign pointing to Twatt, Shetland

Rude Britain (subtitled 100 Rudest Place Names in Britain) is a 2005 book of British place names with seemingly rude or offensive meanings. The book (ISBN 0-7522-2581-2) is written by Rob Bailey and Ed Hurst, and published in the United Kingdom by the Pan Macmillan imprint Boxtree.

Each of the 100 names chosen by the authors is accompanied by a photograph and a placename etymology. The etymologies are often due to Great Britain's history of repeated invasion, occupation, and assimilation, combined with a human predilection for double entendres.

Entries include North Piddle (from the Old English word pidele, meaning marsh), Pratt's Bottom, Ugley, Titty Ho, and Spital-in-the-Street (a hamlet in Lincolnshire with a name based on the Middle English spitel, meaning hospital).

== See also ==
- Scunthorpe problem – Problem caused by profanity filters on the Internet
