= Le Thuit-Signol =

- Part of Le Thuit-de-l'Oison
- Coat of arms
- Location of Le Thuit-Signol
- Location within France Location within Normandy
- Coordinates: 49°15′57″N 0°56′27″E
- Country: France
- Region: Normandy
- Department: Eure
- Arrondissement: Bernay
- Canton: Bourgtheroulde-Infreville
- Commune: Le Thuit-de-l'Oison
- Area^{1}: 9.81 km^{2} (3.79 sq mi)
- Elevation: 174 m (571 ft)
- Highest elevation: 179 m (587 ft)
- Lowest elevation: 103 m (338 ft)
- Population (2018): 2,463
  - Density: 251/km^{2} (650/sq mi)
- Time zone: UTC+01:00 (CET)
  - Summer (DST): UTC+02:00 (CEST)
- Postal code: 27370
- ^{1} French Land Register data, which excludes lakes, ponds, glaciers > 1 km^{2} (0.386 sq mi or 247 acres) and river estuaries.

Le Thuit-Signol (French pronunciation: [lə tɥi siɲɔl]) is a former commune in the Eure department in Normandy in northern France. On 1 January 2016, it was merged into the new commune of Le Thuit-de-l'Oison.

== Population ==
Historical population
Year	Pop.	±% p.a.
1962	532	—
1968	602	+2.08%
1975	1,175	+10.03%
1982	1,574	+4.26%
1990	1,649	+0.58%
1999	1,766	+0.76%
2018	2,463	+1.77%
Source: EHESS and INSEE

== See also ==
- Communes of the Eure department
