= Le Thuit, Eure =

Le Thuit
- Commune
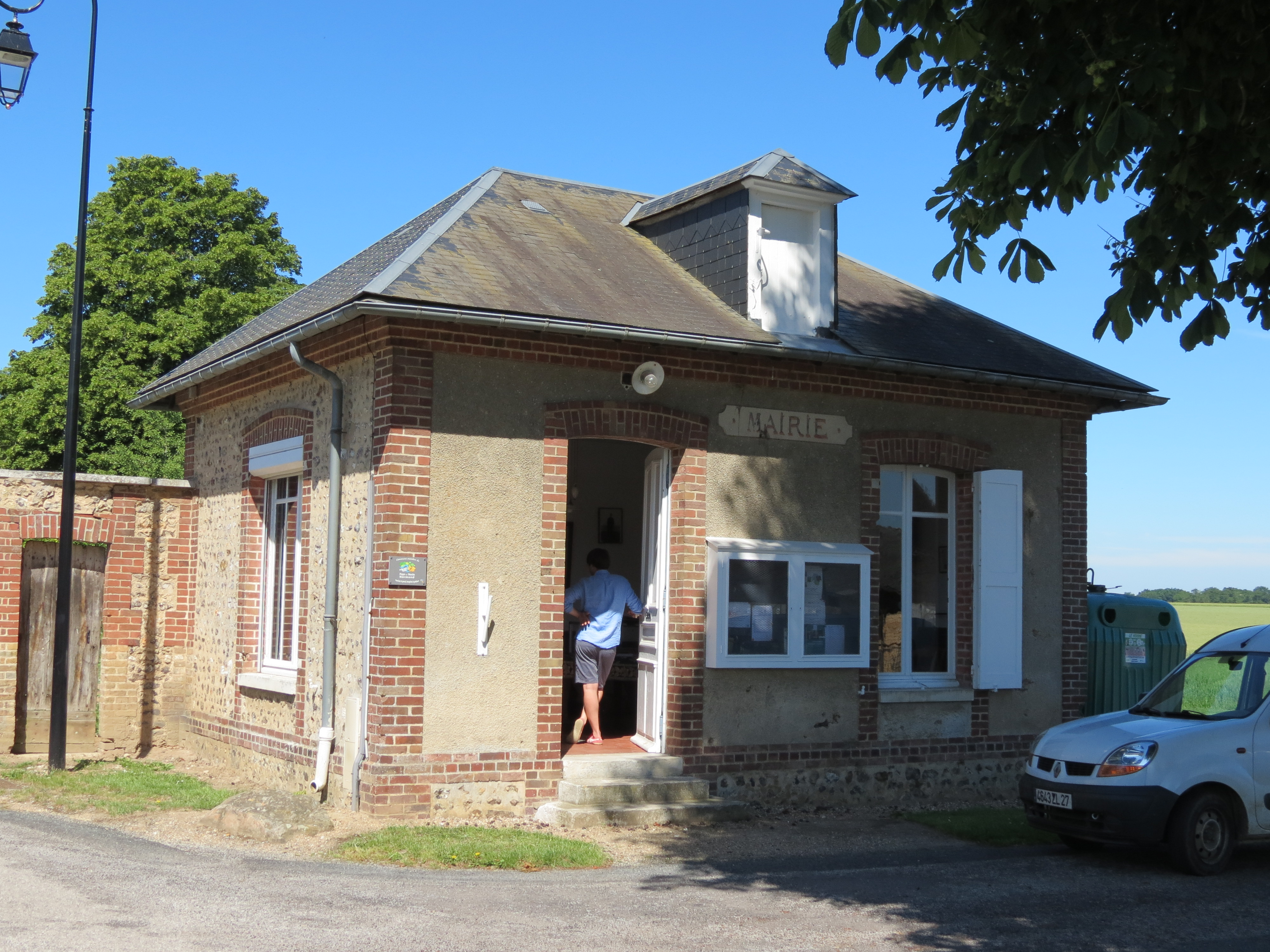
- The town hall in Le Thuit
- Location of Le Thuit
- Location within France Location within Normandy
- Coordinates: 49°15′31″N 1°21′35″E
- Country: France
- Region: Normandy
- Department: Eure
- Arrondissement: Les Andelys
- Canton: Les Andelys
- Intercommunality: Seine Normandie Agglomération

Government
  - Mayor (2020–2026): Jérôme Pluchet
- Area^{1}: 3.02 km^{2} (1.17 sq mi)
- Elevation: 140 m (460 ft)
- Highest elevation: 143 m (469 ft)
- Lowest elevation: 7 m (23 ft)
- Population (2023): 144
  - Density: 47.7/km^{2} (123/sq mi)
- Time zone: UTC+01:00 (CET)
  - Summer (DST): UTC+02:00 (CEST)
- INSEE/Postal code: 27635 /27700
- ^{1} French Land Register data, which excludes lakes, ponds, glaciers > 1 km^{2} (0.386 sq mi or 247 acres) and river estuaries.

Le Thuit (French pronunciation: [lə tɥi]) is a commune in the Eure department and Normandy region of northern France.

== Population ==
Historical population
Year	Pop.	±% p.a.
1968	101	—
1975	91	−1.48%
1982	84	−1.14%
1990	81	−0.45%
1999	101	+2.48%
2007	125	+2.70%
2012	140	+2.29%
2017	141	+0.14%
2023	144	+0.35%
Source: INSEE

== See also ==
- Communes of the Eure department
