= Le Thuit-Anger =

- Part of Le Thuit-de-l'Oison
- Coat of arms
- Location of Le Thuit-Anger
- Location within France Location within Normandy
- Coordinates: 49°16′24″N 0°58′05″E
- Country: France
- Region: Normandy
- Department: Eure
- Arrondissement: Bernay
- Canton: Bourgtheroulde-Infreville
- Commune: Le Thuit-de-l'Oison
- Area^{1}: 3.03 km^{2} (1.17 sq mi)
- Elevation: 140 m (460 ft)
- Highest elevation: 148 m (486 ft)
- Lowest elevation: 113 m (371 ft)
- Population (2018): 721
  - Density: 238/km^{2} (616/sq mi)
- Time zone: UTC+01:00 (CET)
  - Summer (DST): UTC+02:00 (CEST)
- Postal code: 27370
- ^{1} French Land Register data, which excludes lakes, ponds, glaciers > 1 km^{2} (0.386 sq mi or 247 acres) and river estuaries.

Le Thuit-Anger (French pronunciation: [lə tɥi ɑ̃ʒe]) is a former commune in the Eure department in Normandy in northern France. On 1 January 2016, it was merged into the new commune of Le Thuit-de-l'Oison.

== Population ==
Historical population
Year	Pop.	±% p.a.
1962	263	—
1968	305	+2.50%
1975	382	+3.27%
1982	644	+7.75%
1990	645	+0.02%
1999	584	−1.10%
2018	721	+1.12%
Source: EHESS and INSEE

== See also ==
- Communes of the Eure department
