= Le Thuit-Simer =

- Part of Le Thuit-de-l'Oison
- Coat of arms
- Location of Le Thuit-Simer
- Location within France Location within Normandy
- Coordinates: 49°15′55″N 0°54′51″E
- Country: France
- Region: Normandy
- Department: Eure
- Arrondissement: Bernay
- Canton: Bourgtheroulde-Infreville
- Commune: Le Thuit-de-l'Oison
- Area^{1}: 2.74 km^{2} (1.06 sq mi)
- Elevation: 130 m (430 ft)
- Highest elevation: 142 m (466 ft)
- Lowest elevation: 122 m (400 ft)
- Population (2018): 486
  - Density: 177/km^{2} (459/sq mi)
- Time zone: UTC+01:00 (CET)
  - Summer (DST): UTC+02:00 (CEST)
- Postal code: 27370
- ^{1} French Land Register data, which excludes lakes, ponds, glaciers > 1 km^{2} (0.386 sq mi or 247 acres) and river estuaries.

Le Thuit-Simer (French pronunciation: [lə tɥi sime]) is a former commune in the Eure department in Normandy in northern France. On 1 January 2016, it was merged into the new commune of Le Thuit-de-l'Oison.

== See also ==
- Communes of the Eure department
