= Cunt =

Vulgar term

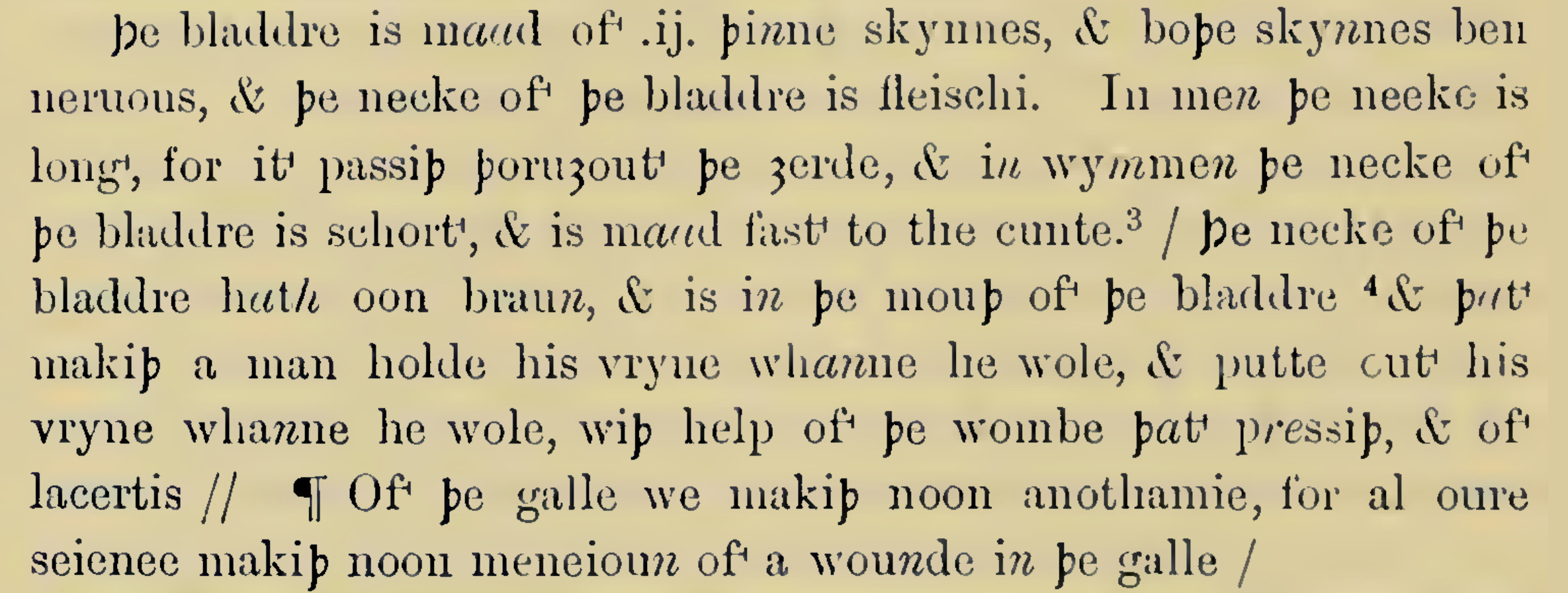
The word "cunt" used in a medical textbook from 1380

Cunt (/kʌnt/) is a contemporary vulgar word for the vulva in its primary sense, and it is used in a variety of ways, including as a term of disparagement. It is often used as a disparaging and obscene term for a woman in the United States, an unpleasant or objectionable person (regardless of gender) in the United Kingdom and Ireland, or a contemptible man in Australia and New Zealand. In Australia, New Zealand and sometimes the United Kingdom, it can also be a neutral or positive term when used with a positive qualifier (e.g., "He's a good cunt"). The term has various derivative senses, including adjective and verb uses.

== History ==
The earliest known use of the word, according to the Oxford English Dictionary, was as part of a placename: an Oxford street called Gropecunt Lane, c. 1230, now by the name of Grove Passage or Magpie Lane. Use of the word as a term of abuse is relatively recent, dating from the late nineteenth century. The word was not considered vulgar in the Middle Ages, but became so during the seventeenth century, and it was omitted from dictionaries from the late eighteenth century until the 1960s.

== Etymology ==
The etymology of cunt is a matter of debate, but most sources consider the word to have derived from a Germanic word (Proto-Germanic *kuntō, stem *kuntōn-), which appeared as kunta in Old Norse. Scholars are uncertain of the origin of the Proto-Germanic form itself. There are cognates in most Germanic languages, most of which also have the same meaning as the English cunt, such as the Swedish, Faroese and Nynorsk kunta; West Frisian and Middle Low German kunte; another Middle Low German kutte; Middle High German kotze (meaning "prostitute"); modern German kott; Middle Dutch conte; modern Dutch words kut (same meaning) and kont ("butt", "arse"); and perhaps Old English cot.

The etymology of the Proto-Germanic term is disputed. It may have arisen by Grimm's law operating on the Proto-Indo-European root *gen/gon "create, become" seen in gonads, genital, gamete, genetics, gene, or the Proto-Indo-European root *gʷneh₂/guneh₂ "woman" (Greek: gunê, seen in gynaecology). Similarly, its use in England likely evolved from the Latin word cunnus ("vulva"), or one of its derivatives French con, Spanish coño, and Galician/Portuguese cona. Other Latin words related to cunnus are cuneus ("wedge") and its derivative cunēre ("to fasten with a wedge", (figurative) "to squeeze in"), leading to English words such as cuneiform ("wedge-shaped"). In Middle English, cunt appeared with many spellings, such as coynte, cunte and queynte, which did not always reflect the actual pronunciation of the word.

The word, in its modern meaning, is attested in Middle English. Proverbs of Hendyng, a manuscript from some time before 1325, includes the advice:

Ȝeue þi cunte to cunnig and craue affetir wedding.

In modern spelling: Give thy cunt to cunning and crave after wedding.

(Give your cunt wisely and make [your] demands after the wedding.)

== Offensiveness ==
=== Generally ===
The word cunt is generally regarded in English-speaking countries as profanity and unsuitable for normal public discourse. It has been described as "the most heavily tabooed word of all English words", although John Ayto, editor of the Oxford Dictionary of Slang, says "nigger" is more taboo.

=== Feminist perspectives ===
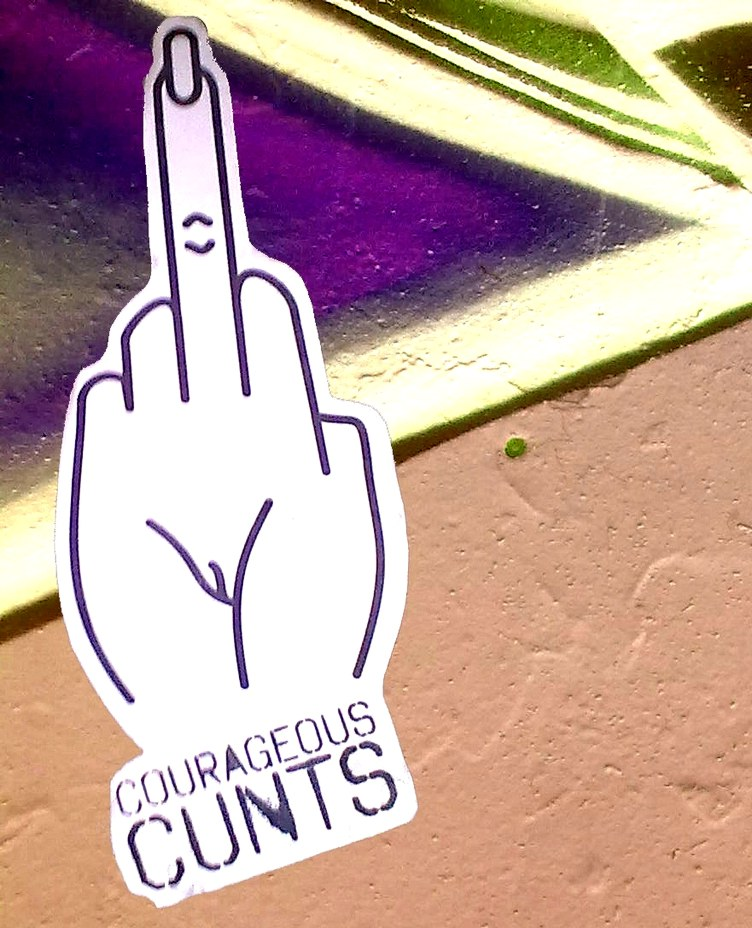
Flyposting of the activist platform Courageous Cunts on an urban wall

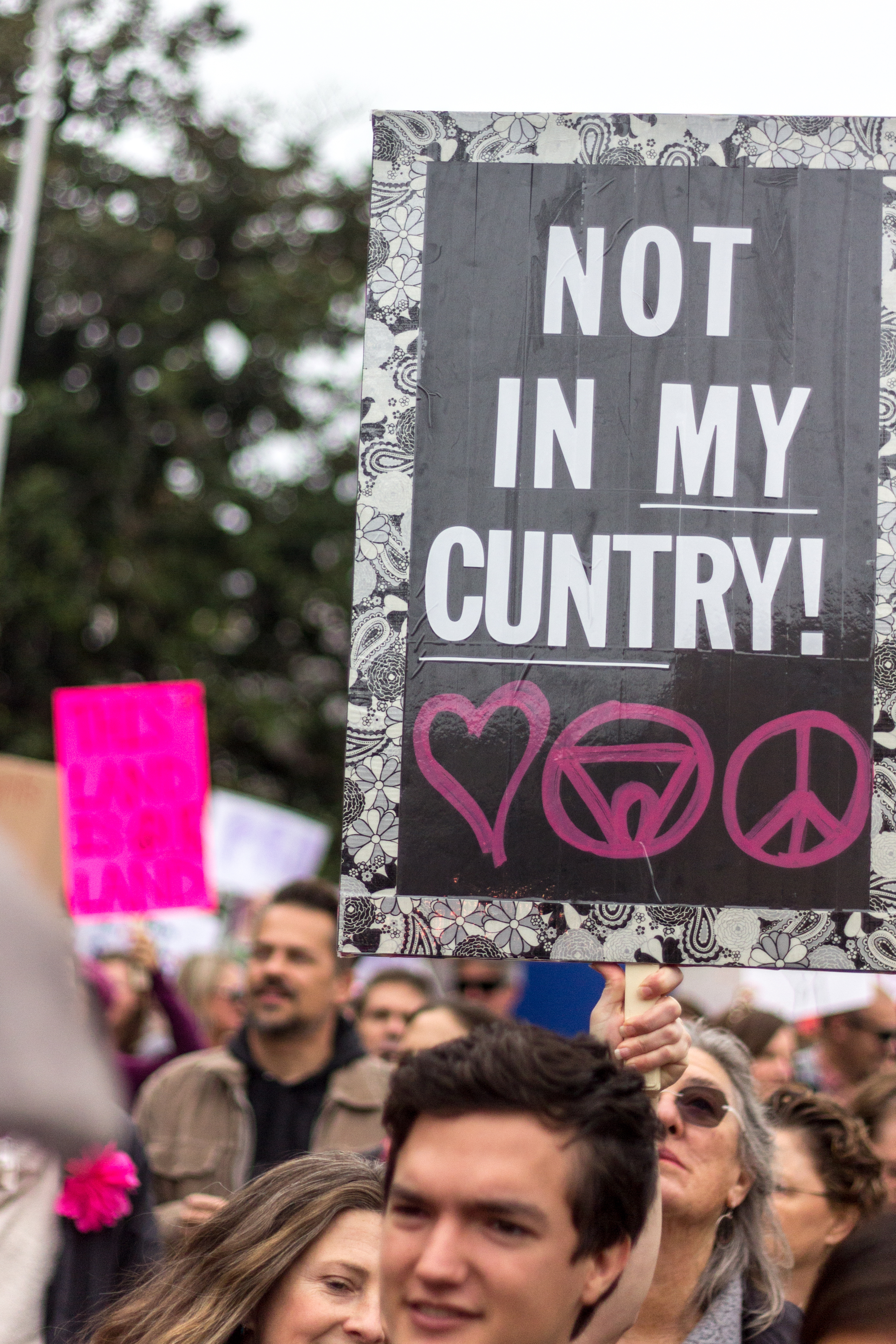
Santa Cruz Women's March 2017

Some American feminists of the 1970s sought to eliminate disparaging terms for women, including "bitch" and "cunt". In the context of pornography, Catharine MacKinnon argued that use of the word acts to reinforce a dehumanisation of women by reducing them to mere body parts; and in 1979 Andrea Dworkin described the word as reducing women to "the one essential – 'cunt: our essence ... our offence'".

Despite criticisms, there is a movement among feminists that seeks to reclaim cunt not only as acceptable, but as an honorific, in much the same way that queer has been reappropriated by LGBT people and nigger has been by some African Americans. Proponents include artist Tee Corinne in The Cunt Coloring Book (1975); Eve Ensler in "Reclaiming Cunt" from The Vagina Monologues (1996); and Inga Muscio in her book, Cunt: A Declaration of Independence (1998).

Germaine Greer, the feminist writer and professor of English who once published a magazine article entitled "Lady, Love Your Cunt" (anthologised in 1986), discussed the origins, usage and power of the word in the BBC series Balderdash and Piffle, explaining how her views had developed over time. In the 1970s she had "championed" the use of the word for the female genitalia, thinking it "shouldn't be abusive"; she rejected the "proper" word vagina, a Latin name meaning "sword-sheath" originally applied by male anatomists to all muscle coverings (see synovial sheath) – not just because it refers only to the internal canal but also because of the implication that the female body is "simply a receptacle for a weapon". But in 2006, referring to its use as a term of abuse, she said that, though used in some quarters as a term of affection, it had become "the most offensive insult one man could throw at another" and suggested that the word was "sacred", and "a word of immense power, to be used sparingly". Greer said in 2006 that "'cunt' is one of the few remaining words in the English language with a genuine power to shock."

== Usage: pre-twentieth century ==
Cunt has been attested in its anatomical meaning since at least the 13th century. While Francis Grose's 1785 A Classical Dictionary of The Vulgar Tongue listed the word as "C**T: a nasty name for a nasty thing", it did not appear in any major English dictionary from 1795 to 1961, when it was included in Webster's Third New International Dictionary with the comment "usu. considered obscene". Its first appearance in the Oxford English Dictionary was in 1972, which cites the word as having been in use from 1230 in what was supposedly a London street name of "Gropecunte Lane". It was, however, also used before 1230, having been brought over by the Anglo-Saxons, originally not an obscenity but rather an ordinary name for the vulva or vagina. Gropecunt Lane was originally a street of prostitution, a red light district. It was normal in the Middle Ages for streets to be named after the goods available for sale therein, hence the prevalence in cities having a medieval history of names such as "Silver Street" and "Fish Street". In some locations, the former name has been bowdlerised, as in the City of York, to the more acceptable "Grape Lane".

The somewhat similar word 'queynte' appears several times in Chaucer's Canterbury Tales (c. 1390), in bawdy contexts, but since it is used openly, does not appear to have been considered obscene at that time. A notable use is from the "Miller's Tale": "Pryvely he caught her by the queynte." The Wife of Bath also uses this term, "For certeyn, olde dotard, by your leave/You shall have queynte right enough at eve .... What aileth you to grouche thus and groan?/Is it for ye would have my queynte alone?" In modernised versions of these passages the word "queynte" is usually translated simply as "cunt". However, in Chaucer's usage there seems to be an overlap between the words "cunt" and "quaint" (possibly derived from the Latin for "known"). "Quaint" was probably pronounced in Middle English in much the same way as "cunt". It is sometimes unclear whether the two words were thought of as distinct from one another. Elsewhere in Chaucer's work the word queynte seems to be used with meaning comparable to the modern "quaint" (curious or old-fashioned, but nevertheless appealing). This ambiguity was still being exploited by the 17th century; Andrew Marvell's ... then worms shall try / That long preserved virginity, / And your quaint honour turn to dust, / And into ashes all my lust in To His Coy Mistress depends on a pun on these two senses of "quaint".

By Shakespeare's day, the word seems to have become obscene. Although Shakespeare does not use the word explicitly (or with derogatory meaning) in his plays, he still uses wordplay to sneak it in obliquely. In Act III, Scene 2, of Hamlet, as the castle's residents are settling in to watch the play-within-the-play, Hamlet asks his girlfriend Ophelia, "Lady, shall I lie in your lap?" Ophelia replies, "No, my lord." Hamlet, feigning shock, says, "Do you think I meant country matters?" Then, to drive home the point that the accent is definitely on the first syllable of country, Shakespeare has Hamlet say, "That's a fair thought, to lie between maids' legs." In Twelfth Night (Act II, Scene V) the puritanical Malvolio believes he recognises his employer's handwriting in an anonymous letter, commenting "There be her very Cs, her Us, and her Ts: and thus makes she her great Ps", unwittingly punning on "cunt" and "piss", and while it has also been argued that the slang term "cut" is intended, Pauline Kiernan writes that Shakespeare ridicules "prissy puritanical party-poopers" by having "a Puritan spell out the word 'cunt' on a public stage". A related scene occurs in Henry V: when Katherine is learning English, she is appalled at the gros, et impudique words "foot" and "gown", which her teacher has mispronounced as coun. It is usually argued that Shakespeare intends to suggest that she has misheard "foot" as foutre (French, "fuck") and "coun" as con (French "cunt", also used to mean "idiot").

Similarly, John Donne alludes to the obscene meaning of the word without being explicit in his poem The Good-Morrow, referring to sucking on "country pleasures". The 1675 Restoration comedy The Country Wife also features such word play, even in its title.

By the 17th century, a softer form of the word, "cunny", came into use. A well-known use of this derivation can be found in the 25 October 1668 entry of the diary of Samuel Pepys. He was discovered having an affair with Deborah Willet: he wrote that his wife "coming up suddenly, did find me embracing the girl con [with] my hand sub [under] su [her] coats; and endeed I was with my main [hand] in her cunny. I was at a wonderful loss upon it and the girl also ...."

Cunny was probably derived from a pun on coney, meaning "rabbit", rather as pussy is connected to the same term for a cat. (Philip Massinger (1583–1640): "A pox upon your Christian cockatrices! They cry, like poulterers' wives, 'No money, no coney.'") Because of this slang use as a synonym for a taboo term, the word "coney", when it was used in its original sense to refer to rabbits, came to be pronounced as /ˈkoʊni/ (rhymes with "phoney"), instead of the original /ˈkʌni/ (rhymes with "honey"). Eventually, the taboo association led to the word "coney" becoming deprecated entirely and replaced by the word "rabbit".

Robert Burns (1759–1796) used the word in his Merry Muses of Caledonia, a collection of bawdy verses which he kept to himself and were not publicly available until the mid-1960s. In "Yon, Yon, Yon, Lassie", this couplet appears: "For ilka birss upon her cunt, Was worth a ryal ransom" ("For every hair upon her cunt was worth a royal ransom").

== Usage: modern ==
=== General ===
==== As a term of abuse ====
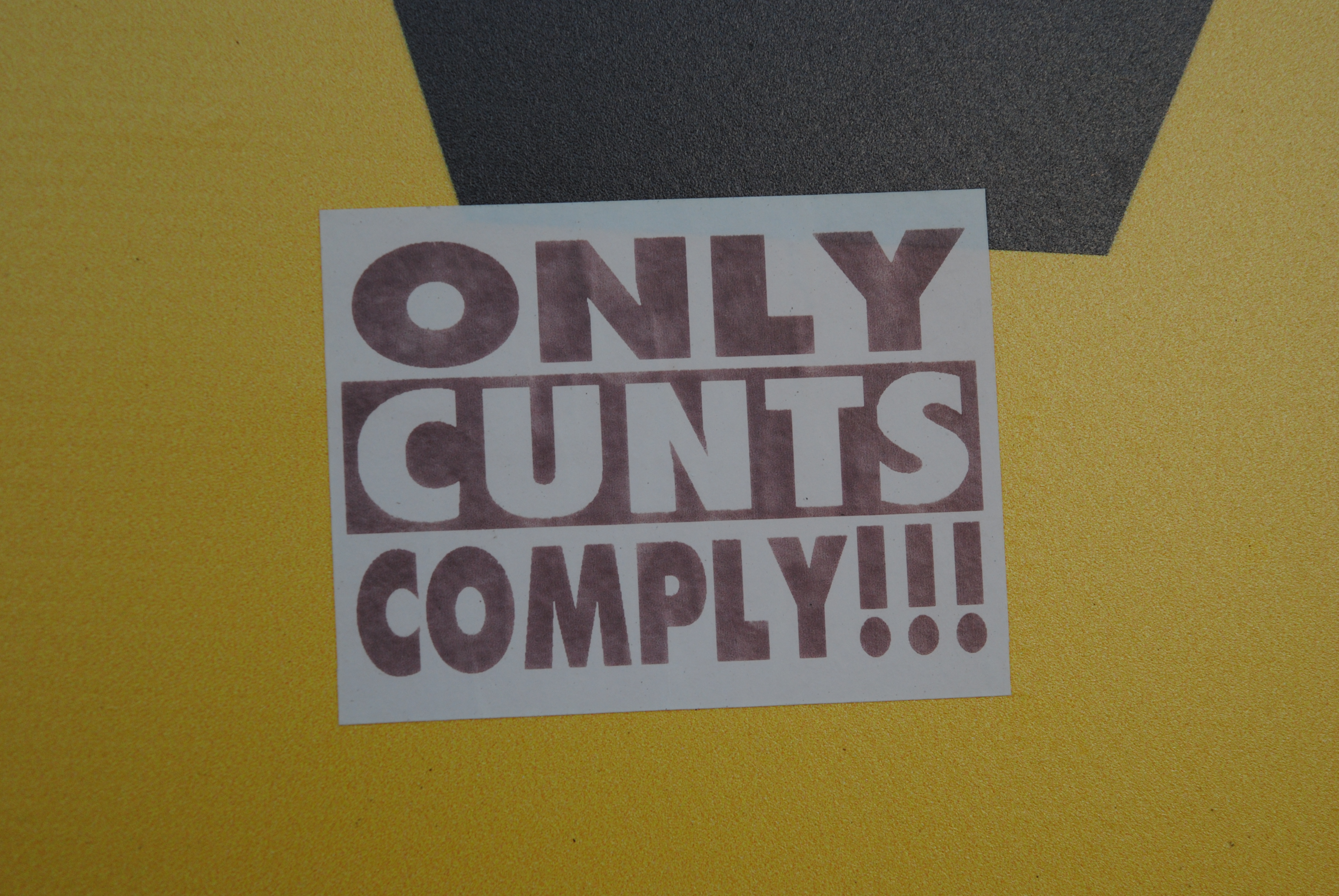
"Only cunts comply!!!" – one of a series of anti-COVID-19 vaccination stickers fly-pasted onto a signboard advertising the availability of vaccines, at a health centre in Birmingham, England, during the COVID-19 pandemic

Merriam-Webster states it is a "usually disparaging and obscene" term for a woman, and that it is an "offensive way to refer to a woman" in the United States. In American slang, the term can also be used to refer to "a fellow male homosexual one dislikes". Australian scholar Emma Alice Jane describes how the term as used on modern social media is an example of what she calls "gendered vitriol", and an example of misogynistic e-bile. As a broader derogatory term, it is comparable to prick and means "a fool, a dolt, an unpleasant person – of either sex". This sense is common in New Zealand, British, and Australian English, where it is usually applied to men or as referring specifically to "a despicable, contemptible or foolish" man.

During the 1971 Oz trial for obscenity, prosecuting counsel asked writer George Melly, "Would you call your 10-year-old daughter a cunt?" Melly replied, "No, because I don't think she is."

==== Other usage ====
In informal British, Irish, New Zealand, and Australian English, and occasionally but to a lesser extent in Canadian English, it can be used with no negative connotations to refer to a (usually male) person. In this sense, it may be modified by a positive qualifier (funny, clever, etc.). For example, "This is my mate Brian. He's a good cunt." In Welsh, cont (the Welsh equivalent) is sometimes used as a term of endearment, such as the phrase iawn cont (lit. 'okay cunt') in Caernarfon.

It can also be used to refer to something very difficult or unpleasant (as in "a cunt of a job").

In the Survey of English Dialects the word was recorded in some areas as meaning "the vulva of a cow". This was pronounced as [kʌnt] in Devon, and [kʊnt] in the Isle of Man, Gloucestershire and Northumberland. Possibly related was the word cunny [kʌni], with the same meaning, in Wiltshire.

The word "cunty" is also known, although used rarely: a line from Hanif Kureishi's My Beautiful Laundrette is the definition of England by a Pakistani immigrant as "eating hot buttered toast with cunty fingers", suggestive of hypocrisy and a hidden sordidness or immorality behind the country's quaint façade. This term is attributed to British novelist Henry Green. In the United States, "cunty" is sometimes used in cross-dressing drag ball culture for a drag queen that "projects feminine beauty" and was the title of a hit song by Aviance. A visitor to a New York drag show tells of the emcee praising a queen with "cunty, cunty, cunty" as she walks past.

In the 2020s, the phrase "serving cunt" (or to "serve cunt") became popular as a term for acting in a powerfully and unapologetically feminine manner.

==== Frequency of use ====
Frequency of use varies widely. According to research in 2013 and 2014 by Aston University and the University of South Carolina, based on a corpus of nearly 9 billion words in geotagged tweets, the word was most frequently used in the United States in New England and was least frequently used in the south-eastern states. In Maine, it was the most frequently used "cuss word" after "asshole".

=== Examples ===
==== Literature ====
James Joyce was one of the first major 20th-century novelists to put the word "cunt" into print. In the context of one of the central characters in Ulysses (1922), Leopold Bloom, Joyce refers to the Dead Sea and to

... the oldest people. Wandered far away over all the earth, captivity to captivity, multiplying, dying, being born everywhere. It lay there now. Now it could bear no more. Dead: an old woman's: the grey sunken cunt of the world.

Joyce uses the word figuratively rather than literally; but while Joyce used the word only once in Ulysses, with four other wordplays ('cunty') on it, D. H. Lawrence later used the word ten times in Lady Chatterley's Lover (1928), in a more direct sense. Mellors, the gamekeeper and eponymous lover, tries delicately to explain the definition of the word to Lady Constance Chatterley: "If your sister there comes ter me for a bit o' cunt an' tenderness, she knows what she's after." The novel was the subject of an unsuccessful UK prosecution in 1961 against its publishers, Penguin Books, on grounds of obscenity.

Samuel Beckett was an associate of Joyce, and in his Malone Dies (1956), he writes: "His young wife had abandoned all hope of bringing him to heel, by means of her cunt, that trump card of young wives." In 1998, Inga Muscio published Cunt: A Declaration of Independence. In Ian McEwan's novel Atonement (2001), set in 1935, the word is used in the draft of a love letter mistakenly sent instead of a revised version and, although not spoken, is an important plot pivot.

Irvine Welsh uses the word widely in his novels, such as Trainspotting, generally as a generic placeholder for a man, and not always negatively, e.g. "Ah wis the cunt wi the fuckin pool cue in ma hand, n the plukey cunt could huv the fat end ay it in his pus if he wanted, like."

==== Art ====
The word is occasionally used in the titles of works of art, such as Peter Renosa's portrait of the pop singer Madonna, I am the Cunt of Western Civilization, from a 1990 quote by the singer. One of the first works of Gilbert & George was a self-portrait in 1969 entitled "Gilbert the Shit and George the Cunt". The London performance art group the Neo Naturists had a song and an act called "Cunt Power", a name which potter Grayson Perry borrowed for one of his early works: "An unglazed piece of modest dimensions, made from terracotta like clay – labia carefully formed with once wet material, about its midriff". Australian artist Greg Taylor's display of scores of white porcelain vulvas, "CUNTS and other conversations" (2009), was deemed controversial for both its title and content, with Australia Post warning the artist that the publicity postcards were illegal.

==== Theatre ====
Theatre censorship was effectively abolished in the UK in 1968; prior to that, all theatrical productions had to be vetted by Lord Chamberlain's Office. English stand-up comedian Roy "Chubby" Brown claims that he was the first person to say the word on stage in the United Kingdom.

==== Television ====
===== United Kingdom =====
Broadcast media is regulated for content, and media providers such as the BBC have guidelines which specify how "cunt" and similar words should be treated. In a survey of 2000 commissioned by the British Broadcasting Standards Commission, Independent Television Commission, BBC and Advertising Standards Authority, "cunt" was regarded as the most offensive word which could be heard, above "motherfucker" and "fuck". Nevertheless, there have been occasions when, particularly in a live broadcast, the word has been aired outside editorial control:

- The Frost Programme, broadcast 7 November 1970, was the first time the word was known to have been used on British television, in an aside by Felix Dennis. This incident has since been reshown many times.
- Bernard Manning first said on television the line "They say you are what you eat. I'm a cunt."
- This Morning broadcast the word in 2000, used by model Caprice Bourret while being interviewed live about her role in The Vagina Monologues.

The first scripted uses of the word on British television occurred in 1979, in the ITV drama No Mama No. In Jerry Springer – The Opera (BBC, 2005), the suggestion that the Christ character might be gay proved to be more controversial than the chant describing the Devil as a "cunting, cunting, cunting, cunting cunt". In 2016, the BBC announced that there was "strong editorial justification" for airing especially profane dialogue from a 1978 Derek and Clive sketch in the BBC Four documentary The Undiscovered Peter Cook; containing 12 uses of "cunt" and 15 uses of "fuck" over its 70-second duration, the clip was named "almost certainly" the "most profanity riddled rant ever broadcast on British TV" by the Radio Times, and its broadcast was only allowed after BBC head of television Charlotte Moore gave her clear approval.

In July 2007 BBC Three broadcast an hour-long documentary, entitled The 'C' Word, about the origins, use and evolution of the word from the early 1900s to the present day. Presented by British comedian Will Smith, viewers were taken to a street in Oxford once called Gropecunt Lane and presented with examples of the acceptability of "cunt" as a word. (Note that "the C-word" is also a long-standing euphemism for cancer; Lisa Lynch's book led to a BBC1 drama, both with that title.)

The Attitudes to potentially offensive language and gestures on TV and radio report by Ofcom, based on research conducted by Ipsos MORI, categorised the usage of the word 'cunt' as a highly unacceptable pre-watershed, but generally acceptable post-watershed, along with 'fuck' and 'motherfucker'. Discriminatory words were generally considered as more offensive than the most offensive non-discriminatory words such as 'cunt' by the UK public, with discriminatory words being more regulated as a result.

===== United States =====
The first scripted use on US television was on the Larry Sanders Show in 1992, and a notable use occurred in Sex and the City. An episode of the NBC TV show 30 Rock, titled "The C Word", centered around a subordinate calling protagonist Liz Lemon (Tina Fey) a "cunt" and her subsequent efforts to regain her staff's favour. Characters in the popular TV series The Sopranos often used the term. Jane Fonda uttered the word on a live airing of the Today Show, a network broadcast-TV news program, in 2008 when being interviewed by co-host Meredith Vieira about The Vagina Monologues. Coincidentally, nearly two years later in 2010, also on the Today Show, Vieira interviewed a thirteen-year-old girl who said the word twice to describe the contents of text messages she was privy to, that were central to a well publicised and violent assault. Meredith gently cautioned the girl to choose her words more carefully. As this was a live broadcast on the East Coast, the utterances were already broadcast, but the producers removed the audio for the Central, Mountain, and Pacific feeds as well as online. Like the Fonda incident, Vieira issued an apology later in the show. Media Critic Thomas Francis commented on what he perceived to be hypocrisy in the media industry:

Isn't it interesting how the national media licks its chops over this story, delighting in every gory detail, only to caution a 13-year-old girl to be "careful about our language"?

Why should she be careful, Meredith? Because there are 13-year-old girls in the audience? There's so much violence and vulgarity in modern American culture, words like cunt are like so many deck chairs on the Titanic.

==== Radio ====
On 6 December 2010, on the BBC Radio 4 Today programme, presenter James Naughtie referred to the British Culture Secretary Jeremy Hunt as "Jeremy Cunt"; he later apologised for what the BBC called the inadvertent use of "an offensive four-letter word". In the programme following, about an hour later, Andrew Marr referred to the incident during Start the Week where it was said that "we won't repeat the mistake" whereupon Marr slipped up in the same way as Naughtie had.

==== Film ====
The word's first appearance was in graffiti on a wall in the 1969 film Bronco Bullfrog. The first spoken use of the word in mainstream cinema occurs in The Boys in the Band (1970) where it is used four times, including the insults "real card-carrying cunt," "truly super-cunt," and "çunt — that's French with a cedilla." The next year, it appeared in Carnal Knowledge (1971), in which Jonathan (Jack Nicholson) asks, "Is this an ultimatum? Answer me, you ball-busting, castrating, son of a cunt bitch! Is this an ultimatum or not?" In the same year, the word was used in the film Women in Revolt, in which Holly Woodlawn shouts "I love cunt" whilst avoiding a violent boyfriend. Nicholson later used it again, in One Flew Over the Cuckoo's Nest (1975). Two early films by Martin Scorsese, Mean Streets (1973) and Taxi Driver (1976), use the word in the context of the virgin-whore dichotomy, with characters using it after they were rejected (in Mean Streets) or after they have had sex with the woman (in Taxi Driver).

In notable instances, the word has been edited out. Saturday Night Fever (1977) was released in two versions, "R" (Restricted) and "PG" (Parental Guidance), the latter omitting or replacing dialogue such as Tony Manero's (John Travolta) comment to Annette (Donna Pescow), "It's a decision a girl's gotta make early in life, if she's gonna be a nice girl or a cunt". This differential persists, and in The Silence of the Lambs (1991), Agent Starling (Jodie Foster) meets Dr. Hannibal Lecter (Anthony Hopkins) for the first time and passes the cell of "Multiple Miggs", who says to Starling: "I can smell your cunt." In versions of the film edited for television the word is dubbed with the word scent. The 2010 film Kick-Ass caused a controversy when the word was used by Hit-Girl because the actress playing the part, Chloë Grace Moretz, was 11 years old at the time of filming.

In Britain, use of the word "cunt" may result in an "18" rating from the British Board of Film Classification (BBFC), and this happened to Ken Loach's film Sweet Sixteen, because of an estimated twenty uses of "cunt". Still, the BBFC's guidelines at "15" state that "very strong language may be permitted, depending on the manner in which it is used, who is using the language, its frequency within the work as a whole and any special contextual justification". Also directed by Loach, My Name is Joe was given a 15 certificate despite more than one instance of the word. The 2010 Ian Dury biopic Sex & Drugs & Rock & Roll was given a "15" rating despite containing seven uses of the word. The BBFC have also allowed it at the "12" level, in the case of well known works such as Hamlet.

==== Comedy ====
In their Derek and Clive dialogues, Peter Cook and Dudley Moore, particularly Cook, used the word in the 1976 sketch "This Bloke Came Up To Me", with "cunt" used 35 times. The word is also used extensively by British comedian Roy 'Chubby' Brown, which ensures that his stand-up act has never been fully shown on UK television.

Australian stand-up comedian Rodney Rude frequently refers to his audiences as "cunts" and makes frequent use of the word in his acts, which got him arrested in Queensland and Western Australia for breaching obscenity laws of those states in the mid-1980s. Australian comedic singer Kevin Bloody Wilson makes extensive use of the word, most notably in the songs Caring Understanding Nineties Type and You Can't Say "Cunt" in Canada.

The word appears in American comic George Carlin's 1972 standup routine on the list of the seven dirty words that could not, at that time, be said on American broadcast television, a routine that led to a U.S. Supreme Court decision. While some of the original seven are now heard on US broadcast television from time to time, "cunt" remains generally taboo except on premium paid subscription cable channels such as HBO or Showtime. Comedian Louis C.K. uses the term frequently in his stage act as well as on his television show Louie on FX network, which bleeps it out.

In 2018, Canadian comedian Samantha Bee had to apologise after calling Ivanka Trump a "feckless cunt" on American late night TV show Full Frontal with Samantha Bee.

==== Music ====
The 1977 Ian Dury and The Blockheads album, New Boots and Panties, used the word in the opening line of the track "Plaistow Patricia", thus: "Arseholes, bastards, fucking cunts and pricks", particularly notable as there is no musical lead-in to the lyrics.

In 1979, during a concert at New York's Bottom Line, Carlene Carter introduced a song about mate-swapping called "Swap-Meat Rag" by stating, "If this song doesn't put the cunt back in country, nothing will." However use of the word in lyrics is not recorded before Sid Vicious's 1978 version of "My Way", which marked the first known use of the word in a UK top 10 hit, as a line was changed to "You cunt/I'm not a queer". The following year, "cunt" was used more explicitly in the song "Why D'Ya Do It?" from Marianne Faithfull's album Broken English:

Why'd ya do it, she screamed, after all we've said,
Every time I see your dick I see her cunt in my bed.

Earlier, in 1972, the Rolling Stones' "Casino Boogie" (on Exile on Main St.) contains the lyric "Kissing cunt in Cannes", sung by Mick Jagger. Its use of "cunt" initially went generally unremarked on. The author Gina Arnold believes this is because "probably hardly anyone understood it", given Jagger's garbled syntax when delivering the line.

The Happy Mondays song, "Kuff Dam" (i.e. "Mad fuck" in reverse), from their 1987 debut album, Squirrel and G-Man Twenty Four Hour Party People Plastic Face Carnt Smile (White Out), includes the lyrics "You see that Jesus is a cunt / And never helped you with a thing that you do, or you don't". Biblical scholar James Crossley, writing in the academic journal, Biblical Interpretation, analyses the Happy Mondays' reference to "Jesus is a cunt" as a description of the "useless assistance" of a now "inadequate Jesus". A phrase from the same lyric, "Jesus is a cunt" was included on the notorious Cradle of Filth T-shirt which depicted a masturbating nun on the front and the slogan "Jesus is a cunt" in large letters on the back. The T-shirt was banned in New Zealand, in 2008.

Rapper Azealia Banks is known for her frequent usage of the word, and her fans are known as the Kunt Brigade. She said in one interview:

"To be cunty is to be feminine and to be, like, aware of yourself. Nobody's fucking with that inner strength and delicateness. The cunts, the gay men, adore that. My friends would say, "Oh you need to cunt it up! You're being too banjee."

The Australian band TISM released an extended play in 1993 titled Australia the Lucky Cunt (a reference to Australia's label the "lucky country"). They also released a single in 1998 entitled "I Might Be a Cunt, but I'm Not a Fucking Cunt", which was banned. The American grindcore band Anal Cunt, on being signed to a bigger label, shortened their name to AxCx.

== Linguistic variants and derivatives ==
Various euphemisms, minced forms and in-jokes are used to imply the word without actually saying it, thereby escaping obvious censure and censorship.

=== Spoonerisms ===
Deriving from a dirty joke: "What's the difference between a circus and a strip club?"- "The circus has a bunch of cunning stunts...". The phrase cunning stunt has been used in popular music. Its first documented appearance was by the English band Caravan, who released the album Cunning Stunts in July 1975; the title was later used by Metallica for a CD/Video compilation, and in 1992 the Cows released an album with the same title. In his 1980s BBC television programme, Kenny Everett played a vapid starlet, Cupid Stunt.

=== Acronyms ===
There are numerous informal acronyms, including various apocryphal stories concerning academic establishments, such as the Cambridge University National Trust Society.

=== Puns ===
The name "Mike Hunt" is a frequent pun on my cunt; it has been used in a scene from the movie Porky's, and for a character in the BBC radio comedy Radio Active in the 1980s. "Has Anyone Seen Mike Hunt?" were the words written on a "pink neon sculpture" representing the letter C, in a 2004 exhibition of the alphabet at the British Library in collaboration with the International Society of Typographic Designers.

As well as obvious references, there are also allusions. On I'm Sorry I Haven't a Clue, Stephen Fry once defined countryside as the act of "murdering Piers Morgan".

=== Derived meanings ===
The word "cunt" forms part of some technical terms used in seafaring and other industries.

- In nautical usage, a cunt splice is a type of rope splice used to join two lines in the rigging of ships. Its name has been bowdlerised since at least 1861, and in more recent times it is commonly referred to as a "cut splice".
- The Dictionary of Sea Terms, found within Dana's 1841 maritime compendium The Seaman's Friend, defines the word cuntline as "the space between the bilges of two casks, stowed side by side. Where one cask is set upon the cuntline between two others, they are stowed bilge and cuntline." The "bilge" of a barrel or cask is the widest point, so when stored together the two casks would produce a curved V-shaped gap. The glossary of The Ashley Book of Knots by Clifford Ashley, first published in 1944, defines cuntlines as "the surface seams between the strands of a rope." Though referring to a different object from Dana's definition, it similarly describes the crease formed by two abutting cylinders.
- In US military usage personnel refer privately to a common uniform item, a flat, soft cover (hat) with a fold along the top resembling an invagination, as a cunt cap. The proper name for the item is garrison cap or overseas cap, depending on the organisation in which it is worn.
- Cunt hair (sometimes as red cunt hair) has been used since the late 1950s to signify a very small distance.
- Cunt-eyed has been used to refer to a person with narrow, squinting eyes.

== See also ==
- Scunthorpe problem
- Seven dirty words
- Sexual slang
- Terminology of transgender anatomy, including several meanings of cunt
- Twat, a vulgar word with a similar meaning and use cases
