= Rose: Love in Violent Times =

2010 book on violence by Inga Muscio

- Author: Inga Muscio
- Language: English
- Genre: Popular science
- Published: 2010 Seven Stories Press

Rose is the 2010 book by Inga Muscio which looks into the passive and physical violence in our daily lives and describes how we might find love within this violence. It is her third book, following Cunt: A Declaration of Independence (1998) and Autobiography of a Blue-Eyed Devil: My Life and Times in a Racist, Imperialist Society (2005). Rose is divided into three main sections: an Introduction, Part I—Violence, and Part II—Love.

Muscio was inspired to write on the subject of violence based on a quote she heard from Arun Gandhi: “Acts of passive violence generate anger in the victim, and...it is passive violence that fuels the fire of physical violence...If we wish to put out the fire of physical violence we have to cut off the fuel supply."

Muscio stated that it was this quote that was the inspiration for this book and that this quote changed the way she viewed her relationships and the world, itself.

Cover: On the front cover of the book there is a picture of a rose with 101 words forming a ‘spiral’ shape. Muscio insists that these words must be defined by the readers for themselves. She explains the process of narrowing down the list of words in Chapter 5: Definitions within Part II of Rose. These words are (in order):

dream, death, destruction, delirium, desire, despair, destiny, lie, cheat, steal, hate, normal, work, abandon, home, dirty, alien, creation, genius, ugly, violate, nothing, blessed, beautiful, heart, news, knowledge, will, prison, refugee, crime, pathogen, entertainment, space, racism, ritual, healer, holocaust, behavior, terrorist, poor, wrong, discover, virginity, god, own, love, war, museum, disability, cute, execute, vitamin, sex, commodity, trash, good, community, genocide, exploited, safe, whore, innocence, wealth, punishment, value, solitude, power, memory, evolution, damage, ghetto, reality, goodwill, industry, traditional, moral, freedom, prayer, silence, map, courage, miracle, violence, ancestor, occupy, chosen, fact, souvenir, tape, isolation, weapon, paradise, drug, reservation, hot, justice, delicacy, family, empire, izzat.

== Expanded Overview ==
=== Introduction ===
Within the introduction section, Muscio lays out the purpose of this book, which is to ultimately help us to learn how to truly love. She claims that by looking into, and truly understanding, the effects of passive and physical violence in our lives we will be open and capable to loving. She criticizes the definitions of violence and love found in dictionaries because those terms are “ positively endless and cannot be defined in two short sentences”. (24) Muscio states that “if we learn about violence and we learn how to love, the possibilities are endless”. (32)

=== Part I—Violence ===
Within this section, Muscio focuses on violence of war, violence of entitlement, safety, and the violence of rape. She uses this section to speak of the types of violence we tend to be ignorant of.

Chapter 1: Violence of War: War, Muscio claims, is a constant “cycle of violence” (43) and “is not easily contained” (45) She compares the history of involvement of war of the United States and of Canada to conclude that, within the United States, war is responsible for the validation of violence in our everyday lives. (46)

Chapter 2: Violence of Entitlement: Muscio also addresses ‘entitlement’ and the way our sense of claim has caused violence throughout history. Within this section she addresses the United States sense of entitlement over the Native Americans and slaves, and how our denial about these cases is hindering our abilities to grow as humans. She also addresses celebrity, the entitlement we give them, and the entitlement they take for themselves as “important people”. She states “How prideful and egotistical we are to think we can change the world without changing ourselves and looking at our indoctrination and really understanding where we come from and who we, as a people, are.” (103)

Chapter 3: Safety: Muscio discusses sexual abuse and, specifically, the trauma that her wife went through growing up. “Recovery” from this type of trauma, the author says, is an inaccurate term because it “makes people think things have gone back to normal” (120)

Chapter 4: Violence of Rape: The author argues that child abuse, like war and entitlement, is a legacy of our culturally history. She focuses mainly on ‘ childhood terrorization’, specifically the scandals of abuse of Priests within the Catholic Church. She argues that “only with therapy, support, and love do people recover from this kind of childhood terrorization.” (141)

=== Part II—Love ===
Chapter 5: Dictionaries: Muscio begins this section by explaining her love/hate relationship with dictionaries. She argues that we must take words such as ‘love’ and ‘war’ and “define them in your life, from your experience, while taking in as many perspectives as possible”. 165. Muscio believes words to be the ultimate weapon of passive violence and calls our attention to the importance of interpreting definitions for ourselves because “words are never stagnant” (167)

Chapter 6: You Are Here: She continues by acknowledging the importance of being present within the universe and that we as humans need to discover our place in the world. She notes the importance religion plays for most people when they try and understand their place, but she stresses the lack of influence religion had on her growing up. She continues by acknowledging that our reliance on technology is the reason for our struggles in being present within the world. “My loneliness resides in the world man has made.” (198)

Chapter 7: Defending the Home Front: In the next section within ‘Part II: Love’, Muscio goes on to look at the term ‘izzat’ (the last term of the 101 words on the cover). Izzat, she says, is ‘the regard in which you hold yourself’. This is importance, Muscio argues, for “when you know you are worth loving and fighting for, then you can love and fight for the world.”< span> (201) By being present within the world and ‘protecting our izzat’ we are able to negotiate much of the violence in our lives and in the lives of those around us, and by extension—making the world a better place.

Chapter 8: My Mother's Roses: Within the last section of the book, Muscio looks at defining what love is and what it is not. She states that “real love means finding value in most everything, and new ways to value yourself, the planet, animals, trees, people you like, people you don't like, and so on.” (224) She criticizes mainstream media and the cultural environment for their constant depiction of ‘ fairytale love’ and she draws attention to the differences between ‘ sexual intercourse’ and ‘sexual intimacy’, two terms she claims that have been wrongfully used interchangeably. At the end of the book, Muscio lists twenty-six ways to love and notes that the “most fun challenge is bringing all this love out in the violent world we live in”. (261)
