= Proverbs of Hendyng =

13th-century poem in Middle English

The Proverbs of Hendyng is a poem from around the second half of the thirteenth century in which one Hendyng, son of Marcolf, utters a series of proverbial stanzas. It stands in a tradition of Middle-English proverbial poetry also attested by The Proverbs of Alfred; the two texts include some proverbs in common. The rhyme scheme is AABCCB.

Marcolf appears as an interlocutor with Solomon in some German poems in the Solomon and Saturn tradition, while "Hendyng" seems to be a personification generated from the word hende ("skilled, clever"), and seems to mean something like "the clever one". In The Proverbs of Hendyng, "Hending ... is represented as the author of a collection of traditional proverbial wisdom in South-West Midland Middle English, each proverb ending with 'quoth Hending'", a construction like that of a Wellerism.

The Proverbs of Hendyng is also noted for containing the earliest attestation of the word cunt in English outside placenames and personal names.

== Manuscripts ==
Ten manuscripts are known to attest to the poem in whole or in part (sometimes only one stanza or couplet). The most complete include:

- Cambridge, University Library, Gg.I.1 (a MS in one hand, from the earlier fourteenth century, also including the Northern Passion, apparently produced in Ireland as the language shows influence from Middle Hiberno-English).
- Oxford, Bodleian Library, Digby 86 (a verse miscellany in French and English from Gloucestershire in the last quarter of the thirteenth century, also including lyrics, the Middle English Harrowing of Hell, and The Vox and the Wolf).
- London, British Library, Harley MS 2253 (containing an exceptionally wide range of texts, from Herefordshire), ff. 125r-126v.

The others are:

- Cambridge, Gonville and Caius College 351/568
- Cambridge, Pembroke College, 100
- Cambridge, St. John's College, 145
- Cambridge, University Library, Additional 4407 (a manuscript probably from West Norfolk, also including Havelok the Dane).
- Durham Cathedral, Dean and Chapter Library, B.I.18
- London, British Library, Harley MS 3823
- London, British Library, Royal MS 8.E.xvii

== Editions ==
- Specimens of Early English, ed. by Richard Morris and Walter W. Skeat, 4th edn, 2 vols (Oxford: Clarendon Press, 1872), II 35-42; https://archive.org/details/specimensofearly02fryeuoft.
- 'Art. 89, Mon that wol of wysdam heren', ed. by Susanna Greer Fein, in The Complete Harley 2253 Manuscript, ed. by Susanna Fein with David Raybin and Jan Ziolkowski 3 vols (2014-), III http://d.lib.rochester.edu/teams/text/fein-harley2253-volume-3-article-89 (the Harley 2253 text)
- Manuscript Harleian 2253: Facsimile of British Museum ms. Harley 2253, ed. by N. R. Ker, Early English Text Society, o. s., 255 (London: Oxford University Press, 1965), ff. 125r-126v.
