= Gropecunt Lane =

Street name in England in the Middle Ages

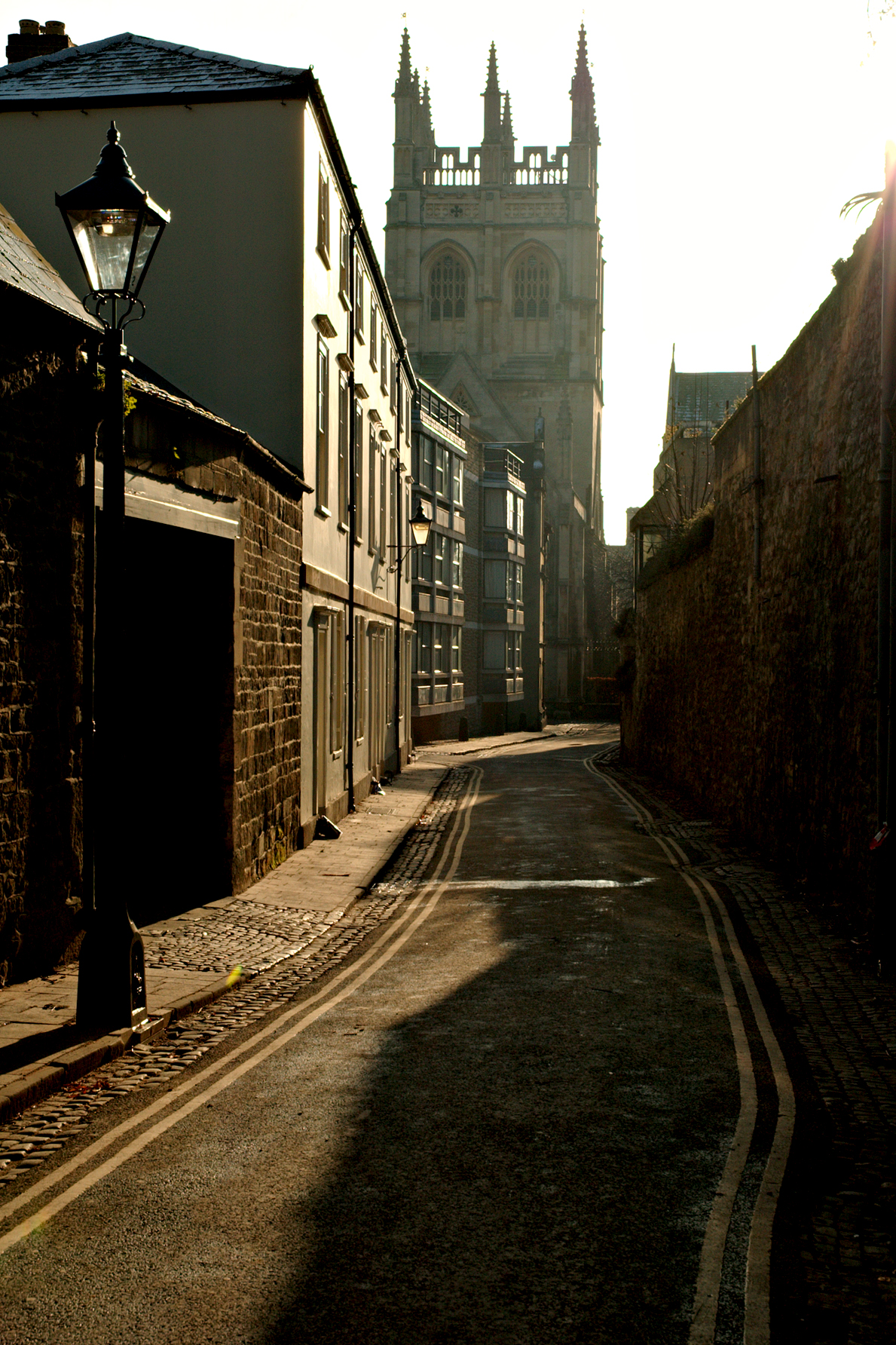
Magpie Lane in Oxford, once known as Gropecunt Lane

Gropecunt Lane (/ˈɡroʊpkʌnt/) was a street name found in English towns and cities during the Middle Ages, believed to be a reference to the prostitution centred on those areas; it was normal practice for a medieval street name to reflect the street's function or the economic activity taking place within it. Gropecunt, the earliest known use of which is in about 1230, appears to have been derived as a compound of the words grope and cunt. Streets with that name were often in the busiest parts of medieval towns and cities, and at least one appears to have been an important thoroughfare.

Although the name was once common throughout England, changes in attitude resulted in its replacement by more innocuous versions such as Grape Lane. A variation of Gropecunt was last recorded as a street name in 1561.

== Toponymy ==
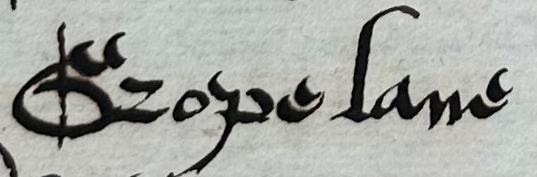
Grope Lane, Bristol, 1542

Variations include Gropecunte, Gropecountelane, Gropecontelane, Groppecountelane and Gropekuntelane. There were once many such street names in England, but all have now been bowdlerised. In the city of York, for instance, Grapcunt Lane—grāp is the Old English word for grope—was renamed as Grape Lane. Bristol's 'Gropecount Lane', recorded by that form in the late fifteenth century had been contracted to Grope Lane by the 1540s, sometimes then being euphemised to 'Grape Lane'. The first record of the word grope being used in the sense of sexual touching appears in 1380; cunt has been used to describe the vulva since at least 1230, and has cognates in many Germanic languages, although its precise etymology is uncertain.

== Prostitution ==
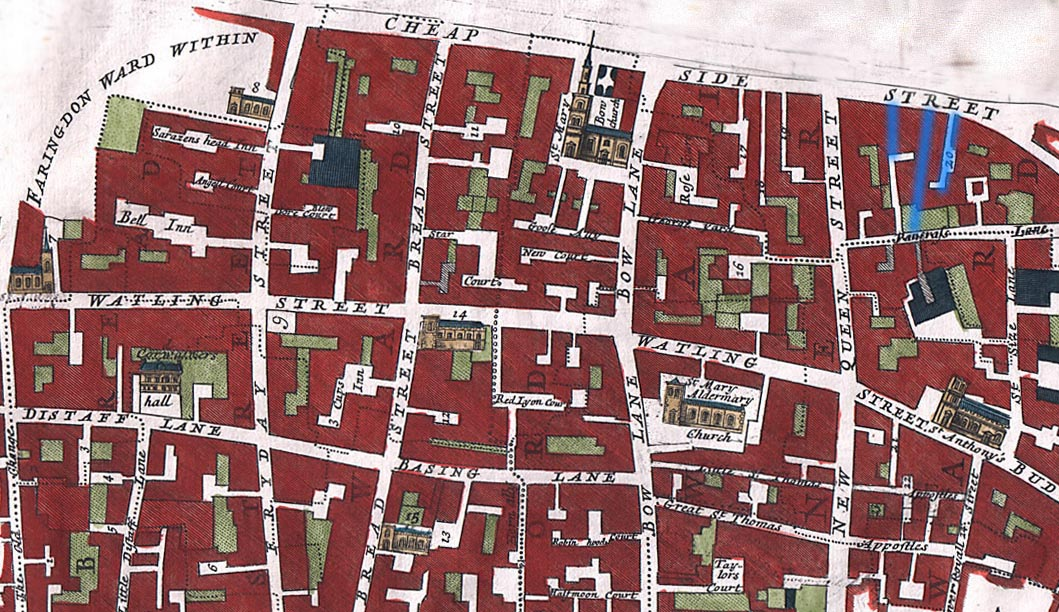
A 1720 map of Bread Street and Cordwainer wards included in a 19th-century edition of John Stow's Survey of the Cities of London and Westminster. The routes of three extinct streets are highlighted in blue, Puppekirtylane on the left, "Grope Countlane" in the middle, and Bordhawlane on the right. The location is opposite the modern-day Mercers' Hall. Little Fryday Street [sic] (Pissing Alley) is visible on the left.

Under its entry for the word cunt, the Oxford English Dictionary reports that a street was listed as Gropecuntlane in about 1230, the first appearance of that name. According to author Angus McIntyre, organised prostitution was well established in London by the middle of the 12th century, initially mainly confined to Southwark in the southeast, but later spreading to other areas such as Smithfield, Shoreditch, Clerkenwell, and Westminster. The practice was often tolerated by the authorities, and there are many historical examples of it being dealt with by regulation rather than by censure: in 1393 the authorities in London allowed prostitutes to work only in Cokkes Lane (Note: In passus 5 of Piers Plowman the writer mentions a "Clarice of Cokkeslane and the Clerk of the chirche".) (now known as Cock Lane) and in 1285 French prostitutes in Montpellier were confined to a single street.

It was normal practice for medieval street names to reflect their function, or the economic activity taking place within them (especially the commodities available for sale), hence the frequency of names such as The Shambles, Silver Street, Fish Street, and Swinegate (pork butchers) in cities with a medieval history. Prostitution may well have been a normal aspect of medieval urban life; in A survey of London (1598) John Stow describes Love Lane as "so called of Wantons". The more graphic Gropecunt Lane, however, is possibly the most obvious allusion to paid sexual activity, although Bristol's Hoorstrete (Whore's Street) also seems unambiguous. By contrast, Fucking Grove in Bristol lay in a secluded and rural part of the medieval town lands. Sexual activity there may thus have been more recreational than transactional.

== Changing sensibilities ==
The Oxford English Dictionary defines the word cunt as "The female external genital organs" and notes "Its currency is restricted in the manner of other taboo-words: see the small-type note s.v. FUCK v." During the Middle Ages, the word may have often been considered merely vulgar, having been in common use in its anatomical sense since at least the 13th century. In "The Miller's Tale", Geoffrey Chaucer writes "And prively he caughte hire by the queynte" (and intimately he caught her by her crotch), and the comedy Philotus (1603) mentions "put doun thy hand and graip hir cunt." Gradually, though, the word became used more as the obscenity it is generally considered to be today. In John Garfield's Wandring Whore II (1660) the word is applied to a woman, specifically a whore—"this is none of your pittiful Sneakesbyes and Raskalls that will offer a sturdy C— but eighteen pence or two shillings, and repent of the business afterwards". Francis Grose's A Classical Dictionary of The Vulgar Tongue (1785) lists the word as "C**t. The chonnos of the Greek, and the cunnus of the Latin dictionaries; a nasty name for a nasty thing: un con Miege."

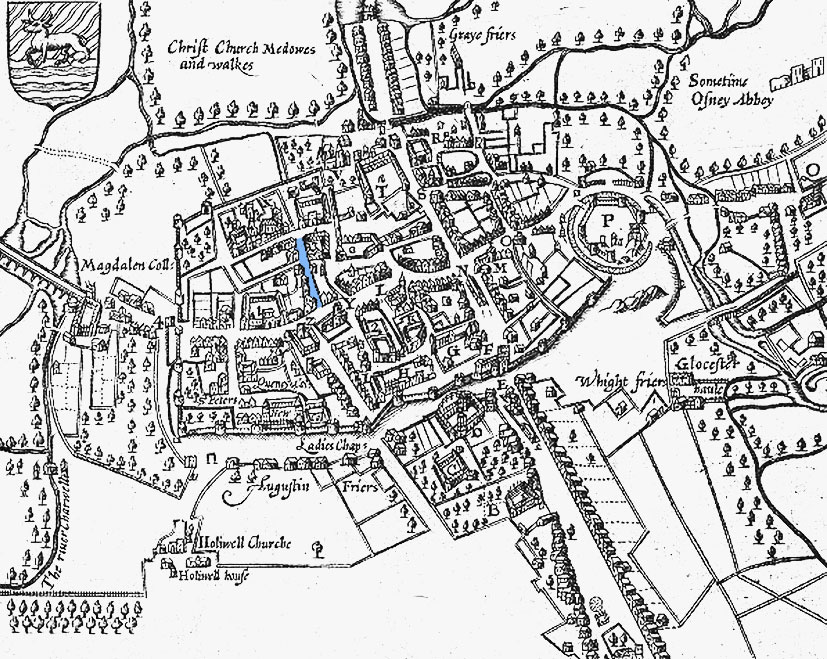
John Speed's 1605 map of Oxford, with Gropecunt Lane, by then Grope or Grape Lane, highlighted in blue. The major road it connects to is High Street, and north is at the bottom.

Although some medieval street names such as Addle Street (stinking urine, or other liquid filth; mire) and Fetter Lane (once Fewterer, meaning "idle and disorderly person") have survived, others have been changed in deference to contemporary attitudes. Sherborne Lane in London was in 1272–73 known as Shitteborwelane, later Shite-burn lane and Shite-buruelane (possibly due to nearby cesspits). Pissing Alley, one of several identically named streets whose names survived the Great Fire of London, was called Little Friday Street in 1848, before being absorbed into Cannon Street in 1853–54.

As the most ubiquitous and explicit example of such street names, with the exception of Shrewsbury and possibly Newcastle (where a Grapecuntlane was mentioned in 1588) the use of Gropecunt seems to have fallen out of favour by the 14th century. Its steady disappearance from the English vernacular may have been the result of a gradual cleaning-up of the name; Gropecuntelane in 13th-century Wells became Grope Lane, and then in the 19th century, Grove Lane. The ruling Protestant conservative elite's growing hostility to prostitution during the 16th century resulted in the closure of the Southwark stews in 1546, replacing earlier attempts at regulation.

== Locations ==
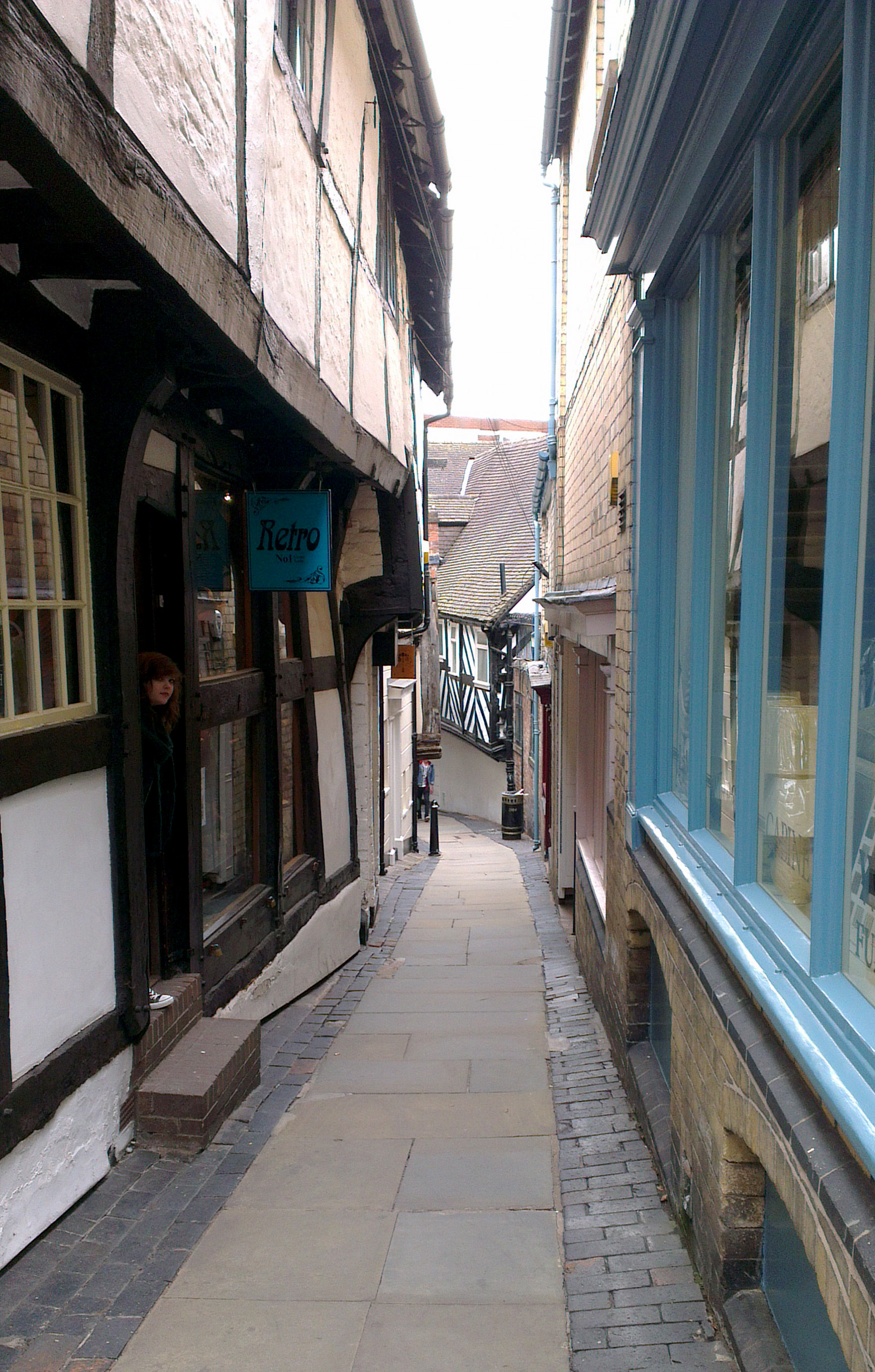
Grope Lane in Shrewsbury

London had several streets named Gropecunt Lane, including one in the parishes of St Pancras, Soper Lane and St Mary Colechurch, between Bordhawelane (bordello) and Puppekirty Lane (poke skirt) near present-day Cheapside. First recorded in 1279 as Gropecontelane and Groppecountelane, it was part of a collection of streets which appears to have survived as a small island of prostitution outside Southwark, where such activities were normally confined during the medieval period.

The name was also used in other large medieval towns across England, including Bristol, York, Shrewsbury, Newcastle upon Tyne, Worcester, Hereford, Southampton and Oxford. Norwich's Gropekuntelane (now Opie Street) was recorded in Latin as turpis vicus, the shameful street. In 1230 Oxford's Magpie Lane was known as Gropecunt Lane, renamed Grope or Grape Lane in the 13th century, and then Magpie Lane in the mid-17th century. It was again renamed in 1850 as Grove Street, before once again assuming the name Magpie Lane in the 20th century. Newcastle and Worcester each had a Grope Lane close to their public quays. York's survives, now bowdlerised to Grape Lane. In their 2001 study of medieval prostitution, using the Historic Towns Atlas as a source, historian Richard Holt and archaeologist Nigel Baker of the University of Birmingham studied sexually suggestive street names around England. They concluded that there was a close association between a street with the name Gropecunt Lane, which was almost always in the centre of town, and that town's principal market-place or high street. This correlation suggests that these streets not only provided for the sexual gratification of local men, but also for visiting stall-holders.

Such trade may explain the relative uniformity of the name across the country. Streets named Gropecunt Lane are recorded in several smaller market towns such as Banbury, Glastonbury, and the city of Wells, where a street of that name existed in 1300, regularly mentioned in legal documents of the time. Parsons Street in Banbury was first recorded as Gropecunt Lane in 1333, and may have been an important thoroughfare, but by 1410 its name had been changed to Parsons Lane. Grape Lane in Whitby may once have been Grope Lane, or Grapcunt Lane. Gropecunte Lane in Glastonbury, later known as Grope lane, now St. Benedicts Court, was recorded in 1290 and 1425. A street called Grope Countelane existed in Shrewsbury as recently as 1561, connecting the town's two principal marketplaces. At some date unrecorded the street was renamed Grope Lane, a name it has retained. In Thomas Phillips' History and Antiquities of Shrewsbury (1799) the author is explicit in his understanding of the origin of the name as a place of "scandalous lewdness and venery", but Archdeacon Hugh Owen's Some account of the ancient and present state of Shrewsbury (1808) describes it as "called Grope, or the Dark Lane". As a result of these differing accounts, some local tour guides attribute the name to "feeling one's way along a dark and narrow thoroughfare".

== See also ==
- Place names considered unusual
