= Magpie Lane =

English folk group

Magpie Lane is an English folk group, based in Oxford, England.

The musicians of Magpie Lane first came together in the winter of 1992–93 to record The Oxford Ramble, a collection of songs and tunes from, or about, Oxfordshire. Originally conceived as a one-off recording project, the success of The Oxford Ramble and early concerts and appearances in Oxford and further afield led to the release of a second CD, Speed the Plough, a year later.

Further recordings followed, celebrating seasonal folk customs of the British Isles: a collection of traditional Festive songs and tunes in Wassail: a Country Christmas; and Jack-in-the-Green, which celebrates customs around May Day and Midsummer. In 2000, the band were asked to record a companion album for A Taste of Ale, a book by the author and folksong scholar, Roy Palmer. This album was one of two to feature Benji Kirkpatrick on vocals and string instruments.

The band have continued to release albums and perform regularly in concerts, folk clubs and festivals in the UK. In 2018, they released their 10th studio album, The 25th, the title of which plays on its Christmastime theme as well as being in celebration of the band's 25th anniversary. It was released in December, to coincide with the band's 25th annual Christmas concert at the Holywell Music Room.

The band takes its name from Magpie Lane, a street in central Oxford, and the title of the tune that opens their first album, The Oxford Ramble.

== Personnel ==
=== Current Line-up ===
- Ian Giles (vocals, percussion)
- Andy Turner (vocals, anglo-concertina, one-row melodeon)
- Mat Green (fiddle, vocals)
- Sophie Thurman ('cello, vocals)
- Jon Fletcher (vocals, bouzouki, guitar)

=== Former members ===
- Tom Bower (woodwind, vocals, percussion) - 1993–2000
- Isobel Dams (vocals, 'cello) - 1993–1994
- Joanne Acty (vocals) - 1993–1999
- Peter Acty (vocals, guitar, mandola) - 1993–1999
- Di Whitehead ('cello, woodwind, vocals) - 1993–2000
- Benji Kirkpatrick (bouzouki, guitar, vocals) - 1999–2004
- Marguerite Hutchinson (woodwind, vocals, bagpipes) - 2001–2008

== Discography ==
- The Oxford Ramble (Beautiful Jo Records, 1993)
- Speed the Plough (Beautiful Jo Records, 1994)
- Wassail: A Country Christmas (Beautiful Jo Records, 1995)
- Jack-in-the-Green (Beautiful Jo Records, 1998) BEJOCD-22
- A Taste of Ale (Beautiful Jo Records, 2000)
- Six for Gold (Beautiful Jo Records, 2002)
- Knock at the Knocker Ring at the Bell (Beautiful Jo Records, 2006)
- The Robber Bird (Magpie Lane, 2011)
- Three Quarter Time (Magpie Lane, 2017)
- The 25th (Magpie Lane, 2018)
