= Magpie Lane, Oxford =

Lane in central Oxford, England

Coordinates: 51.751638°N 1.253104°W

Views along Magpie Lane

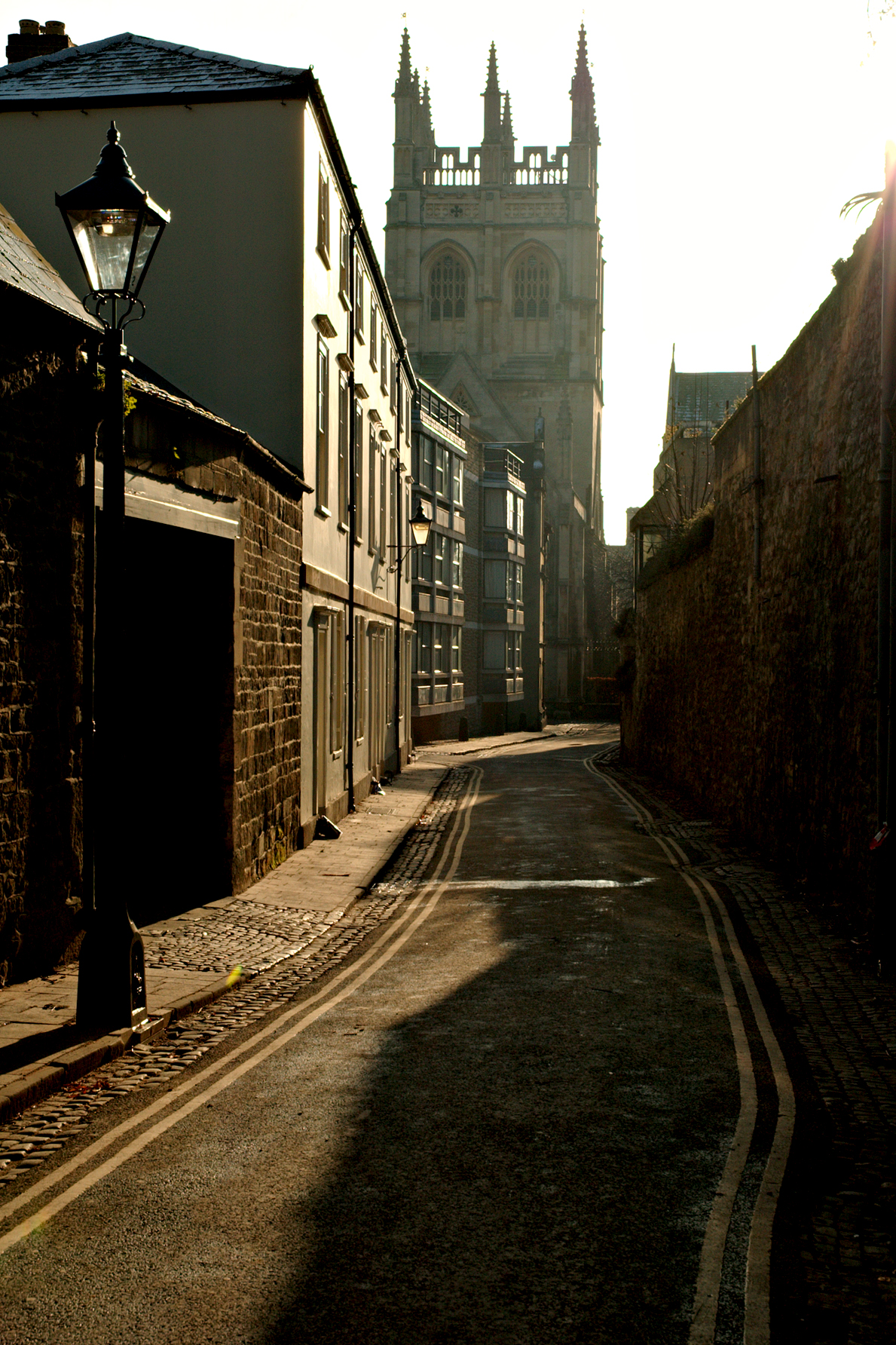
View south, towards Merton College Chapel

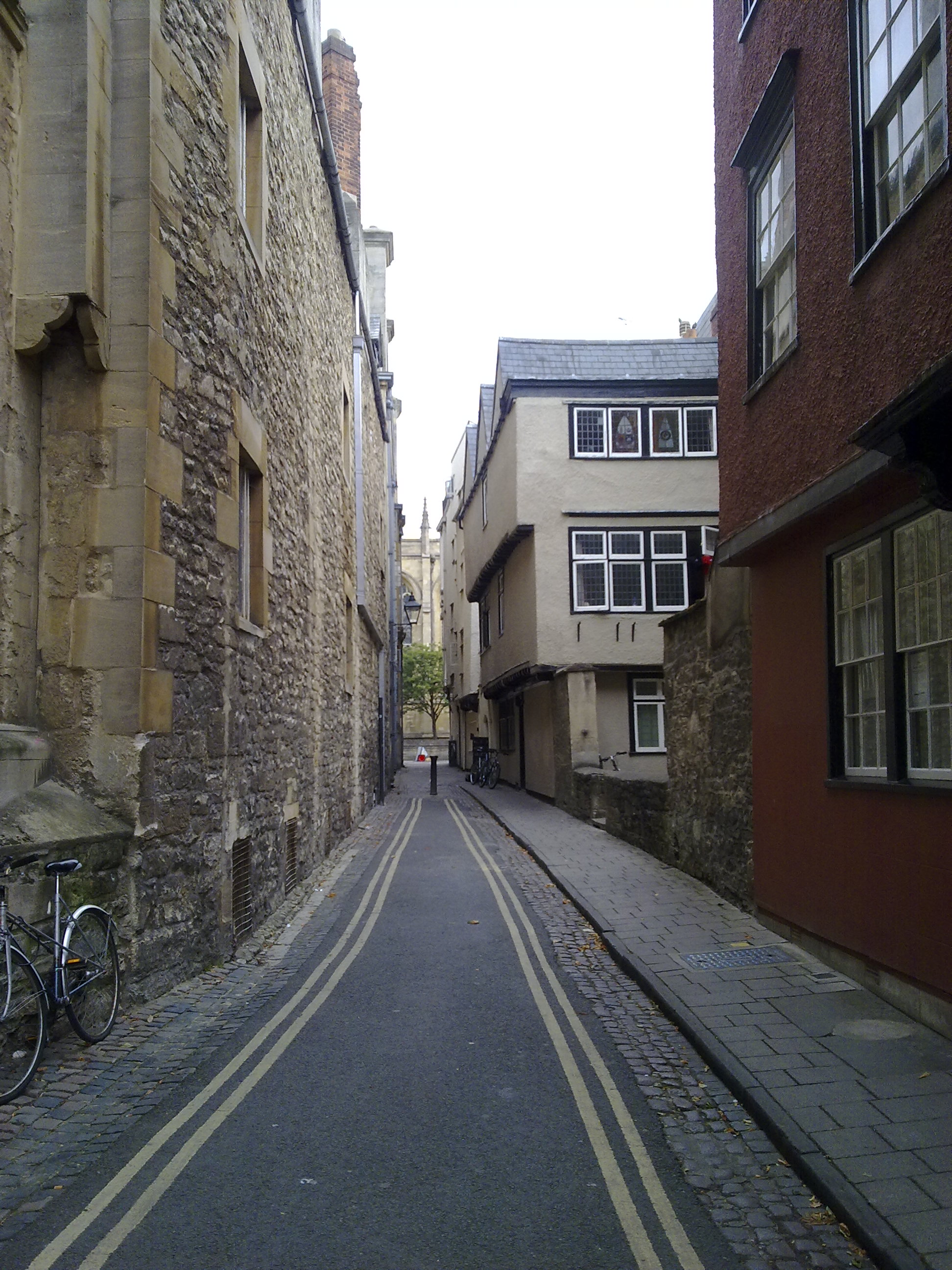
View north, towards the High Street

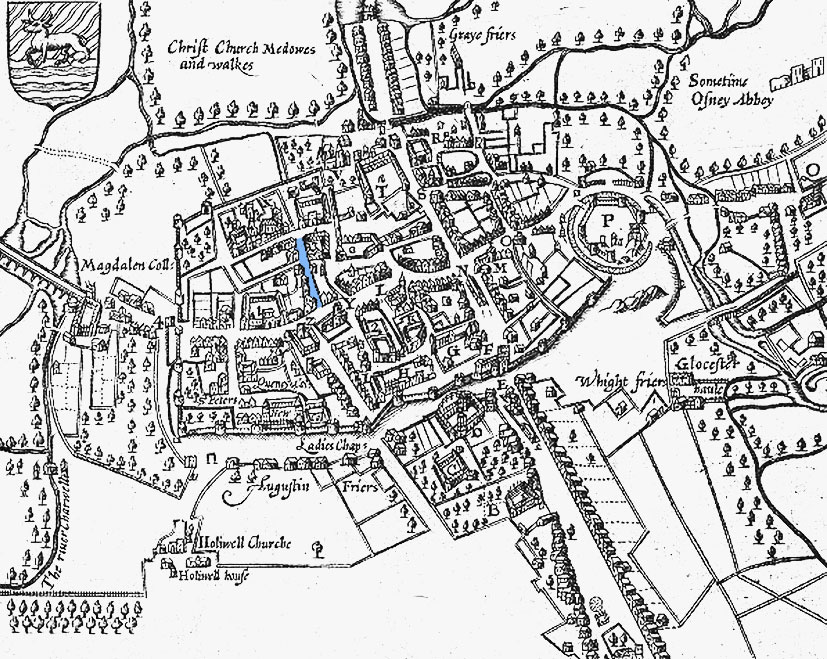
John Speed's 1605 map of Oxford, with Gropecunt Lane, by then Grope or Grape Lane, highlighted in blue. The major road it connects to is High Street, and north is at the bottom.

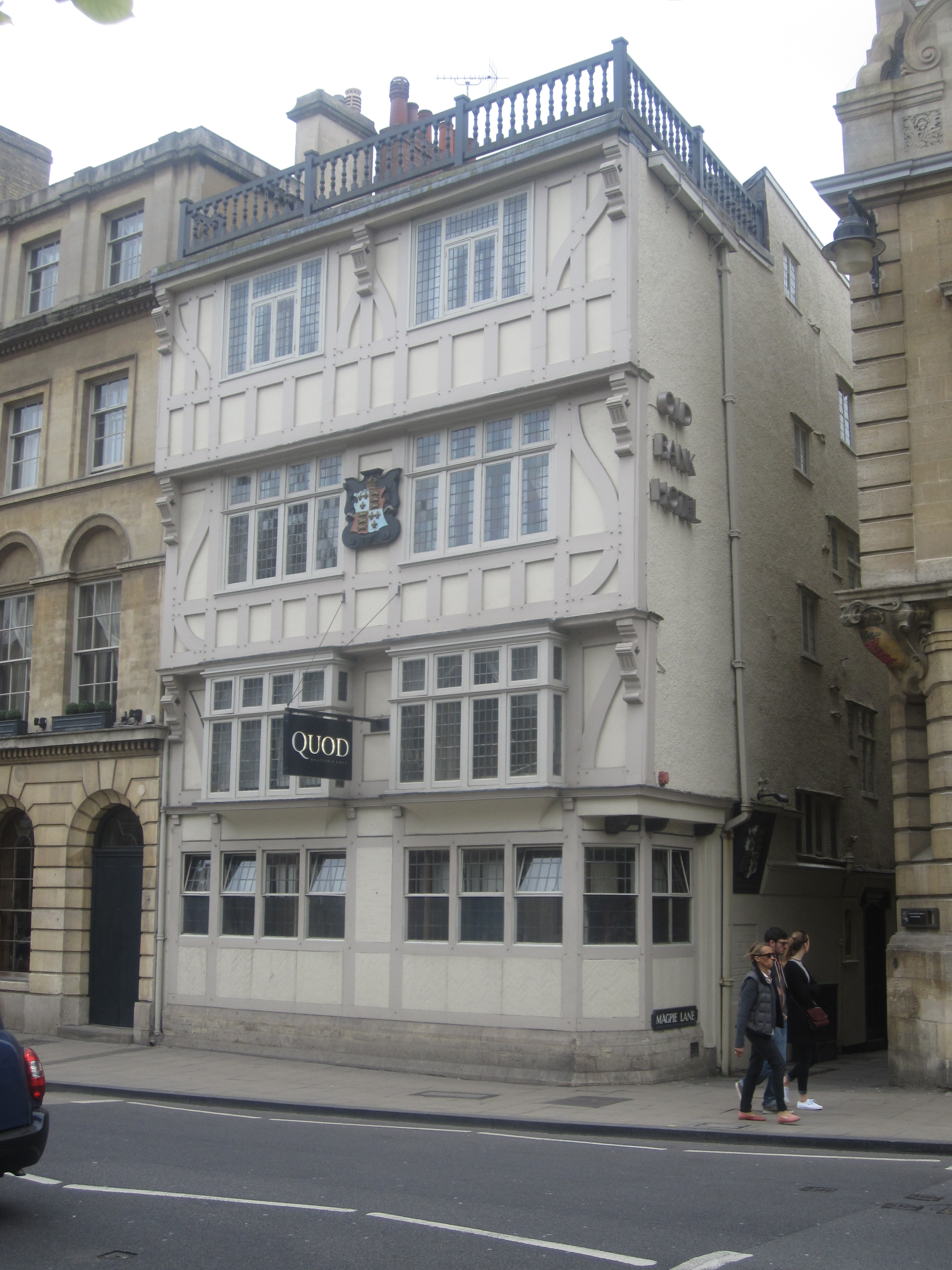
94 High Street next to the narrow entrance to Magpie Lane on the right.

Magpie Lane is a narrow historic lane in central Oxford, England. It leads south from the High Street where it is at its narrowest, now completely pedestrianised as a pavement, and north from the cobbled Merton Street.

To the west is Oriel College (including the Rhodes building of 1910 at the northern end) and to the east is University College, two of the oldest Oxford colleges. On the northeast corner there is a 1902 house, now the Quod restaurant. A small cul-de-sac street, Kybald Street, leads off Magpie Lane at the southern end to the east, giving access to the rear of University College and Kybald Twychen, owned by Corpus Christi College.

South from Merton Street, the lane continues as Grove Walk (a.k.a. Merton Grove or Grove Passage) between Merton College to the east and Corpus Christi College to the west, giving pedestrian access via railinged gates to Dead Man's Walk, Merton Field, and Christ Church Meadows. The building in the south-western corner of Merton College is also called Grove. The name perhaps has been derived from this area having been used as an orchard.

== History ==
In the 13th century, Magpie Lane was known as Gropecunt Lane or Grope Lane, as it was an area where prostitutes plied their trade. John Speed's map of 1605 lists it as such. In the 17th century, it was named Magpie Lane because of an alehouse in the lane that used a magpie as a sign. By the late 19th century, the lane was known as Grove Street but in 1927 the name was changed back to Magpie Lane.

The houses between Kybald Street and Merton Street were demolished in the 1960s by Corpus Christi College to provide space for more modern student accommodation.

== See also ==
- Magpie Lane, an Oxford-based folk music group
