= Fucking Grove =

Place in medieval Bristol, England

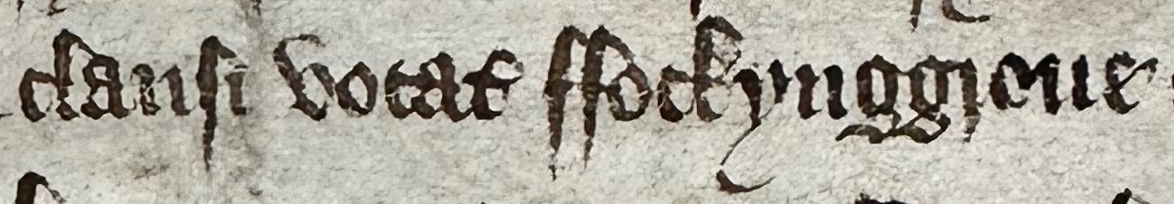
[in cornerio cuiusdam] 'clausi vocati Fockynggroue': [in the corner of a certain] field called Fucking Grove

Fucking Grove (alias Fockynggroue, Fockyngrove, Fokeing Grove, Foking Grove, Fukkyngroue) is the name of a medieval field in Bristol. The name continued to be used up to the early twentieth century, albeit from the seventeenth century it was euphemised to Pucking Grove. The field name is first recorded in 1373 when Bristol received a royal charter that turned Bristol into an independent county. The charter included a formal survey of the county boundary, which corresponded to the existing town lands. This survey was recorded as an appendix to the charter, under the Great Seal of England. It took the form of a perambulation of the seven-mile land boundary, describing the features that marked the way, such as ditches and stone boundary markers. This was necessary to define the limits of the new county and thus, for example, the jurisdiction of the sheriffs of Bristol.

One of pre-existing boundary stones was described in the perambulation survey as 'a stone fixed in the corner of a certain close (i.e., field) called Fockynggrove' (lapidem fixum in cornerio cuiusdam clausi vocati Fockynggroue). Since this was a legal document, later surveys and perambulations continue to employ the term—albeit in later published descriptions the 'F' was changed to a 'P', presumably because of the embarrassment caused by reproducing a rude word within polite publications.

== Origin and meaning ==
The etymology of the place name 'Fockynggrove' has been explored by the Richard Coates, Professor of Onomastics. He suggests that 'the initial suspicion must be that the name is etymologically 'fucking grove', and the forms from later perambulations tend to support the suspicion'. As a place name it may be compared to places such as 'Love Grove' or 'Love Lane', while being less subtle in referencing the activity of those frequenting it.

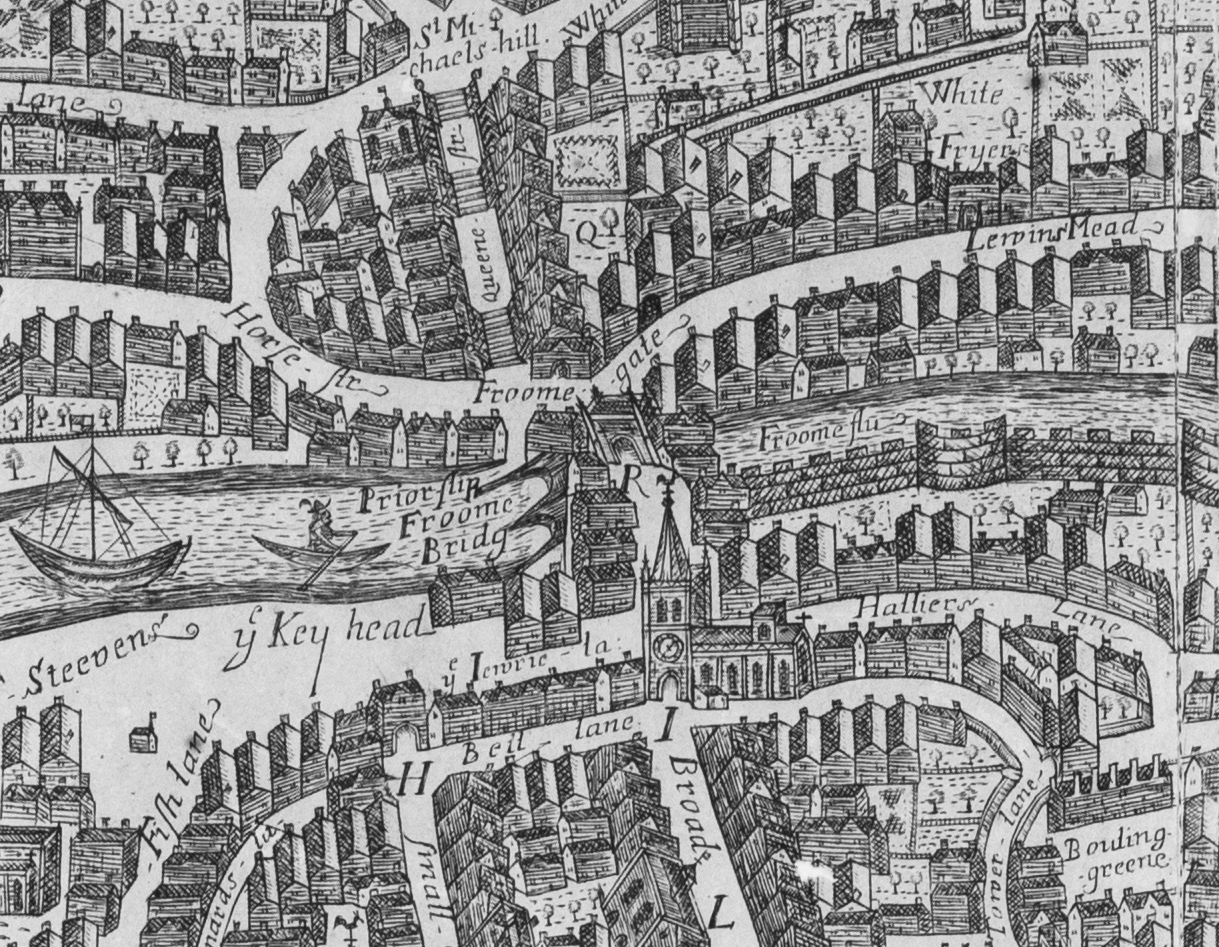
Key Head of Bristol, 1728

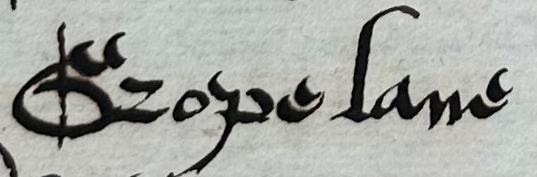
Grope Lane, Bristol, 1542

By modern standards, medieval people were not coy about sex. Bristol, for instance, had both a 'Whores Street' and a 'Grope Cunt Lane', both of which lay in the centre of the city, near the Quay Head. Medieval 'Horstrete' or 'Hoorstrete' was later rendered as 'Horse Street', before being changed to 'Host Street', which it is still known by. The latter appears to be a euphemistic reference to the profession of those who worked on the street. Medieval 'Gropecount Lane', was later contracted to 'Grope Lane', or 'Grape Lane'. In the late seventeenth century it was redesignated 'Hallier's Lane', before finally being renamed 'Nelson Street' in the nineteenth century in honour Admiral Lord Nelson, following his death at the Battle of Trafalgar.

Richard Coates' main interest in 'Fockynggrove' was that it embeds the earliest known use of the verbal noun 'fucking'. Indeed, it is the earliest known use of 'fuck' in any verbal form in English. Earlier usages record 'fuck' used as a noun—as in 'a fuck'.

== Location ==
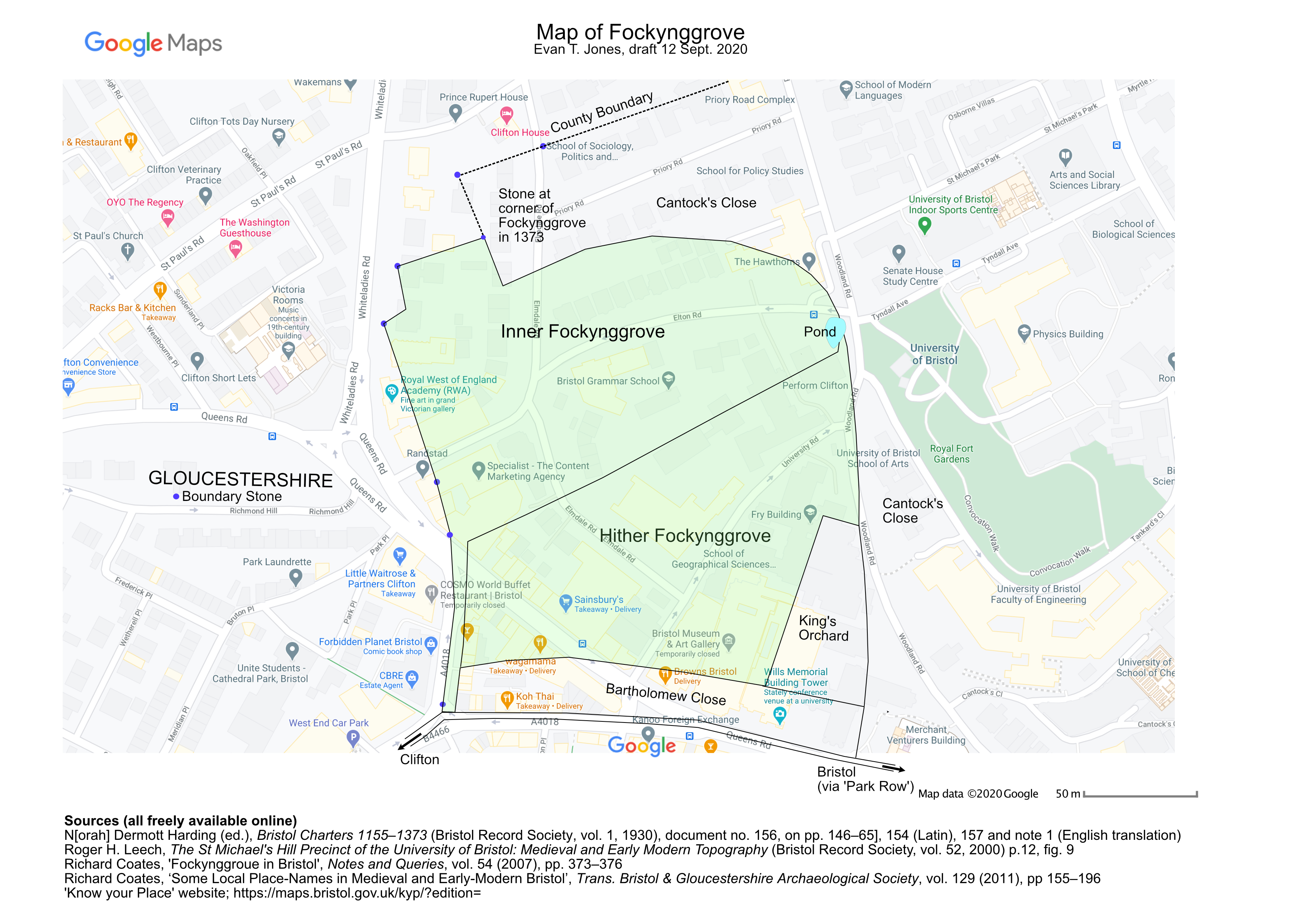
Map of Fucking Grove presented in 2020 research seminar

The exact location and boundaries of Fucking Grove were determined by Roger Leech (University of Southampton) in his reconstruction of the topography and built environment of the St Michael's Hill area of Bristol. However, in his publication, which is largely based on later sources, he uses the form 'Pucking Grove' in his maps. The 'P' seems to have replaced the 'F', at least in official documents by 1634. By the that time the field had been divided into two: 'Hither' and 'Inner'. The 1736 survey of the county boundary suggests that Inner Fucking Grove was sometimes also known as Little Pucking (or Fucking) Grove. The 1736 survey also indicates that a contiguous area was also known as 'Honeypan Hill'. It is referred to as 'Honeypen-hill' in an 1842 guidebook, and as 'Honeypen Hill' in nineteenth-century deeds. 'Honey' was a common colloquial term for a lover or sweetheart from the fourteenth-century onwards. Honeypen Hill, however, was on the other side of the county boundary in the parish of Clifton.

In 2020, Evan Jones (University of Bristol) used Leech's work, combined with that of Coates and early maps from 'Know your Place: Bristol', to create a map that situated the grove within the modern city. The grove was then discussed in an online asynchronous seminar within the History Department during the 'Covid Lockdown': 'Fucking Grove: A history that dare not speak its name?' (University of Bristol, October 2020). The title of the seminar related to the seeming reluctance of previous historians to discuss the grove, to place it within the modern city, or to consider what it might reveal about pre-modern sexual practices.

== Activity within the Grove ==
Other than the place-name evidence, nobody has yet noted any evidence about what actually went on in the grove, of how long it was associated with sexual activity, or of the sort of people who engaged in sexual activity there. As a place, however, it was quite different from Whore's Street and Grope Cunt Lane in the city centre, down by the docks. Both Whore's Street and Gropecunt Lane (a name found in many English medieval towns) reference sex work. By contrast, Fucking Grove was one of the most secluded and probably pleasant parts of the town and county of Bristol. It is about 200 feet above the river and the docks on what early modern pictures suggest to be a green and open or lightly wooded area. Roger Leech's topographical survey suggest that the grove contained no dwelling houses until the late eighteenth century. Today the grove lies within Clifton, an area developed during the Georgian era by wealthy Bristolians who wished to escape the smoke, smells and pollution of the city centre. It is thus possible that Fucking Grove had simply acquired its name and reputation because it was a pleasant place to have sex. Most people lived in crowded houses where several people might share a bedroom, or even a bed. Fucking Grove might thus have offered more privacy than urban people could expect at home. Provided those having sex were married, were discreet and avoided public nudity, the Church had no reason to condemn such activity.
