= The Proverbs of Alfred =

12th-century collection of sayings in Middle English

The Proverbs of Alfred is a collection of early Middle English sayings ascribed to King Alfred the Great (called "England's darling"), said to have been uttered at an assembly in Seaford, East Sussex. The collection of proverbs was probably put together in Sussex in the mid-12th century. The manuscript evidence suggests the text originated at either a Cluniac or a Benedictine monastery: either Lewes Priory, 10 mi (16 km) to the north of Seaford, or Battle Abbey, 25 mi (40 km) to the north-east.

== Transmission ==
The Proverbs of Alfred survive in four manuscripts of the 13th century:

- Cotton Galba A. xix (MS C)
- Maidstone Museum A.13 (MS M)
- Cambridge, Trinity College, B.14.39 (MS T)
- Oxford, Jesus College, 29 (MS J)

The text appears to have been produced in the late 12th century. There is no reason to suppose that any of the proverbs go back to King Alfred. King Alfred, who translated several works into the vernacular, is not known to have translated or composed proverbs. However, his legendary status in later tradition gave him a reputation for having done so, as the Middle English poem The Owl and the Nightingale likewise suggests. Some of the proverbs in the Proverbs of Alfred appear elsewhere under another name (Hendyng, which may itself be less of a proper name than an adjective).

== Form and contents ==
The proverbs are in alliterative verse, but the verse does not adhere to the rules of classical Old English poetry. Caesurae are present in every line, but the lines are broken in two (cf. Pearl). The collection shows signs of transition in verse form from the earlier Anglo-Saxon alliterative form to the new Norman rhyme form, for rhyme occasionally occurs in the poetry. Late in the poem, the verse even picks up Norman metre and something like a couplet form. At the same time, the proverbs resemble the gnomic compositions of earlier Anglo-Saxon instruction. The proverbs are expressed as highly compressed metaphors that are halfway to the poetry found in the Anglo-Saxon riddle and Gnomic Verses. Collections of sayings and precepts were common in Latin as well, but the distinctive compression of the Alfredian proverbs is clearly a sign of their Anglo-Saxon origin.

Given that it is most likely that the author and his antecedents gathered up proverbs over time, the heterogeneous contents of the book are predictable. The proverbs contain popular wisdom, religious instruction, and advice on the wickedness of women. The latter is most likely a scribal interpolation.

== Sample ==
An example of the Proverbs is lines 423–448, here in the translation of Christopher Cannon.

þus queþ Alured:
Eure þu bi þine luye
þe word of þine wyue.
to swiþe þu ne arede.
If heo beo i-wreþþed
myd worde oþer myd dede
wymmon wepeþ for mod
oftere þan for eny god
And ofte lude & stille
for to vor-drye hire wille.
Heo wepeþ oþer-hwile
for to do þe gyle
Salomon hit haueþ i-sed
þat wymmon can wel vuelne red.
þe hire red foleweþ
heo bryngeþ hine to seorewe
for hit seyþ in þe loþ
as scumes for-teoþ
hit is i-furn i-seyd
þat cold red is quene red.
hu he is unlede
þat foleweþ hire rede.
Ich hit ne segge nought for-þan
þat god þing ys god wymmon.
þe mon þe hi may i-cheose
and i-couere over oþre.

Translation:

Thus said Alfred:
Do not, ever in your life,
take the word of your wife
too quickly as counsel.
If she is angered
by some word or deed
a woman weeps for anger
more often than for any good reason.
And often she is loud as well as quiet
in order to get her own way.
She weeps at other times
in order to deceive.
Solomon has said
that a woman is good at giving bad advice.
He who follows her advice
she brings to sorrow.
For it says in the song
how women deceive,
[and] it was said long ago
that a woman’s advice is bad advice,
[and] how he is miserable
who follows her advice.
I do not say therefore
that a good woman is a good thing
when a man can choose her
and win her over others.
