= Inga Muscio =

American feminist, writer and public speaker

- Born: 1966 (age 59–60); Santa Maria, California, United States
- Occupations: Writer, public speaker
- Writing career
- Subjects: Popular culture, sex, feminism

Inga Muscio (born c. 1966) is an American feminist, writer and public speaker. Her books include Cunt: A Declaration of Independence (1998) and Rose: Love in Violent Times (2010).

== Work ==
Muscio's book, Cunt: A Declaration of Independence (Seal Press, 1998), calls for women to break down boundaries between themselves, their bodies, and each other. The book was given the 1999 Firecracker Alternative Book Award for Nonfiction.

Her book Autobiography of a Blue-Eyed Devil: My Life and Times in a Racist Imperialist Society (Seal Press, 2005) examines and critiques white privilege, racism, and colonialism among other issues.

Her third book, Rose: Love in Violent Times (Seven Stories Press, 2010), examines the presence of passive and physical violence in our daily lives and describes how we might find love within this violence.
