= Cunt: A Declaration of Independence =

1998 book by Inga Muscio

- Author: Inga Muscio
- Language: English
- Published: 1998 Seal Press
- Publication place: United States
- Media type: Paperback
- Pages: 416
- ISBN: 978-1580050753 (2nd Edition)
- OCLC: 52644461
- Dewey Decimal: 305.4 21
- LC Class: HQ1233 .M87 2002

Cunt: A Declaration of Independence is a 1998 feminist book by Inga Muscio that calls for a breakdown in the boundaries between women and sexuality. In it, the writer hopes to reverse the negative connotations behind female pejoratives. The book traverses such subjects as menstruation, rape, and competition between women.

The book was placed at number six on a list of "Best-Selling Lesbian Books" in May 2000 by Curve magazine. The magazine gave the work a positive review and recommended it to its readers. off our backs praised the book and noted its importance for women and feminists. Herizons called it an enjoyable read and one of the best within the field of feminism and the female body since Women's Bodies, Women's Wisdom. The book received a critical review from Publishers Weekly.

The word cunt inspired a movement called Cuntfest, a celebration of the female gender, and Cuntfest events were held with multiple artists in different cities in the United States after the book's publication. The book became an important piece of third-wave feminism, the importance of "pussy power", and courage in women, and was required reading in a course about women's health at the University of Virginia.

== Publication history ==
Cunt: A Declaration of Independence was first published in 1998 by Seal Press. An expanded second edition was released by the same publisher in 2002. The foreword to the second edition of the book was written by sex educator Betty Dodson. The second edition was again released by the publisher in 2005.

== Content summary ==
Muscio begins by discussing the origins of the terms vagina and cunt. She makes the point that vagina is a medical term referring to a specific part of the female genitalia, while 'cunt,' despite its very negative usage, refers to "the whole package" of womanhood. She explains that 'cunt' is a powerful word, while vagina comes from the Latin meaning 'sword sheath' and concludes that she "ain't got no vagina".

The next section of the book discusses how women have been made to feel ashamed of menstruation, often being told that the pain and discomfort they experience is "all in their heads" and that women need to shower every day to avoid the extreme embarrassment of smelling like blood. Muscio described her own experience with a grade school sexual education class during which the boys were sent outside to play baseball while the girls watched a video about the "creepy, cootie-laden mystery" of periods. She also attacks companies that produce so-called 'feminine hygiene' products for perpetuating these negative associations and for the high costs of such products. Muscio advocates creating a positive image of menstruation by throwing menarche parties, using moon calendars to familiarize oneself with biological rhythms, and reading Pippi Longstocking, a "superlative role model in the fine science of accepting ourselves." The book also suggests alternatives to pads and tampons, such as sea sponges, and menstrual cups.

Next comes the topic of birth control. Muscio tells the stories of the three abortions she has had during her lifetime: two clinical abortions and one self-induced abortion. The clinical abortions are described as painful, impersonal experiences that are designed by men for women. Self-induced abortion, by means of abortive herbs, abdominal massages, and so forth, is advocated as being highly preferable to clinical abortions. Muscio also discusses how women's birth control methods can be upsetting and even physically harmful, and instead recommends condoms as a primary form of birth control.

Muscio then delves into the history of prostitution, citing the works of activist Carol Queen about the treatment of such women in ancient times, when prostitutes were sacred to some religions. Muscio states the need for women to reclaim 'Whoredom' and work to end the stigma surrounding it.

The Cuntlovin' Guide to the Universe in the back of the book is an index for information on all topics covered in the book.

== Themes ==
The Capital Times observed that the book addresses themes of gender empowerment and self-esteem among women.

== Reception ==
Cunt: A Declaration of Independence was given the 1999 Firecracker Alternative Book Award for Nonfiction. The book was placed at number six on a list of "Best-Selling Lesbian Books" in May 2000 by Curve magazine. The magazine gave the work a positive review and recommended it to their readers. Writing for Curve, Rachel Pepper commented: "Far from a farce, this book takes a look-both serious and playful-at our most private female body parts." She wrote that the book was instructional on the commonalities between women.

off our backs reviewed the book and columnist Michelle Lee wrote: "This book has meant so much to me and has really helped shape who I am as a person and a woman." Lee placed the book within its context as an important work personally and generally to women: "To me, this book is near-sacred, a veritable Bible of independent womanhood for myself and other young feminists." Lee concluded her review by observing: "At so many points in this book, particularly the parts about body image and masturbation, I found myself saying 'Geez, I wish my Mom had told me *that*!' These are often the best points of the book--tidbits of wisdom from an older sister teaching a generation. And then questioning that generation. And making that generation question itself."

Herizons journalist Wendy Barber reviewed the book and called it "a delightful, thought-provoking read about our relationship with our bodies, in particular, our cunts." Barber wrote that Cunt "is one of the best feminist books about the female body" that she had read after Women's Bodies, Women's Wisdom.

The book received a critical review in Publishers Weekly. The review characterized the work as "self-indulgent exercise in feminist reclamation". Publishers Weekly lamented that the book's structural flow was hampered by "rambling digressions" and "jarring prose". The review concluded: "Although this work may constitute a move toward women's acceptance of themselves and their bodies, it is a very small step."

== Impact ==
Inga Muscio received hate mail after the publication of Cunt, and a greater amount of hate mail after her next book Autobiography of a Blue-Eyed Devil: My Life and Times in a Racist Imperialist Society was published.

The book inspired a movement called Cuntfest, a celebration of women, and Cuntfest events were held with multiple artists in different cities in the United States after the book's publication.

By the time the book reached its second edition, it had become an important fixture within the movement of Third-wave feminism. Cunt was required reading as part of a selection of third-wave feminist viewpoints in a course Women's Health Activism about women's health at the University of Virginia.
