= RDG =

RDG, or Rdg, may refer to:

- Rail Delivery Group, a body in the privatised British railway system
- RDG Red Data Girl, fantasy novel series by Noriko Ogiwara
- RDG, the AAR reporting mark for the Reading Company, a defunct US railroad
- RDG, the IATA code for Reading Regional Airport in the state of Pennsylvania, US
- RDG, the National Rail code for Reading railway station in the county of Berkshire, UK
- Reading, in the field of temperature measurement
- Rechtsdienstleistungsgesetz, the German Legal Services Act
- Revolutionary Democratic Group, socialist organisation in the United Kingdom
- Royal Dragoon Guards, the Royal Dragoon Guards is an armoured regiment of the British Army
- Rwanda Development Gateway, a project to set up a national Rwandan portal for information sharing
