= Transparency in Wage Structures Act =

German anti-discrimination law

German Bundestag
- Long title: The Act to promote Transparency in Wage Structures among Women and Men
- Citation: Transparency in Wage Structures Act of 30 June 2017 (Federal Law Gazette I page 2152)
- Territorial extent: Germany
- Enacted by: German Bundestag
- Enacted: 30 June 2017
- Commenced: 6 July 2017
- Status: In force

The Transparency in Wage Structures Act (German: Entgelttransparenzgesetz; EntgTranspG) is a 2017 German law enacted to promote pay parity between men and women. The law was strongly supported by Manuela Schwesig, the Federal Minister of Family Affairs, Senior Citizens, Women and Youth. The law seeks to guarantee equal pay for equal work and provides mechanisms to enforce this, as well as reporting requirements for employers with more than 500 employees.

== Summary ==
The Transparency in Wage Structures Act expressly prohibits direct or indirect discrimination on the grounds of gender with regard to all pay components and pay conditions in the case of equal work or work of equal value (§ 3). In this respect, it supplements the Allgemeines Gleichbehandlungsgesetz (AGG), Germany's general anti-discrimination law, which was enacted in 2006. Various means of enforcing this prohibition are specified in the law.

=== Individual right to information ===
Under the act, employers with more than 200 employees are required to, upon request, explain the basis for the employee's compensation (§§ 10 – 16). The right to lodge these requests went into effect on 6 January 2018.

For employers where a collective bargaining agreement is in effect, employees can request this information from the works council (§ 14); for employers without collective agreements, employees make the request to the employer directly (§ 15). The right to information only exists when there are at least six employees who have comparable duties. In the event of direct or indirect discrimination based on sex, the employer may be required to retroactively pay equal wages.

=== Operational procedures for reviewing and establishing equal pay ===
Private employers with more than 500 employees are encouraged to voluntarily review their compensation structures and the application thereof to ensure equal compensation (§§ 17 – 20).

=== Reporting obligations for employers ===
Any employer that has more than 500 employees and is required to issue regular management reports under the German Commercial Code must produce a report on equality and pay parity. This report should contain the measures taken to promote the equality of women and men, the measures taken to ensure pay parity between women and men, and the results of those measures (§§ 21 - 22). If the employer does not take any measures to ensure pay parity, they must state their reasons for not doing so.

For employers that have or apply a collective bargaining agreement, reports must be produced every five years; all other employers are obligated to issue the report every three years. The report must be included in that period's management report and published in the Bundesanzeiger (§ 22).

=== Practical application ===
There are obstacles to the application of the Transparency in Wage Structures Act in practice. In human resources management, the question of "work equivalence" is defined exclusively on the basis of requirements. This is also indirectly specified by the text of the law, as it prescribes an evaluation that is independent of the employee's performance. As such, a data-driven analysis of the requirements is required. In addition to base compensation, additional forms of compensation (e.g. year-end bonus or company car) can be included. The reference compensation is determined using the median compensation of at least five other employees of the opposite sex.

== Legislative history ==
In the 2013 coalition agreement, the CDU, CSU, and SPD initially agreed on a threshold of 500 employees for the individual right to information about the criteria used to determine compensation. After Manuela Schwesig called for a threshold of 6 employees, the Federal Cabinet settled on a threshold of 200 employees for the individual right to information, but used the previously agreed-upon threshold of 500 employees for employer reporting obligations.

On 30 March 2017, the Bundestag passed the bill with votes in favor from the CDU/CSU and SPD grand coalition, while Alliance 90/The Greens voted against, and The Left abstained.

== Criticism ==
At a public hearing of the Committee on Family Affairs, the German Trade Union Confederation criticized the bill for not providing for collective actions in the case of wage discrimination. The group applauded the introduction of the individual right to information, but noted that women would likely face professional retaliation for taking action alone against their employers. The German Association of Women Lawyers also criticized the planned compensation review process for being voluntary and only applying to employers with more than 500 employees, as actions on a voluntary basis have not produced successful outcomes in the past.

The German Green Party criticized the threshold values of 200/500 employees and called for the law to be applicable for all employers. They further criticized the lack of a mechanism for unions to engage in collective actions. Die Linke criticized that the compensation reviews were not mandatory.

The Confederation of German Employers' Associations criticized the law as being too bureaucratic and that the law misses its target of promoting career opportunities for women.

Alexander Hagelüken and Thomas Öchsner researched the outcomes of the law in May 2018 on behalf of the German newspaper Süddeutsche Zeitung. In companies where pay inquiries were made directly to the employer instead of through a works council, a large number of employees did not make use of their right to information due to fear of retaliation. In general moreover the law had not seen much use. The use of the median, along with the combination of base pay and fringe benefits as a single sum, results in a list where the employer only communicates the value in the middle of the list, which reduces the usefulness of the report. The law only includes a subset of fringe benefits that employers might provide. None of the 20 large companies they contacted stated that they planned any fundamental changes.

== Jurisprudcence ==
In a decision handed down on 21 January 2021, the Federal Labour Court ruled that if a female employee is paid less than the median of male employee in a comparable role, there is a rebuttable presumption under § 22 of the Allgemeines Gleichbehandlungsgesetz that this is due to discrimination.
