= Isabelle Kalihangabo =

Rwandan lawyer and politician

Isabelle Kalihangabo (born 1972) is a Rwandan lawyer and politician who has been justice of the Supreme Court of Rwanda since 2023. She previously served as Deputy Secretary General of the Rwanda Investigation Bureau (RIB) since 2018 until 2023.

== Career ==
Kalihangabo is a law graduate from the University of Rwanda and also has a Master's degree in International Business Law from Queen Mary University of London. Between 2000 and 2004 she served in the Supreme Court of Rwanda in Department of Gacaca Jurisdictions. In 2004 she was appointed as a Judge to the High Court of Rwanda here she served until 2007. In 2007 she was made Assistant Attorney General in the Ministry of Justice with responsibility for legal advisory services. A promotion in March 2014 saw her made Permanent Secretary and Solicitor General in the Ministry of Justice She remained in that role until 9 April 2018 when she was appointed by President as Deputy Secretary General of Rwanda Investigation Bureau.
