= Ministry of Justice (Rwanda) =

Government ministry of Rwanda

- Minisiteri y'Ubutabera; Ministère de la Justice
- Emblem of Rwanda

Agency overview
- Formed: 1961
- Jurisdiction: Government of Rwanda
- Headquarters: Kigali, Rwanda
- Minister responsible: Emmanuel Ugirashebuja, Minister of Justice and Attorney General
- Website: www.minijust.gov.rw

The Ministry of Justice (MINIJUST) is the ministry of the Government of Rwanda in charge of justice. It was created in 1961. Since 2007, it has also included the Office of the Attorney General. The minister is therefore called the Minister of Justice and Attorney General.

The ministry oversees the rule of law, law enforcement and access to justice. Its headquarters are in Kigali. Since September 2021, the minister has been Emmanuel Ugirashebuja.

== History ==
At the ministry during a visit by the UN Special Rapporteur Maina Kìai, January 2014

The ministry dates from January 1961, under the interim government before independence. It has had several names. In November 1965, it became the Ministry of Internal Affairs and Justice. In August 1973, it became the Ministry of Justice and Legal Affairs. In 2000, it was called the Ministry of Justice and Institutional Relations.

On 10 September 2007, Prime Minister's Order 18/03 merged the Office of the Attorney General with the Ministry of Justice.

== Mission ==
The ministry's mission is to organise, oversee and promote activities related to the rule of law, law enforcement and justice for all. It hosts the secretariat of the Justice, Reconciliation, Law and Order Sector (JRLOS). This sector coordinates the justice institutions. Among them are the judiciary, the Rwanda National Police, the Rwanda Investigation Bureau and the National Public Prosecution Authority.

== Ministers ==
- Anastase Makuza (1961–1963, first minister of justice)
- Gaspard Cyimana (1963, interim)
- Callixte Habamenshi (1963–1965)
- Gaspard Harelimana (1966–1969)
- Andre Sebatware (1970–1974)
- Bonaventure Habimana (1974–1978)
- Charles Nkurunziza (1978–1984)
- Jean Marie Vianney Mugemana (1984–1989)
- Theoneste Mujyanama (1990–1991)
- Sylvestre Nsanzimana (1991–1992)
- Stanislas Mbonampeka (1992–1993)
- Agnès Ntamabyaliro Rutagwera (1993–1994, first woman in the post)
- Alphonse-Marie Nkubito (1994–1995)
- Marthe Mukamurenzi (1995–1996)
- Faustin Nteziryayo (1996–1999)
- Jean de Dieu Mucyo (1999–2003)
- Edda Mukabagwiza (2003–2006)
- Tharcisse Karugarama (2006–2013)
- Johnston Busingye (2013–2021)
- Emmanuel Ugirashebuja (since 2021)

== See also ==
- Ministry of justice
- Politics of Rwanda
- Cabinet of Rwanda
