= Domitilla Mukantaganzwa =

Rwandan jurist and judge (born 1964)

President of the Supreme Court of Rwanda and the High Council of the Judiciary
- Incumbent
- Assumed office 12 December 2024
- Deputy: Alphonse Hitiyaremye
- Preceded by: Faustin Ntezilyayo

Personal details
- Born: 11 November 1964, Kimihurura District, Kigali, Rwanda
- Education: National University of Rwanda; Hekima University College; Institute of Legal Practice and Development of Rwanda

Domitilla Mukantaganzwa (born 11 November 1964) is a Rwandan jurist and judge. She has been the second female president of the Supreme Court of Rwanda and the High Council of the Judiciary since 2024.

== Early life and education ==
Mukantaganzwa was born 11 November 1964 in Kimihurura District, Kigali, Rwanda. She completed her studies in economics and obtained a law degree from the National University of Rwanda in 1987. She subsequently went on to gain a Master’s degree in Peace Studies and International Relations at the Institute of Peace Studies and International Relations at Hekima University College in Kenya, and undertook further studies at the Institute of Legal Practice and Development.

== Career ==
In 1987, she became deputy mayor and subsequently worked as a legal adviser at the Ministry of the Interior and Municipal Development and at the Ministry of Agriculture and Livestock. Between 1994 and 1998, Mukantaganzwa became Director-General of the Ministry of Social Affairs and Labour and also served as a director at the UNICEF. She was member of the Constitutional and Legal Affairs Committee in 1999, where he was one of the members of the Commission responsible for drafting the 2003 Constitution.

Mukantaganzwa served as executive secretary of the National Gacaca Courts Service between 2003 and 2012, overseeing trials from the Tutsi genocide. In December 2019 was named president of the Rwanda Law Reform Commission. On 3 December 2024 President of Rwanda Paul Kagame appointed her the new president of the Supreme Court of Rwanda to replace Faustin Ntezilyayo. She was sworn in on 12 December 2024.
