= Jean-Philbert Nsengimana =

Rwandan software engineer and politician

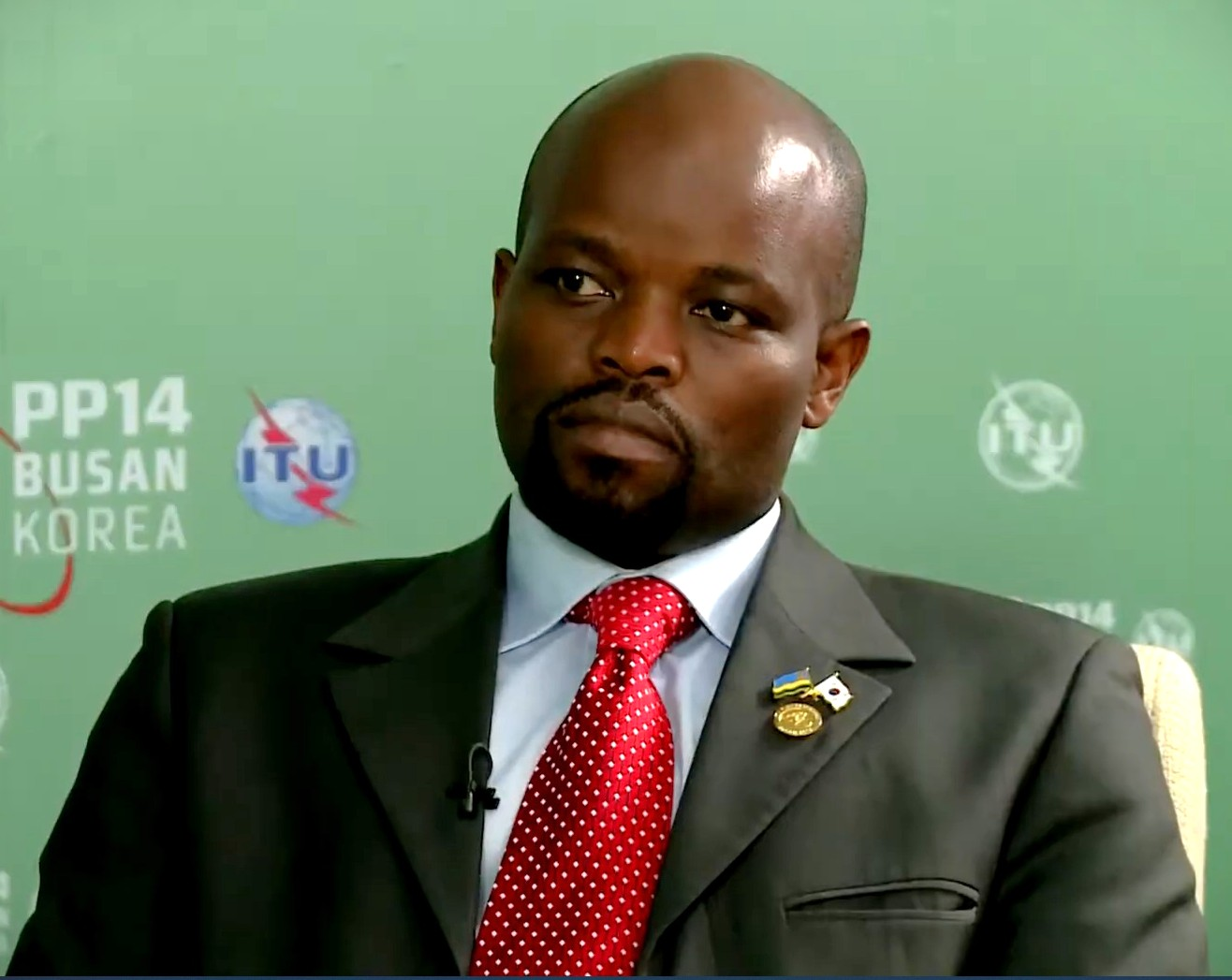
- Nsengimana in 2014
- Born: Rwanda
- Citizenship: Rwandan
- Education: National University of Rwanda (Masters of Information and Communication Technology); S P Jain School of Global Management (Master of Business Administration)
- Occupation: Politician
- Years active: 2003–present
- Known for: Software engineering, politics
- Title: Cabinet Minister of Information and Communications Technology in the Cabinet of Rwanda

Jean-Philbert Nsengimana is a Rwandan software engineer and politician, who has served as the cabinet minister of Information and Communications Technology (ICT), since 31 August 2017. Immediately before his current assignment, from December 2011 until 31 August 2017, he served as the cabinet minister for Youth and ICT. He has maintained that assignment in the various cabinet reshuffles since.

== Background and education ==
Nsengimana has a Masters of Information and Communication Technology, majoring in Software Engineering, awarded by the National University of Rwanda. His Masters in Business Administration, majoring in Information Technology Management, was obtained from the S P Jain School of Global Management. He later received a Master in Public Administration from the Harvard Kennedy School.

== Career ==
From 2003 until 2007, he served as a director of "Rwanda Development Gateway". He also served as a regional coordinator for Africa at the "Development Gateway Foundation", between 2006 and 2008. He then worked as a country director at Voxiva Inc. from 2008 until 2010.

During the six years at the helm of the combined Youth and ICT ministry, Nsengimana has strongly advocated for the role that information technology can play in solving many of the development challenges that face young Africans, and by extension, African governments.

In December 2011, the government of Rwanda combined the Youth ministry with the ICT ministry and Nsengimana was appointed to head the joint docket. In August 2017, the Youth/ICT docket was split and Nsengimana remained as Minister of ICT, while the now new docket of Minister for Youth was assigned to Rosemary Mbabazi.

== Family ==
Jean-Philbert Nsengimana is a married father of three children.

== See also ==
- Cabinet of Rwanda
