= Wintersteiger =

Austrian company

Wintersteiger Holding AG
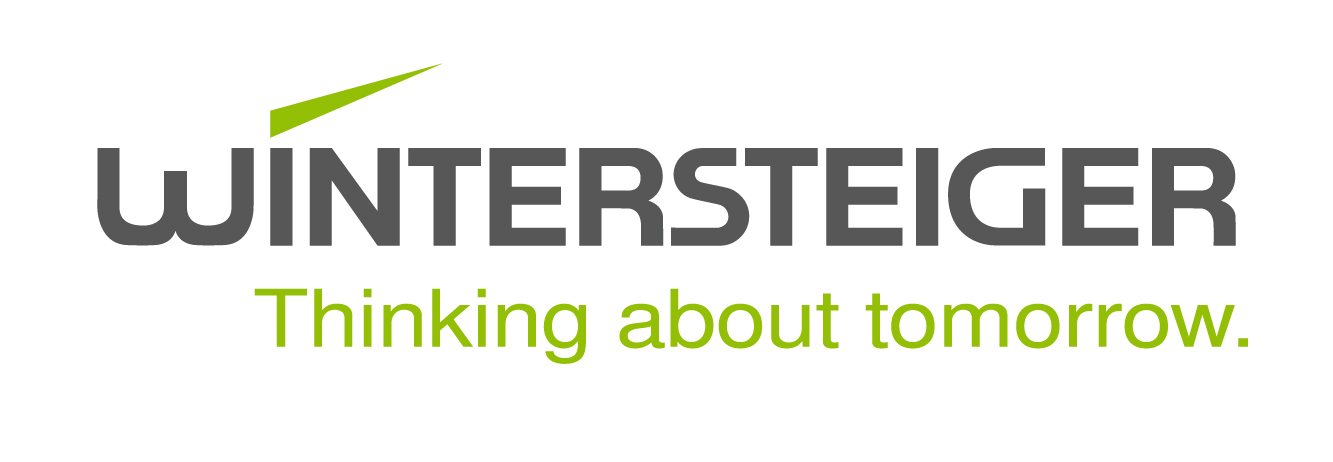
- Type: Joint-stock company
- Founded: 1953
- Headquarters: Ried im Innkreis, Ried im Innkreis District (Upper Austria)
- Key people: Pierre Bilgeri (CEO)
- Products: Mechanical engineering, skiing services
- Revenue: 246.4 million EUR (2023)
- Number of employees: 1,204 (2023)
- Website: www.wintersteiger.com

Wintersteiger Holding AG is an Austrian company based in Ried im Innkreis. The company is active in the development, production and distribution of machinery and equipment for seed cultivation, ski service, wood and metal industries.

== History ==
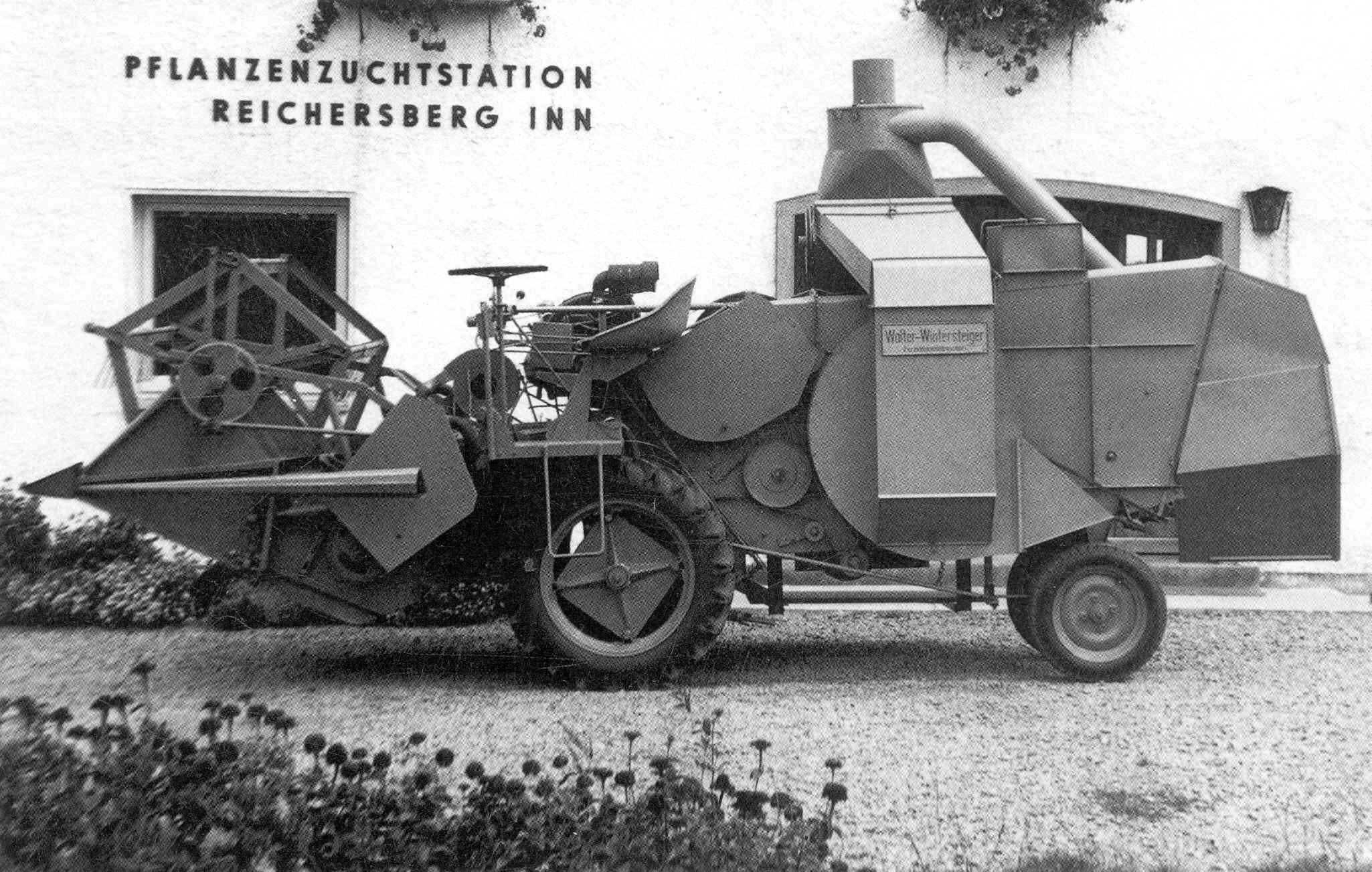
Wintersteiger plot harvester

In 1953, Fritz Walter and Johann Wintersteiger founded the Walter & Wintersteiger locksmith's shop in the old smithy in Obernberg am Inn, Austria. The first products were a seed drill and a laboratory thresher for a seed breeding company. In 1958, the business was relocated to Ried, Austria, where the group's headquarters are still located today.

=== Product expansion 1960s ===
In the 1960s, Wintersteiger introduced the first serial-produced plot harvesters. Further, Wintersteiger began producing ski production machines and ski service machines, including a stone grinding machine for Fischer – the microplan grinder.

=== Reorientation 1970s ===
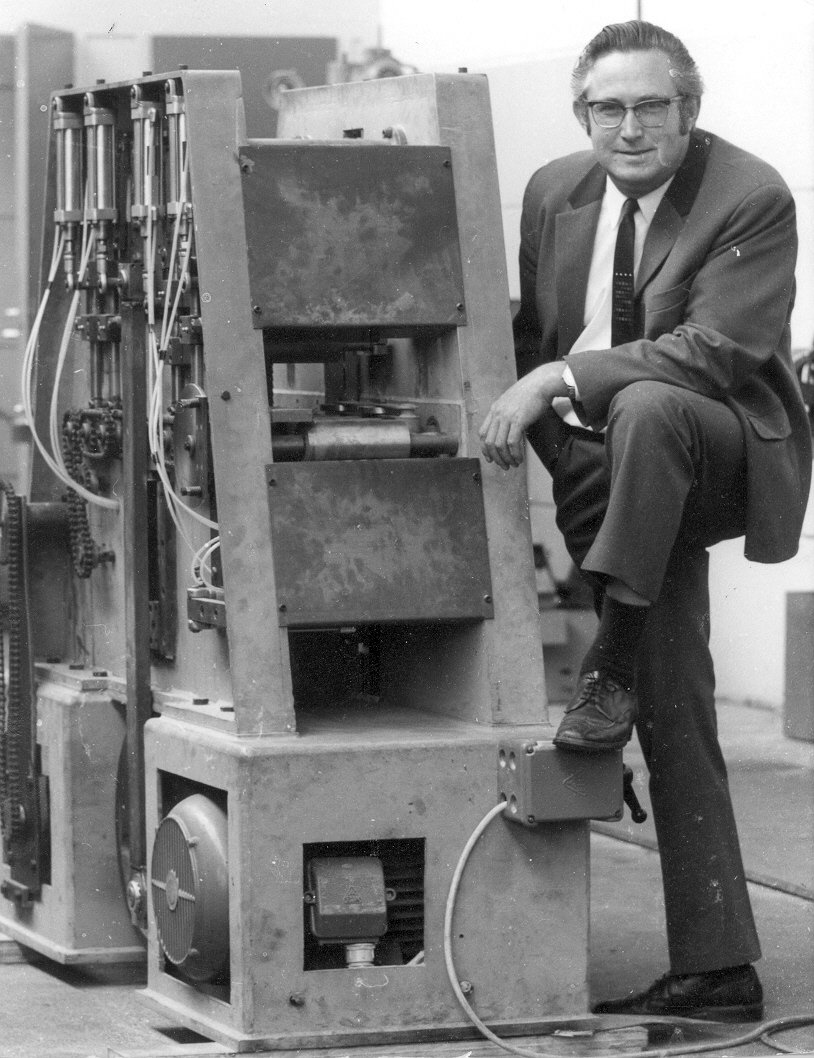
Founder Johann Wintersteiger

In the 1970s, Wintersteiger developed a frame saw for ski production and other grinding machines for base service. At the same time Wintersteiger shifted its focus from ski production machines to ski service machines. In 1976, the company building was extended for the first time.

=== Business expansion 1990s ===
At the ISPO 1996 in Munich Wintersteiger presented two new product lines for ski service machines. The group had also taken over the distribution of the French SKI2 products in Austria, the US and Canada. When the wood processing industry switched from solid wood to multi-layer boards at the end of the 1990s, Wintersteiger’s frame saw was now repurposed for slicing precious woods. Since 1998, Wintersteiger has been the exclusive machinery supplier to the Austrian Ski Association (ÖSV).

=== Acquisitions and production expansion 2000s ===
After Germany, France, the USA and Canada, Wintersteiger established branches in Italy (2000), Switzerland (2002) and Singapore (2004). Furthermore, several companies were acquired around the turn of the millennium: Hege in Germany (1999) and SKID in France (1999), Grindrite in the USA (1999), SKI2 in France (2002) and Banholzer GmbH in Germany (2004). With the acquisition of Hege, Wintersteiger had taken over its largest competitor in the production of sowing and harvesting machines for seed research. This was followed by the establishment of subsidiaries in China (2006), Brazil (2008), and Russia (2008). In 2011, Wintersteiger took over the majority of Kohler Maschinenbau GmbH and thus entered the field of levelling technology. In the same year, Wintersteiger bought the company Bootdoc and took over the majority of VAP Automation GmbH in 2012.

In 2002, Wintersteiger completed its exhibition hall and started the construction of a new production hall. In 2006, new operating buildings followed for the sales and service branches in St. Hélène du Lac, France, and in Salt Lake City, USA. In 2004, Wintersteiger invested in additional production sites for their subsidiary Banholzer, and in 2006, a new saw production plant was built in Arnstadt, Thuringia. In 2014, Kohler changed its location to Lahr, Germany. The newly constructed company building was the largest single investment in the company’s history at around EUR 14 million.

In 2004, Wintersteiger was converted from a GmbH (limited liability company) to an AG (public limited company).

=== Business and product expansion 2010s ===
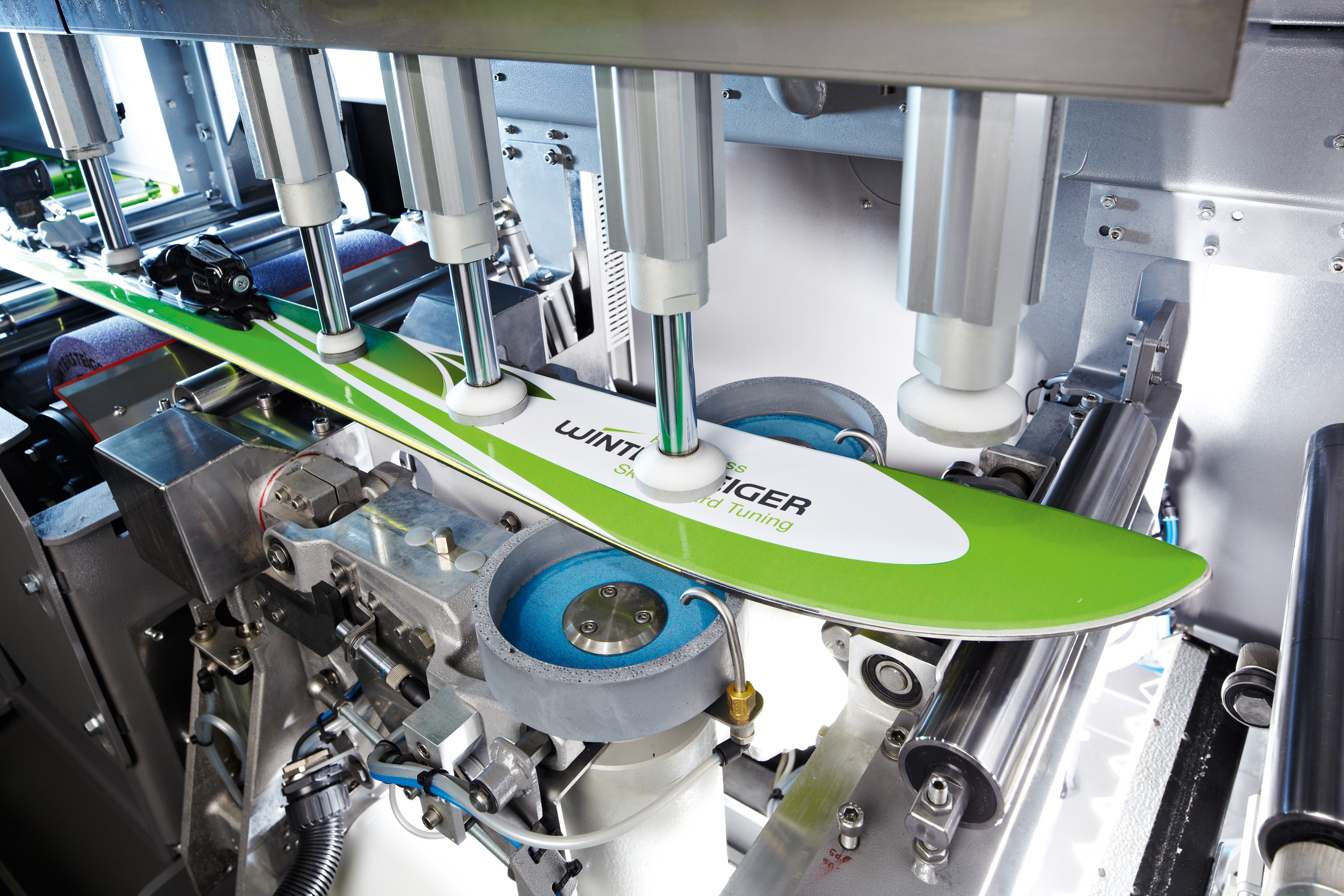
Automatic skiing service

In January 2017, further developments of the existing product series and the new Scout ski service machine were presented at ISPO Munich – a ski service station for skis and snowboards that is used in ski service workshops of various sizes. In 2019, Wintersteiger took over Serra Maschinenbau GmbH. Serra developed machines and saw bands for mobile and stationary sawmills.

=== Business transformation 2020s ===
At the beginning of 2022, the Group acquired a majority stake in the German machine manufacturer Hema, based in Frickenhausen near Stuttgart. In the same year, the decision was made to transform the four business segments into independent companies and combine them into a holding by the end of the year. On 1 July 2023, Wintersteiger AG became Wintersteiger Holding AG and the Ried divisions Sports, Seedmech, Woodtech (now: Solutions) as well as the production entity became independent legal entities (“GmbH”).

As of 1 January 2025, the former Dry & Protect business unit, specializing in drying technology and indoor air disinfection, was transferred from the Sports division to an independent division and legal entity (Wintersteiger Dry & Protect GmbH). At the same time, the majority stake in the US sawmill tool company Union Grove Saw & Knife Inc. based in Union Grove, NC was announced.

== Corporate structure ==
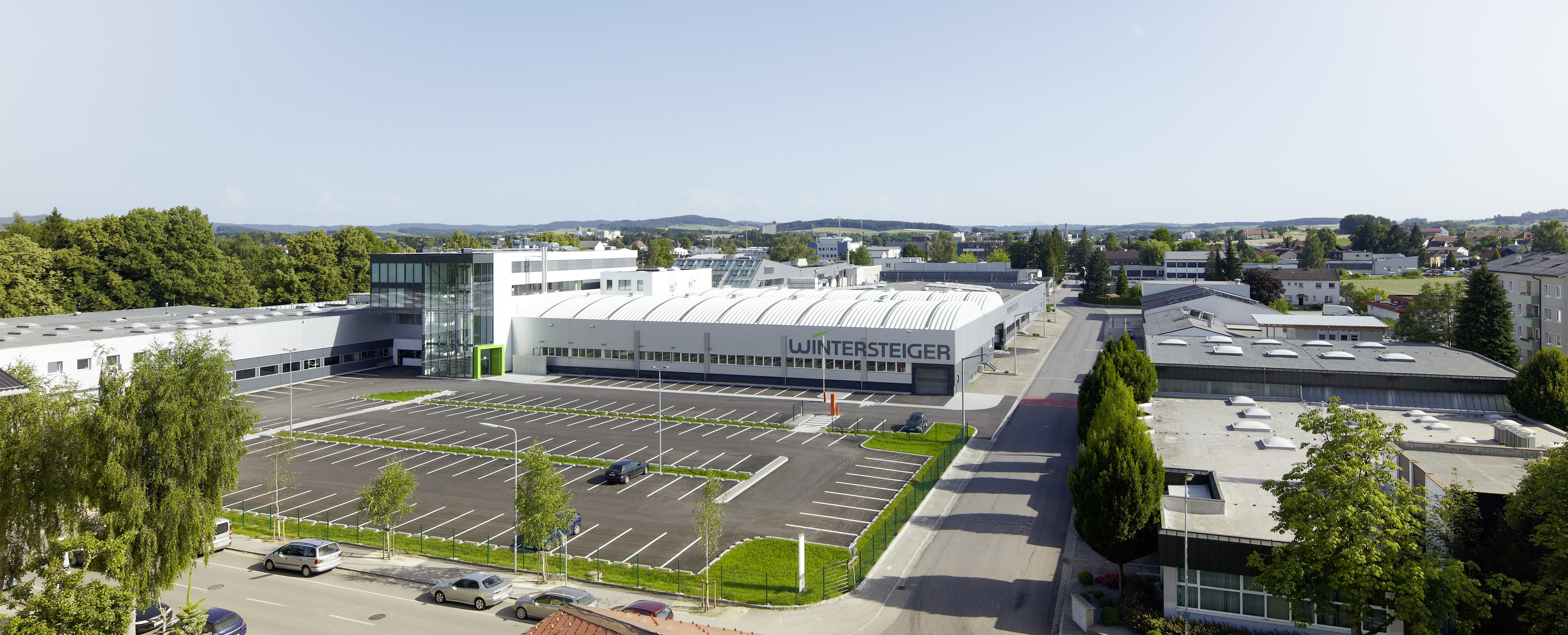
Wintersteiger headquarters in Ried i. Innkreis

The group has its headquarters in Ried im Innkreis, Austria. The executive board is overseen by Pierre Bilgeri. The company is divided into five business segments. The Sports division, among other things, plans and installs service workshops, rental stations, and ski depots. The Seedmech division develops products for seed breeding, including machines, software programmes, equipment for assessment, as well as laboratory technology. The Solutions division manufactures products for the woodworking industry, especially wood thin-cutting products and saw blades, as well as industrial automation. The Dry & Protect division offers products for drying, disinfecting, and deodorizing all kinds of work clothes, gear, and sports goods, as well as room air. The Metals division produces leveling machines for the sheet metal processing industry.

Revenue (in million EUR)
2010	2011	2012	2013	2014	2015	2016	2017	2018	2019	2020	2021	2022	2023
93.4	101.8	126.2	141.9	135.8	143.7	140.6	153.9	160.1	181.7	133.8	167.7	223.1	246.4

Source: Bundesanzeiger

== Patents ==
Wintersteiger holds a variety of patents, among others: in the area of agricultural machinery technology a patented precision precision air seeder, as well as in the area of ski processing, the Trimjet device. It is used for bridge-free grinding for all ski lengths as well as for snowboards and the semi-automatic operating mode.
