= Legal Services Act =

Legal Services Act may refer to:

- Legal Services Act (Germany), a 2008 German federal law
- Legal Services Act 2007, an act of the Parliament of the United Kingdom
