= Faustin Ntezilyayo =

Rwandan jurist

- Born: 20 August 1962 (age 64); Kamonyi, Rwanda
- Citizenship: Rwanda
- Education: University of Antwerp (PhD in Law); Free University of Brussels (Master in Fiscal Law); Carleton University; Master of Arts in International Affairs/International Trade Policy; National University of Rwanda (Bachelor of Laws)
- Occupations: Lawyer, Judge
- Organization: Judiciary Of Rwanda

Faustin Ntezilyayo (born 20 August 1962) is the former chief justice/president of the Supreme Court of Rwanda and president of the High Council of the Judiciary from 6 December 2019 to 3 December 2024 replacing Sam Rugege who ended his term in December 2019.

== Background and education ==
Ntezilyayo was born on 20 August 1962 in the present-day Kamonyi District. He holds a Ph.D. in law from the University of Antwerp (Belgium), a Master of Laws (LLM) in fiscal law from Free University of Brussels (Belgium), a Master of Arts in international affairs (international trade policy), from Carleton University (Canada); and a Bachelor of Laws from the National University of Rwanda.

== Career ==
Ntezilyayo started his career as a lecturer at the Faculty of Law of the National University of Rwanda in 1986. He has been a visiting scholar at Duke University School of Law (USA), 1999 (US); a visiting lecturer at the University of Ottawa (Canada), (2007–2008); and a consultant with the World Bank; the Organisation Internationale de la Francophonie (OIF) and the United Nations Institute for Training and Research (UNITAR). Ntezilyayo served in various positions in the government of Rwanda. He was Minister of Justice from October 1996 to January 1999; vice governor of the National Bank of Rwanda (2000–2003); managing director of the Rwanda Utilities Regulatory Agency (2003–2005); and senior legal advisor in the Ministry of Commerce and Trade (1996). He is also familiar with the private sector, having been the managing director of a microfinance bank (i.e. AGASEKE BANK), (2011–2013) and an arbitration practitioner. Ntezilyayo was a Judge of the East African Court of Justice from April 2013 to March 2020. He was sworn in as Chief Justice of Rwanda on 6 December 2019.

== Other activities ==
- Fellow of the Chartered Institute of Arbitrators (FCIArb)
- Member of the Panel of Conciliators of the World Bank’s International Center for Settlement of Investment Disputes (ICSID)
