= Gerhard Werner =

Gerhard Werner (1921–2012) was a medical doctor and scholar active in research covering areas of pharmacology, psychiatry, cognitive neuroscience, especially neurodynamics, artificial intelligence, and complexity theory. During his career, and continuing after his retirement in 1989, he published just over a hundred scientific papers and held administrative posts in government, academic and corporate institutions.

Werner graduated from the University of Vienna Medical School in 1945, and continued studies in mathematics, theoretical physics, and later Psychoanalysis. He joined the World Health Organization (WHO) and served in Calcutta, India and São Paulo, Brazil. He worked at Cornell Medical College and Johns Hopkins University with Vernon Mountcastle. He was instrumental in introducing the neuropharmacological use of Succinylcholine. Werner became Chairman of the Pharmacology Department, and later Dean of the Medical School, at the University of Pittsburgh.

In 1984, Werner was awarded the Alexander von Humboldt Prize to study temporal signal correlations in the brain in a collaboration with Heribert Reitboeck at Philipps University of Marburg / Germany.

Werner also served in the Veterans Administration (VA) in Pittsburgh, and later was a consultant to Motorola.

As a member of the National Institute of Health (NIH), he was involved in the early development of the prototype for the personal computer during the LINC project. At the University of Pittsburgh, he helped develop an early AI-driven medical expert system – the PROPHET system. He had a long-standing interest in the theoretical grounding of brain-related dynamical systems.

After encountering the constructivist concepts of Humberto Maturana, Werner moved away from representationalism as a way to explain the nature of how brain and mind enable knowledge of reality. Like Walter Freeman and the late Francisco Varela, Werner espoused dynamical systems theory in place of representationalism.

Vision neuroscientist J. Anthony Movshon of New York University credited Werner and Vernon Mountcastle with introducing Alan Turing's statistical approach to making decisions into neuroscience in the 1960s.

Dr. Werner was an adjunct professor with the Department of Biomedical Engineering at the University of Texas at Austin.

Dr. Werner died on March 26, 2012, at the age of 90.

The origin and current use of the concepts of computation, representation and information in Neuroscience are examined and conceptual flaws are identified which vitiate their usefulness for addressing the problem of the neural basis of Cognition and Consciousness. In contrast, a convergence of views is presented to support the characterization of the Nervous System as a complex dynamical system operating in a metastable regime, and capable of evolving to configurations and transitions in phase space with potential relevance for Cognition and Consciousness.

-Perspectives on the Neuroscience of Cognition and Consciousness, Pages 82-95, BioSystems 87, 2007

After a career in medicine and brain science that lasted nearly 70 years, Werner's final solo paper "From brain states to mental phenomena via phase space transitions and renormalization group transformation: proposal of a theory" was published in 2012 in the journal Cognitive Neurodynamics. In 2013, Werner and BJ Mitterauer published an article entitled "Neuromodulatory Systems" in the journal Frontiers in Neural Circuits.
