= Vincent Munyeshyaka =

Rwandan economist and politician

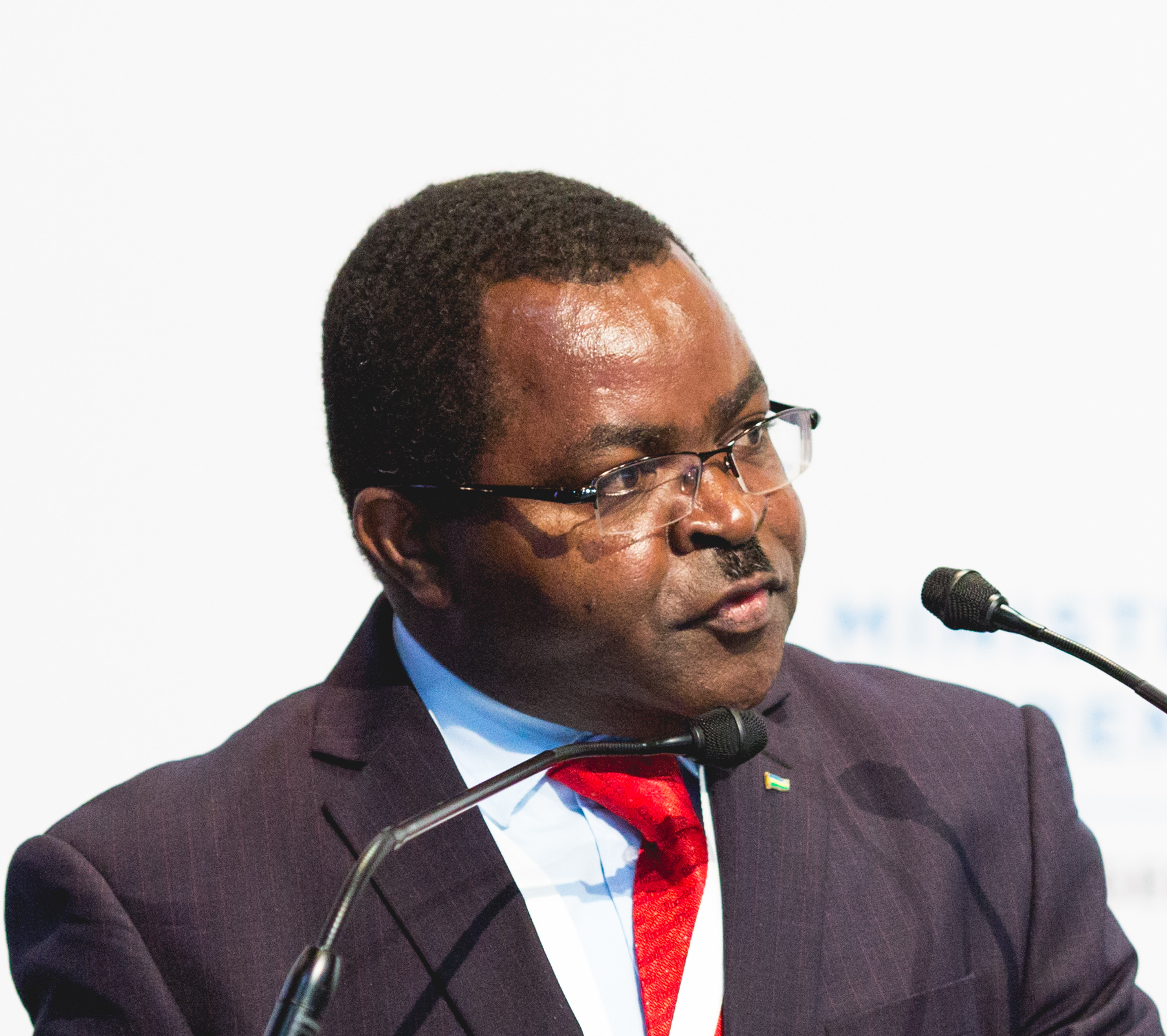
- Vincent Munyeshyaka in December 2017
- Born: Rwanda
- Citizenship: Rwandan
- Education: National University of Rwanda; Paris Technical Institute of Banking
- Occupations: Economist and politician
- Years active: 2000–present
- Known for: Politics
- Title: Cabinet Minister of Trade, Industry and East African Community Affairs in the Cabinet of Rwanda and later the Chief Executive Officer (CEO) of Business Development Fund (BDF)

Vincent Munyeshyaka is an economist and politician in Rwanda, who has served as the cabinet minister of Trade and Industry in the Rwandan cabinet since 31 August 2017.

== Background and education ==
He was born in Rwanda and attended local Rwandan schools for his pre-university education. He attended the National University of Rwanda, graduating with Bachelor of Arts in International Economics. He also has a Post-graduate Diploma in Banking ("Diplome d'Etudes Superieures"), obtained from the Technical Institute of Banking (Institut Technique de Banque), in Paris, France.

== Career ==
Munyeshyaka has served in the Rwandan government in the past. Immediately prior to his current assignment, he was the Minister of State responsible for Socio-Economic Development in the ministry of Local Government (Minaloc), from 7 October 2016, until 31 August 2017.

His past assignments include (a) as the head of the Financial Market Development Section at National Bank of Rwanda, the country's Central Bank and national banking regulator, (b) as the Director of the Corporate Planning Unit in the Ministry of Finance and Economic Planning, (c) as the Coordinator of the Financial Sector Development Secretariat, and (d) as the Permanent Secretary in the Rwanda Ministry of Local Government, from 10 September 2012, until 7 October 2016

In August 2017, the government of Rwanda, split the ministry of Trade, Industry and East African Community Affairs, (Mineacom), and relocated the East African Community Affairs section to the Ministry of Foreign Affairs. What remained is the Ministry of Trade and Industry (Minicom), of which Vincent Munyeshyaka is the incumbent cabinet minister.

== See also ==
- East African Community
- Cabinet of Rwanda
