= Georges-Henri Lévesque =

Canadian priest and sociologist (1903–2000)

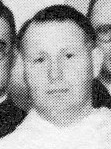
- Georges-Henri Lévesque (1938)
- Born: February 16, 1903; Roberval, Quebec, Canada
- Died: January 15, 2000 (aged 96); Quebec City, Quebec, Canada
- Occupations: Priest and sociologist
- Known for: Founder of National University of Rwanda

Georges-Henri Lévesque CC OQ (February 16, 1903 – January 15, 2000) was a Canadian Dominican priest and sociologist and a liberal figure during the conservative Duplessis era in Quebec.

== Biography ==
Born in Roberval, Quebec, the son of Georges Lévesque and Laura Richard, he was ordained into the priesthood in 1928. He studied philosophy and theology at the Dominican College in Ottawa and social sciences at the School of Social Sciences of the Université Catholique de Lille (France).

Lévesque was a professor at the Faculty of Social Sciences of Université de Montréal from 1935 until 1938 and a professor of social philosophy at Laval University from 1936 until 1962.

In 1938, Lévesque founded the School of Social, Political and Economic Sciences of Laval University and was its first director from 1938 until 1943. The school became the Faculty of Social Sciences in 1943, and he was its first dean, from 1943 until 1955.

Lévesque founded the Quebec Superior Council of Cooperation and was its first president, from 1939 until 1944. He founded the periodical Ensemble! and was its director, from 1939 until 1944. He was a member of the Royal Commission on National Development in the Arts, Letters and Sciences in Canada (1949–1951). He was vice-president of the Canada Council for the Arts (1957–1962). He represented Canada at several international events. In 1963, he founded the National University of Rwanda and he was its first president, from 1963 until 1971.

Lévesque supported the co-operative movement and, through his faculty, helped create new social welfare bodies such as the Conseil supérieur de la coopération and the Société d'éducation des adultes, and to modernize Québec's church-controlled social welfare organizations. As well, his Faculty of Social Science trained a generation of union organizers. His liberal and social democratic ideas and work brought him into constant conflict with the government of Premier Maurice Duplessis and he is seen as one of the fathers of the Quiet Revolution that transformed Quebec society after Duplessis's death.

In 1955, Prime Minister Louis St. Laurent approached Lévesque about naming him to the Senate of Canada as a non-partisan appointee. Lévesque agreed and the Dominican Order gave its permission but the appointment was vetoed by Archbishop Maurice Roy due to concerns that allowing a priest to accept a political appointment could potentially embarrass the Church.

== Honours ==
- He was the 1983 recipient of the Pearson Medal of Peace for his work in peacekeeping.
- In 1967 he was made an officer of the Order of Canada and was promoted to companion in 1979.
- In 1985 he was made an officer of the National Order of Quebec.
- He received honorary doctorates from fourteen universities.
- A sculpted bust of him was erected on the grounds of Laval University in 2002.
