= Emmanuel Ugirashebuja =

Rwandan jurist

Emmanuel Ugirashebuja is the Minister of Justice and Attorney General of the Republic of Rwanda. He is a former President of the East African Court of Justice. He is a Dean Emeritus of the National University of Rwanda, Faculty of Law and has given lectures on diverse subjects of law to various well-renowned Universities worldwide. He was educated and has practiced in the major legal systems, namely, common law and civil law systems.

In addition, he has been bestowed confidence by his peers by being elected to different judicial and legal bodies, notably; the Global Judicial Institute on the Environment, supported by the UNEP and IUCN; He is also a member of the Governing Board of the International Association of Law Schools.

He was Awarded a Lifetime Appointment as a Distinguished Fellow & Eminent Jurist at Jindal Global Law School, OP, Jindal Global University India as “exemplar jurist and contribution of law and Justice which have transcended geographical boundaries and jurisdictional limitation”; the 2019 Bright International- Jurist- in Residence University of Hawai’i School of Law.

Dr. Ugirashebuja holds a PhD and LLM awarded by the University of Edinburgh and a Bachelor’s Degree awarded by the National University of Rwanda (Currently, University of Rwanda).
