= Heribert Reitböck =

Austrian neuroscientist (1933–2014)

Heribert J. P. Reitböck (June 22, 1933 – April 3, 2014) was an Austrian neuroscientist and professor at Philipps-University Marburg.

Reitböck was appointed University Professor at Philipps-University Marburg in 1978 as successor of Hans Wolter. He established the Biophysics / Neurophysics research group there, and perfected a multi-micro-electrode recording technique he had developed in a collaboration between the Westinghouse Electric (1886) Research Laboratories and the University of Pittsburgh. With that technique, object-related synchronizations in the visual system were discovered in 1989. Based on that principle he developed concepts and models for figure-ground separation and object recognition in computer vision.

Flexible neural couplings via synchronizations became an important branch in brain research for a better understanding of the neural mechanisms underlying associative processes. Reitböck is considered a pioneer in that field Reinard Eckhorn: Flexible Kopplungen im Gehirn. Zum 70. Geburtstag des Neurophysikers Professor Heribert J.P. Reitböck.

== Life and work ==
Reitböck was born in Ried im Innkreis. He studied Information Technology at the Technical University of Vienna and earned a master's degree with a thesis in cybernetics mentored by Heinz Zemanek. With a subsequent Research Scholarship of the German Academic Research Program he was appointed to the Max Planck Institute for Biophysics in Frankfurt (Germany) where he worked on his Ph.D. thesis (development of an ultra-sensitive Electron spin resonance spectrometer for the study of radiation induced free radicals in biological substances), mentored by Boris Rajewsky, and studied Physics and Biophysics at the University Frankfurt. In 1963, he got his Ph.D. in Physics / Biophysics from the University Frankfurt, and in 1964 he got his Ph.D. in Electrical Engineering / Information Technology from the Technical University Vienna.

In 1966, Reitböck joined the Westinghouse Research Laboratories as a Senior Scientist (later as an Advisory and Fellow Scientist and was appointed member of the Westinghouse Research Senate). In his research he was working in computer vision, speech recognition, and Associative memory technology. He, also, discovered a new translation-invariant transform. During his time at Westinghouse he accepted an appointment as an Adjunct assistant professor with the School of Medicine of the University of Pittsburgh, and in collaborations with Gerhard Werner and with W.M. Kozak (Biotechnology Department, Carnegie Mellon University) he learned neurophysiological experimental techniques, and how concepts of information processing in the vertebrate brain could be used in technical systems.

In 1978, Reitböck was appointed University Professor at Philipps University of Marburg, establishing and heading a Biophysics / Neurophysics Research Group.

Reitböck is author of about one hundert scientific papers, book chapters, conference contributions, and of 6 US patents. His fiber electrodes and multi electrode recording technique were made commercially available by one of his former technicians. The technique is used in neurophysiological labs all over the world and it found many clinical applications.
