= German Free Software License =

Open-source software license

- Author: ifrOSS
- Latest version: 1.0
- Publisher: Ministry of Science and Research, State of North Rhine-Westphalia
- Published: 2004
- SPDX identifier: D-FSL-1.0
- FSF approved: Yes
- OSI approved: No
- GPL compatible: Yes - GPLv2
- Copyleft: Yes

The German Free Software License (Deutsche Freie Software Lizenz) is a license of open-source nature with the same flavors as the GNU GPL but governed by German law. This makes the license easily acceptable to German authorities. The D-FSL is available in German and in English. Both versions are equally binding.

German court ruled in 2006 that the GNU GPL was indeed enforceable.
