= Alice Rwema =

- Born: Rwanda
- Citizenship: Rwandan
- Education: National University of Rwanda (Bachelor of Laws); University of Rwanda (Master of Laws)
- Occupations: Lawyer and civil servant
- Years active: 2009 — present
- Known for: Law
- Title: Vice chairperson and company secretary of Rwanda Energy Group

Alice Rwema is a lawyer and civil servant in Rwanda who, since August 2014, has been the vice chairperson of the board of directors at Rwanda Energy Group (REG), a parastatal company responsible for energy generation, procurement, distribution and export. Since May 2017, she has also been the company secretary of REG.

== Background and education ==
She attended the National University of Rwanda from which she graduated with a Bachelor of Laws degree in 2009. In 2014, she graduated with a Master of Laws, specialising in international business, tax and trade law, from the University of Rwanda. In 2013, she was seconded to the multinational law firm of Ashurst LLP for three months, sponsored by International Lawyers for Africa, a United Kingdom-based international training programme for African attorneys.

== Career ==
Rwema worked as a legal adviser to the Rwanda Ministry of Infrastructure (Mininfra) from May 2009 until 2013. From 2013 until April 2017, she was a transaction adviser to the state minister responsible for energy and water in the ministry, currently Germaine Kamayirese.

In August 2014, she was appointed as vice chairperson of the Rwanda Energy Group Limited, a holding company for the government-owned Energy Utility Corporation Limited and Energy Development Company Limited. Since May 2017, she has been the company secretary of Rwanda Energy Group. Previously, she was a board member for the Energy Water and Sanitation Authority.

== Other considerations ==
Due to her expertise in contract and business law, she was legal adviser to the government of Rwanda during the procurement of a contractor to construct Bugesera International Airport, currently under construction. She is also a "contributor" to Regulatory Indicators for Sustainable Energy, a World Bank-affiliated organisation that serves as a reference for sustainable energy development internationally. Rwemba is fluent in Kinyarwanda, Swahili, English and French.

== See also ==
- Energy in Rwanda
- Cabinet of Rwanda
