= Neuhofen im Innkreis =

- Municipality
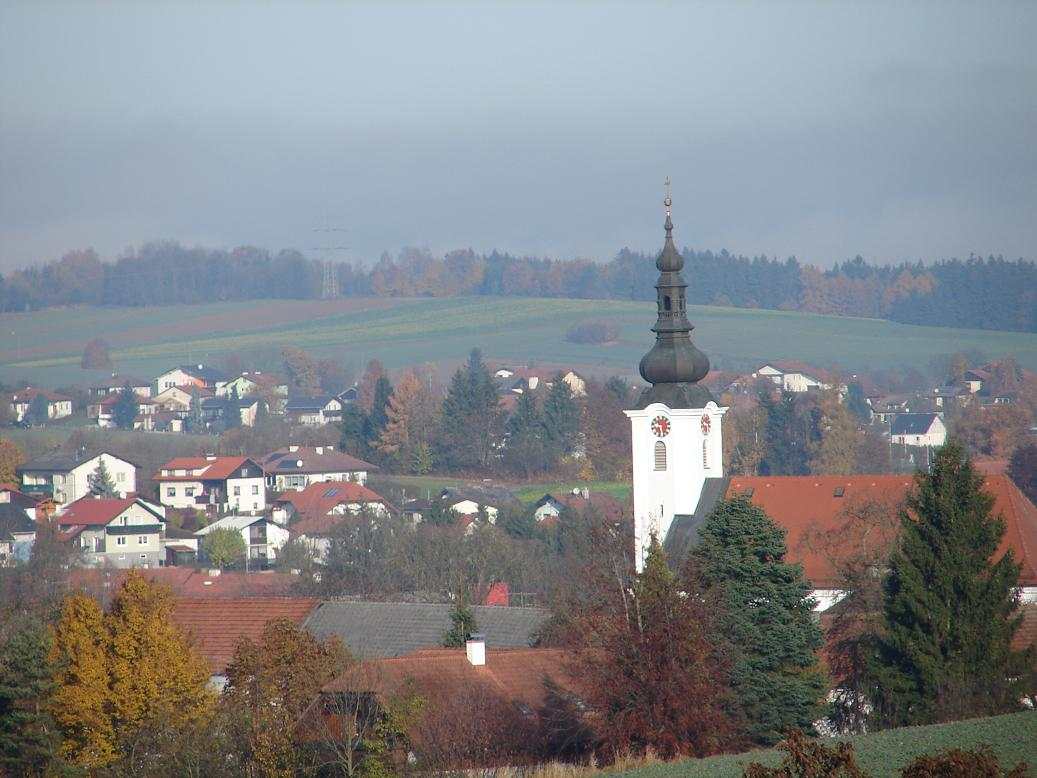

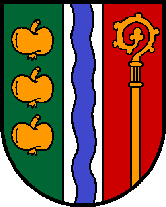
- Coat of arms

- Location within Austria
- Coordinates: 48°11′N 13°28′E
- Country: Austria
- State: Upper Austria
- District: Ried im Innkreis

Government
  - Mayor: Grünseis Andreas

Area
  - Total: 15.59 km^{2} (6.02 sq mi)
- Elevation: 464 m (1,522 ft)

Population (2018-01-01)
  - Total: 2,408
  - Density: 154.5/km^{2} (400.0/sq mi)
- Time zone: UTC+1 (CET)
  - Summer (DST): UTC+2 (CEST)
- Postal code: 4912
- Area code: +43 7752
- Website: www.neuhofen-innkreis.ooe.gv.at

Neuhofen im Innkreis is a municipality in Upper Austria in the district of Ried im Innkreis.

== Geography ==
Neuhofen im Innkreis is situated 464 m above sea level. Its dimensions are 7.1 km from the north to the south and 3.9 km from the west to the east. The total area accounts for 15.7 km^{2}. 10.2% of the land is forested, 79% is used agriculturally. Parts of the municipality are Auleiten, Baumbach, Baumgarten, Bergetsedt, Gobrechtsham, Grillnau, Hörzing, Hauping, Holzleiten, Langstraß, Leinberg, Neuhofen im Innkreis, Niederbrunn, Ponneredt, Rödt, Rettenbrunn, Spießberg, and Wiesen.

== Coat of arms ==
The official description of the coat of arms (translation): From Green to Red, separated by a silver pile, which is decorated with a blue wavy pile; to the left are three golden apples; to the right is a golden crozier, which comes out of the lower frame of the shield. The municipal colours are green, yellow, red.

== History ==
From the foundation of the Bavarian dukedom the city belonged to Bavaria until 1780. Together with the Innviertel (former known as "Innbaiern") it was ceded to Austria after the Treaty of Teschen. During the French Revolutionary Wars it became Bavarian again, in 1814 it became part of Upper Austria to whom it has belonged up to the present day. After the Anschluß to the German Reich on 13 March 1938 the city was part of the "Gau Oberdonau". After 1945 the restitution of Upper Austria took place.

== Politics ==
The current mayor is Grünseis Andreas (ÖVP).

=== Population ===
Historical population
Year	Pop.	±%
1880	1,063	—
1890	977	−8.1%
1900	959	−1.8%
1910	1,089	+13.6%
1923	1,060	−2.7%
1934	1,130	+6.6%
1951	1,172	+3.7%
1961	1,116	−4.8%
1971	1,322	+18.5%
1981	1,498	+13.3%
1991	1,796	+19.9%
1999	2,120	+18.0%
2001	2,131	+0.5%
