= Günter Voglmayr =

Austrian flutist (1968–2012)

Günter Voglmayr (21 February 1968 – 11 January 2012) was an Austrian classical flutist.

== Life ==
Born in Ried im Innkreis, Voglmayr got his first flute lessons at the age of 8, from 1978 with Helmut Trawöger at the Landesmusikschule Grieskirchen and 4 years later he studied with Wolfgang Schulz at the University of Music and Performing Arts Vienna.

Voglmayr was a prizewinner at the national competition Prima la musica and a participant in the Eurovision competition Eurovision Young Musicians in Copenhagen.

In 1987 he was first flutist of the Gustav Mahler Jugendorchester under Claudio Abbado and Franz Welser-Möst as well as with the stage orchestra of the Austrian Federal Theatres. In 1993 Voglmayr took up the position of flautist at the Vienna State Opera. In 1996 he became a member of the Vienna Philharmonic as successor to Herbert Reznicek.

As a chamber musician, Voglmayr has played in various ensembles such as the Vienna Chamber Orchestra and the Zurich Chamber Orchestra, the Wiener Kammerphilharmonie and the Stockholm Sinfonietta.

He was founder and until 2004 director of the Burg Rappottenstein festival.

== Discography ==
- 2010: Dedicated to Piccolo. Günter Voglmayr (piccolo), Stefan Mendl (clavier), Camerata Records.
- 2012: Neue Musik für Flöte und Blasorchester. Günter Voglmayr (flute), SBO Ried – Sinfonietta, Karl Geroldinger (conductor), ORF Ö1 CD.
