= Mandatory labelling =

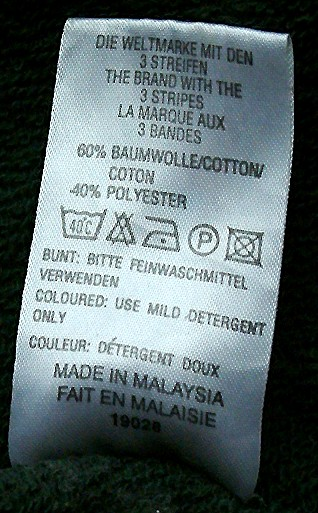
The German Textile Labelling Act requires manufacturers and retailers to declare the constituent materials of clothing. The garment in question contains 60% cotton and 40% polyester.

Mandatory labelling or labeling (see spelling differences) is the requirement of consumer products to state their ingredients or components. This is done to protect people with allergies, and so that people can practice moral purchasing. Mandatory labelling is mandated in most developed nations and increasingly also in developing nations, especially for food products, e.g. "Grade A" meats. With regard to food and drugs, mandatory labelling has been a major battleground between consumer advocates and corporations since the late 19th century.

Because of past scandals involving deceptive labelling, countries like the United States and Canada require most processed foods to have a nutrition facts label on the label, and the table's formatting and content must conform to strict guidelines. The European Union equivalent is the slightly different nutrition information table, which may also be supplemented with standardized icons indicating the presence of allergens. In China, all clothing is labelled with the factory of origin, including telephone and fax numbers, although this information is not available to buyers outside China, who see only a generic Made in China tag. In Brazil, food containing more than one percent of GM ingredients must be labelled as such.

The development of genetically modified food has led to one of the most persistent and divisive debates about mandatory labelling, which is one of the central topics in genetically modified food controversies. Advocates of such labelling claim that the consumer should make the choice whether to expose themselves to any possible health risk from consuming such foods. Detractors point to studies that conclude genetically modified food is safe, and point out that for many commodity products, the identity of the grower and the custody chain are not known.

Voluntary labelling and co-marketing of products deemed desirable is another matter usually carried out by entirely different means, e.g. Slow Food. There has been increased regulatory interest in substantiating these claims, and in some jurisdictions, food labels require regulatory approval before use. An interesting halfway is those labels that are considered mandatory by one buying population and effectively preclude purchase if they are not there, e.g. kosher, vegan, and the aforementioned GMO-free label now seen on many organic products.

Areas in which mandatory labelling is being discussed include:

- genetically modified food—see genetically modified food controversies
- spraying of meat with bacteriophages
- in the United States, fresh meat was added to the list of products which require mandatory country of origin labels (mCOOL) in 2002, however this was the subject of a challenge in the World Trade Organization by Canada, which Canada won in 2011

== See also ==
- Ecolabel
- Label
- List of food labeling regulations
- Packaging and labeling
