= Aloysie Cyanzayire =

Rwandan judge

Aloysie Cyanzayire is a Rwandan lawyer, judge, public servant. She is currently serving as justice of the Supreme Court of Rwanda since August 2018 and was its first female president between 2003 and 2011.

== Personal life ==
Born on February 11, 1964, Cyanzayire grew up in the Ruhango District in the Southern Province of Rwanda, as the oldest in a Christian family of eight whose parents worked as farmers. She has expressed herself as a person of faith publicly since.

== Education ==
She attended one of Rwanda’s first science schools created solely for girls, where she obtained a scientific educational background. She received a BA in law from the National University of Rwanda, graduating in 1989, before being appointed Judge of the Court of First Instance where she served for one year. She then returned to education for two more academic years, from 1991 to 1993, at the International Section of the National School of Magistrates in Paris.

== Career and achievements ==
During the 1994 Rwandan Civil War, she served as a judge in the Southern Province city of Butare. Following the cessation of the conflict, Cyanzayire took care of three orphans, two of whom were the children of her brother-in-law who had been killed during the genocide.

From 1995 to 2000 she served in a number of roles in the Ministry of Justice, first as Director of Public Prosecutions and Relations with the Judicial Services, then as Director of Legal Drafting, and finally as Secretary-General of the Ministry. She also acted as an adviser to the state broadcaster, Office Rwandais d’Information.

In 2000, she was elected by the Rwandan parliament to head the local-level system of postgenocide reconciliation courts, receiving 44 votes out of 52, with her opponent, Jean-Marie Vianney Rusaku, receiving three votes.

That same year she was appointed as one of six Deputy Chief Justices of the Supreme Court, during which time she turned to work pertaining to post-war conciliation. Cyanzayire played a seminal role in establishing the post-genocide reconciliation courts, or Gacaca courts, modelled on traditional Rwandan judicial procedures, which were encouraged as both a means to relieve the caseload burden on the judiciary and promote communal healing. In a speech at the National Summit of Unity and Reconciliation in 2002, she highlighted the work of church leaders visiting detainees in prison, seeking to encourage religious organizations to assist in the state-led efforts to rally support for the Gacaca court.

In December 2003, she was elected by the Rwandan senate to be the fifth president and first female president of the Supreme Court of Rwanda, where she served a full eight-year term from 2004 until 2012. During this time, she also served as the chairperson of the High Council of the Judiciary. In 2014, she replaced Tito Rutaremara as Chief Ombudsman, taking on a position she would hold until 2017. In 2018, the cabinet voted to reappoint her as Supreme Court justice for a second time; a position which she still holds today in 2022.

== Causes and contributions ==
Cyanzariye has been recognised for her contributions to the field of law and public service. Among the areas of recognition has been her work against corruption for which she won an Appreciation Award by the East African Association of Anti-Corruption Authorities. It was during her tenure as Chief Ombudsman that she gained a reputation for anti-corruption campaigning, playing a central role in Rwanda's "Anti-Corruption Week" in 2017, delivering a speech that called on young people to be taught the integrity of fighting malpractices. That same year, Cyanzayire had appealed for a specially designated court or special desk within the Rwandan legal system to be deal with corruption cases.

Over the years, Cyanzire has also used her platform to encourage state officials and public servants to promote gender, and at the same time noted that men’s rights should also be protected saying that "[w]hat we are targeting is a totally balanced society". In 2011, she received a Recognition Certificate by the Women Leaders Network in collaboration with the Ministry of Gender and Family Promotion, during an event in which Rwanda’s First Lady, Jeannette Kagame, gave a keynote address. Together with her good friend from law school at the National University of Rwanda, the Rwandan diplomat and politician, Solina Nyirahabimana, Cyanzayire played a significant role in encouraging women to join the Rwandan judiciary, particularly during her tenure as chairperson of the High Council of the Judiciary when she was in a good position to recruit women judges.

== See also ==
- Supreme Court of Rwanda
- Solina Nyirahabimana
- Gacaca courts
