= Hohenzell =

- Municipality
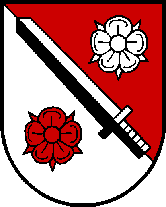
- Coat of arms

- Location within Austria
- Coordinates: 48°11′39″N 13°32′40″E
- Country: Austria
- State: Upper Austria
- District: Ried im Innkreis

Government
  - Mayor: Thomas Priewasser (ÖVP)

Area
  - Total: 22.53 km^{2} (8.70 sq mi)
- Elevation: 478 m (1,568 ft)

Population (2018-01-01)
  - Total: 2,246
  - Density: 99.69/km^{2} (258.2/sq mi)
- Time zone: UTC+1 (CET)
  - Summer (DST): UTC+2 (CEST)
- Postal code: A-4921
- Area code: +43 7752
- Website: www.hohenzell.at

Hohenzell is a municipality in Upper Austria. It is situated in the district of Ried im Innkreis in the Innviertel and has 2,002 inhabitants. The responsible jurisdiction is Ried im Innkreis.

== Geography ==
Hohenzell is situated 478 m above sea level in the Innviertel. Its dimensions are 6.8 km from the North to the South and 5.7 km from the West to the East. The complete area accounts for 22.6 km^{2}. 10.2% of the land is afforested, 80.1% is used agriculturally. Parts of the municipality are Aching, Aschbrechting, Breiningsham, Breitsach, Dürnberg, Emprechting, Engersdorf, Ficht, Gadering, Gonetsreith, Hilprechting, Hohenzell, Kager, Langstadl, Leisen, Mauler, Oberham, Oberlemberg, Obermauer, Plöck, Ponner, Roith, Wöging, Wötzling, Wanger, and Willmerting.

== Coat of arms ==
The official description of the coat of arms (translation): From Red to Silver diagonally separated, with two heraldic roses in complementary colours; on the separating line a sword, which is silver at the top and black at the bottom. The municipal colours are green and white.

== History ==
From the foundation of the Bavarian dukedom the city belonged to Bavaria until 1779. Together with the Innviertel (former known as "Innbaiern") it was ceded to Austria after the Treaty of Teschen. During the French Revolutionary Wars it became Bavarian again, then in 1814 it became part of Upper Austria to whom it has belonged up to the present day. After the Anschluß to the German Reich on 13 March 1938 the city was part of the "Gau Oberdonau". After 1945 the restitution of Upper Austria took place.

== Politics ==
Since September 2015 Thomas Priewasser (ÖVP) has been the mayor and Mag. Thomas Fischer (ÖVP) the vice mayor.

== Population ==
According to the census of 1991 the municipality had 1,870 inhabitants, and 2,002 inhabitants in 2001.
