= Canadian cultural protectionism =

Efforts of Canada to limit the effect of foreign culture

Cultural protectionism in Canada has, since the mid-20th century, taken the form of conscious, interventionist attempts on the part of various governments of Canada to promote Canadian cultural production and limit the effect of foreign culture on the domestic audience. Sharing a large border and a common language with the United States, Canadian politicians have perceived the need to preserve and support a culture separate from US-based North American culture in the globalized media arena. Canada's efforts to maintain its cultural differences from the US and Mexico have been balanced by countermeasures in trade arrangements, including the General Agreement on Tariffs and Trade (GATT) and the North American Free Trade Agreement (NAFTA).

== History ==
=== Government sponsorship ===
One of the first such responses to perceived American cultural invasion in the later half of the 20th century was through the Canadian National Film Act of 1950, which increased the authority of the government's National Film Board to finance and promote Canadian culture.

The Royal Commission on National Development in the Arts, Letters and Sciences, also known as the Massey Commission, was released in 1951. It advocated the creation of a government sponsored organization that would exclusively finance Canadian artists. This organization, the Canada Council for the Arts, is responsible for the distribution of large sums of money to individuals or groups that promote what it defines as Canadian culture. The council had a greater impact than its parent, and continues to support emerging Canadian cultural talent that it approves of. The commission also works to foster a general sense that Canada risks being swamped by an invasion of foreign culture. This coincided with an increased fear that Canada might very well lose a distinct, national culture.

=== Quota system ===
In 1955, with this fear in mind, the government appointed Robert Fowler to chair a royal commission that is known as the Fowler Commission. The Fowler Commission reported that the majority of Canadian stations, including the Canadian Broadcasting Corporation, used not Canadian material, but American. It was the commission's belief that a quota system should be enacted to protect Canadian content on the airwaves.

This recommendation, passed in 1956, affirmed the CBC as Canada's official broadcasting station and initiated the quota system. In its inception, the quota system said that 45% of all content broadcast on the airwaves must be Canadian in origin. While this number has fluctuated over the years, it has generally required that approximately half of all programming on Canadian airwaves be Canadian in origin. However, Canadian content includes not only arts and drama, but news and sports, and most private broadcast networks skew towards the latter rather than the former, to allow for large quantities of foreign dramas. To the dismay of many Canadians, this leaves more "culturally" oriented Canadian programming off the major-network airwaves.

=== Tax incentives ===
Cultural protectionism by the Canadian government gave preference through tax rebates and lower postal rates to magazines published and printed in Canada. This limited the options of American publishing companies to sell magazines in Canada. Some, specifically Reader's Digest and Time magazines, got around the restrictions by publishing "split runs", that is, printing "Canadian editions" of American magazines, rather than publishing uniquely Canadian magazines. In 1998, after the Canadian government attempted to outlaw these types of magazines, the publishers of American magazines, including Sports Illustrated and Time successfully pressured the Canadian government to back down, citing World Trade Organization (WTO) rules and threatening a NAFTA lawsuit.

== Effectiveness ==
The effectiveness of the cultural protectionism measures have been somewhat uneven. Thomas Symons, shortly after the Fowler report's installation in Canadian law, released a report entitled "To Know Ourselves". The report looked at Canadian high-school history books and found that the Winnipeg General Strike went without mention, but the books contained two chapters on US President Abraham Lincoln. The report also looked at Canadian children's general knowledge of their government and found that most could not identify the Canadian head of state (Queen Elizabeth II) and the basis for Canada's law and founding (the British North America Act 1867).

In 1969, Canadian Prime Minister Pierre Trudeau famously said of the United States, "Living next to you is in some ways like sleeping with an elephant. No matter how friendly or temperate the beast, one is affected by every twitch and grunt."

By the 1990s, the great majority of television, films, music, books, and magazines consumed by Canadians continued to be produced outside the country.

Creators of Canadian rap music in 2000 complained that many radio stations did not include rap in their Canadian music content and that television stations aired few rap music videos and news stories, but the Canadian Radio-Television and Telecommunications Commission (CRTC) was slow to grant broadcast licenses for urban music radio stations.

In recent years, the advent of online music and video has allowed international content providers to bypass CRTC regulations in many cases, although the federal government has attempted to close this loophole with the enactment of the Online Streaming Act in 2023, which would apply CRTC jurisdiction to online streaming services based outside of Canada with regards to access of such services within Canada. Nonetheless, existing private contracts keep certain international content providers, such as Hulu, out of Canada entirely.

== See also ==
- Royal Commission on National Development in the Arts, Letters and Sciences (Massey Report), 1951
- Culture of Canada
- Cultural imperialism
- Canadian nationalism
- Cultural exception (cultural protectionism in France)
- Multiculturalism in Canada
