= Schwanthaler =

Schwanthaler is a surname and may refer to:

- The Schwanthaler Family of Ried im Innkreis
  - Ludwig (Michael Ritter von) Schwanthaler
