= Ried im Innkreis =

Ried im Innkreis Riad
- Municipality
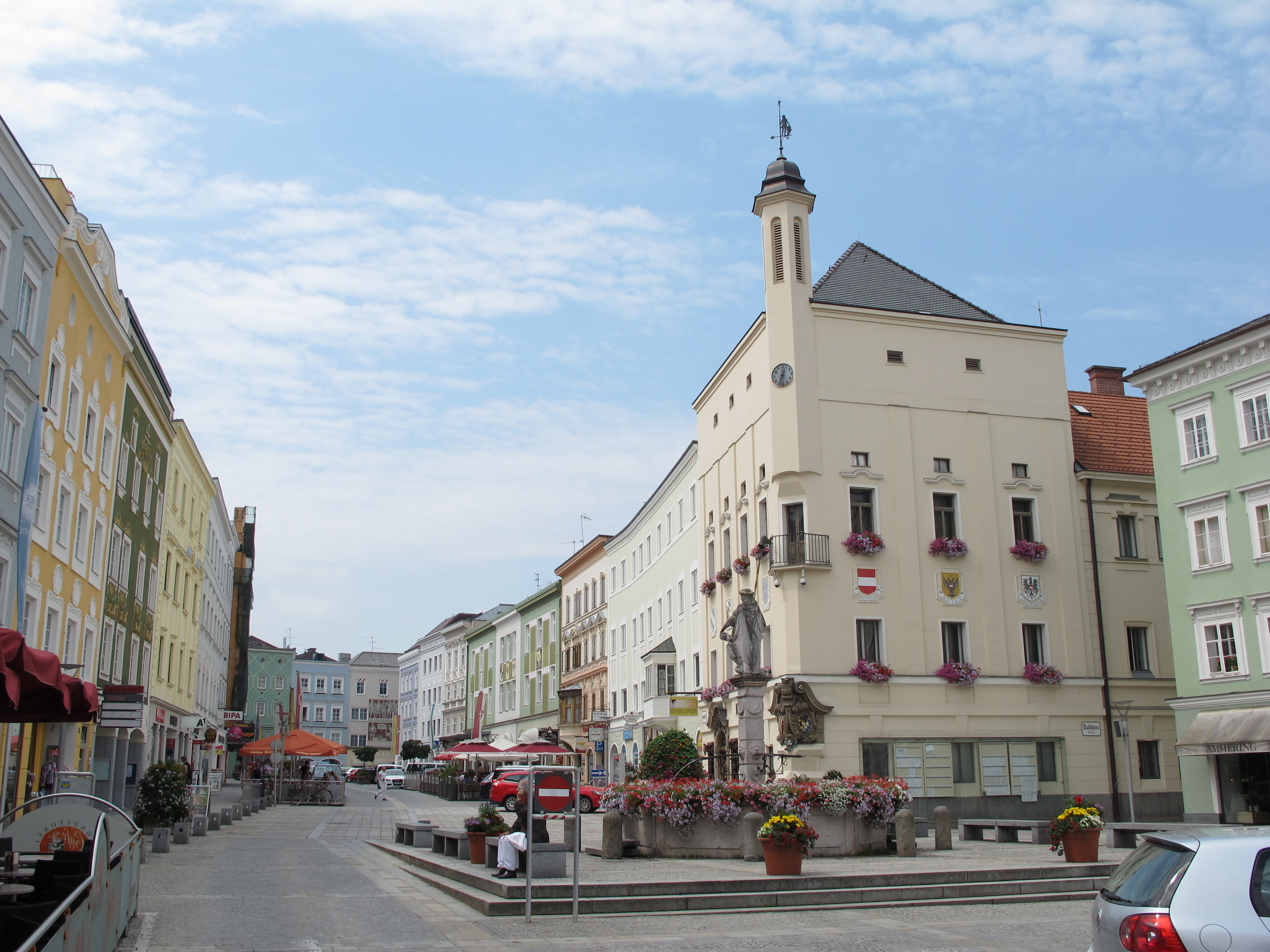
- Main Square in Ried im Innkreis

- Coat of arms

- Location within Austria
- Coordinates: 48°12′36″N 13°29′22″E
- Country: Austria
- State: Upper Austria
- District: Ried im Innkreis

Government
  - Mayor: Bernhard Zwielehner (ÖVP)

Area
  - Municipality: 6.78 km^{2} (2.62 sq mi)
- Elevation: 433 m (1,421 ft)

Population (2018-01-01)
  - Municipality: 11,903
  - Density: 1,760/km^{2} (4,550/sq mi)
  - Metro: 18,367
- Time zone: UTC+1 (CET)
  - Summer (DST): UTC+2 (CEST)
- Postal code: A-4910
- Area code: +43 7752
- Vehicle registration: RI
- Website: www.ried.at

Ried im Innkreis (Central Bavarian: Riad) is a town in the Austrian state of Upper Austria, approximately 70 km (43 mi) west of Linz and 60 km (37 mi) north of Salzburg. It is the capital of the district of Ried im Innkreis, and it serves as the administrative centre for the Innviertel region.

== Geography ==
Ried is situated in a hollow of the Alpine foothills, to the north of the Hausruck Forest (Hausruckwald). The name of the city is derived from the Middle High German "Riet" (also: Rieth, Reet, Rohr, and the like), which denotes the reed which grows along the shores of swamps. Ried im Innkreis is 433 m (1,421 ft) above sea level. It measures 3.2 km (2.0 mi) from the North to the South and 3.6 km (2.2 mi) from the East to the West and it is 6.7 km^{2} (2.6 sq mi) in area.

=== Climate ===
Ried has a humid continental climate, bordering on an oceanic climate.

Ried im Innkreis

Climate chart (precipitation, max. and min. temperature)
J	F	M	A	M	J	J	A	S	O	N	D
59 2 −4	48 4 −3	69 9 1	72 13 3	78 19 8	116 21 11	119 24 13	109 24 13	82 19 10	62 13 5	70 6 0	67 3 −3
- █ Average max. and min. temperatures in °C
- █ Precipitation totals in mm
- Source: ZAMG
Imperial conversion
J	F	M	A	M	J	J	A	S	O	N	D
2.3 36 25	1.9 39 27	2.7 48 34	2.8 55 37	3.1 66 46	4.6 70 52	4.7 75 55	4.3 75 55	3.2 66 50	2.4 55 41	2.8 43 32	2.6 37 27
- █ Average max. and min. temperatures in °F
- █ Precipitation totals in inches

=== Town structure ===
Ried consists of a city core, composed of several spatially separated squares (e.g. Hauptplatz, Stelzhamerplatz, Kirchenplatz, Roßmarkt, Marktplatz, and Hoher Markt), as well as a few other quarters. Most of them have a long history of their own. Others were designed as new development areas and then obtained their own name, but often have no distinct boundaries. In particular, these areas belong to the city core:

- Bad Ried
- Hopfenberg
- Kapuzinerberg
- Kleinried
- Kreuzbergsiedlung
- Lughofergründe
- Riedberg
- Schloßberg
- St. Anna
- Stöcklgras
- Wegleiten

=== Neighbouring municipalities ===
The following municipalities are adjacent to Ried. They are listed in clockwise direction, starting from the South: Neuhofen im Innkreis, Mehrnbach, Aurolzmünster, Tumeltsham and Hohenzell.

== Population ==
Historical population
Year	Pop.	±%
1869	4,428	—
1880	5,155	+16.4%
1890	5,997	+16.3%
1900	5,997	+0.0%
1910	6,245	+4.1%
1923	6,869	+10.0%
1934	7,204	+4.9%
1939	8,730	+21.2%
1951	10,363	+18.7%
1961	9,741	−6.0%
1971	10,758	+10.4%
1981	10,855	+0.9%
1991	11,260	+3.7%
2001	11,404	+1.3%
2013	11,381	−0.2%

== History ==
=== Middle ages ===
Ried was first mentioned on 13 November 1136, as a castle of the Bavarian sovereign with the seat of the noble house of Ried. Already in 1180, the townsmen of Ried were first mentioned in records, indicating a settlement near the castle.

Legend has it that in 1191, Dietmar der Anhanger - a miller's son - obtained the market town of Ried as a fiefdom from Frederick I. (Barbarossa). Allegedly, Dietmar boosted the morale of the troops during the crusade: When the enemy had overthrown the flag of the army in Iconium, Dietmar took off his boot and put it onto a lance; under that sign, the crusaders took new courage and managed to conquer the city. The peasants' boot of this legend is now part of the city's coat of arms.

The line of the lords of Ried ended around 1200 and the Bavarian dukes took over the area. Ried was situated only one and a half hours by foot from the Austrian border at the Geiersberg, and this vicinity proved again and again to be disastrous to the market town of Ried.

In 1266, the Veste Ried was conquered by Ottokar II. Přemysl, and it was again conquered on 24 September 1364 by Rudolf IV. der Stifter and destroyed.

The First Treaty of Ried, negotiated in 1379, halted these border conflicts for the time being. In 1435, Ried obtained its own coat of arms from Duke Henry XVI of Bavaria.

=== Modern times ===
During the Reformation, several reports of ecclesiastic visitations verify the influence of the Reformation. But by 1580, the Counter-Reformation had been completed, which led many to emigrate. During the German Peasants' War, Ried was the asylum and headquarters of the Bavarian war commissioner.

In 1649, a plague epidemic reached the city and took 236 lives.

In the War of the Spanish Succession (1701–1714) and in the War of the Austrian Succession (1740–1745), the border conflicts between Austria and Bavaria resurfaced. After the War of the Bavarian Succession, the Innviertel - including Ried - was ceded to Austria in the Treaty of Teschen 1779. During the Napoleonic Wars, it was temporarily returned to Bavaria in 1810. Napoleon spent the night in Ried twice and narrowly escaped an assassination attempt on 2 May 1809.

With the Treaty of Ried, Bavaria changed sides on 8 October 1813 and joined the Sixth Coalition against Napoleon. After the Treaty of Munich in 1816, Ried finally became Austrian.

As the largest market town of Austria at that time, Ried was granted its town charter by Emperor Franz Joseph I of Austria in 1857. The "Gewerbliche Ausstellungsfest" (Commercial Exhibition Festival), held for the first time in 1867, formed the foundation for Ried's later position as a centre for exhibitions and trade fairs.

=== Contemporary history ===
On 12 March 1938 - the day of the annexation of Austria by Nazi Germany - units of the German Wehrmacht marched into Ried; Hitler passed through the city on his way to Linz. At the end of World War II on 3 May 1945, American troops marched in and the city became part of the American occupation area in occupied Austria. The American military administration built a camp for members of the German military taken as prisoners of war. Besides the prisoner of war camp, a Displaced persons camp was also built. This camp was led by a member of the UNRRA and had the number 701A.

== Politics ==
=== Municipal council ===
Since the local elections in 2003, the municipal council has had 37 members, whose term of office is six years. Since the local elections in 2015, the seats are distributed among the political parties as follows:

- ÖVP 15
- SPÖ 7
- FPÖ 10
- GRÜNE 4
- NEOS 1

=== Mayor ===
Since 1781, Ried has been governed by a mayor and a municipal council. Since 1997, the mayor has been directly elected by the eligible voters for a term of four years, at the same time as the municipal council. The mayor is the chairman of the council. His deputy is the first councillor, the vice-mayor.

Mayors of Ried since 1899

- 1899-1912: Hans Winter
- 1912-1919: Friedrich Thurner
- 1919-1929: Hans Leitgeb
- 1929-1938: Rudolf Wilflingseder
- 1938-1945: Rudolf Pospischek
- 1945: Wilhelm Soukop
- 1945-1954: Adolf Matulik
- 1954-1958: Rudolf Wilflingseder
- 1958-1967: Adolf Matulik
- 1967-1979: Franz Fruhstorfer
- 1979-1991: Günther Hummer
- 1991-1994: Günther Nagele
- 1994-2021: Albert Ortig
- since 2021: Bernhard Zwielehner

=== Coat of arms and flag ===
Ried's coat of arms was awarded together with the municipal charter in 1857. The coat of arms is divided into four parts: The upper quarter shows the double eagle and signifies the affiliation to Austria. The lower quarter contains the "Bavarian Wecken" - white-blue rhombuses - and indicates that the town originally belonged to Bavaria.

In the left quarter is the laced boot, which was also on the older coat of arms and refers to the founding legend of the city. The tendrils in the right quarter were also in the original coat of arms and refer to the importance of the city as a centre of brewing.

=== Twin city ===
Since 1974, the Bavarian city of Landshut has been the twin city of Ried.

== Economy and infrastructure ==
=== Transport ===
Railway

The city of Ried is a crosspoint of the railway lines from Braunau to Wels and Linz, and from Schärding to Attnang-Puchheim. The line from Vienna to Ried via Linz travels at one-hour intervals.

Highways

Via the exits Ried/Tumeltsham and Ried/Haag, the city is connected to the motorway A8. Moreover, Ried is well connected to the federal highway network. There are connections to the East and to the West using the B141 and to the North and to the South via the B143.

Air traffic

The international airport of Linz can be reached within 40 minutes by car.

Buses

There are several "citybus" lines providing public transportation in the city.

=== Public facilities ===
Ried has a tax office, a regional court, and a district court. Furthermore, the district authority is based in the city. Since 1846, Ried has also had a hospital of regional importance.

=== Educational institutions ===
The development to a city of schools started with the construction of the high school in 1872. Today the city has two high schools, the Bundes Oberstufenrealgymnasium in the Dr. Thomas Senn-street and the Bundesgymnasium und Bundesrealgymnasium in the Beethovenstraße, three elementary schools, one alternative school (Bildungswerkstatt Schmetterlingsschule und Privatkindergarten), two public secondary schools, one private secondary school (Franziskanerinnen), and one polytechnic institute.

The district capital is the seat of the school authority of the vocational schools (one for commercial skilled trades and the second for mercantile skilled trades), the Federal Commercial Academy, the Federal Commercial School, the College for Occupation in Service Industries Management, and the Higher Technical School for Engineering.

In Ried, there is also a State Music School and the College for Kindergarten Pedagogics with its training kindergarten.

A gymnastics school (Jahnturnhalle) of the Austrian Gymnastics Association (Österreichische Turnerbunde, ÖTB) is also in Ried.

=== City of trade fairs ===
Since 1867, Ried has periodically held trade fairs of several days' duration. The significance and popularity of these exhibitions is reflected by the number of visitors. One quarter of the visitors come from Bavaria, but there are also many visitors from the Czech Republic, Slovakia, Hungary, Slovenia, Italy, Switzerland, and Liechtenstein.

=== Media ===
Weekly journals of Ried are the "Rieder Rundschau", the "Tips Ried-Schärding" (), the (Oberösterreichische Nachrichten, ), and the "Rieder Magazin" (). Since 2005 the TV channel "Ried TV" broadcasts local reports via an optical fiber network and via the internet.

=== Local companies ===
In the industrial sector, Ried is home to the world-famous ski factory, Fischer, FACC (Fischer Advanced Composites Components AG), which builds parts for aeroplanes, Team 7 producing organic furniture, and the company Wintersteiger, a specialist in high-technology plant construction and engineering.

Ried was previously home to two breweries, keeping up the long history of beers in the Innviertel. The Kellerbrauerei was the oldest private brewery in Austria, founded in 1446, but ceased trading in 2013. The Riederbrauerei, founded in 1536, continues to produce beer and soft drinks to this day.

== Culture ==
=== Schwanthaler family ===
The roots of the Schwanthaler family of sculptors are in Ried. In 1632, Hans Schwabenthaler, later Schwanthaler, came to Ried, and the family's factory was there until 1838. His son, Thomas Schwanthaler, made the high altar and the Mount of Olives sculptural group in the town church of Ried. Several sculptures of the family are preserved in many churches of Upper Austria and in the Innviertler Volkskundehaus (folklore museum).

=== Churches and monasteries ===
- Stadtpfarrkirche (town church)
- Altkatholische Christuskirche (Old Catholic Christ Church)
- Dreifaltigkeitskirche Riedberg (Trinity Church Riedberg)
- Kapuzinerkirche (Capuchin Church)
- Methodistenkirche (Methodist Church)
- Neuapostolischekirche (New Apostolic Church)
- Kapuzinerkloster (Capuchin Monastery)
- Redemptoristinnenkloster (Redemptorist Convent) St. Anna

== Sports ==
=== SV Ried ===
Since the 1990s, Ried's football (soccer) club, SV Ried, has seen continuous success at the national level. The club won the Austrian Cup in 1998 and 2011, as well as being the runner-up in the Austrian football championships, and it is currently playing its 19th season in the Bundesliga, the Austrian premier league.

== Notable residents ==
- Anton Zeilinger, born in 1945, physicist: Nobel Laureate in Physics (2022) for work on quantum entanglement, former (2013–2022) president of the Austrian Academy of Sciences. Nicknamed "Mr. Beam".
- Ernst Kaltenbrunner, born in 1903. Starting in January 1943, director of the SS-Reichssicherheitshauptamt (RSHA) of Nazi Germany; thus chief over the RSHA departments of the Gestapo, Kripo, and the SD (Security Services). He was the highest-ranking SS-leader sentenced to death by the Nuremberg Trials, and executed on 16 October 1946.
- Hans Schwabenthaler, settled in Ried in 1632, died 1682, sculptor.
- Thomas Schwanthaler, born in 1634, sculptor.
- Bonaventura Schwanthaler, born in 1678, sculptor.
- Hans Blietel, a martyr of the Hutterites and was burnt to death around 1545.
- Sybil Danning, born on 24 May 1952 in nearby Wels, Hollywood actress. Worked in Ried ages 14–16, as dental assistant to her uncle.
- Emmy Woitsch, born on 9 June 1894, died in 1981, painter.
- Daria Karanowicz, born in 1908, musician.
- Ludwig Pasch, born in 1919, died in 2015, writer and founder of the Innviertler Schulspatzen.
- Wilhelm Dachauer, born on 5 April 1881, died in 1951, painter.
- August Humer, born in 1947 died in 2007, organist and harpsichordist.
- Günter Voglmayr (1968–2012), classical flautist
- Andreas Goldberger, born on 29 November 1972, former ski jumping world champion.
- Heribert Reitboeck, born on 22 June 1933, neuroscientist.
- Manuel Ortlechner, born in 1980, footballer.
- Samuel Radlinger, born in 1992, footballer.
- Farid Hafez, born in 1981, political scientist.
- Patricia Kaiser, born in 1984, former Miss Austria.
- Horst Felbermayr Sr, born in 1945, died in 2020, businessman and racing driver.
