= Law of Germany =

The law of Germany (German: Deutsches Recht), that being the modern German legal system (German: deutsches Rechtssystem), is a system of civil law which is founded on the principles laid out by the Basic Law for the Federal Republic of Germany, though many of the most important laws, for example most regulations of the civil code (Bürgerliches Gesetzbuch, or BGB) were developed prior to the 1949 constitution. It is composed of public law (öffentliches Recht), which regulates the relations between a citizen/person and the state (including criminal law) or two bodies of the state, and the private law, (Privatrecht) which regulates the relations between two people or companies. It has been subject to a wide array of influences from Roman law, such as the Justinian Code, the Corpus Juris Civilis, and to a lesser extent the Napoleonic Code.

== History ==
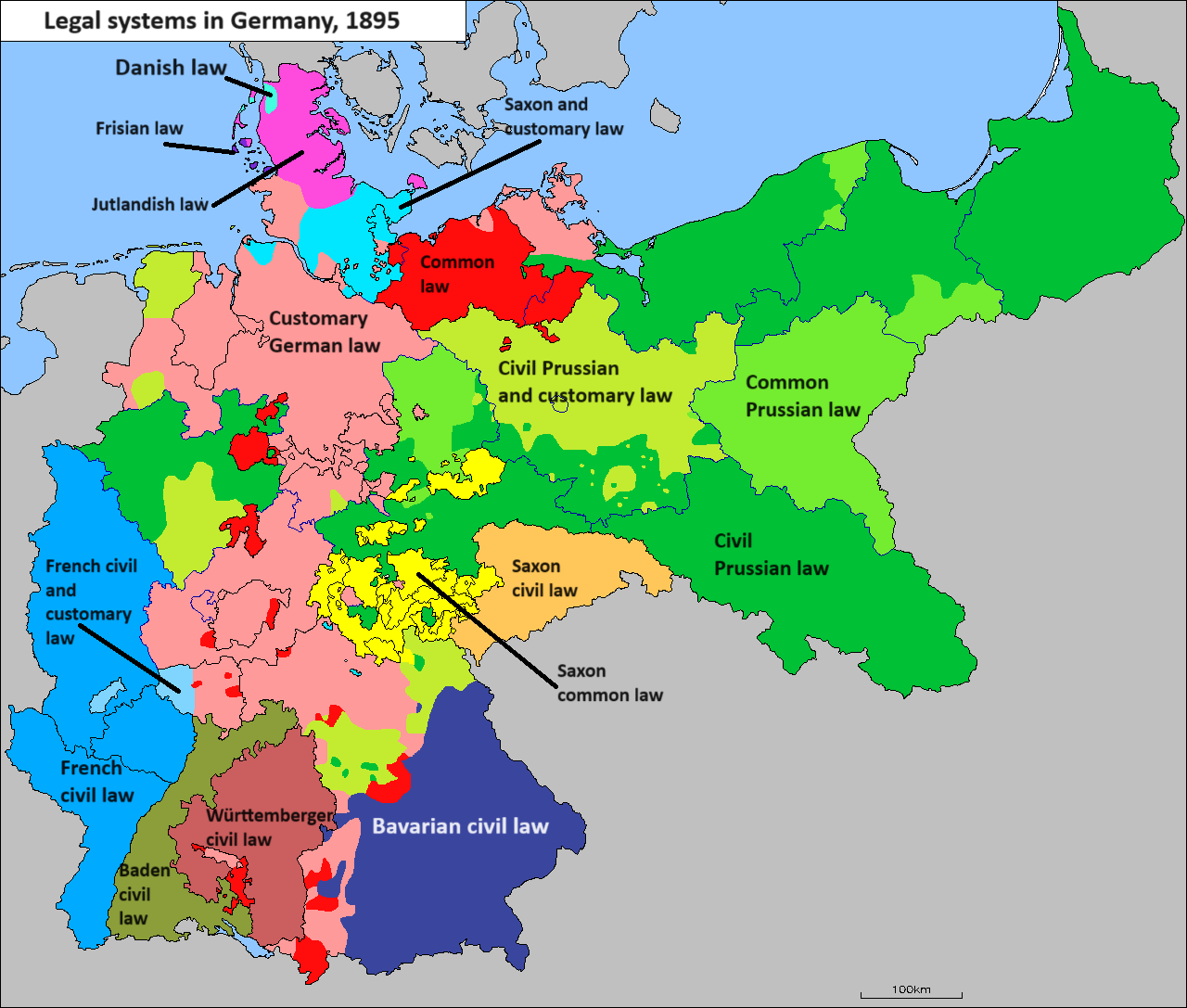
Map of legal systems in Germany before the codification of civil law in 1900

German law has been subject to many influences over the centuries. Until Medieval times the Early Germanic Law, derived from the Salic Law of the Salian Franks and other tribes, was common. With the arrival of the Renaissance, Roman law again began to play a strong role, and later on legal scholars known as the Pandectists revived the formalities of Roman law as set by Justinian in the Corpus iuris civilis. It became common law (Gemeines Recht) in large parts of the German-speaking world and prevailed far into the 19th century. As the Holy Roman Empire was composed of countless minor territorial entities, the laws varied very much, according to local traditions and religions. These laws were codified in about 3,000 local Weistümer (also called Holtinge or Dingrodel), collections of rural laws. Only in relation to the Imperial superior Court of Justice, the Reichskammergericht, there existed codes of procedure. In addition to these the Corpus Iuris Canonici, the source of the better organized ecclesiastical judicature and the old Corpus Iuris Civilis. Both bodies of law were a central part of the education of jurists and therefore generally known among them.

Prussia made an effort to bring in an all-new set of laws with the Allgemeines Landrecht für die preußischen Staaten (General National Law for the Prussian States), a system of codification containing laws in relation to the whole spectrum of legal divisions, in the 18th century, which had a great influence on later works.

After the French July Revolution of 1830, revolutionary ideas of the French Revolution and Napoleon's laws as the Code civil the Code pénal and the Code d'instruction criminelle strongly influenced the German legal tradition, especially in the Grand Duchy of Baden, which sometimes only translated codifications of France for its own use.

With the forming of the Deutsches Reich in 1871, a major process of legal standardization ensued, beginning with criminal law and procedural law and culminating in the Bürgerliches Gesetzbuch (Book of Civil Law) after over twenty years of creative process. Important parts of German legislation still contain regulations of these laws. However, the various states always maintained their own laws to an extent, and still do so in modern federal Germany.

In 1919 in Weimar the Weimarer Verfassung (Weimar Constitution) was created: the first democratic constitution of Germany. This was a very liberal and democratic constitution, but it did not include any basic ethical or political principles. It allowed unlimited changes, the only requirement of any legal decision was a formally correct decision of the appropriate legal institution.

After the war, the two newly emerged German states adopted two different legal systems. The socialist–communist East Germany tried to install new laws strongly influenced by communist and socialist ideology.

The democratic state of West Germany built on existing law. Most of the legal changes of National Socialism were reversed, especially those with ethical criminal content. A new feature was the treatment of the constitution. This constitution was intended to avoid the mistakes of the Weimar Constitution. With the reunification of the two states, West German law was set in force for the most part. A fairly recent development is the influence of European law which aims to harmonize laws in the various states of the European Union, so that many legal developments are taken out of the hand of the federal government and are decided in Brussels instead, where Germany has its own influence on the process along with the other members. German law is still strongly influenced by federalism, and the individual states (Länder) each have their own responsibilities and particular laws, which can be seen as inefficient, but allows for regional variation and promotes meaningful regional democratic responsibility. German legal tradition has in turn influenced many other countries. For example, the legal systems of Japan, the Republic of Korea (South Korea), United States of America and the Republic of China (Taiwan) are to some extent based on German law.

== Public law ==
Public law (Öffentliches Recht) rules the relations between a citizen or private person and an official entity or between two official entities. E.g., a law which determines taxes is always part of the public law, just like the relations between a public authority of the Federation (Bund) and a public authority of a state (Land).

Public law was formerly based on the so-called "Über-Unterordnungs-Verhältnis" ("superiority inferiority relationship"). That means that a public authority may define what is to be done, without the consent of the citizen. (E.g., if the authority orders a citizen to pay taxes, the citizen has to pay, even without an agreement.) In return, the authority has to abide by the law and may only order if empowered by a law.

The newer and now most acknowledged theory to determine whether a regulation is public or civil law is the "modifizierte Subjektstheorie" (modified theory of subjects). A codified regulation is public law, if at least one of the subjects is part of the state ("Der Staat" as is meant legislative, executive and judiciary) or is legally empowered to act on behalf of any part of the state. This Theory was necessary, because the Theory of "Über-Unterordnungs-Verhältnis" failed in certain situations, e.g.: A parent is legally superior to a minor. The minor cannot sign any contract without a parent's consent. Following the old theory, this would be a case of "Überordnung", which would qualify these regulations as public law. The newer theory qualifies these regulations as private law, because though the parents are superior, they are not part of the state nor acting on behalf of any.

A subject in the sense of the Modifizierte Subjektstheorie is the addressee, that might be entitled or obligated to do or to forbear something; e.g.: Tax Laws entitle the state to collect taxes, criminal law entitles the state to imprison criminals and also obligates the state to resolve crimes.

=== Constitutional law ===
The constitution (Verfassung) is called the Grundgesetz (Basic Law) because the drafters saw this legal "corpus" as a provisional document, to be replaced by the constitution of a future united Germany. In reaction to National Socialism, the Grundgesetz shows mistrust towards its own people and its own government and was created as a reaction to the problems of the Weimar Constitution. Where the Weimar Constitution was weak, this constitution, the Basic Law was strong, where the Weimar Constitution left every decision to the free will of the legislator, the basic law defines the boundaries that nobody is allowed to cross. Wherever possible, powers are limited and controlled.

The constitutional law (Verfassungsrecht) deals, of course, mostly with Germany's constitution and the rights and duties of the various institutions. A major part are the Civil rights which are first in the basic law (Grundgesetz) and from which everything else derives. As usual in western democracies, the three powers are separated: the executive is taken care of by the government, the judicative by the courts and judges, and the legislative is managed by the federal and state parliaments. The most important principles, apart from that, are Democracy, Federalism and Rechtsstaatsprinzip, meaning that the whole of the state must be based on laws. These parts of the Grundgesetz are forbidden to be changed.

Decisions may be made according to the definition of these regulations, but the essential content has to be unaffected. The highest authority in constitutional law, and to some extent in German law as a whole, is the Federal Constitutional Court (Bundesverfassungsgericht). The Bundesverfassungsgericht is no Supreme Court. It is not a court of last instance. Its only purpose is the protection of the constitution, by control of the actions of government, judicative and legislative according to constitutional procedures and the ensuring of constitutional rights and duties. Here, the various parts of the state can dispute about the extent of their authority, but it is also the place to appeal to when a citizen feels that he is being deprived of his civil rights.

This particular matter takes up a lot of the court's work and often reshapes the legal process itself if the court finds that a certain law does in fact interfere with civil rights. Decisions of other courts are varied only with regard to violations of the constitution. Other mistakes are not relevant. Again, European law has a certain influence here as the Grundgesetz is no longer the sole source of law, instead it is joined by the treaties and laws of the European Union. Apart from the constitution of the Federal Republic, each state ("Land") has its own constitution (e.g. see Constitution of Hamburg) and, necessarily, its own constitutional law and court. Nonetheless the Grundgesetz and the Bundesverfassungsgericht are appropriate to actions of the states (Länder) and their branches.

=== Administrative law ===
The administrative law is the law of the Executive. It covers most kinds of legal relations between the state and the citizens, but also between different bodies and/or levels of government with the exception of constitutional law, but not those legal relations, when the state closes contracts like any other private citizen. The highest administrative court for most matters is the Bundesverwaltungsgericht (Federal Administrative Court). There are federal courts with special jurisdiction in the fields of social security law (Bundessozialgericht) and tax law (Bundesfinanzhof).

=== Administrative civil law ===
The executive may act on grounds of the "Bürgerliches Gesetzbuch" (BGB, "civil code"). However, if a governmental office acts on ground of the "BGB" (e. g.: is buying a pencil), this office is bound to the "Grundgesetz" (and other laws) to prevent unequal treatment of citizens and businesses.

=== Criminal law ===
Criminal law is a matter of federal law in Germany. The main source of law here is the German Penal Code promulgated in 1871. Minors under 14 years old cannot be held liable for crimes in court; however, for minors between 14-18 years of age and in case of missing maturity under the age of 21, there are special juvenile courts and some adjustments to the criminal law as well. In court, a public prosecutor (Staatsanwalt) carries out prosecutions, and the defendant can (in many cases has to) choose a defence attorney to defend him. The office of the public prosecutor (Staatsanwaltschaft), together with the police forces, handle the investigations in the case at hand, yet they are not party to the case. The judgement is handed down by a single judge or in higher courts a bench of judges, of which two are lay magistrates (Schöffen) in certain cases. In the criminal system, judges and magistrates are the only triers of fact and law; German law does not recognize trial by jury. Sentences run the gamut from fines to life imprisonment, which is usually open to appeal after 15 or more years for constitutional reasons. The death penalty is explicitly forbidden by the constitution. Extremely dangerous persons can be turned over for psychiatric treatment or have to stay in prison as long as necessary—which can mean for the rest of their lives (Sicherungsverwahrung)—in addition to their punishment.

== Private law ==
Private law (Privatrecht) rules the relations between two private legal entities (for example, a buyer and a seller, an employer and an employee, a tenant and a landlord) or two entities that act on the same level as private persons (e.g., as when an authority buys its office supplies from a private company). In contrast, whenever a state agency exercises official power, private law is not to be applied.

=== Civil law ===
Civil law (Bürgerliches Recht) determines the relationships among persons and/or legal entities, i.e. those who do not fall into a special category (like merchants or employees). The most important reference of this area is the Civil Law Book (Bürgerliches Gesetzbuch, BGB), which consists of 5 major parts: the common/general part, the law of obligations, property law, family law and law of succession.

The most important principle of the BGB is Privatautonomie, which states that all citizens have the right to rule their own affairs without interference from the state, especially in the disposal of their property according to their will and the creation of contracts with partners and with the contents they like. Because of this, most of the rules in the BGB are only supplied in case that the partners of a contract did not make an agreement on that special point themselves. However, in the last few years there has been a tendency towards more regulation, especially between a professional and a consumer, declaring such contracts that place an undue burden on one party, to be invalid. Other groups of people that enjoy protection are minors and people in a weak economic position.

The most important creation of the BGB is the Principle of Abstraction (Abstraktionsprinzip). According to this principle, contracts only create an obligation, but there are no actual changes to the legal correlation concerning the object of the contract. To create these changes by fulfillment of the obligation, a different contract, regulated in property law, is necessary. By this way, the sale of a burger in exchange for one Euro means three different contracts. One contract concluded by coincident declarations of intent, where the parties agree to buy one burger to the payment one Euro and to create the obligation of the seller, to transfer the burger and to provide property on the burger, to create the obligation of the buyer to transfer the Euro and to provide property on the Euro and finally to create a dependence between these two obligations. The second contract consists of the transfer of the burger and the coincident declarations of intent to provide property by doing so. The third contract consists of the transfer of the Euro and the coincident declarations of intent to provide property by doing so. This doesn't mean that contracts in Germany are more complicated to the people involved. Especially the contracts of everyday life do not differ with those in other countries in their outer appearance. For instance, if someone buys a newspaper at a newsstand without saying one single word to the seller, all the three contracts which are mentioned above are fulfilled by conclusive demeanor.

== Procedural law ==
The procedural system of Germany is based on a highly active role of the judge or the judges. In all branches of jurisprudence the judge takes evidence himself, only assisted by the parties or their lawyers, although in some branches the court is limited to proof, referred by the parties. In court, both parties have the same rights and duties. Each side can (in higher courts must) require the services of one or several attorneys. They present facts and evidence for their version of the case of their own accord and without the help of the judge, who then makes his judgement independently. With the exception of Social Law and some parts of Labor Law, the costs of all the participants of the lawsuit (including the costs of the opponent) have to be paid by the unsuccessful party to the extent that it did not prevail.

== Comparative law ==
German law is a civil law system and is more driven by formal rules than common law systems such as the English law, where arguments can be made on the basis of common sense. However the principle of natural justice has been applied in instances where the formal interpretation of law leads to injustice such as the prosecution of GDR officials, or abortion.German courts are not required to follow the precedent of previous court decisions. Academic legal writing has more of a role in decision making in courts than in other legal systems, particularly common law systems where decisions are nominally based on precedence from court decisions. Courts may change longstanding judicial principles based on academic writing.

== See also ==
- Reich law
- Judiciary of Germany
- Legal systems of the world
- Japanese law, which is based heavily on German civil law
- Copyright in Germany

=== Articles about specific German laws ===
- Alcohol laws in Germany
- Asylum in Germany
- Bürgerliches Gesetzbuch
- German Free Software License
- Grundgesetz
- Legal Services Act (Rechtsdienstleistungsgesetz)
- Luftsicherheitsgesetz
- Narcotic Drugs Act (Betäubungsmittelgesetz)
- Strafgesetzbuch
- Strafgesetzbuch § 86a which bans "use of symbols of unconstitutional organisations" – such as Nazi salutes.
- Textile Labelling Act (Germany)
- Transparency in Wage Structures Act
- Völkerstrafgesetzbuch
