= Royal Commission on National Development in the Arts, Letters and Sciences =

Commission examining Canada's cultural needs from 1949–1951

- Also known as: Massey Commission
- Outcome: Report of the Royal Commission on National Development in the Arts, Letters and Sciences
- Commissioners: Vincent Massey (Chair); Arthur Surveyor; Norman MacKenzie; Hilda Neatby; Georges-Henri Lévesque
- Inquiry period: 8 April 1949 – 1951

The Royal Commission on National Development in the Arts, Letters and Sciences, otherwise known as the Massey Commission, chaired by Vincent Massey, was founded in 1949 to examine Canada's cultural needs. Massey had long believed that Canadians' rich cultural history was deeply embedded in European culture but was too little known to the world. An avid art collector himself, he sponsored exhibits in Europe and saw the need for a national commitment to promoting the arts.

== The report ==
Other than Massey, the commissioners included social scientist Georges-Henri Lévesque, historian Hilda Neatby, university president Norman MacKenzie, and engineer Arthur Surveyor, co-founder of SNC-Lavalin. They held public hearings across Canada. The final report appeared in June 1951. It advised that Canada's international identity needed building up, and must be based on more than political and economic factors. It argued that the arts provide a strong sense of national community, and that the government should establish a national board to administer public funds intended to encourage work in the arts, humanities, and social sciences. It especially wanted funding for nonprofit agencies, rather than for-profit corporations. It called for more money for universities and strengthening existing public radio system, and its expansion into television. Without aggressive federal funding, the report suggested, there was a risk of that authentic Canadian culture would be crowded out of its own nation by Cheaper American popular culture.

The government accepted the recommendations on university funding and strengthening the CBC; otherwise it largely ignored the report. However, the Report did lead to the establishment of the National Library of Canada in 1953 and the Canada Council for the Encouragement of the Arts, Letters, Humanities, and Social Sciences in 1957. Contrary to the recommendation not to support a private film industry, in 1967 the government created the Canadian Film Development Corporation (CFDC) to subsidize films, that could reach the American mass-market.

Francophone critics accused the report of privileging elite, Anglophone conservative culture at the expense of Quebec's historic cultural.

... the literature of the United States, which in the last thirty years has acquired an increasing international reputation, exercises an impact which is beneficial in many respects no doubt, but which, at the same time, may be almost overpowering. (Report, chapter 15)

== See also ==
- Canadian cultural protectionism
