= Koulsy Lamko =

Chadian writer and academic

- Born: 25 October 1959 (age 66); Chad
- Citizenship: Chad
- Occupations: Writer, playwright, poet, novelist, cultural activist, actor, university teacher

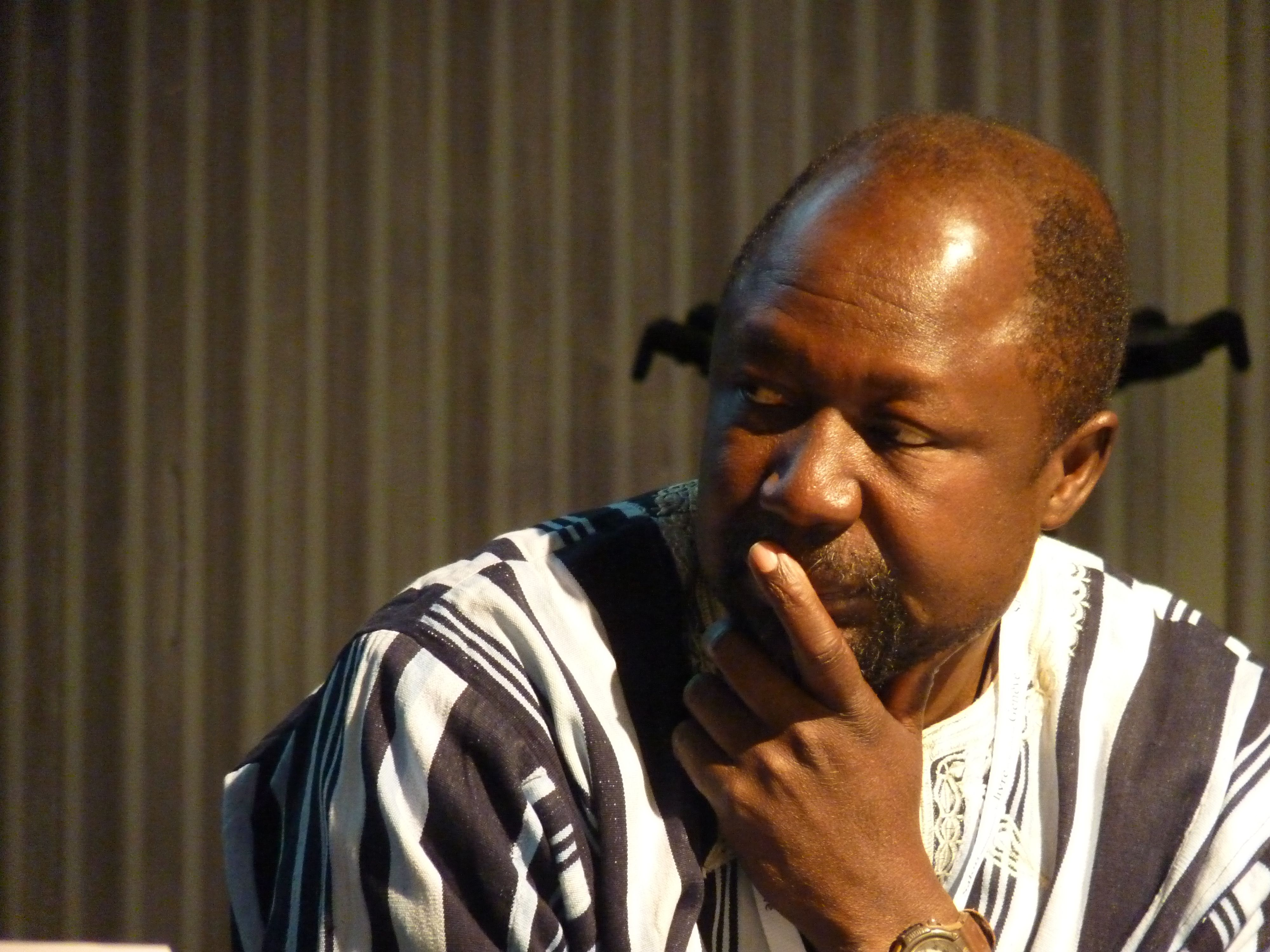
Koulsy Lamko in Geneva, 2012

Koulsy Lamko (born 1959) is a Chadian-born playwright, poet, novelist and university lecturer. Born in Dadouar, Lamko left his country for Burkina Faso in 1979 due to the beginning of the civil war. There, he became acquainted with Thomas Sankara and involved with the Institute of Black Peoples in Ouagadougou. Lamko spent ten years promoting community theater in Burkina Faso through the Theater of the Community and helped found the International Festival of Theatre for Development. Some of his poetry was published in Revue Noire in 1994. In 1997 he co-released the album Bir Ki Mbo of mixed poetry and music in tribute to Sankara in collaboration with Stéphane Scott and Rémi Stengel. A regular attendant at the Limousin Festival International des Francophonies, he briefly lived in Limoges, France. He then moved to Rwanda, where he read for his doctorate at the National University in Butare while founding the university's Center for the Arts and the Theater and teaching theater and creative writing. His doctoral thesis was on emerging theatrical aesthetics in Africa. His experience in Rwanda led him to write his novel, La phalène des collines ("The butterfly of the hills"), about the 1994 genocide.

In 2009 he stayed, as a guest of Amsterdam Vluchtstad, in the former apartment of Anne Frank and her family at the Amsterdam Merwedeplein.

He currently lives in Mexico City.

== Publications ==
Plays

- Le camp tend la sébile, 1988, Editions Presses Universitaires de Limoges
- Ndo kela ou l'initiation avortée, 1993, Editions Lansman
- Tout bas … si bas, 1995, Editions Lansman
- Comme des flèches, 1996, Editions Lansman
- Le mot dans la rosée, 1997, Editions Actes Sud Papiers
- La tête sous l'aisselle, 1997, Editions Ligue de l'Enseignement and DGER

Short stories and tales

- Regards dans une larme, 1990, Editions Mondia-Canada
- Les repos des masques, 1995, Editions Marval
- Sou, sou, sou, gré, gré, gré, 1995, Editions FOL Haute Vienne
- Aurore, 1997, Editions Le bruit des autres

Novels

- La phalène des collines, 2000, Centre Universitaire des Arts
- Les racines du yucca, 2011, Philippe Rey

Poetry

- Exils, Solignac 1993, Le bruit des Autres

Essays

- Koulsy Lamko on exotic man, 2009, The Power of Culture
