= PROPHET system =

Early medical expert system

The PROPHET system was an early medical expert system.

The system was initiated in about 1965 by a young administrator at NIH, William Raub, who had the idea to set up a collaborative communication network modeled on ARPANET, for use among biomedical investigators to share data and procedures, with a wide range of computational tools, ranging from statistics to molecular orbit calculations.

A panel of NIH advisors planned the system over a couple of years, until Bolt, Beranek and Neman (BBN Technologies) received the contract for implementation.

The PROPHET system was operational for 15 to 20 years before being superseded by more current Internet tools.

According to NIH, "PROPHET is the most nearly comprehensive set of information-handling tools for this area of science ever to be presented in a unified system, and offered as a service to the biomedical community."

== Archival materials ==
The Computer History Museum holds materials related to PROPHET, including two brochures about "Prophet, a National Computing Resource for Life Science Research" from BBN and a BBN Prophet II Design Manual.
