= Bundesgesetzblatt (Germany) =

Government gazette of the Federal Republic of Germany

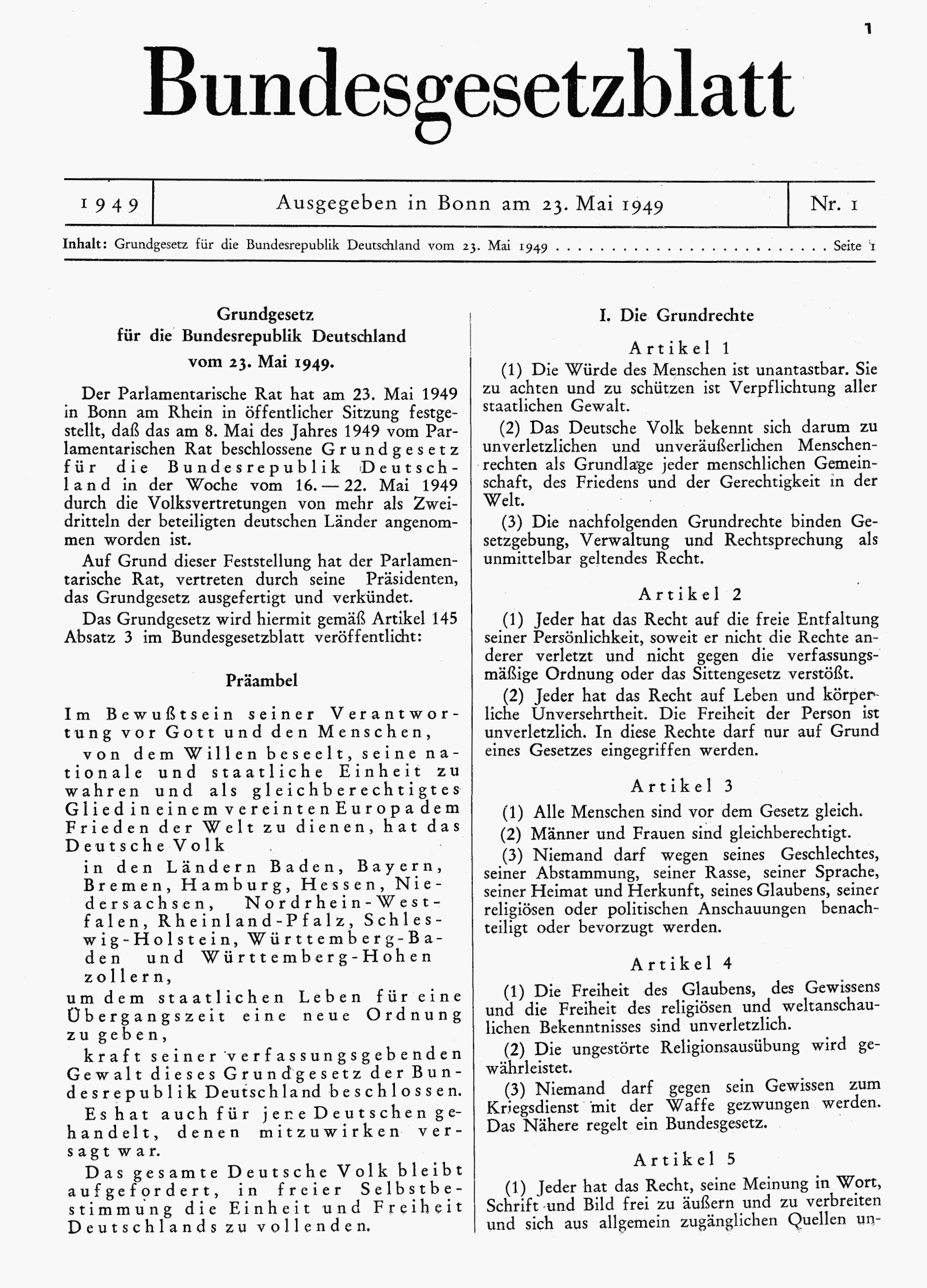
Bundesgesetzblatt, Bonn, 23 May 1949, No. 1 with the Basic Law for the Federal Republic of Germany

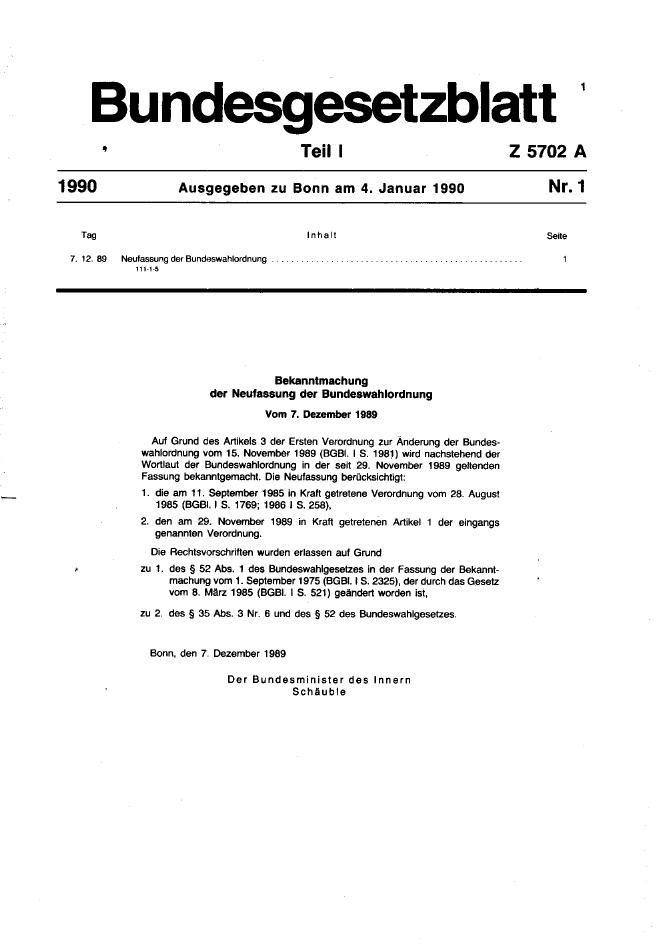
BGBl. 1990

The German Bundesgesetzblatt (German: [bʊndəsɡəˈzɛt͡sˌblat], BGBl.) (Federal Law Gazette) is a public gazette of the Federal Republic of Germany. It is issued by the Federal Ministry of Justice and Consumer Protection and published by the Federal Office of Justice. It was published by Bundesanzeiger Verlag GmbH until the end of 2022.

It is the main law gazette by the legislative body next to gazettes of the federal ministries such as the Bundessteuerblatt (BStBl.) or the Gemeinsames Ministerialblatt (GMBl.)

In December 2018, the Open Knowledge Foundation Germany (OKF) made its own portal with the content of the Federal Law Gazette freely available online, accepting a copyright conflict with Bundesanzeiger Verlag. A few days later, the then Federal Minister of Justice, Katarina Barley, told the Frankfurter Allgemeine Zeitung that the promulgation of federal laws and ordinances would only take place electronically from 2022. A citizens' portal would be set up for this purpose. However, the Basic Law must first be amended and the contract with DuMont terminated.

After the Bundestag and Bundesrat gave their approval in December 2022, the amendment to the Basic Law came into force on December 24, 2022. The new Promulgation and Announcement Act was promulgated in the Federal Law Gazette on December 28, 2022 and came into force on January 1, 2023. On January 4, 2023, the first purely electronic edition of the Federal Law Gazette was published with an amendment to the Construction Site Ordinance.

Since 2023, the Bundesgesetzblatt is published in electronic form, similar to the Official Journal of the European Union and the Bundesanzeiger.
