= Rwanda Development Gateway =

Project to set up a national Rwandan portal for information sharing

Rwanda Development Gateway (RDG) is a project of the Government of Rwanda run under the National University of Rwanda (NUR). The RDG is implementing a Program to set up a National Portal as platform for information sharing. The Portal represents a one-stop-shop for information on Rwanda and the country’s web interface to the rest of the world.

The RDG aims at poverty reduction by providing opportunities for knowledge sharing and networking among communities to drive the development agenda in a participatory way, basing on local priorities. This is in line with the Vision 2020 and the National Information and Communications Infrastructure (NICI) Plans.

== History and Impact ==
Since its inception, RDG has developed and managed www.rwandagateway.org, an online platform providing access to comprehensive information about Rwanda and connecting the country with the rest of the world. By 2007, the Gateway experienced significant growth in demand for its services, establishing itself as a leader in the web and content development market in Rwanda.

RDG combines income-generating services with pro bono work to serve a diverse range of clients and partners. It uses open-source tools to create customized web-based solutions tailored to the needs of the local community. Its efforts include an e-agriculture program in collaboration with the Ministry of Agriculture, enabling stakeholders to access data such as trade figures and crop prices.

To strengthen connections between local Rwandans and the diaspora, RDG developed an online management information system. This system supports initiatives allowing members of the diaspora to engage in short-term volunteer work in Rwanda, helping to reverse the outflow of skills and expertise.

== Future Developments ==
The Rwanda Development Gateway has achieved financial sustainability and plans to expand its offerings by creating a software development unit. It continues to explore how technology can drive economic growth and development while meeting the needs of local communities through innovative ICT solutions.
