= Textile Labelling Act (Germany) =

Law on the Labelling of Clothes in Germany

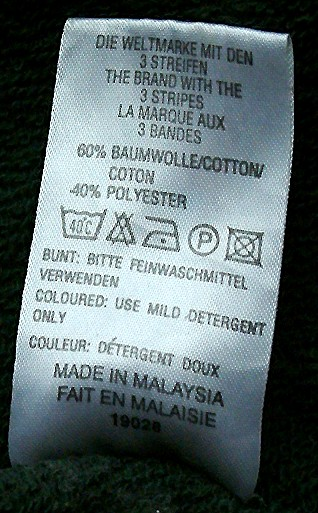
Label indicating the composition of textiles

The Textile Labelling Act (German: Textilkennzeichnungsgesetz, short TextilKennzG) is a German consumer protection law that requires mandatory labelling for clothing and other fabrics. Any textile sold, imported, or produced for sale in Germany is required to have a label indicating the type and proportion by weight of its constituent raw materials. Catalogues and brochures are also required to state the a garment's composition.

The first version of the law was decreed on 1 April 1969, and was completely rewritten and the new version was announced on 14 August 1986. The law was last changed by decree on 14 November 2006.

Textiles in the context of this law is any good, fabric, part of mattress or camping good, lining of shoes and gloves, floor-covering and many other goods which consist of at least 80% textile raw materials. Textile raw materials are filaments or hairs which can be spun, including bands and flexible tubes not wider than 5mm.

For example, if a T-shirt consists of 80% cotton and 20% elastane, this has to be declared on the label of the garment. If the shirt consists of 100% cotton, it can be labeled with "100% cotton", "completely made of cotton", or "pure cotton". Special regulations exist for things made of wool and silk. Annex one of the law regulates the denomination of the various filaments.

In annex three, there is a list of things that do not need a label indicating their composition, such as wristbands for watches, labels, artificial flowers, etc. Annex four lists products that don't need a label but just an indication of their composition at the site of sale. This applies in particular to things traditionally sold per meter like ribbons or elastic tape.

Violators can fined up to 5,000 Euros.

It is not obligatory to declare the country of production on labels. This declaration is optional. Care instructions are printed on labels for liability- and compensation-prevention and are also optional.
