= Bundesanzeiger =

German official publication

The Bundesanzeiger (BAnz) (engl. Federal Gazette) is an official publication of the Federal Republic of Germany issued by the German Federal Ministry of Justice and Consumer Protection (BMJV) with a scope similar to that of the Federal Register in the United States. It is used for mandatory legal and judicial announcements, announcing changes in the Handelsregister and for legally mandated announcements by the private sector.

Since 2023, laws and regulations have only been published in the Bundesgesetzblatt (BGBl.).

The Bundesanzeiger is published exclusively in electronic form by the Bundesanzeiger Verlag GmbH.
