= Legal Services Act (Germany) =

2008 German federal law

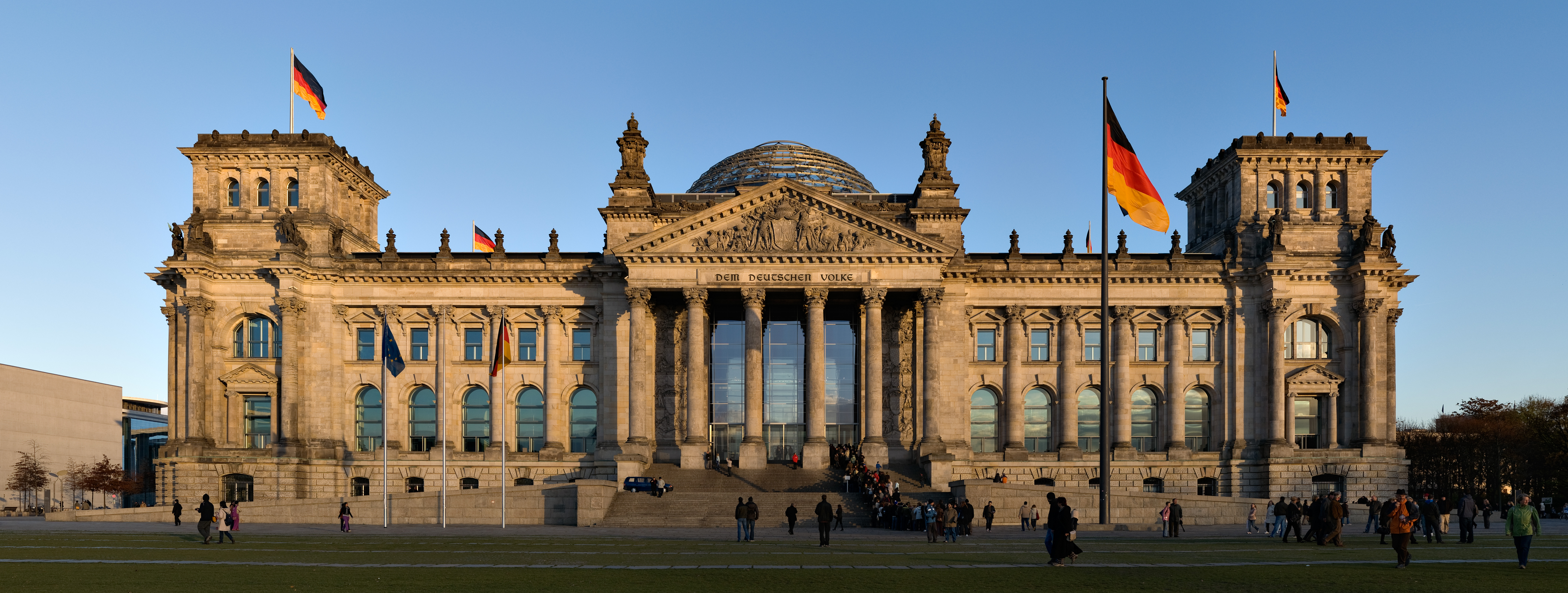

Bundestag
- Long title: Act on Out-of-Court Legal Services
- Territorial extent: Germany
- Passed by: Bundestag
- Passed: 11 October 2007
- Commenced: 1 July 2008

Repeals
- Legal Advice Act of 1935
- Status: In force

The Legal Services Act (German: Rechtsdienstleistungsgesetz or RDG) is a German federal law that regulates the provision of extrajudicial legal services. It entered into force on July 1, 2008.

The Legal Services Act, adopted by the Bundestag on 11 October 2007, replaced the Legal Advice Act of 1935 and restructured the regulation of extrajudicial legal services in Germany. While the reform opened limited avenues for non-lawyers to provide legal assistance, it preserved the core principle that comprehensive legal advice and court representation remain reserved to fully qualified lawyers. The legislature justified this restriction by pointing to the complexity of German law - particularly in areas such as tax law - and the risk of serious harm arising from incomplete or inaccurate legal advice. Representation before courts, therefore, continues to require admission to the bar where self-representation is not permitted.

A central innovation of the RDG was the statutory definition of a "legal service" as any activity in specific third-party matters that requires a legal examination of the individual case. This definition replaced the fragmented terminology of the former Legal Advice Act. It clarified the boundary between permitted factual assistance and other regulated legal activities. The Act allows non-lawyers to perform subordinate or ancillary legal activities - such as providing general legal information, asserting undisputed claims, or assisting in contract conclusions - provided no individual legal assessment is undertaken. In addition, persons whose professional profile necessarily includes legal expertise, such as architects, insurance companies, or real estate agents, may offer legal services within the scope of their primary occupation when such services are ancillary to their main activity.

Before its adoption, critics warned that the Legal Services Act could weaken consumer protection and lead to an increase in litigation, particularly in areas such as debt collection. However, early assessments following its implementation indicated that these concerns were largely unfounded. Consumer protection organisations reported no significant rise in complaints, and professional legal associations likewise observed a marked decline in disputes compared with the frequent litigation generated under the former Legal Advice Act. The RDG has therefore generally been regarded as a pragmatic reform that expanded access to legal assistance while maintaining safeguards through registration requirements, professional oversight, and the continued central role of qualified lawyers in complex legal matters.
