= Rwanda Investigation Bureau =

Rwanda Investigation Bureau (RIB; Kinyarwanda: Urwego rw'Igihugu rushinzwe ubugenzacyaha; French: Office Rwandais d’Investigation) is a Rwandan national law enforcement agency. Its head office is in Kamukina, Kigali.

== See also ==
- Paul Rusesabagina
