= National University of Rwanda =

Former university in Rwanda

- Kaminuza nkuru y’u Rwanda; Université nationale du Rwanda
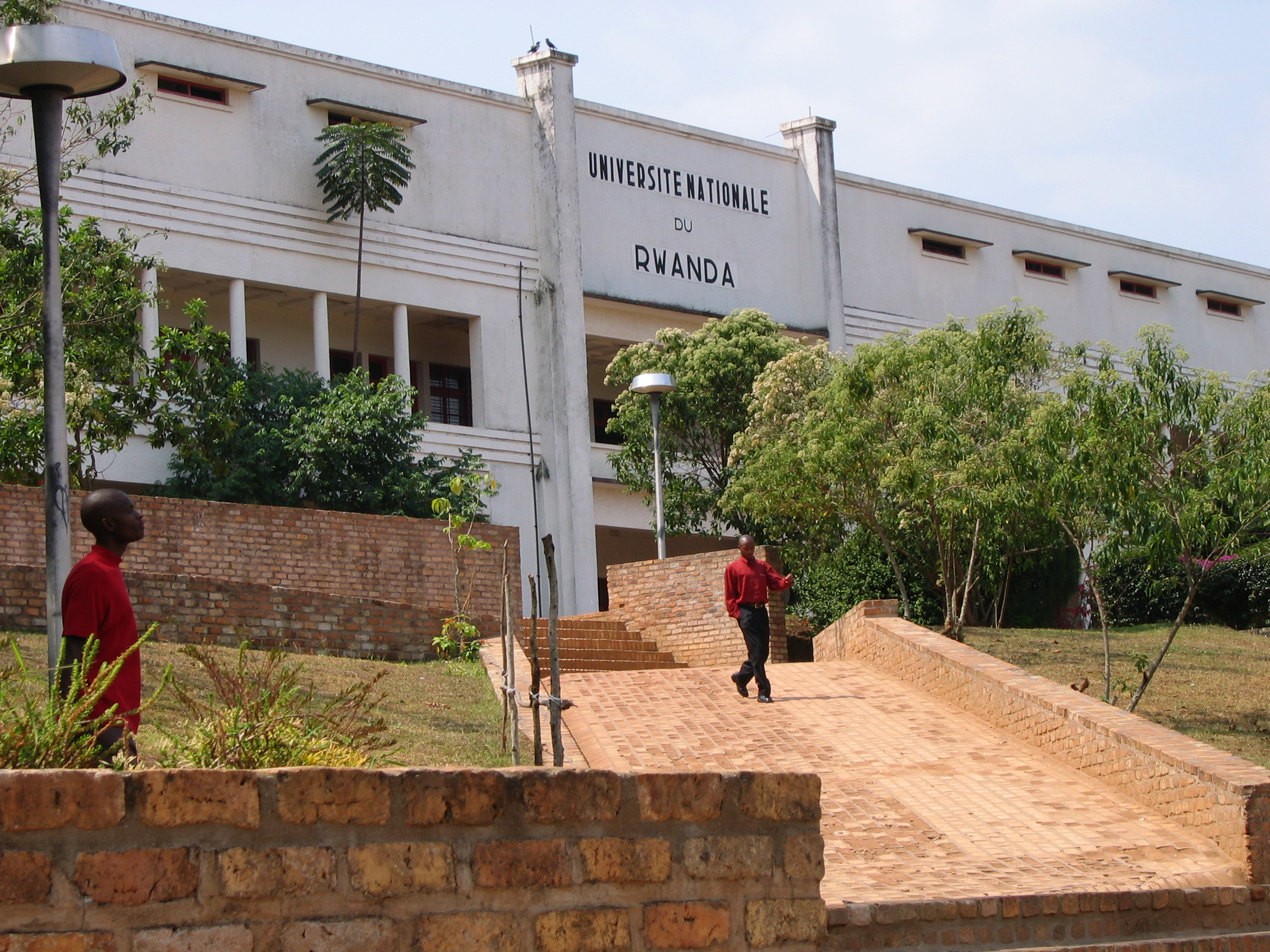
- Motto: Excellence in Education and Service to the People
- Type: Education, Research
- Active: 1963–2013 (merged into University of Rwanda)
- Founder: Georges-Henri Lévesque
- Location: Butare, Huye, Southern Province, Rwanda
- Colors: Green, White
- Website: http://www.nur.ac.rw/

The National University of Rwanda (NUR; Kinyarwanda: Kaminuza nkuru y’u Rwanda, French: Université nationale du Rwanda, UNR) was the largest university in Rwanda. It was located at 2°36′58″S 29°44′34″E in the city of Butare and was established in 1963 by the government in cooperation with the Congregation of the Dominicans from the Province of Quebec, Canada. Its founder and first rector was Father Georges-Henri Lévesque.

When it was established, the NUR had three divisions (Faculties of Medicine and Social Sciences, and a Teacher Training College), 51 students and 16 lecturers. The university suffered badly during the genocide and had to close in 1994, reopening in April 1995. At that time English was introduced as a medium of instruction alongside French.

In 2013, along with all public higher education institutions in Rwanda, it was merged into the newly created University of Rwanda.

== History ==
When it started in 1963, NUR was composed of three academic units: the Faculty of Medicine, the Faculty of Social Sciences and the Teacher Training College (ENS). At that time, it had 51 students and 16 lecturers. By 2005, the university had 8221 students and 425 lecturers. Important dates and facts are:

- November 3, 1963: Official opening of NUR
- May 12, 1964: Law establishing the NUR
- 1966: The National Institute of Education was created thanks to the UNDP and UNESCO: The Institute aimed at training and improving elementary secondary school teachers’ skills. It also aimed at implementing multidisciplinary pedagogical research.
- 1967: Creation of the University Extension as a unit with the mission to reflect NUR by its services to the people
- 1972: Creation of a research centre on pharmacopoeia and traditional medicine (CUPHARMETRA) in the Faculty of medicine. This became an autonomous body in 1980.
- May 1973: NUR, in conjunction with the Ghent Faculty of Applied Sciences put up a progressive training program for civil engineers specialized in building and set up a fore-project program in electro mechanic engineering.
- October 1973: The University of Instelling Antwerpen contributed in the opening of the Faculty of Law.
- 1974: A centre for study and experimentation of energy in Rwanda was created within the Faculty of Sciences. It became autonomous since 1977.
- June 13, 1979: The Faculty of Agronomy, which was a department in the Faculty of Science, was created.
- October 1, 1981: NUR and the NIE (National Institute of Education) were merged. Since then, the National University of Rwanda had two campuses: one at Ruhengeri and another at Butare. A few years later, the Faculty of Law shifted to Mburabuturo (Kigali).
- November 1988: Celebration of the 25th anniversary of NUR. Official opening of the Institute of Public Administration (ISAP), born of NUR and Konrad Adanauer Foundation (FKA) cooperation
- April–July 1994: The University community lost a good number of its staff and students who were killed during the war and genocide. They were victims of their ideology or ethnic identity. The University suffered a great loss: laboratory equipment, the computer equipment and academic infrastructure were destroyed or taken away. NUR was closed because of the prevailing war in the country, those who were not killed had to hide themselves, and others fled in exile.
- January 1995: The campus of Ruhengeri and the Kigali Faculty of Law shifted and become part of the campus of Butare.
- April 1995: Reopening of NUR. The main change was that all the faculties and schools were regrouped in Butare Campus for security reasons first and then for administrative reasons. The beginning was not easy but the government decided upon the smooth running of NUR at all costs. A Campus that was built for 1,600 students now had to lodge more than 4,500. NUR took off slowly but surely despite the wounds of war. English became a new language of teaching.
- April 2, 1996: Creation of the School of Information Sciences and Techniques (ESTI)
- 1997: A preliminary year of language learning (French and English) is established for all UNR beginners.
- 1998: Creation of a doctorate level at the Faculty of Medicine
- June 15, 1998: Creation of the Research Commission
- End of 1998: The merging of the Faculty of Sciences and that of Applied Sciences to form the Faculty of Sciences and Technology.
- 1999: Creation of the Centre for Conflict Management
- November 27, 1999: The University League against Aids (LUCS) was created
- December 1999: Creation of the University Centre for Arts. Its mission was to dynamise arts and culture, in order to bring its contribution to the strategies of reconciliation, peace and national unity. Moreover, it would promote the international extension of Rwandan culture.
- April 2000: The School of Public Health was created
- August 2000: The School of Information Sciences and Techniques (ESTI) became the School of Journalism and Communication. The programme changed to answer more efficiently to the needs of the country.
- November 3, 2002: The NUR Alumni was created
- October 10, 2005: The official re-launching of post-graduate studies in the Faculty of Medicine
- November 18, 2005: “Radio Salus”, the NUR Radio was officially launched
- 2013: Merged into the newly created University of Rwanda.

== Colleges ==
1998: creation of the department of Clinical Psychology as a response to trauma from the 1994 genocide against the Tutsi. The department was integrated in the Faculty of Education, and later on (2009) moved to the Faculty of Medicine.

== Faculties ==
The university has 9 faculties, comprises:

- Faculty of Medicine
- Faculty of Agriculture
- Faculty of Arts, Media and Social Sciences
- Faculty of Applied Sciences
- Faculty of Law
- Faculty of Science
- Faculty of Economics and Management
- School of Public Health
- School for Foundation Language Skills
- faculty of creative design

== Notable alumni ==
- Aloysie Cyanzayire, first female president of the Supreme Court of Rwanda
- Bernard Makuza, Rwandan politician, former President of the Senate in Rwanda
- Edouard Ngirente, Rwandan politician, Prime Minister of Rwanda
- Pasteur Bizimungu, Rwandan politician, President of Rwanda from 1994 to 2000
- Cyprien Ntaryamira, Burundian politician, former President of Burundi, killed in the crash of President Habyarimana Juvenal in 1994
- Domitien Ndayizeye, Burundian politician, President of Burundi, 2003–2005
- Dr Pierre Habumuremyi, Rwandan politician, former Prime Minister of Rwanda
- Jean-Philbert Nsengimana, Rwandan politician, cabinet minister of Information and Communications Technology
- Dr Alexandre Lyambabaje, Rwandan politician, academician and sportsman, Vice-Chancellor of the University of Rwanda
- Jean Damascène Ntawukuliryayo, Rwandan politician, former President of the Rwandan Senate
- Louise Mushikiwabo, Rwandan politician, Secretary General of La Francophonie and former minister of foreign affairs in Rwanda
- Vincent Munyeshyaka, former cabinet minister of Trade and Industry
- Fanfan Rwanyindo Kayirangwa, Cabinet Minister of Public Service and Labour
- Vincent Biruta, Rwandan politician, current Minister of Foreign Affairs in Rwanda
- Rose Mukantabana, Rwandan politician, first female Speaker of the Chamber of Deputies
- Koulsy Lamko, Chadian-born playwright, poet and novelist
- Alice Rwema, vice chairperson and company secretary of Rwanda Energy Group
- Pauline Nyiramasuhuko, convicted for genocidal rape
- Jeannette Bayisenge, Rwandan politician, Minister of Public Service and Labour
- Jeanne d'Arc Debonheur, Rwandan minister of Refugees and Disaster Management
