= Supreme Court of Rwanda =

Highest court of Rwanda

The Supreme Court of Rwanda is the highest court of Rwanda, as defined by Article 143 of the 2003 Constitution of Rwanda. Article 144 of the Constitution determines that the Supreme Court is the highest jurisdiction in the country. Article 145 empowers the Supreme Court to coordinate and oversee the activities of the lower courts and tribunals, while ensuring judicial independence.

Aloysie Cyanzayire was the first female president of the Supreme Court of Rwanda; she served an eight-year term from 2004 until 2012.

== Composition ==
- Domitilla Mukantaganzwa, president
- Aloysie Cyanzayire
- Richard Muhumuza
- Jean Bosco Kazungu
- Isabelle Kalihangabo
