= MFG Austria – People Freedom Fundamental Rights =

Political party in Austria

MFG Austria – People Freedom Fundamental Rights MFG Österreich – Menschen Freiheit Grundrechte
- Abbreviation: MFG
- Chairman: Michael Brunner
- Deputy Chairman: Christian Fiala
- General Secretary: Gerold Beneder
- Founded: 2 February 2021
- Headquarters: Wollzeile 6–8 1010 Wien
- Membership (2021): 4,000
- Ideology: Anti-lockdown; Vaccine hesitancy
- Political position: Syncretic
- Colours: Grey; Red-purple; Orange (since 2024)
- National Council: 0 / 183
- Federal Council: 0 / 60
- European Parliament: 0 / 20
- State Parliaments: 3 / 440

Website
- mfg-oe.at

MFG Austria – People Freedom Fundamental Rights (German: MFG Österreich – Menschen Freiheit Grundrechte, MFG) is a minor political party in Austria. The party is often described by media outlets as the "anti-vaccination" or "vaccine-critical" and its voters have been described as following or spreading conspiracy theories. The party claims to have 4,000 members.

== History ==
In the 2021 Upper Austrian state election, the party achieved 6.23% of the votes cast and will thus be represented with 3 seats in the Upper Austrian Landtag. It is strongly represented in Upper Austria, especially in the Ried im Innkreis District, where after it was founded, local groups formed in eight communities: Aurolzmünster, Eberschwang, Geinberg, Gurten, Ried im Innkreis, Sankt Martin im Innkreis, Utzenaich and Waldzell. With Joachim Aigner, the top candidate for the 2021 Upper Austrian state election also comes from the Ried District. The party got its best results in communities with many unvaccinated people.

The party scored a major election result in the January 2022 municipal election in Waidhofen an der Ybbs in Lower Austria, winning more than 17% of the vote. In the municipal elections in Tyrol in February 2022, the party competed in 50 of 274 municipalities, winning seats in 47 of them and averaging about 10% of the vote. It has also setting up leadership and organizational structures in all 9 federal states and competed in the 2022 Austrian presidential election with party leader Michael Brunner.

In the 2024 European parliament election in Austria, the party did not run a candidate list. In the 2024 Austrian legislative election, the party received 0.4% of the vote and did worse than fellow anti-vaccination party Madeleine Petrovic List.

== Leadership ==
As of June 2026, the leadership consists of the following:

- Party chairman: Robert Glaubauf
- Deputy Party Chairman: Dagmar Häusler
- Financial secretary: Manuel Krautgartner
- Deputy financial secretary: Martin Steiner
- Secretary: Karin Waltran

== Election results ==
=== National Council ===
| Election | Leader | Votes | % | Seats | +/– | Government |
|---|---|---|---|---|---|---|
| 2024 | Joachim Aigner | 18,799 | 0.40 (#10) | 0 / 183 | New | Extra-parliamentary |

=== President ===
| Election | Candidate | First round result | | | Second round result | | |
| Election | Candidate | Votes | % | Result | Votes | % | Result |
|---|---|---|---|---|---|---|---|
| 2022 | Michael Brunner | 85,465 | 2.11 | 6th place | —N/a | | |

=== State Parliaments ===
| State | Year | Votes | % | Seats | ± | Government |
|---|---|---|---|---|---|---|
| Upper Austria | 2021 | 50,325 | 6.23 (#5) | 3 / 56 | N/A | Opposition |
| Tyrol | 2022 | 9,539 | 2.78 (#7) | 0 / 36 | N/A | Extra-parliamentary |
| Lower Austria | 2023 | 4,367 | 0.49 (#6) | 0 / 56 | N/A | Extra-parliamentary |
| Salzburg | 2023 | 2,071 | 0.77 (#8) | 0 / 36 | N/A | Extra-parliamentary |
| Styria | 2024 | 552 | 0.08 (#9) | 0 / 48 | N/A | Extra-parliamentary |

== See also ==
- Democratic – Neutral – Authentic
- Grassroots Democratic Party of Germany
- Vision Austria
