= Michael Ranseder =

Austrian motorcycle racer

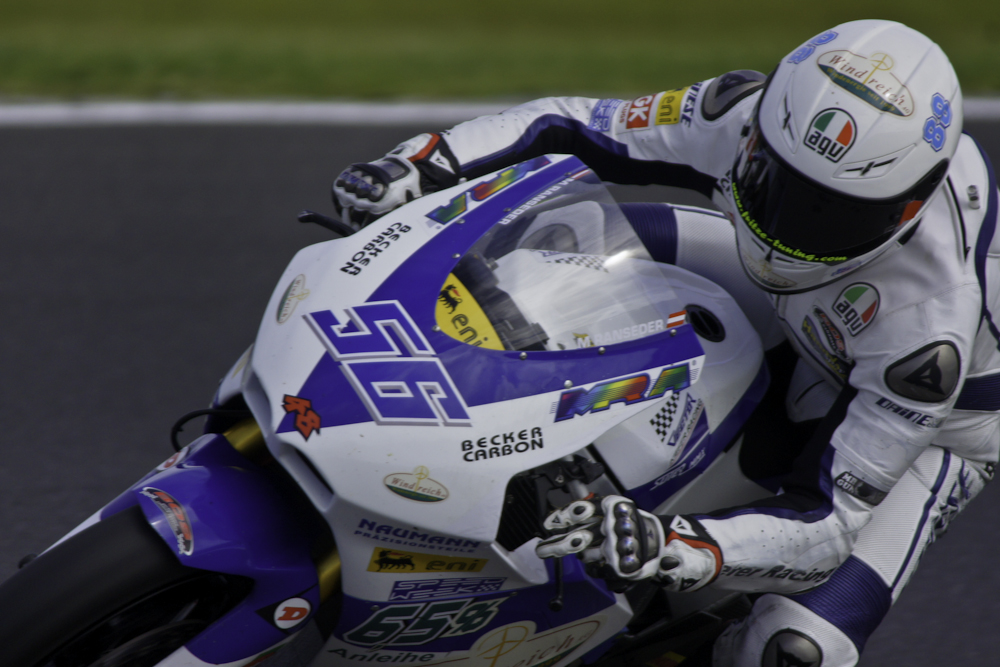
- Ranseder at the 2010 Australian Grand Prix
- Nationality: Austrian
- Born: April 7, 1986 (age 40); Antiesenhofen, Austria
Motorcycle racing career statistics
Moto2 World Championship
Active years	2010
Manufacturers	Suter
Championships	0
2010 championship position	35th (4 pts)
Starts / Wins / Podiums / Poles / F. laps / Points; 6 / 0 / 0 / 0 / 0 / 4
125cc World Championship
Active years	2004–2009
Manufacturers	KTM, Derbi, Aprilia, Haojue
Championships	0
2009 championship position	25th (9 pts)
Starts / Wins / Podiums / Poles / F. laps / Points; 62 / 0 / 0 / 0 / 1 / 116

Michael Ranseder (born 7 April 1986 in Antiesenhofen) is an Austrian motorcycle racer who participates in motorcycle Grand Prix races. He currently competes in the IDM Superbike Championship.

Ranseder's first points came at Catalunya in 2005.

== Career statistics ==
=== Career highlights ===
2002 - 2nd, ADAC Junior Cup #18 Aprilia RS 125
2003 - 6th, German IDM 125 Championship #18 Honda RS125R
2004 - 1st, German IDM 125 Championship #6 KTM 125 FRR
2005 - 2nd, German IDM 125 Championship #1 KTM 125 FRR
2006 - 31st, 125cc World Championship #9 KTM 125 FRR
2007 - 12th, 125cc World Championship #60 Derbi RS 125 R
2008 - 23rd, 125cc World Championship #60 Aprilia RS 125 R
2009 - 25th, 125cc World Championship #88 Hajoue 125 / Aprilia RS 125 R
2010 - 2nd, German IDM Supersport Championship #18 Yamaha YZF-R6
2011 - 2nd, German IDM Superbike Championship #18 BMW S1000RR
2012 - 2nd, German IDM Superbike Championship #2 BMW S1000RR
2013 - 2nd, German IDM Superbike Championship #18 Honda CBR1000RR
2014 - 12th, German IDM Superbike Championship #18 Honda CBR1000RR

=== Grand Prix motorcycle racing ===
==== By season ====
Season	Class	Motorcycle	Team	Number	Race	Win	Podium	Pole	FLap	Pts	Plcd
2004	125cc	KTM	Red Bull KTM Junior Team	88	2	0	0	0	0	0	NC
2005	125cc	KTM	Red Bull KTM ADAC Juniors	76	4	0	0	0	0	12	25th
2006	125cc	KTM	Red Bull KTM Junior Team	9	15	0	0	0	0	0	NC
2007	125cc	Derbi	Ajo Motorsport	60	17	0	0	0	0	73	12th
2008	125cc	Aprilia	I.C. Team	60	14	0	0	0	1	22	23rd
2009	125cc	Haojue	Haojue Team	88	1	0	0	0	0	9	25th
2009	125cc	Aprilia	CBC Corse	88	9	0	0	0	0	9	25th
2010	Moto2	Suter	Vector Kiefer Racing	56	6	0	0	0	0	4	35th
Total					**68**	**0**	**0**	**0**	**1**	**120**	

==== Races by year ====
(key) (Races in bold indicate pole position, races in italics indicate fastest lap)

Year	Class	Bike	1	2	3	4	5	6	7	8	9	10	11	12	13	14	15	16	17	Pos	Pts
2004	125cc	KTM	RSA	SPA	FRA	ITA	CAT	NED	BRA	GER	GBR	CZE; 16	POR	JPN	QAT	MAL	AUS	VAL; 18		NC	0
2005	125cc	KTM	SPA	POR	CHN	FRA	ITA	CAT; 12	NED; 12	GBR	GER; 12	CZE; Ret	JPN	MAL	QAT	AUS	TUR	VAL		25th	12
2006	125cc	KTM	SPA; 20	QAT; Ret	TUR; 26	CHN; 33	FRA; 16	ITA; Ret	CAT; Ret	NED; 22	GBR; 18	GER	CZE; 18	MAL; 20	AUS; 20	JPN; 23	POR; Ret	VAL; 24		NC	0
2007	125cc	Derbi	QAT; 13	SPA; 9	TUR; 12	CHN; 7	FRA; 14	ITA; 11	CAT; 10	GBR; 20	NED; 9	GER; 10	CZE; 8	RSM; 10	POR; Ret	JPN; 9	AUS; 22	MAL; Ret	VAL; 13	12th	73
2008	125cc	Aprilia	QAT; 15	SPA; 16	POR; 14	CHN; 7	FRA; Ret	ITA; 15	CAT; 17	GBR; 12	NED; 14	GER; Ret	CZE; 21	RSM; 13	INP; Ret	JPN; Ret	AUS	MAL	VAL	23rd	22
2009	125cc	Haojue	QAT; Ret	JPN; DNS	SPA; DNS	FRA; DNQ	ITA	CAT	NED											25th	9
2009	125cc	Aprilia								GER; Ret	GBR; Ret	CZE; 20	INP; 16	RSM; 11	POR; Ret	AUS; 20	MAL; 12	VAL; Ret		25th	9
2010	Moto2	Suter	QAT	SPA	FRA	ITA	GBR	NED	CAT	GER	CZE	INP; DNS	RSM; 14	ARA	JPN; 20	MAL; 14	AUS; Ret	POR; Ret	VAL; 20	35th	4
