= Rieder Bach =

Rieder Bach may refer to:

- Rieder Bach (Rinchnach), a river of Bavaria, Germany, tributary of the Rinchnach
- Rieder Bach (Mindel), a river of Bavaria, Germany, tributary of the Mindel
- Rieder Bach (Antiesen), a river in the town Ried im Innkreis of the Austrian state of Upper Austria, tributary of the Antiesen
