= Oberach =

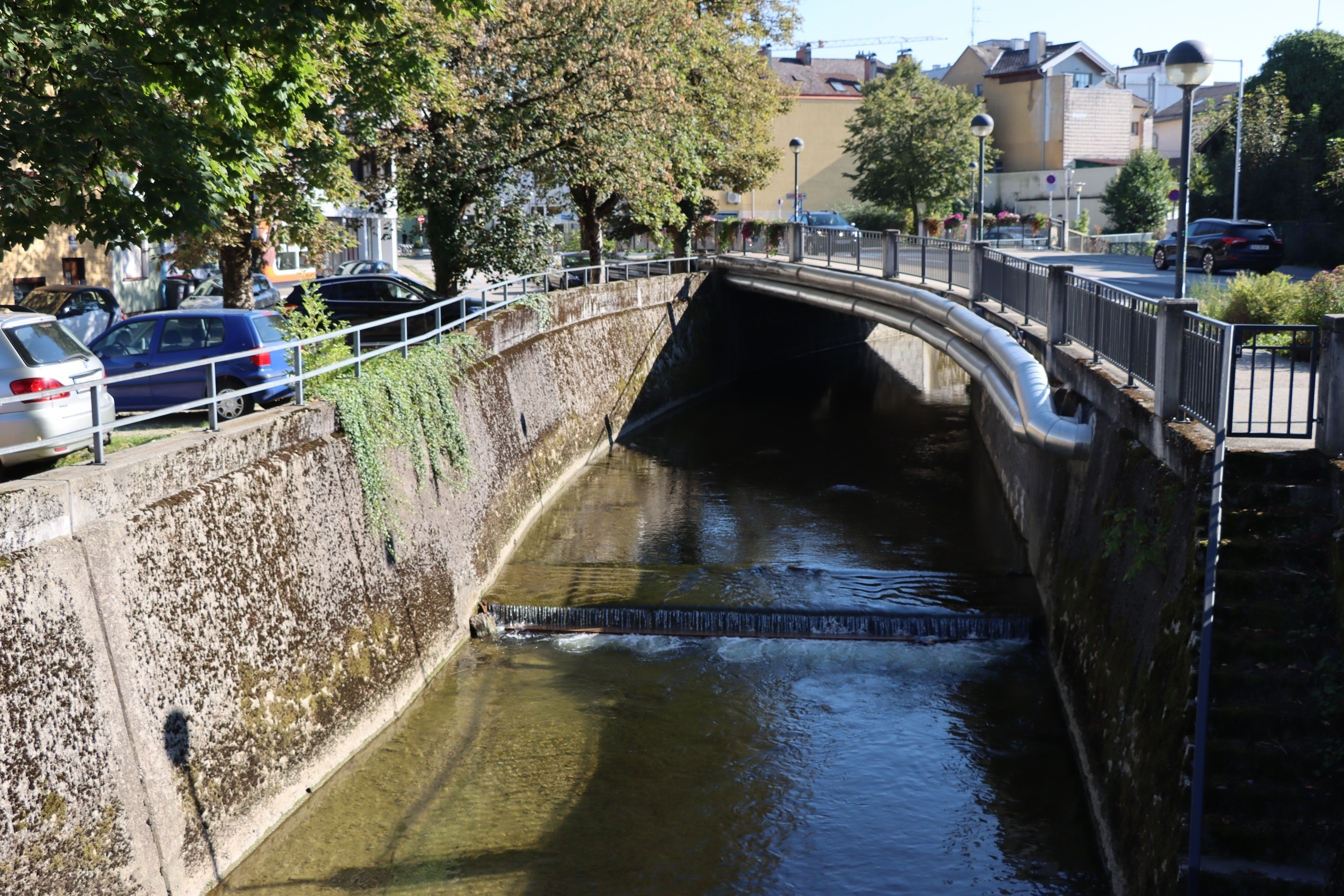

Location
- Country: Austria
- State: Upper Austria

Physical characteristics
- Mouth
  - location: Antiesen
  - coordinates: 48.2311°N 13.4696°E
- Length: 18.2 km (11.3 mi)

Basin features
- Progression: Antiesen→ Inn→ Danube→ Black Sea

Oberach is a river in the Innviertel of the Austrian state of Upper Austria. It is a tributary of the Antiesen. Its source is in the municipality of Pramet. Below its confluence with the Breitsach in Ried im Innkreis, it is also called Rieder Bach.
