= Lohnsburg =

Lohnsburg am Kobernaußerwald
- Municipality
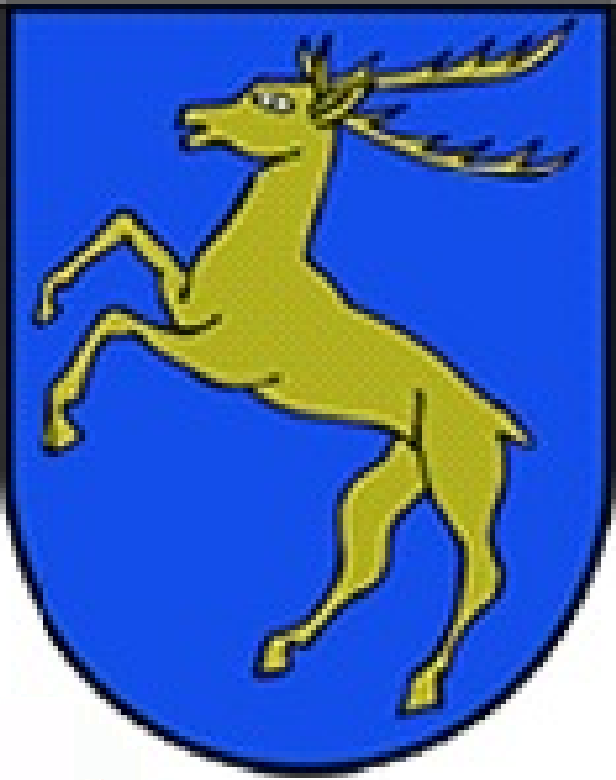
- Coat of arms

- Location within Austria
- Coordinates: 48°08′42″N 13°24′23″E
- Country: Austria
- State: Upper Austria
- District: Ried im Innkreis

Government
  - Mayor: Maximilian Mayer (ÖVP)

Area
  - Total: 39.59 km^{2} (15.29 sq mi)
- Elevation: 523 m (1,716 ft)

Population (2018-01-01)
  - Total: 2,234
  - Density: 56.43/km^{2} (146.1/sq mi)
- Time zone: UTC+1 (CET)
  - Summer (DST): UTC+2 (CEST)
- Postal code: 4923
- Area code: 07754
- Vehicle registration: RI
- Website: www.lohnsburg.at

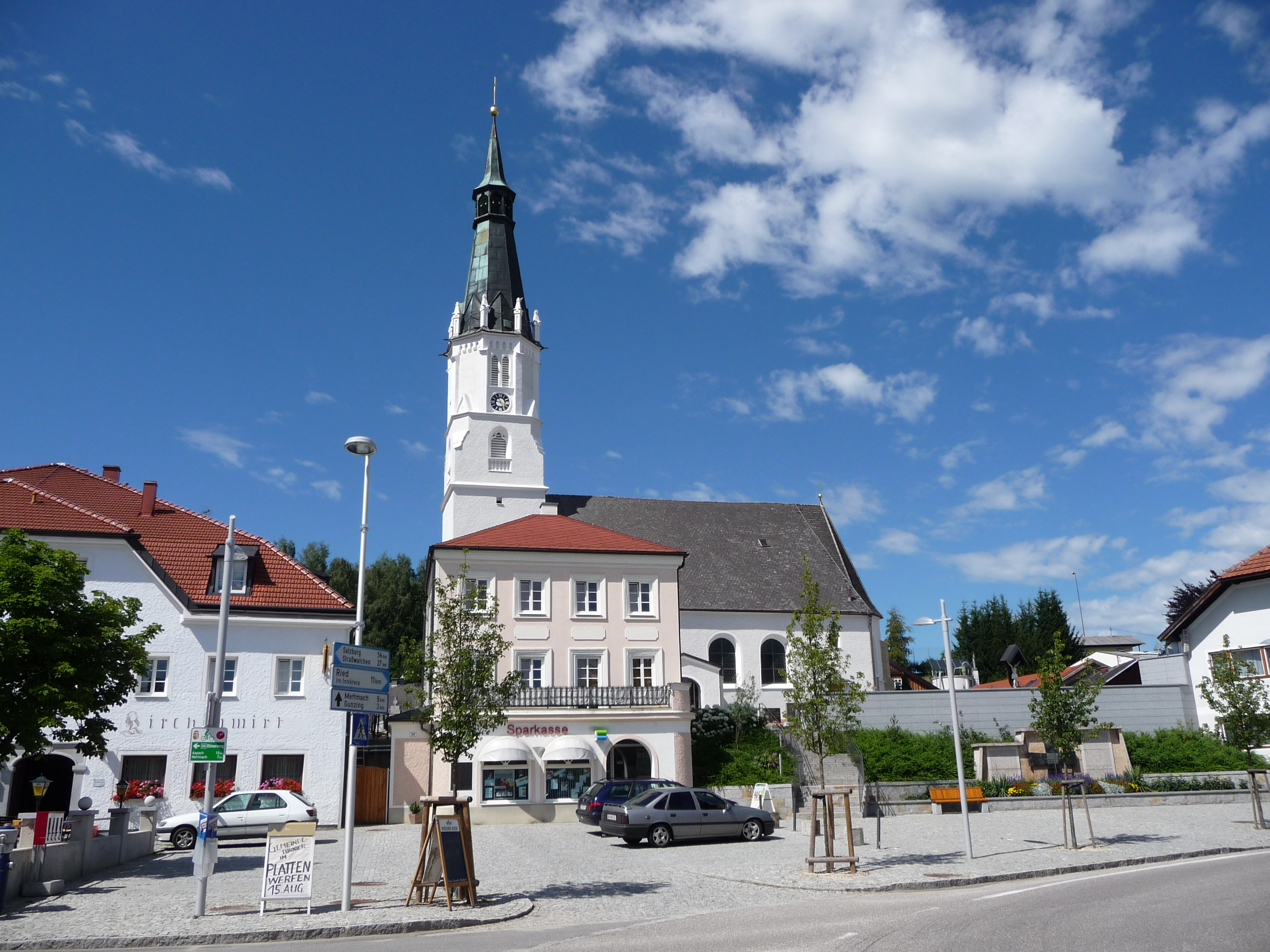
Lohnsburg

Lohnsburg is a municipality in the district of Ried im Innkreis in the Austrian state of Upper Austria.

== Population ==
Historical population
| Year | Pop. | ±% |
|---|---|---|
| 1869 | 1,775 | — |
| 1880 | 1,753 | −1.2% |
| 1890 | 1,903 | +8.6% |
| 1900 | 1,814 | −4.7% |
| 1910 | 1,803 | −0.6% |
| 1923 | 1,866 | +3.5% |
| 1934 | 1,928 | +3.3% |
| 1939 | 1,900 | −1.5% |
| 1951 | 2,063 | +8.6% |
| 1961 | 2,002 | −3.0% |
| 1971 | 2,085 | +4.1% |
| 1981 | 2,129 | +2.1% |
| 1991 | 2,297 | +7.9% |
| 2001 | 2,324 | +1.2% |
| 2013 | 2,170 | −6.6% |
