= Ort im Innkreis =

- Municipality
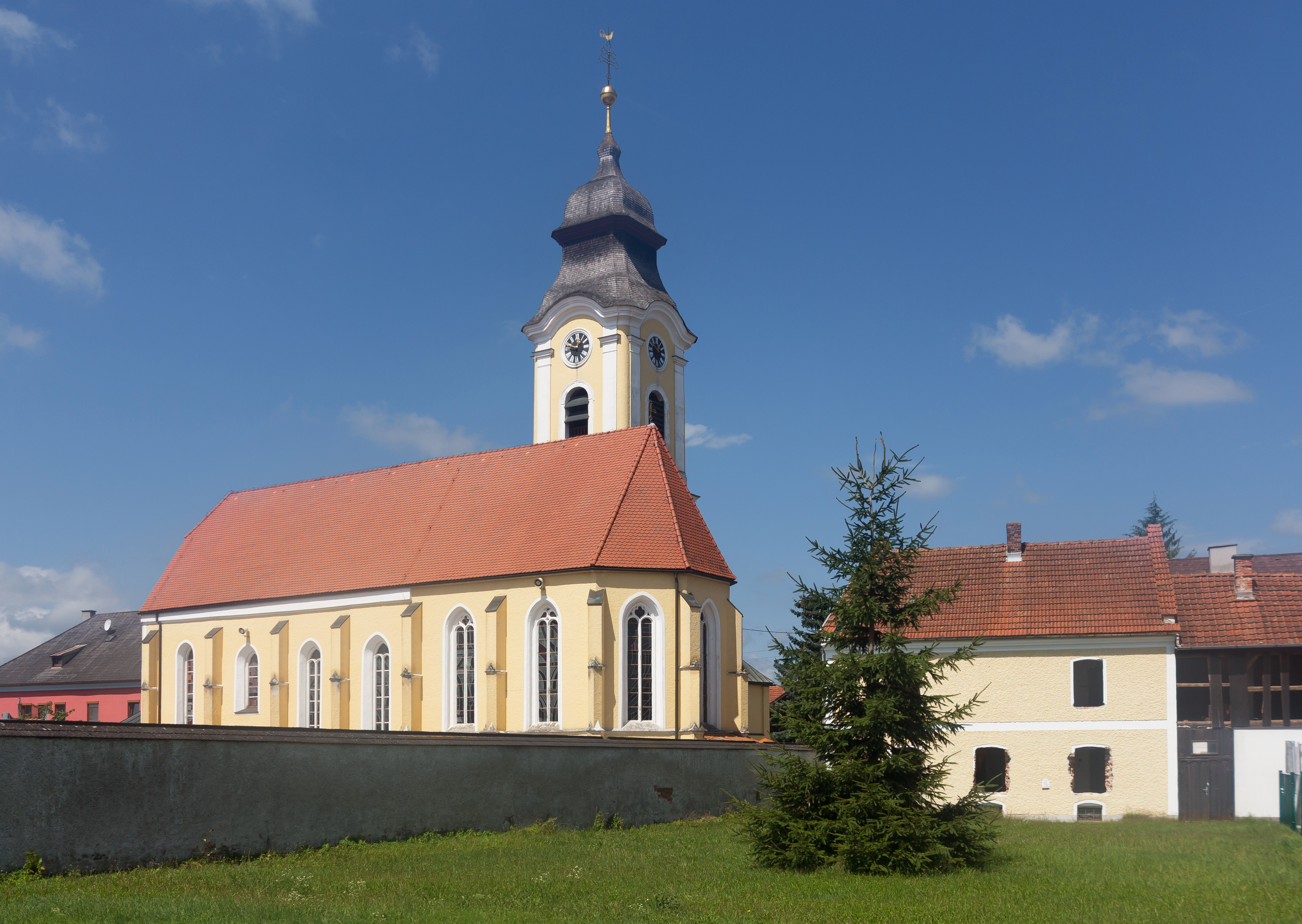

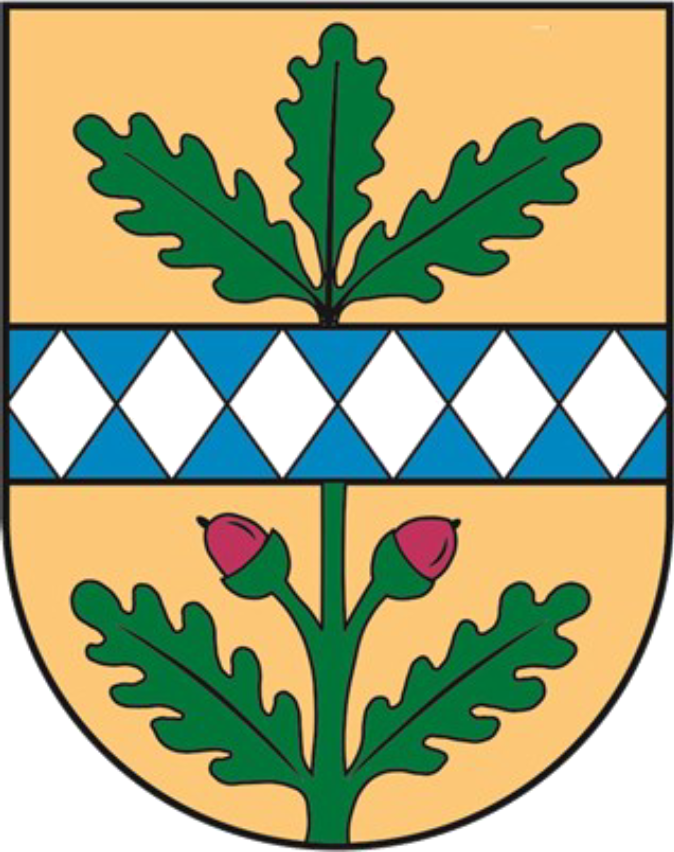
- Coat of arms

- Location within Austria
- Coordinates: 48°18′56″N 13°26′05″E
- Country: Austria
- State: Upper Austria
- District: Ried im Innkreis

Government
  - Mayor: Walter Reinthaler (ÖVP)

Area
  - Total: 11.51 km^{2} (4.44 sq mi)
- Elevation: 360 m (1,180 ft)

Population (2018-01-01)
  - Total: 1,275
  - Density: 110.8/km^{2} (286.9/sq mi)
- Time zone: UTC+1 (CET)
  - Summer (DST): UTC+2 (CEST)
- Postal code: 4974
- Area code: 07751
- Vehicle registration: RI
- Website: www.ort.ooe.gv.at

Ort im Innkreis is a municipality in the district of Ried im Innkreis in the Austrian state of Upper Austria.

== Geography ==
Ort lies in the Innviertel. About 15 percent of the municipality is forest, and 74 percent is farmland.
