= Obernberg am Inn =

- Municipality
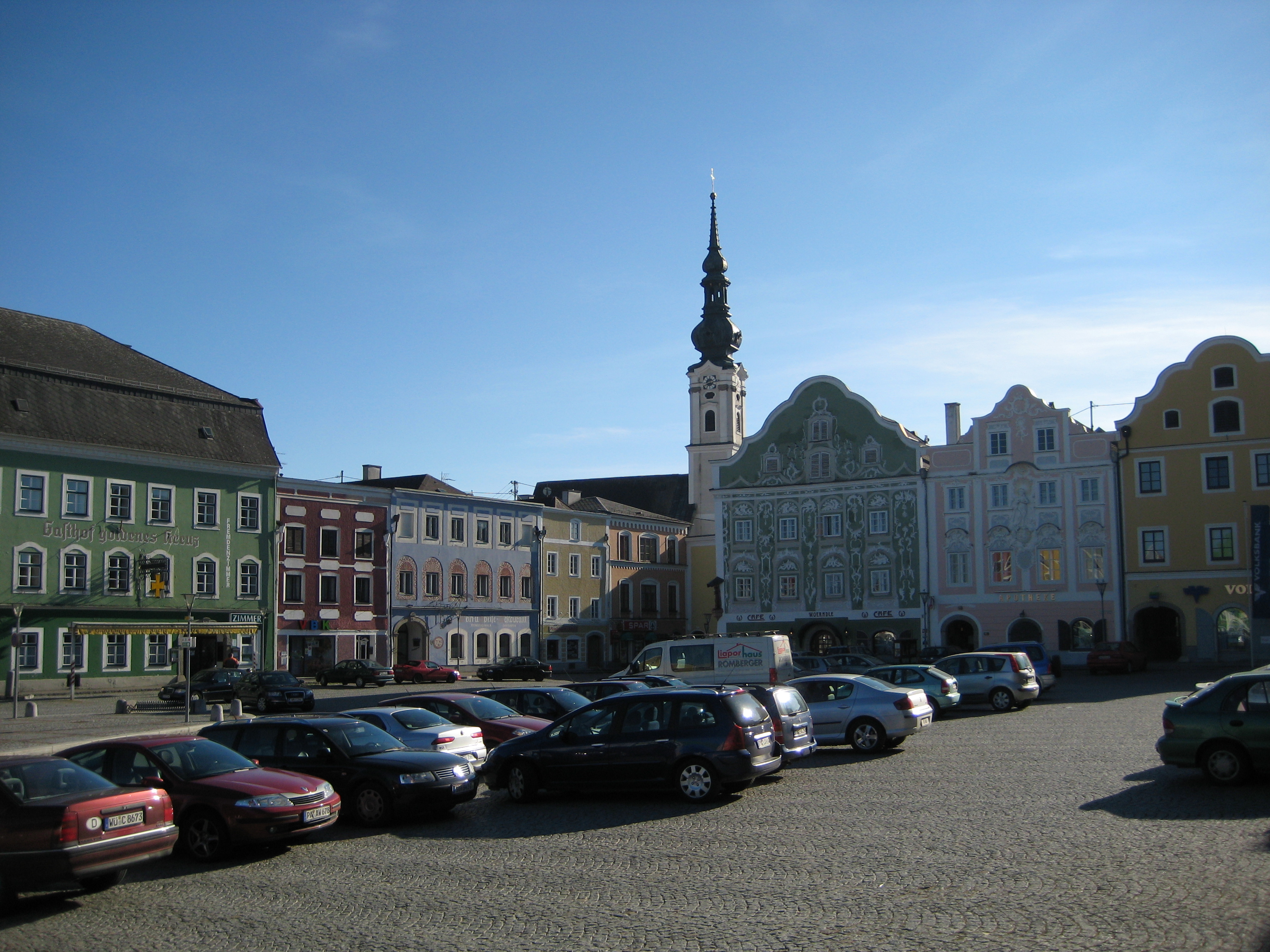

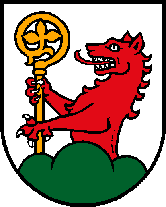
- Coat of arms

- Location within Austria
- Coordinates: 48°19′16″N 13°20′10″E
- Country: Austria
- State: Upper Austria
- District: Ried im Innkreis

Government
  - Mayor: Martin Bruckbauer (ÖVP)

Area
  - Total: 2.35 km^{2} (0.91 sq mi)
- Elevation: 354 m (1,161 ft)

Population (2018-01-01)
  - Total: 1,633
  - Density: 695/km^{2} (1,800/sq mi)
- Time zone: UTC+1 (CET)
  - Summer (DST): UTC+2 (CEST)
- Postal code: 4982
- Area code: 07758
- Vehicle registration: RI
- Website: www.obernberg.at

Obernberg am Inn is a municipality in the district of Ried im Innkreis in the Austrian state of Upper Austria.

== Geography ==
Obernberg lies in the Innviertel. About 9 percent of the municipality is forest, and 48 percent is farmland.
