= Geiersberg =

- Municipality
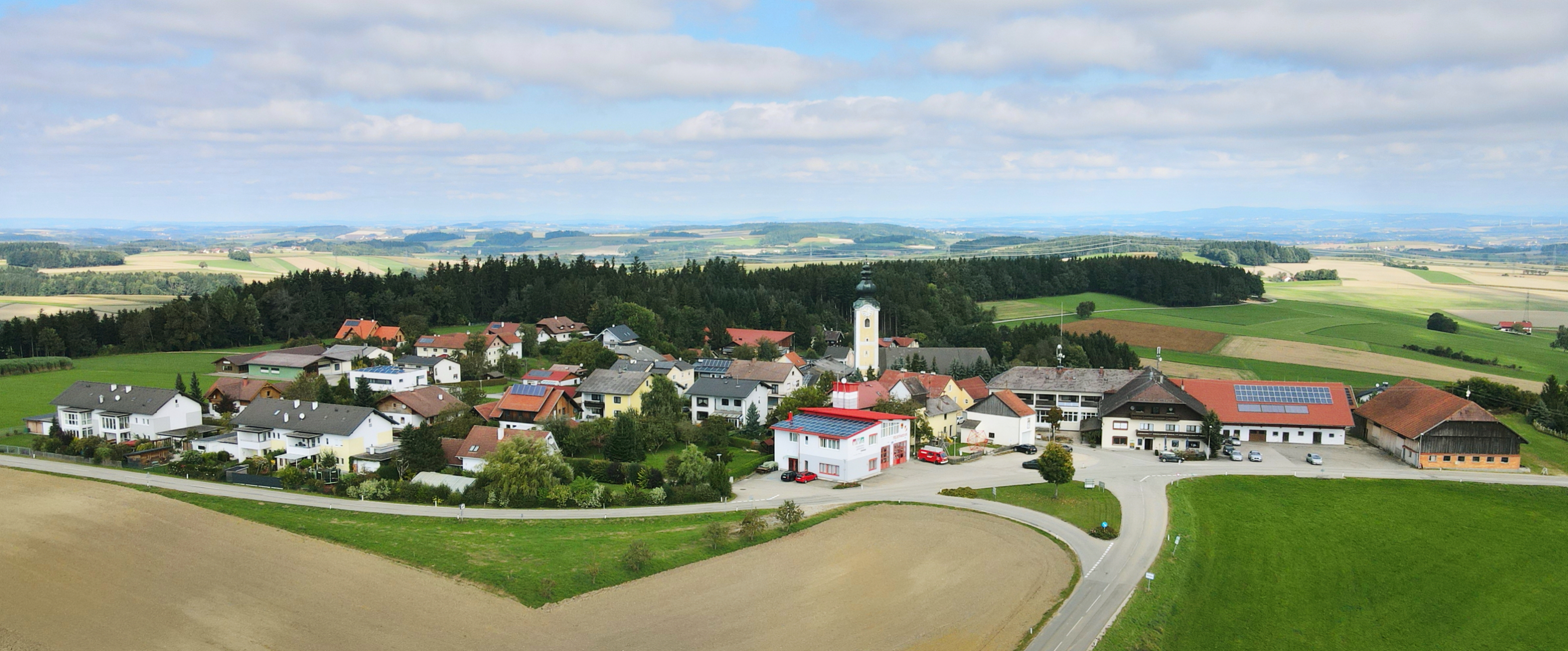
- Aerial view of Geiersberg

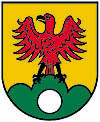
- Coat of arms

- Location within Austria
- Coordinates: 48°12′16″N 13°35′18″E
- Country: Austria
- State: Upper Austria
- District: Ried im Innkreis

Government
  - Mayor: Friedrich Hosner (SPÖ)

Area
  - Total: 5.45 km^{2} (2.10 sq mi)
- Elevation: 554 m (1,818 ft)

Population (2018-01-01)
  - Total: 519
  - Density: 95.2/km^{2} (247/sq mi)
- Time zone: UTC+1 (CET)
  - Summer (DST): UTC+2 (CEST)
- Postal code: 4922
- Area code: 07732
- Vehicle registration: RI
- Website: https://www.geiersberg.at/

Geiersberg is a municipality in the district of Ried im Innkreis in the Austrian state of Upper Austria.

== Population ==
Historical population
Year	Pop.	±%
1869	433	—
1880	439	+1.4%
1890	422	−3.9%
1900	434	+2.8%
1910	479	+10.4%
1923	471	−1.7%
1934	458	−2.8%
1939	464	+1.3%
1951	479	+3.2%
1961	472	−1.5%
1971	494	+4.7%
1981	520	+5.3%
1991	485	−6.7%
2001	539	+11.1%
2013	533	−1.1%
