= Tumeltsham =

- Municipality
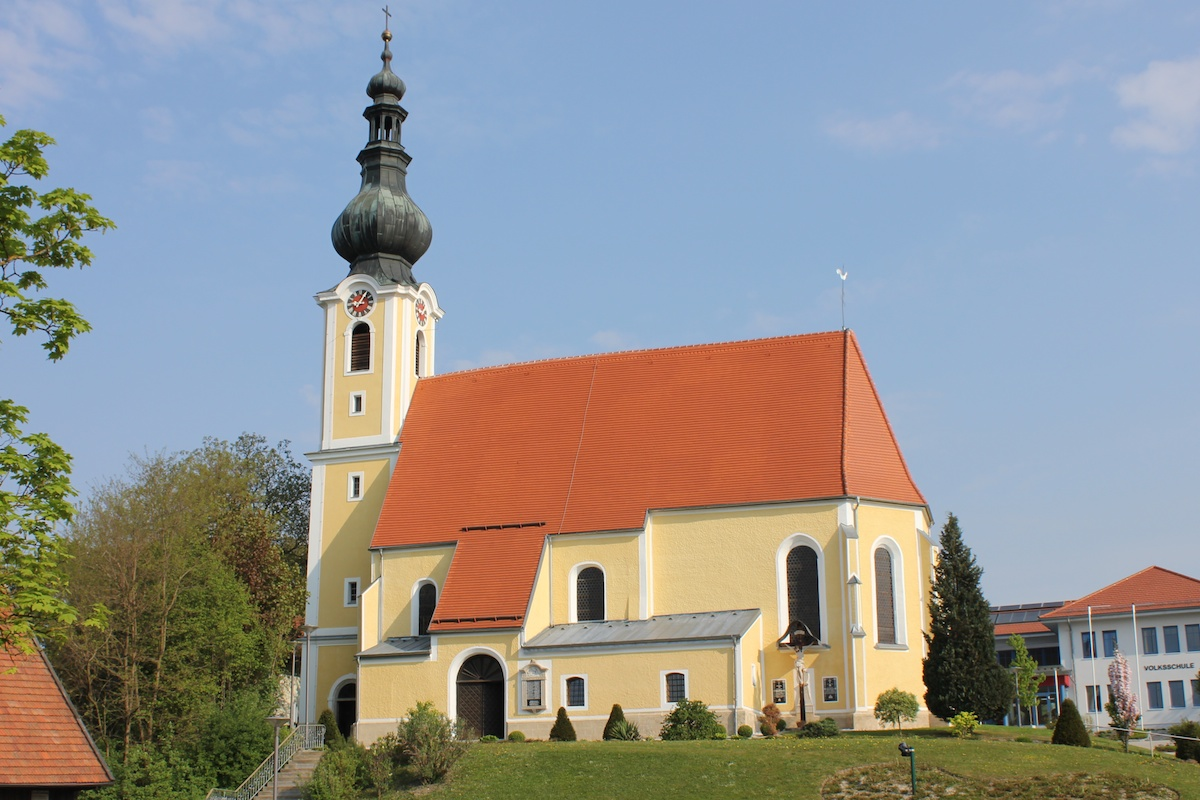

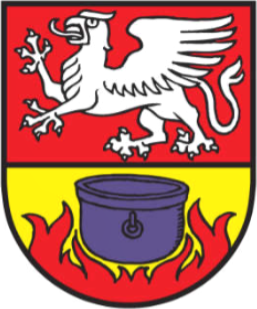
- Coat of arms

- Location within Austria
- Coordinates: 48°13′55″N 13°29′52″E
- Country: Austria
- State: Upper Austria
- District: Ried im Innkreis

Government
  - Mayor: Erwin Diermayer (ÖVP)

Area
  - Total: 9.11 km^{2} (3.52 sq mi)
- Elevation: 438 m (1,437 ft)

Population (2018-01-01)
  - Total: 1,590
  - Density: 175/km^{2} (452/sq mi)
- Time zone: UTC+1 (CET)
  - Summer (DST): UTC+2 (CEST)
- Postal code: 4911
- Area code: +43 7752
- Vehicle registration: RI
- Website: www.tumeltsham.at

Tumeltsham is a municipality in the district of Ried im Innkreis in the Austrian state of Upper Austria.

== Geography ==
Tumeltsham lies in the Innviertel. About 9 percent of the municipality is forest, and 74 percent is farmland.
