= Mehrnbach =

- Municipality
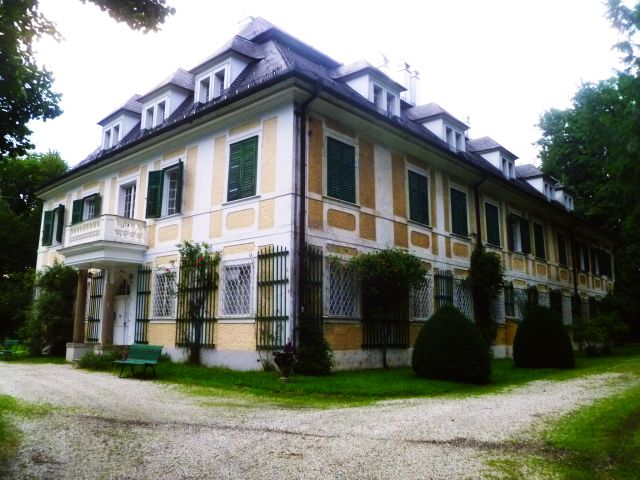
- Riegerting palace

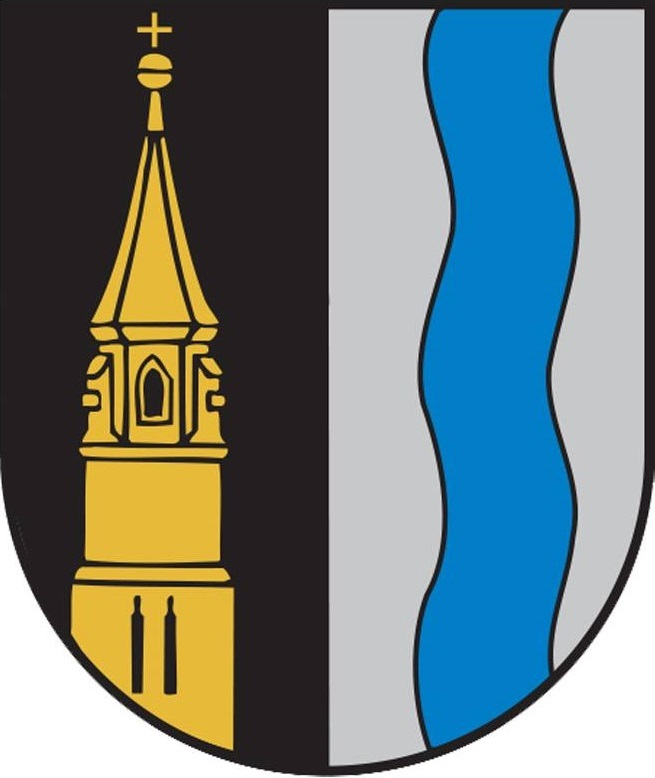
- Coat of arms

- Location within Austria
- Coordinates: 48°12′32″N 13°26′11″E
- Country: Austria
- State: Upper Austria
- District: Ried im Innkreis

Government
  - Mayor: Peter Bahn (FPÖ)

Area
  - Total: 22.21 km^{2} (8.58 sq mi)
- Elevation: 443 m (1,453 ft)

Population (2018-01-01)
  - Total: 2,363
  - Density: 106.4/km^{2} (275.6/sq mi)
- Time zone: UTC+1 (CET)
  - Summer (DST): UTC+2 (CEST)
- Postal code: A-4941
- Area code: +43 7752
- Website: www.mehrnbach.at

Mehrnbach is a municipality in Upper Austria. It is situated in the district of Ried im Innkreis in the Innviertel.

== Geography ==
Mehrnbach is situated 443 m above sea level in the Innviertel. Its dimensions are 6.2 km from the North to the South and 6.5 km from the West to the East. The complete area accounts for 22.2 km². 14.9% of the land is afforested, whilst 73.9% is used agriculturally. Parts of the municipality are Abstätten, Aich, Asenham, Atzing, Aubach, Aubachberg, Baching, Bubesting, Dopplhub, Fritzging, Gigling, Käfermühl, Langdorf, Mehrnbach, Probenzing, Renetsham, Riegerting, Sieber, Stötten, Steinbach, Thaling, and Zimetsberg.

== Coat of arms ==
The official description of the coat of arms (translation): Split; to the right in black a golden church tower, which comes out of the shield bottom, with two square basements, one octagonal upper floor with abutments, and an octagonal pitched roof, crowned with bowl and cross, the floors separated by cornices, in the lowest floor two rectangular apertures, in the upper floor one lancet arched window; to the left in silver a blue wavy pile. The municipal colours are white and blue.

== History ==
From the foundation of the Bavarian dukedom the city belonged to Bavaria until 1780. Together with the Innviertel (formerly known as "Innbaiern") it was ceded to Austria after the Treaty of Teschen. During the French Revolutionary Wars it became Bavarian again, in 1814 it became part of Upper Austria to whom it has belonged up to the present day. After the Anschluß to the German Reich on March 13, 1938 the city was part of the "Gau Oberdonau". After 1945 the restitution of Upper Austria took place.

== Population ==
Historical population
Year	Pop.	±%
1869	1,754	—
1880	1,620	−7.6%
1890	1,729	+6.7%
1900	1,669	−3.5%
1910	1,739	+4.2%
1923	1,794	+3.2%
1934	1,805	+0.6%
1939	1,606	−11.0%
1951	1,831	+14.0%
1961	1,668	−8.9%
1971	1,950	+16.9%
1981	2,075	+6.4%
1991	2,079	+0.2%
2001	2,302	+10.7%
2013	2,285	−0.7%
