= Andrichsfurt =

- Municipality
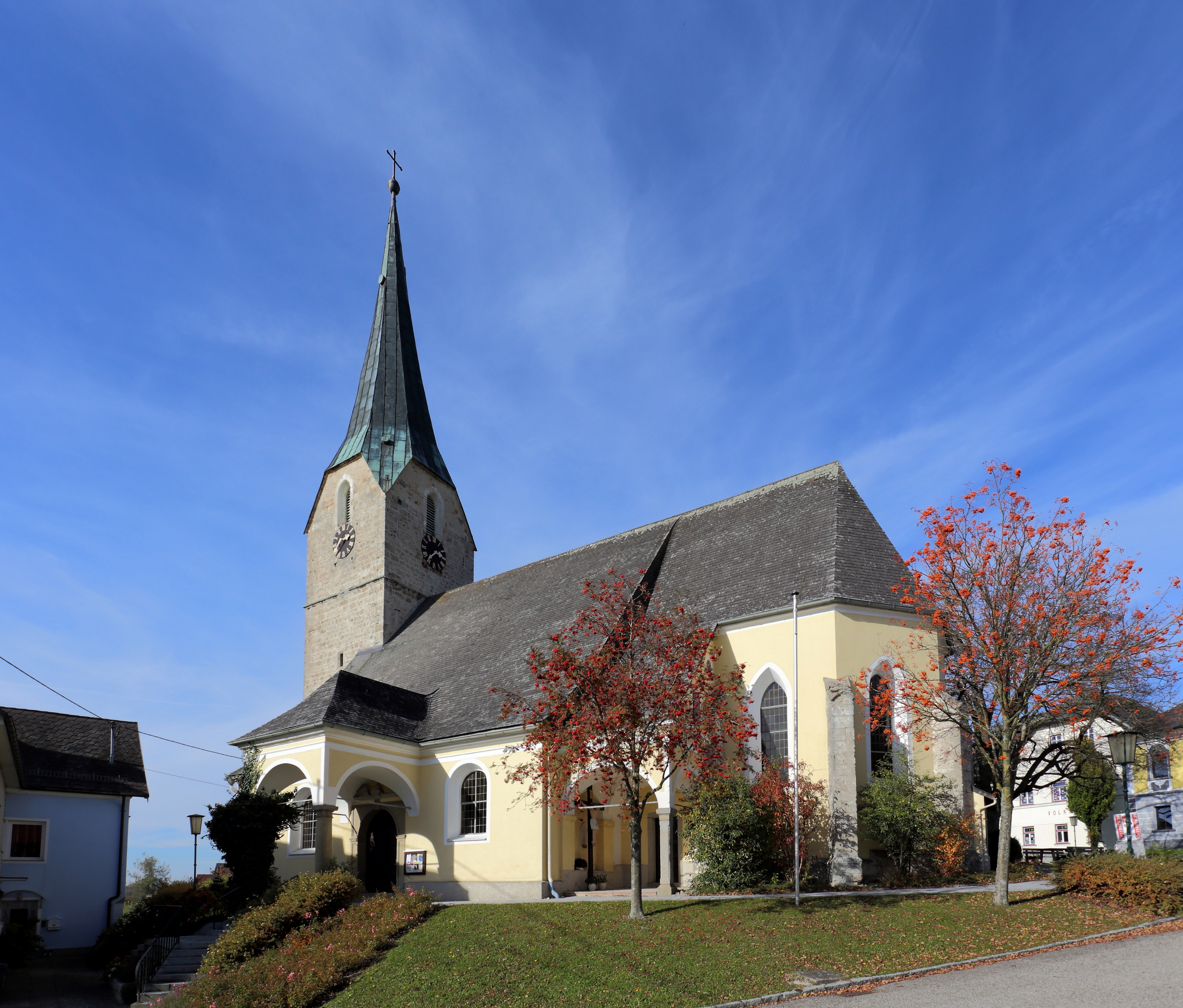

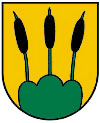
- Coat of arms

- Location within Austria
- Coordinates: 48°15′54″N 13°31′26″E
- Country: Austria
- State: Upper Austria
- District: Ried im Innkreis

Government
  - Mayor: Johann Brandstetter (ÖVP)

Area
  - Total: 12.35 km^{2} (4.77 sq mi)
- Elevation: 440 m (1,440 ft)

Population (2018-01-01)
  - Total: 770
  - Density: 62/km^{2} (160/sq mi)
- Time zone: UTC+1 (CET)
  - Summer (DST): UTC+2 (CEST)
- Postal code: 4754
- Area code: 07750
- Vehicle registration: RI
- Website: Gemeinde Andrichsfurt

Andrichsfurt is a municipality in the district of Ried im Innkreis in the Austrian state of Upper Austria.

== Population ==
Historical population
Year	Pop.	±%
1869	745	—
1880	716	−3.9%
1890	683	−4.6%
1900	667	−2.3%
1910	696	+4.3%
1923	752	+8.0%
1934	729	−3.1%
1939	655	−10.2%
1951	751	+14.7%
1961	670	−10.8%
1971	701	+4.6%
1981	707	+0.9%
1991	710	+0.4%
2001	724	+2.0%
2013	712	−1.7%
