= Weilbach, Austria =

Weilbach
- Municipality
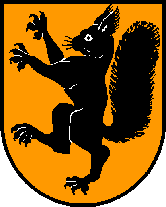
- Coat of arms

- Location within Austria
- Coordinates: 48°16′39″N 13°22′24″E
- Country: Austria
- State: Upper Austria
- District: Ried im Innkreis

Government
  - Mayor: Ludwig Huber (ÖVP)

Area
  - Total: 13.5 km^{2} (5.2 sq mi)
- Elevation: 386 m (1,266 ft)

Population (2018-01-01)
  - Total: 604
  - Density: 44.7/km^{2} (116/sq mi)
- Time zone: UTC+1 (CET)
  - Summer (DST): UTC+2 (CEST)
- Postal code: 4984
- Area code: 07757
- Vehicle registration: RI
- Website: www.weilbach.at

Weilbach (German pronunciation: [ˈvaɪlbax]) is a municipality in the district of Ried im Innkreis in the Austrian state of Upper Austria.

== Geography ==
Weilbach lies in the Innviertel. About 16 percent of the municipality is forest, and 75 percent is farmland.
