= St. Martin im Innkreis =

- Municipality
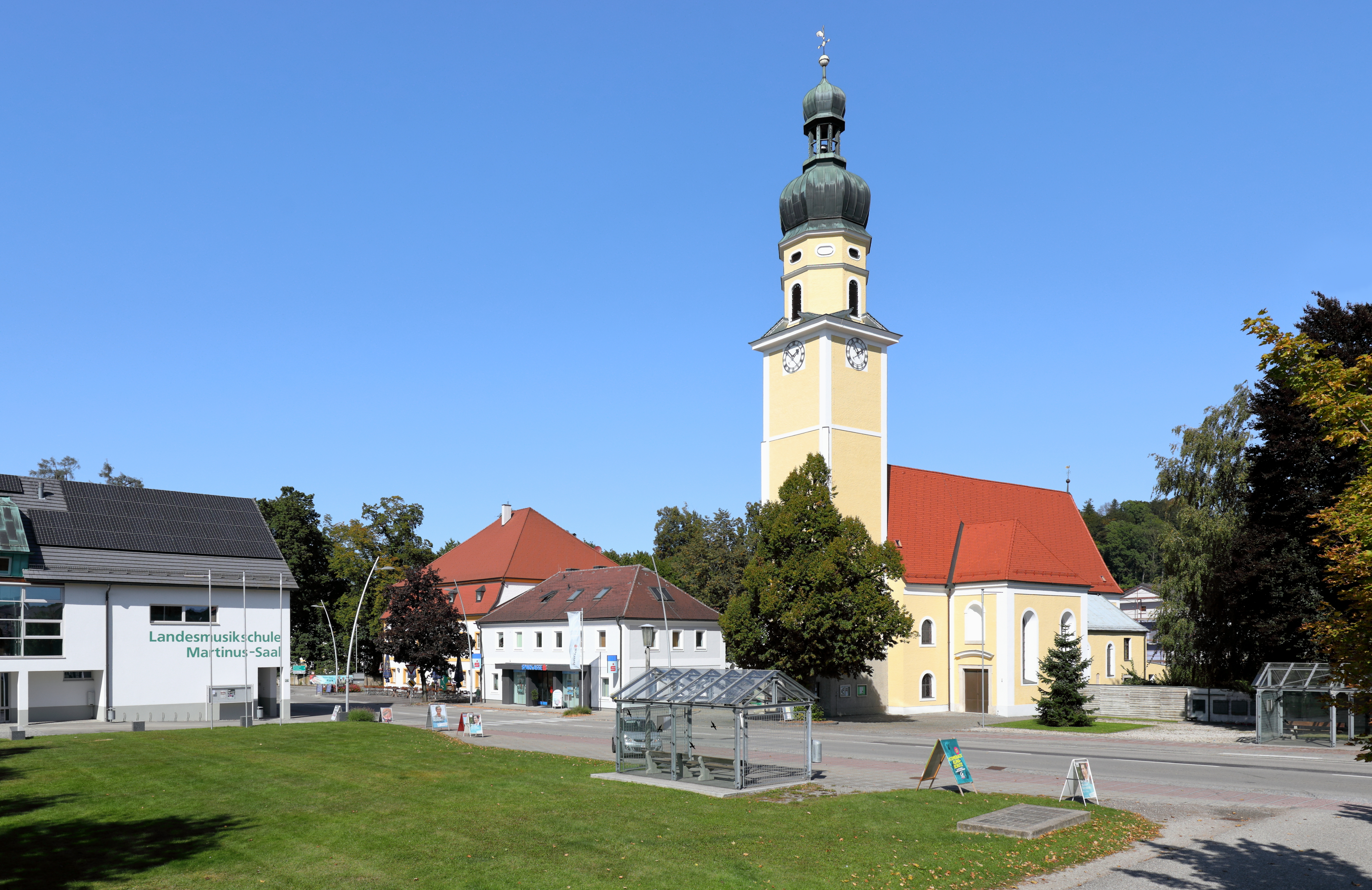
- Parish church

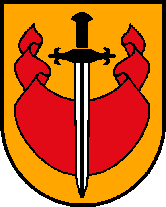
- Coat of arms

- Location within Austria
- Coordinates: 48°17′39″N 13°26′25″E
- Country: Austria
- State: Upper Austria
- District: Ried

Government
  - Mayor: Kurt Höretzeder (FPÖ)

Area
  - Total: 8.88 km^{2} (3.43 sq mi)
- Elevation: 372 m (1,220 ft)

Population (2018-01-01)
  - Total: 2,055
  - Density: 231/km^{2} (599/sq mi)
- Time zone: UTC+1 (CET)
  - Summer (DST): UTC+2 (CEST)
- Postal code: 4973
- Area code: +43 7751
- Vehicle registration: RI
- Website: www.st-martin-innkreis.ooe.gv.at

St. Martin im Innkreis is a municipality in Ried District, in the Austrian state of Upper Austria.

== Geography ==
St. Martin lies in the Innviertel (Innkreis) region, situated on the west slope of the Troßkolm forest in the Antiesen valley. It is located about 10 kilometres (6.2 mi) north of the district capital Ried im Innkreis on the Hausruck Straße highway (B143) near the Ort im Innkreis junction of the Innkreis Autobahn (A8).

The municipal area comprises the cadastral communities of Diesseits and Jenseits (literally "On This Side" and "Beyond"), referring to the Antiesen River.

== History ==
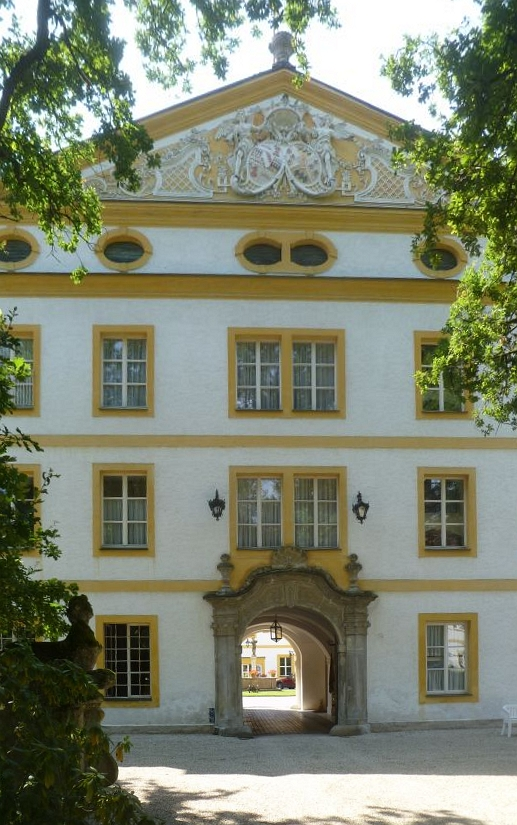
Castle

The Sankt Martin parish church was first mentioned in a 1084 deed, when the surrounding estates were held by the Bavarian Bishops of Passau. A castle was mentioned in 1150, it burnt down during the Peasants' War in Upper Austria in 1626 and was rebuilt in a Baroque style.

With the whole Innviertel region Sankt Martin belonged to the Duchy of Bavaria (Electorate from 1623) until it was ceded to the Archduchy of Austria according to the 1779 Treaty of Teschen. After the Napoleonic Wars, Sankt Martin was incorporated into the Austrian crown land of Upper Austria. The present-day municipality was established in 1850.

In World War II Oberst Alois Podhajsky, director of the Spanish Riding School in Vienna, had most of the Lipizzan stallions evacuated to St. Martin. His hostess was at that time the Swedish born Countess Gertrud Arco- auf Valley - Wallenberg (1895–1983), alias Gertrud ”Calle” Wallenberg. She has been a member of the Swedish banking dynasty, and cousin of anti-Nazi hero Raoul Wallenberg. There Oberst Podhajsky met on the seventh of May 1945 with the American General George S. Patton and Robert Porter Patterson, Sr. the United States Under Secretary of War under President Franklin Roosevelt and the United States Secretary of War under President Harry S. Truman. The remaining horses and riders of the school orchestrated an impressive performance in the indoor school of the castle for their foreign guests, whereafter the Americans agreed to place the white stallions under the protection of the United States.

== Politics ==
Seats in the municipal assembly (Gemeinderat) as of 2009 local elections:

- Freedom Party of Austria (FPÖ): 7
- Austrian People's Party (ÖVP): 7
- Social Democratic Party of Austria (SPÖ): 5

== Notable people ==
- Anton Graf von Arco auf Valley (1897–1945), political activist, assassin of Bavarian premier Kurt Eisner.
