= St. Marienkirchen am Hausruck =

- Municipality
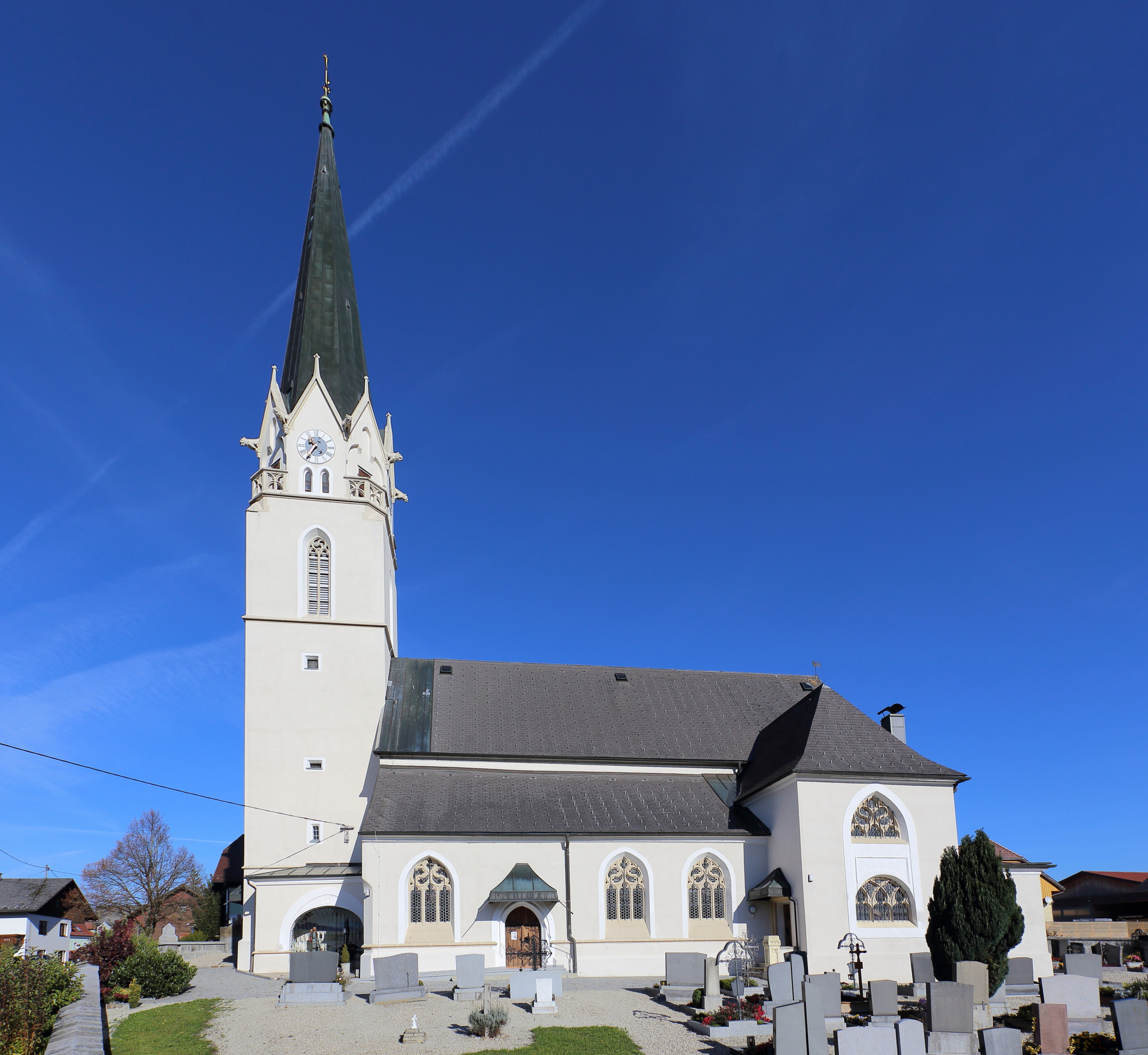

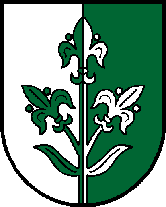
- Coat of arms

- Location within Austria
- Coordinates: 48°10′55″N 13°34′50″E
- Country: Austria
- State: Upper Austria
- District: Ried

Government
  - Mayor: Roland Bergthal (ÖVP)

Area
  - Total: 10.94 km^{2} (4.22 sq mi)
- Elevation: 523 m (1,716 ft)

Population (2018-01-01)
  - Total: 888
  - Density: 81.2/km^{2} (210/sq mi)
- Time zone: UTC+1 (CET)
  - Summer (DST): UTC+2 (CEST)
- Postal code: 4926
- Area code: +43 7753
- Vehicle registration: RI

St. Marienkirchen am Hausruck is a municipality in the district of Ried in the Austrian state of Upper Austria.

== Geography ==
St. Marienkirchen lies in the Innviertel. About 18 percent of the municipality is forest, and 74 percent is farmland.

As of 1 January 2018 the municipality contained the following settlements:

- Baching 64
- Grausgrub 58
- Hatting 99
- Hof 63
- Jetzing 36
- Manaberg 12
- Obereselbach 38
- Pilgersham 79
- St. Marienkirchen am Hausruck 292
- Stocket 52
- Unering 46
- Untereselbach 18
- Kern 17
- Lehen 12
- Kleinbach 2.
