= Wippenham =

- Municipality
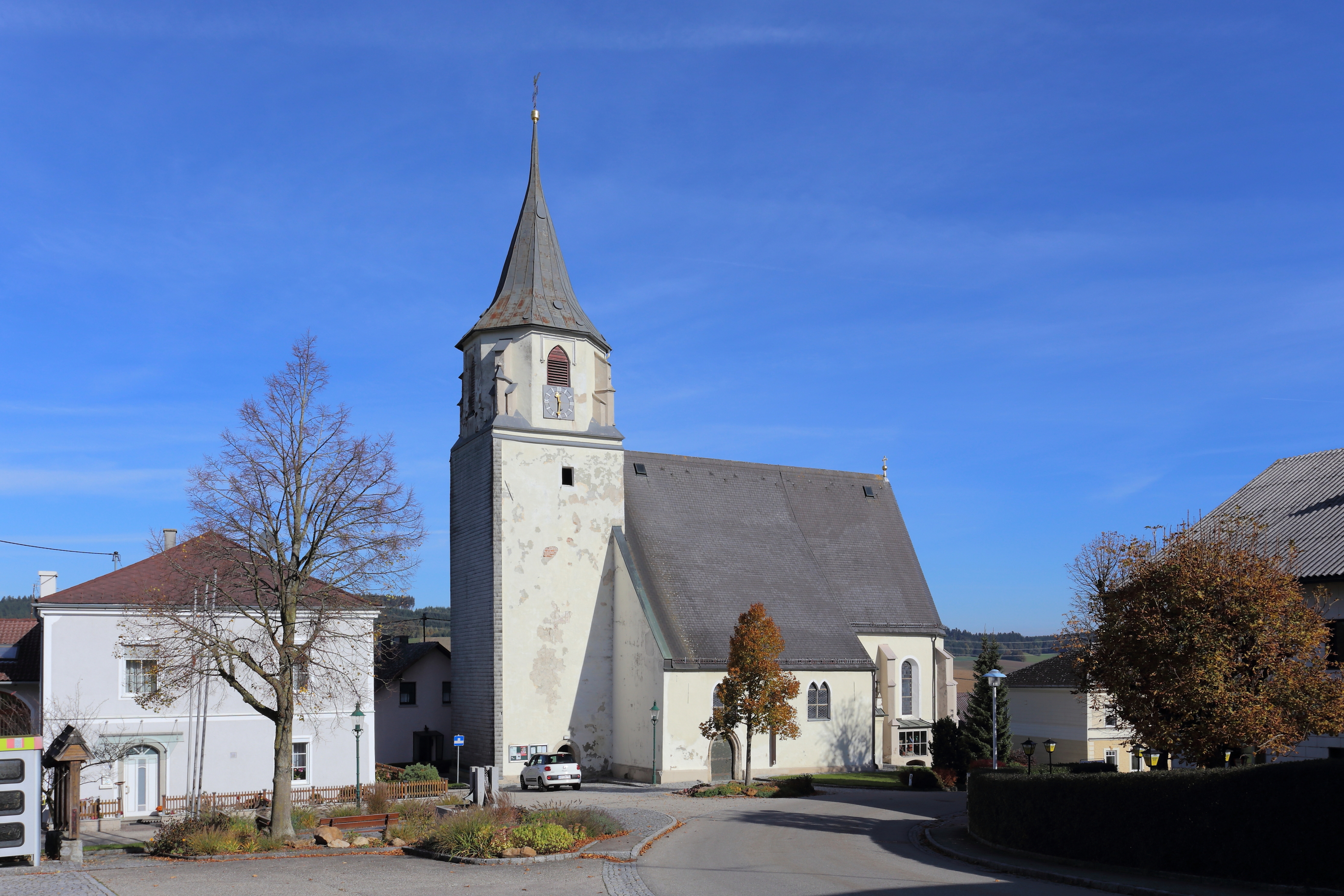

- Coat of arms

- Location within Austria
- Coordinates: 48°13′18″N 13°22′56″E
- Country: Austria
- State: Upper Austria
- District: Ried im Innkreis

Government
  - Mayor: Johann Reischauer (ÖVP)

Area
  - Total: 8.08 km^{2} (3.12 sq mi)
- Elevation: 450 m (1,480 ft)

Population (2018-01-01)
  - Total: 578
  - Density: 71.5/km^{2} (185/sq mi)
- Time zone: UTC+1 (CET)
  - Summer (DST): UTC+2 (CEST)
- Postal code: 4942
- Area code: 07757
- Vehicle registration: RI

Wippenham is a municipality in the district of Ried im Innkreis in the Austrian state of Upper Austria.

== Geography ==
Wippenham lies in the Innviertel. About 22 percent of the municipality is forest, and 68 percent is farmland.
