= Pattigham =

- Municipality
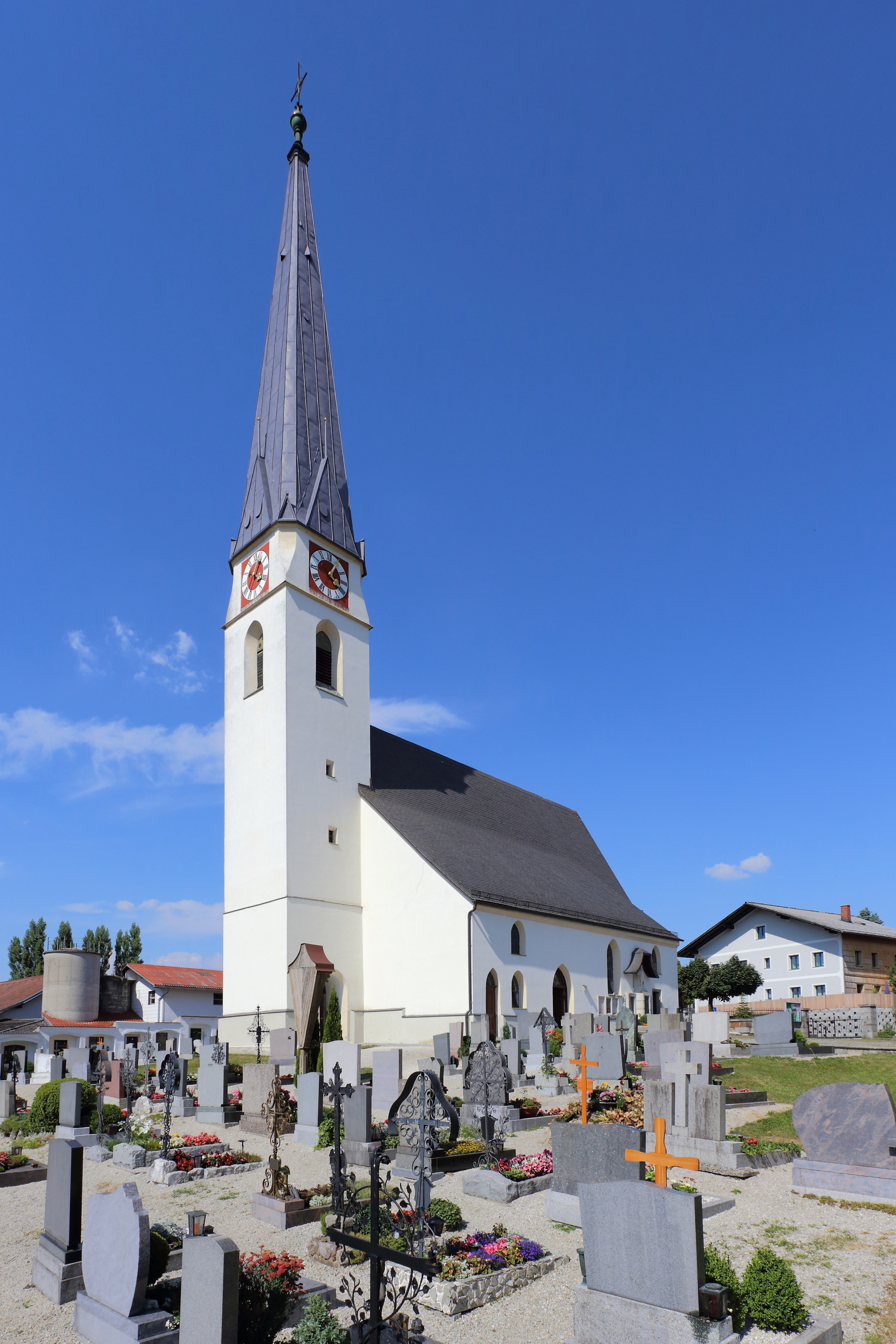

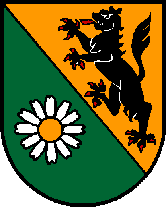
- Coat of arms

- Location within Austria
- Coordinates: 48°09′19″N 13°29′05″E
- Country: Austria
- State: Upper Austria
- District: Ried im Innkreis

Government
  - Mayor: Franz Moser (ÖVP)

Area
  - Total: 11.32 km^{2} (4.37 sq mi)
- Elevation: 512 m (1,680 ft)

Population (2018-01-01)
  - Total: 928
  - Density: 82.0/km^{2} (212/sq mi)
- Time zone: UTC+1 (CET)
  - Summer (DST): UTC+2 (CEST)
- Postal code: 4910
- Area code: 07754
- Vehicle registration: RI
- Website: www.oberoesterreich. at/pattigham

Pattigham is a municipality in the district of Ried im Innkreis in the Austrian state of Upper Austria.

== Geography ==
Pattigham lies in the Innviertel. About 15 percent of the municipality is forest, and 77 percent is farmland.
