= Mörschwang =

- Municipality
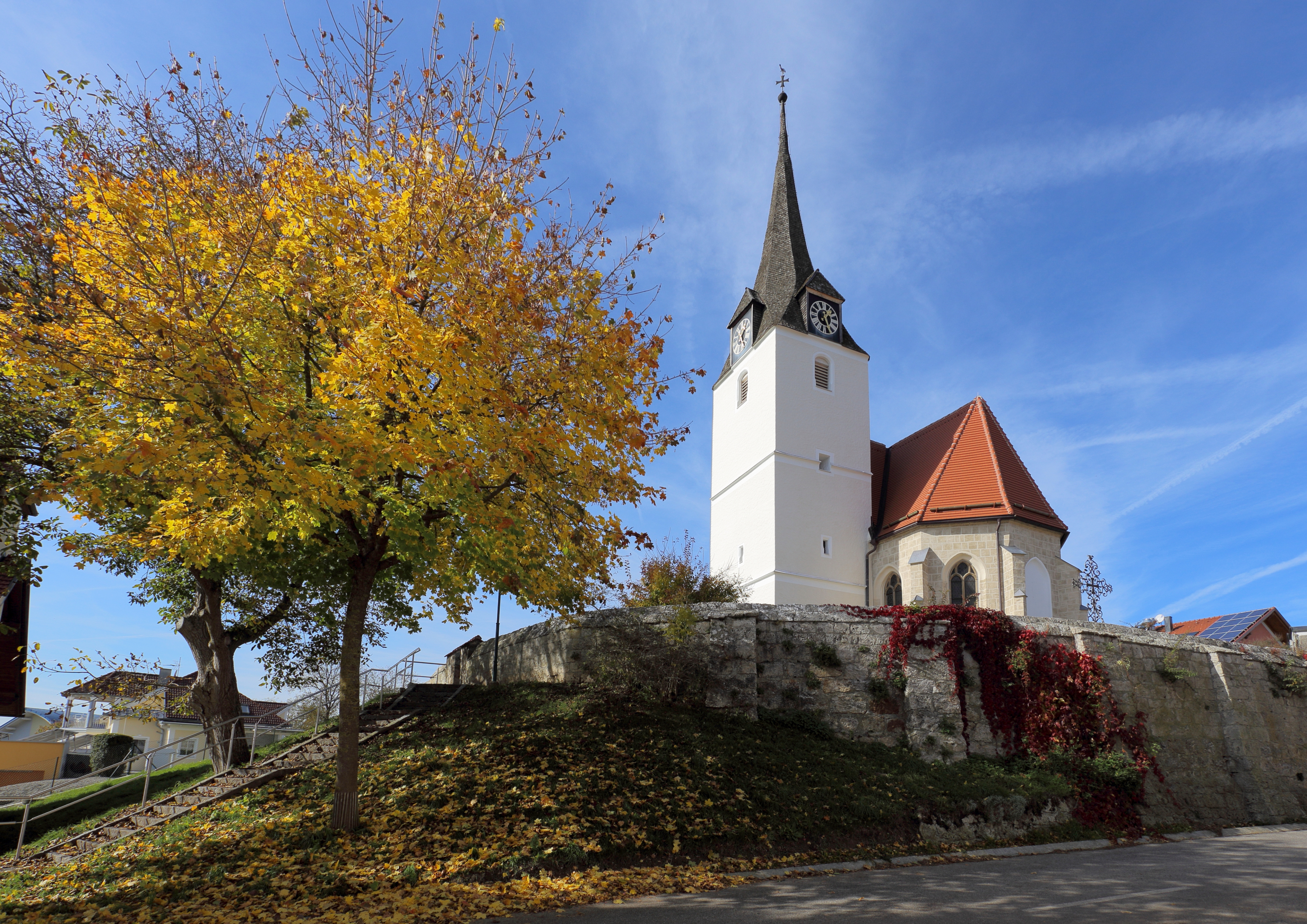

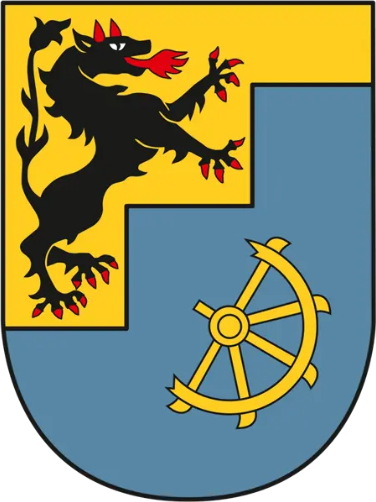
- Coat of arms

- Location within Austria
- Coordinates: 48°18′14″N 13°21′57″E
- Country: Austria
- State: Upper Austria
- District: Ried im Innkreis

Government
  - Mayor: Bernhard Schachinger (ÖVP)

Area
  - Total: 11.01 km^{2} (4.25 sq mi)
- Elevation: 383 m (1,257 ft)

Population (2018-01-01)
  - Total: 328
  - Density: 29.8/km^{2} (77.2/sq mi)
- Time zone: UTC+1 (CET)
  - Summer (DST): UTC+2 (CEST)
- Postal code: 4982
- Area code: 07758
- Vehicle registration: RI

Mörschwang is a municipality in the district of Ried im Innkreis in the Austrian state of Upper Austria.

== Geography ==
Mörschwang lies in the Innviertel. About 22 percent of the municipality is forest, and 69 percent is farmland.
