= Peterskirchen =

- Municipality
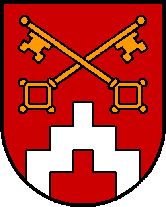
- Coat of arms

- Location within Austria
- Coordinates: 48°14′18″N 13°32′52″E
- Country: Austria
- State: Upper Austria
- District: Ried im Innkreis

Government
  - Mayor: Stefan Majer (ÖVP)

Area
  - Total: 10.25 km^{2} (3.96 sq mi)
- Elevation: 441 m (1,447 ft)

Population (2018-01-01)
  - Total: 700
  - Density: 68/km^{2} (180/sq mi)
- Time zone: UTC+1 (CET)
  - Summer (DST): UTC+2 (CEST)
- Postal code: 4743
- Area code: 07750
- Vehicle registration: RI
- Website: www.peterskirchen.at

Peterskirchen is a municipality in the district of Ried im Innkreis in the Austrian state of Upper Austria.

== Geography ==
Peterskirchen lies in the Innviertel. About 11 percent of the municipality is forest, and 80 percent is farmland.

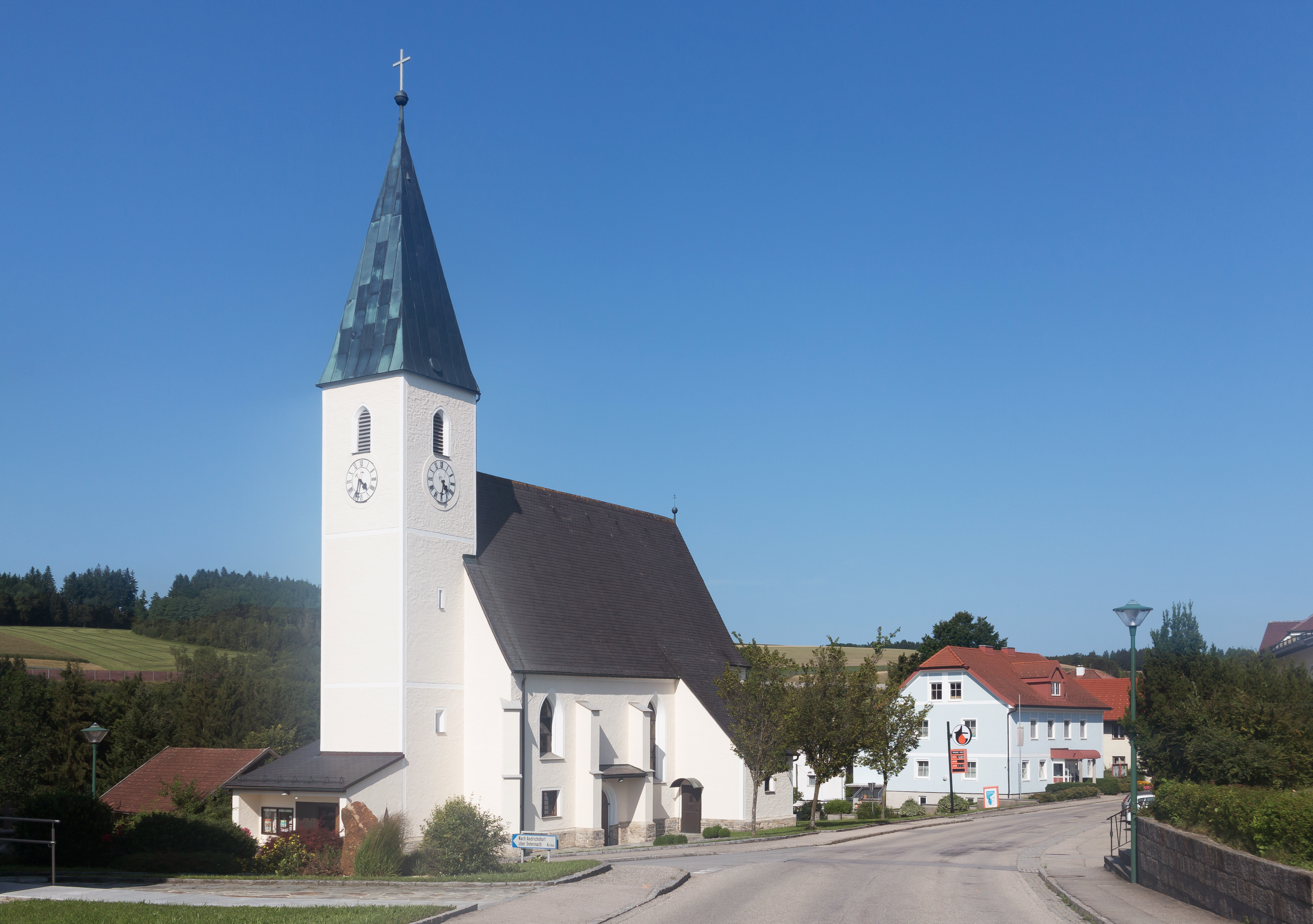
Peterskirchen, church: die Katholische Pfarrkirche heilige Peter und Paul

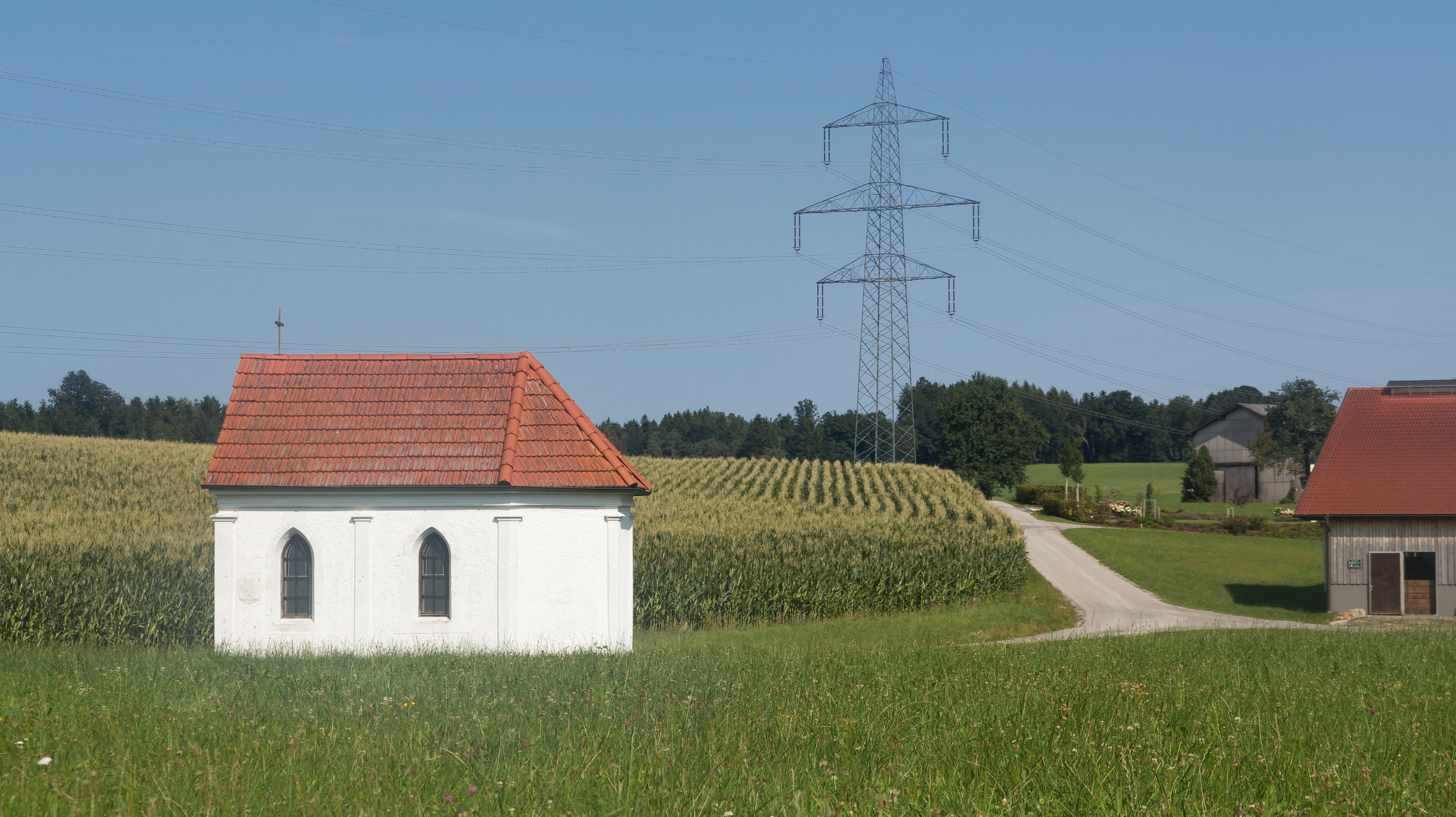
Eschlried, chapel
