= Taiskirchen im Innkreis =

- Municipality
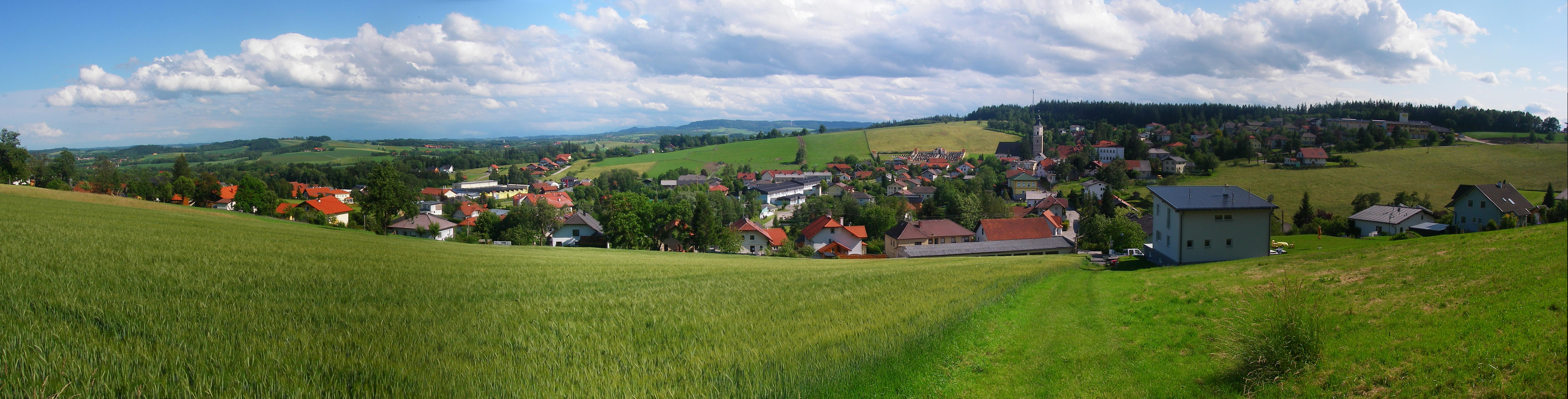

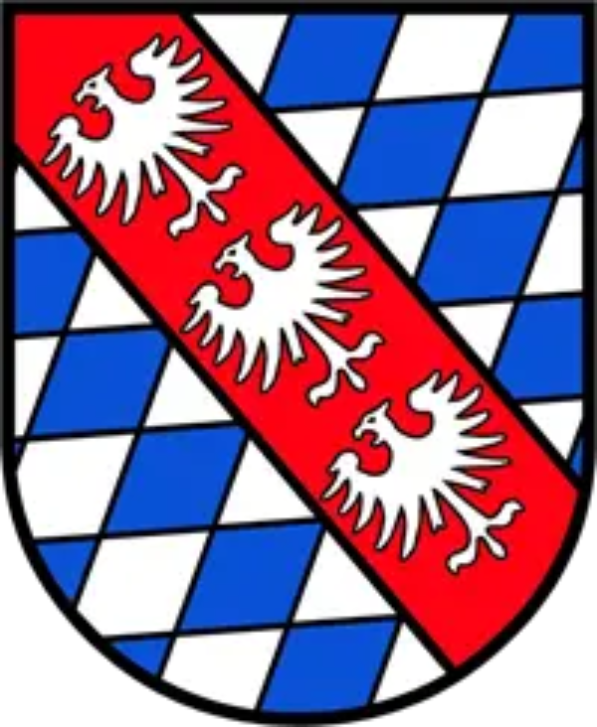
- Coat of arms

- Location within Austria
- Coordinates: 48°15′49″N 13°34′25″E
- Country: Austria
- State: Upper Austria
- District: Ried im Innkreis

Government
  - Mayor: Johann Weirathmüller (ÖVP)

Area
  - Total: 34.52 km^{2} (13.33 sq mi)
- Elevation: 475 m (1,558 ft)

Population (2018-01-01)
  - Total: 2,407
  - Density: 69.73/km^{2} (180.6/sq mi)
- Time zone: UTC+1 (CET)
  - Summer (DST): UTC+2 (CEST)
- Postal code: 4753
- Area code: 07764, 07765, 07750
- Vehicle registration: RI
- Website: www.taiskirchen.at

Taiskirchen im Innkreis (Austro-Bavarian: Tåskira / German: Taiskirchen im Innkreis) is a municipality in the district of Ried im Innkreis in the Austrian state of Upper Austria.

Parts of the municipality are Aichet, Altmannsdorf, Arling, Baumgarten, Brandstätten, Breitenried, Bruckleiten, Edtleiten, Ellerbach, Flohleiten, Gansing, Gotthalmsedt, Günzing, Helfingsdorf, Hohenerlach, Jebing, Jedretsberg, Kainzing, Kleingaisbach, Kühdobl, Lacken, Lindet, Petersham, Schatzdorf, Sittling, Taiskirchen im Innkreis, Tiefenbach, Unterbreitenried, Wiesenberg, Wietraun, Wohleiten, Wolfsedt, and Zahra.

== History ==
Until 1780 the village was Bavarian. Since the Treaty of Teschen, it has belonged to Austria. In the Napoleonic Wars it was briefly Bavarian again, but since 1814 it has belonged to Upper Austria.

Since 1990 Taiskirchen has been a market town.

== Culture and music ==
The local brass band was founded in 1849 by Joseph Gramberger with 14 musicians. Now 60 people are members of the band.

There are two choirs and a theater group.

== Politics ==
Johann Weirathmüller of the Austrian People's Party is mayor.
