= Schildorn =

- Municipality
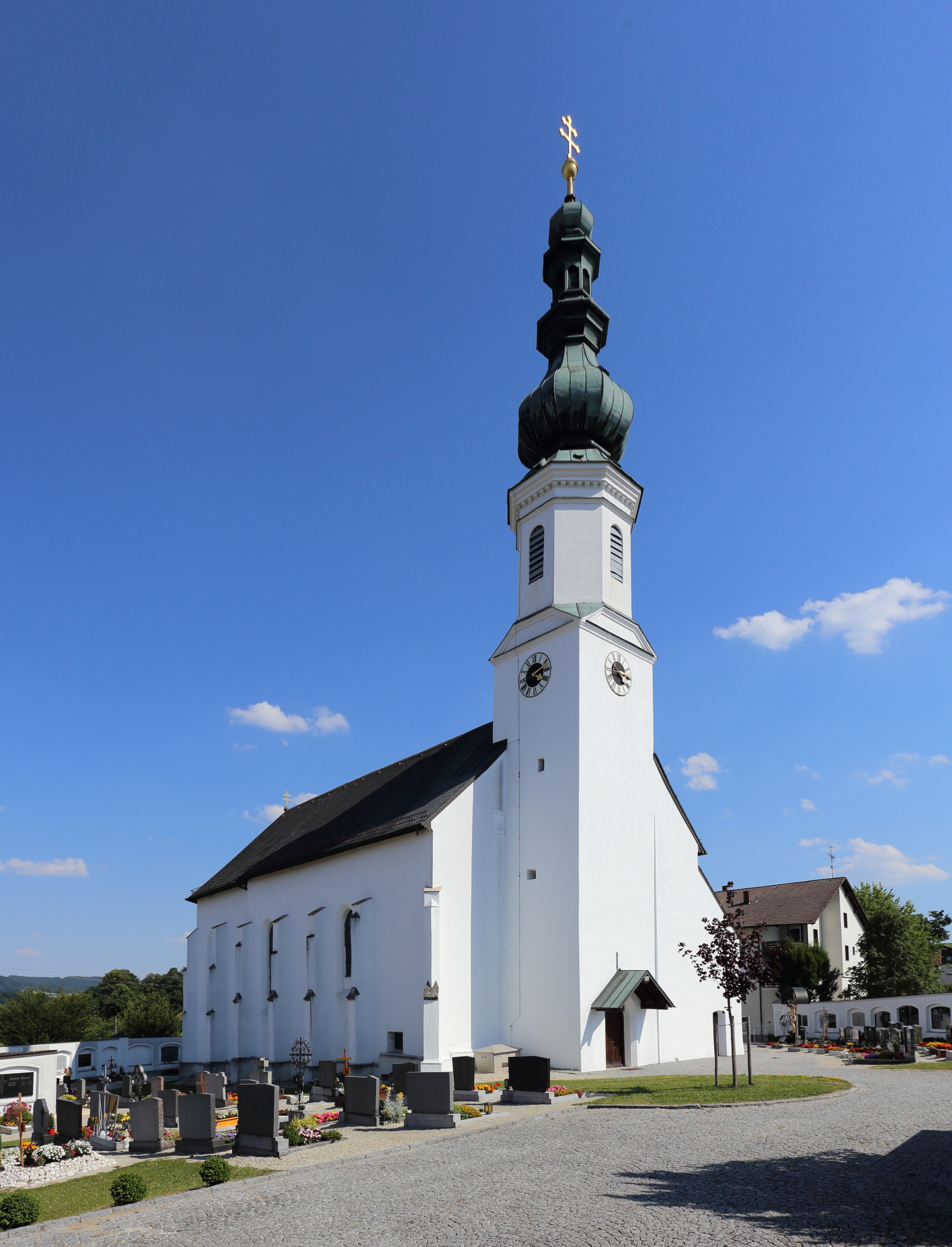

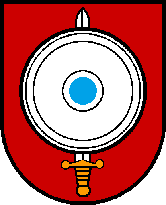
- Coat of arms

- Location within Austria
- Coordinates: 48°08′46″N 13°27′57″E
- Country: Austria
- State: Upper Austria
- District: Ried im Innkreis

Government
  - Mayor: Georg Schoibl (ÖVP)

Area
  - Total: 13.28 km^{2} (5.13 sq mi)
- Elevation: 520 m (1,710 ft)

Population (2018-01-01)
  - Total: 1,227
  - Density: 92.39/km^{2} (239.3/sq mi)
- Time zone: UTC+1 (CET)
  - Summer (DST): UTC+2 (CEST)
- Postal code: 4925
- Area code: 07754
- Vehicle registration: RI
- Website: www.gemeinde-schildorn.at

Schildorn is a municipality in the district of Ried im Innkreis in the Austrian state of Upper Austria.

== Geography ==
Schildorn lies in the Innviertel. About 18 percent of the municipality is forest, and 73 percent is farmland.
