= Mühlheim am Inn =

- Municipality
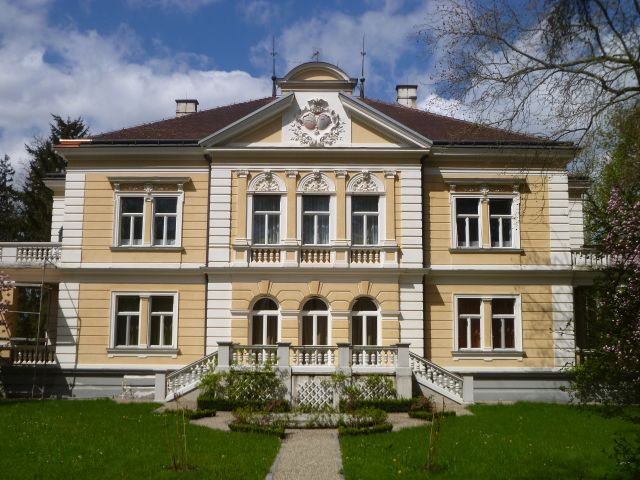

- Coat of arms

- Location within Austria
- Coordinates: 48°17′00″N 13°13′01″E
- Country: Austria
- State: Upper Austria
- District: Ried im Innkreis

Government
  - Mayor: Johann Strasser (ÖVP)

Area
  - Total: 10.91 km^{2} (4.21 sq mi)
- Elevation: 343 m (1,125 ft)

Population (2018-01-01)
  - Total: 661
  - Density: 60.6/km^{2} (157/sq mi)
- Time zone: UTC+1 (CET)
  - Summer (DST): UTC+2 (CEST)
- Postal code: 4961
- Area code: 07723
- Vehicle registration: RI
- Website: www.muehlheim.at

Mühlheim am Inn is a municipality in the district of Ried im Innkreis in the Austrian state of Upper Austria.

== Geography ==
Mühlheim lies in the Innviertel. About 16 percent of the municipality is forest, and 65 percent is farmland.
