= Kirchdorf am Inn, Austria =

Kirchdorf am Inn
- Municipality
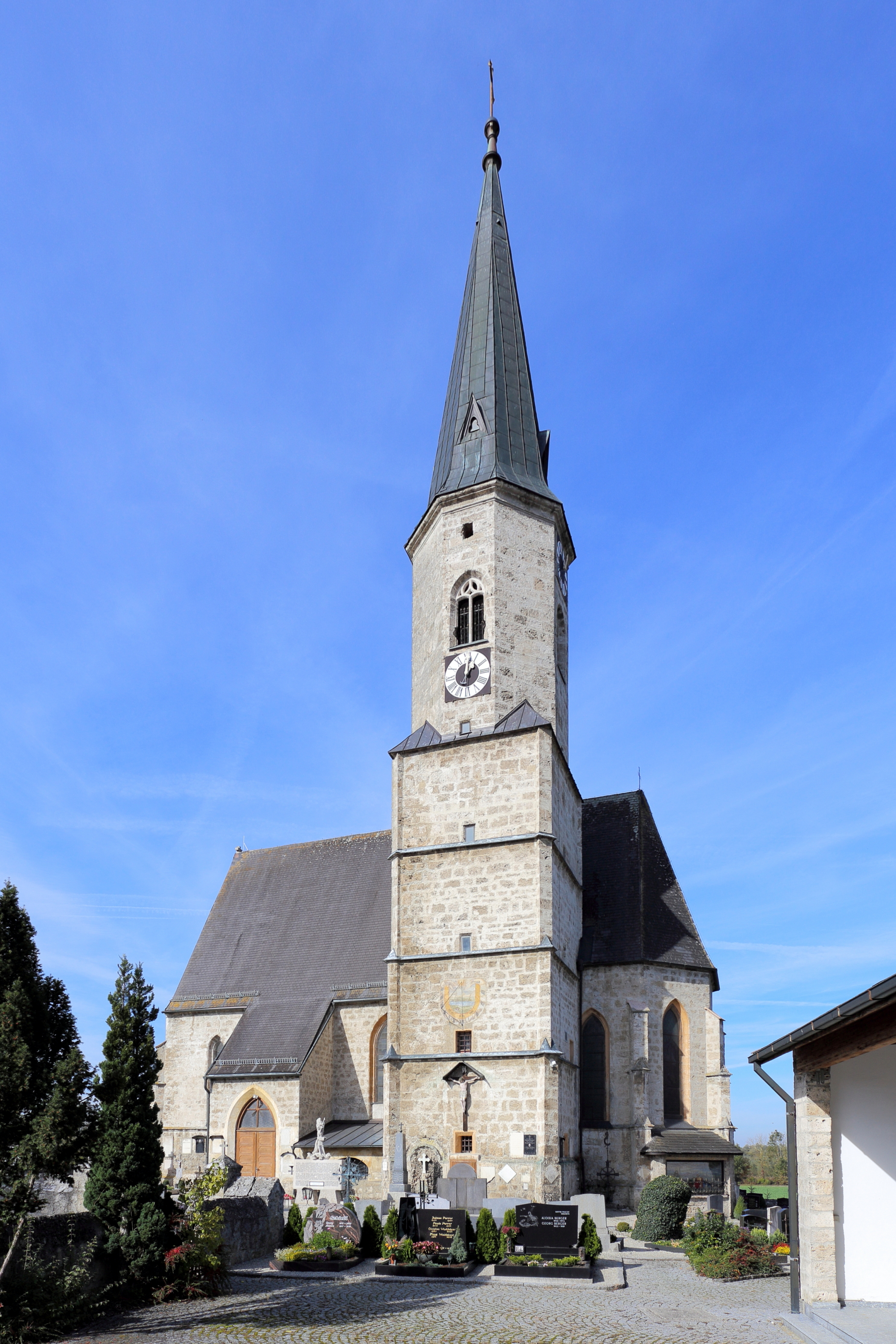
- Church of the Assumption of the Virgin Mary

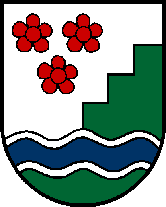
- Coat of arms

- Location within Austria
- Coordinates: 48°17′42″N 13°16′56″E
- Country: Austria
- State: Upper Austria
- District: Ried im Innkreis

Government
  - Mayor: Josef Schöppl (ÖVP)

Area
  - Total: 13.85 km^{2} (5.35 sq mi)
- Elevation: 335 m (1,099 ft)

Population (2018-01-01)
  - Total: 636
  - Density: 45.9/km^{2} (119/sq mi)
- Time zone: UTC+1 (CET)
  - Summer (DST): UTC+2 (CEST)
- Postal code: 4982
- Area code: 07758
- Vehicle registration: RI
- Website: http://www.kirchdorfaminn.at/

Kirchdorf am Inn (Austrian German pronunciation: [ˈkɪrçdɔrf am ˈɪn], lit. 'Kirchdorf on the Inn') is a municipality in the district of Ried im Innkreis in the Austrian state of Upper Austria.

== Geography ==
Kirchdorf lies in the Innviertel. About 7 percent of the municipality is forest, and 61 percent is farmland.

=== Populated places ===
The municipality of Kirchdorf consists of the following populated places (with population in brackets as of 1 January 2022).

- Graben (65)
- Katzenberg (126)
- Katzenbergleithen (32)
- Kirchdorf am Inn (254)
- Pirath (53)
- Simetsham (40)
- Ufer (71)
