= St. Georgen bei Obernberg am Inn =

- Municipality
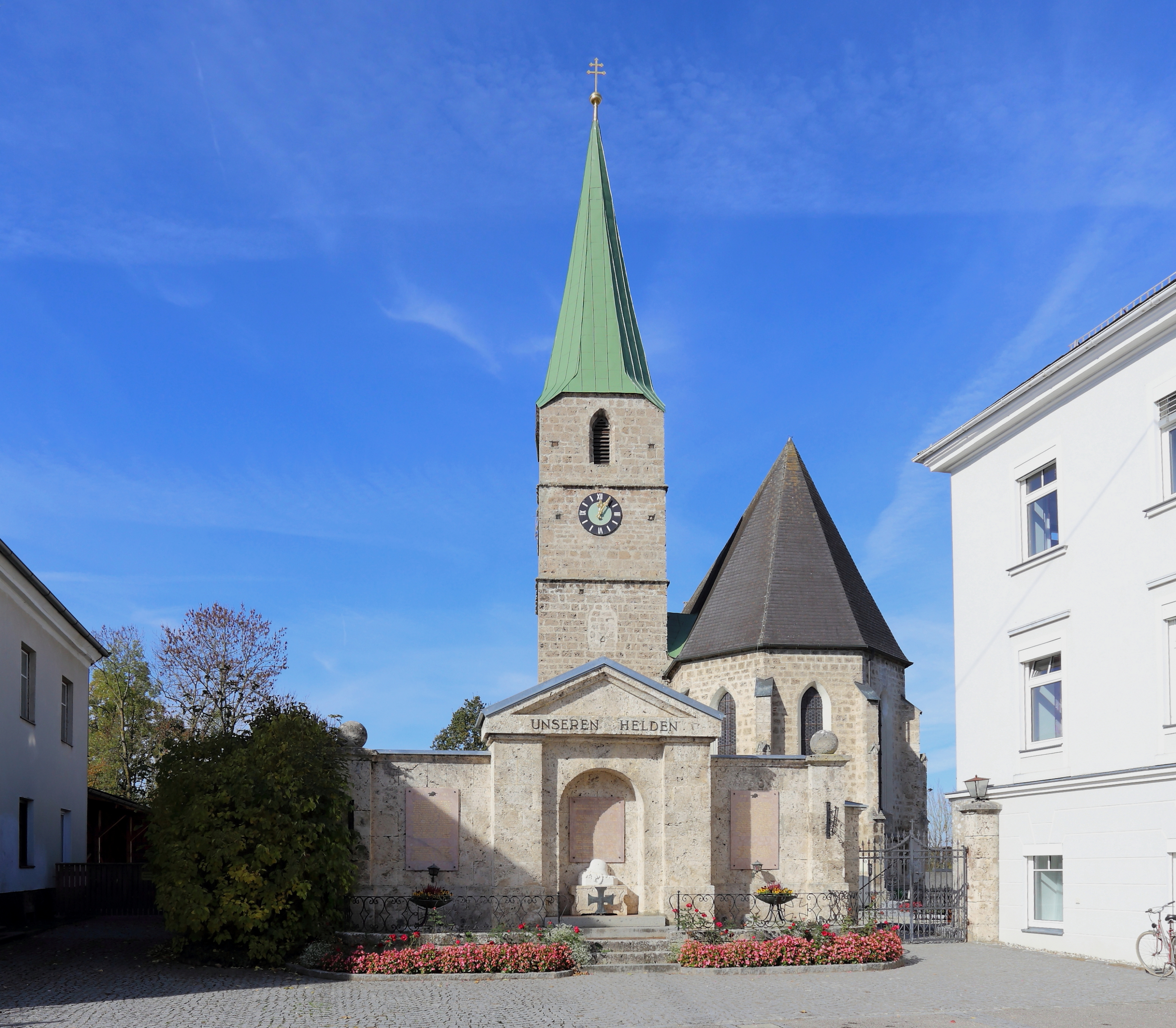

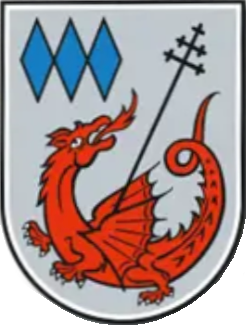
- Coat of arms

- Location within Austria
- Coordinates: 48°17′37″N 13°20′02″E
- Country: Austria
- State: Upper Austria
- District: Ried

Government
  - Mayor: Gerhard Wipplinger (ÖVP)

Area
  - Total: 18.34 km^{2} (7.08 sq mi)
- Elevation: 354 m (1,161 ft)

Population (2018-01-01)
  - Total: 569
  - Density: 31.0/km^{2} (80.4/sq mi)
- Time zone: UTC+1 (CET)
  - Summer (DST): UTC+2 (CEST)
- Postal code: 4983
- Area code: 07758
- Vehicle registration: RI

St. Georgen bei Obernberg am Inn is a municipality in the district of Ried in the Austrian state of Upper Austria.

== Geography ==
St. Georgen lies in the Innviertel. About 6 percent of the municipality is forest, and 86 percent is farmland.
