= Gurten, Upper Austria =

Gurten
- Municipality
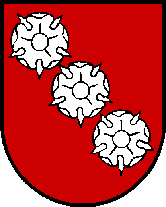
- Coat of arms

- Location within Austria
- Coordinates: 48°14′28″N 13°20′41″E
- Country: Austria
- State: Upper Austria
- District: Ried im Innkreis

Government
  - Mayor: Karl Pumberger-Kasper (ÖVP)

Area
  - Total: 16.22 km^{2} (6.26 sq mi)
- Elevation: 400 m (1,300 ft)

Population (2018-01-01)
  - Total: 1,187
  - Density: 73.18/km^{2} (189.5/sq mi)
- Time zone: UTC+1 (CET)
  - Summer (DST): UTC+2 (CEST)
- Postal code: 4942
- Area code: 07757
- Vehicle registration: RI

Gurten is a municipality in the district of Ried im Innkreis in the Austrian state of Upper Austria.

== Geography ==
Gurten lies in the Innviertel. About 28 percent of the municipality is forest, and 66 percent is farmland.
