= Pramet =

- Municipality
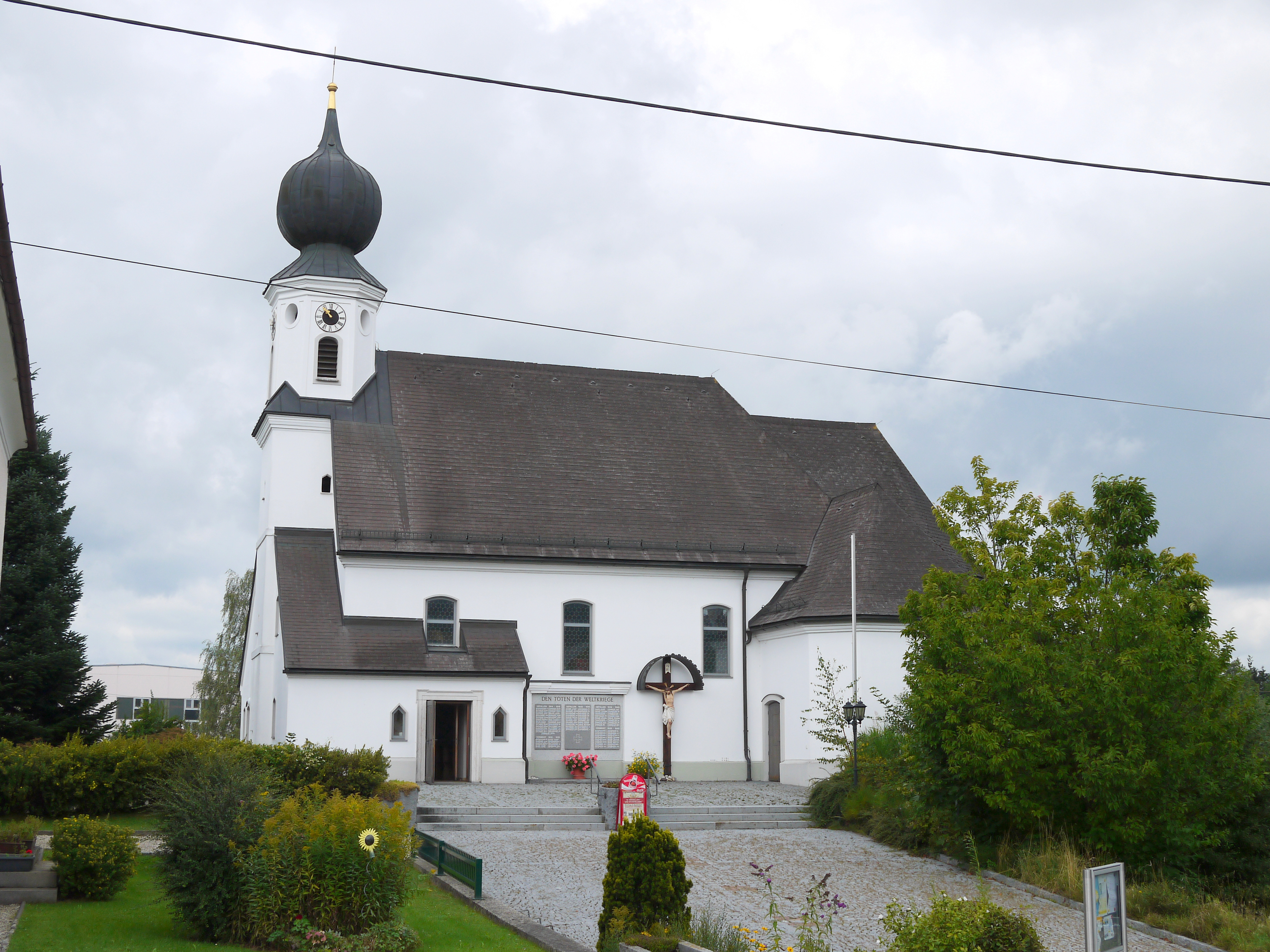

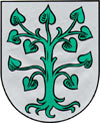
- Coat of arms

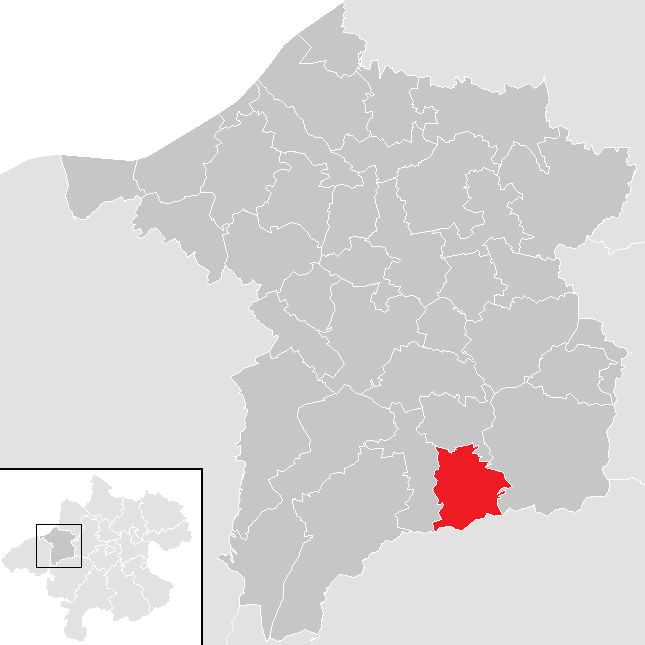
- Location in the district

- Location within Austria
- Coordinates: 48°08′32″N 13°29′12″E
- Country: Austria
- State: Upper Austria
- District: Ried im Innkreis

Government
  - Mayor: Eduard Seib (ÖVP)

Area
  - Total: 13.9 km^{2} (5.4 sq mi)
- Elevation: 512 m (1,680 ft)

Population (2018-01-01)
  - Total: 1,030
  - Density: 74.1/km^{2} (192/sq mi)
- Time zone: UTC+1 (CET)
  - Summer (DST): UTC+2 (CEST)
- Postal code: 4925
- Area code: 0 77 54
- Vehicle registration: RI
- Website: www.pramet.at

Pramet is a municipality in the district of Ried im Innkreis in the Austrian state of Upper Austria.

== Geography ==
Pramet lies in the Innviertel. About 31 percent of the municipality is forest, and 59 percent is farmland.
