= Eberschwang =

- Municipality
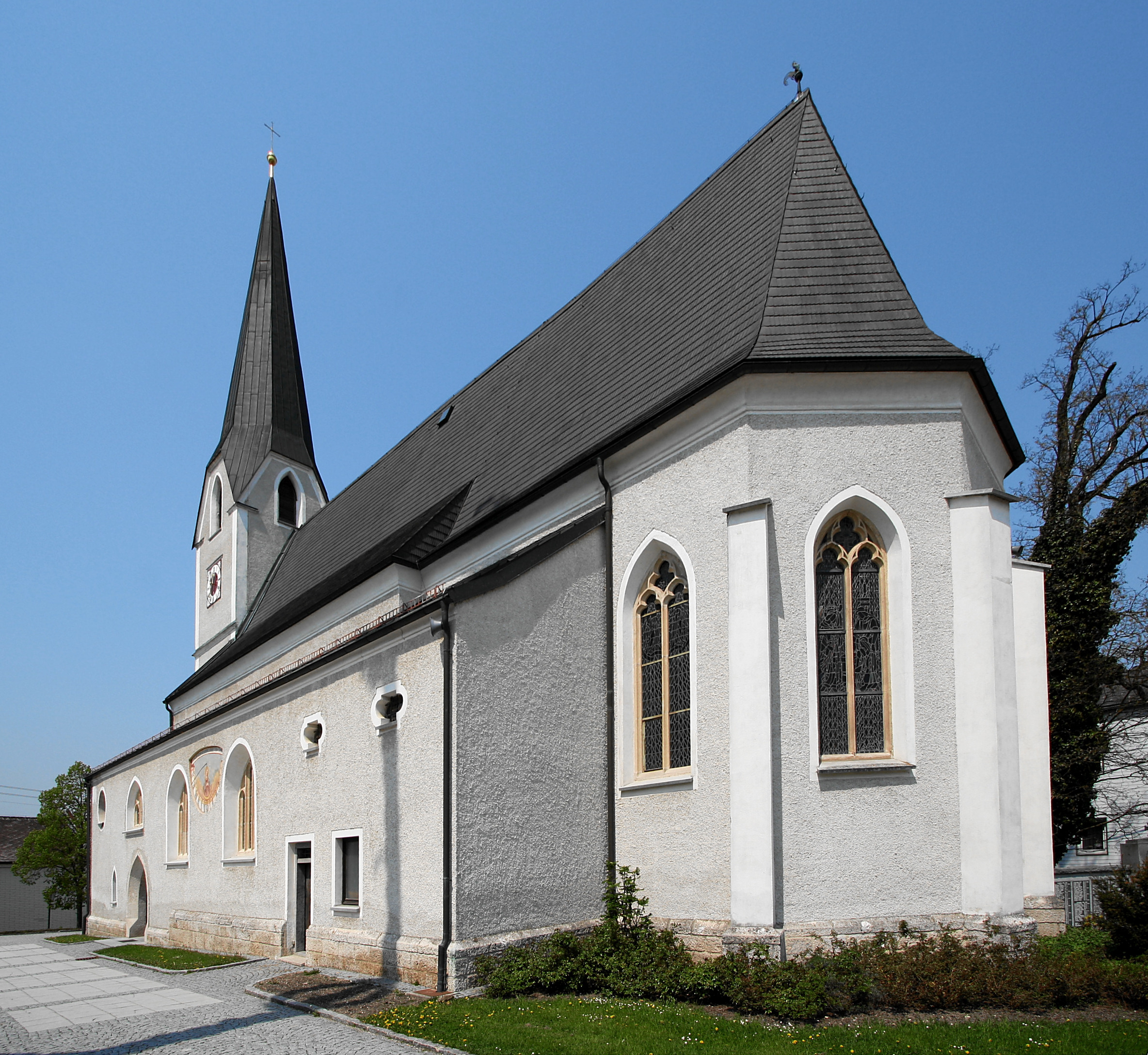
- Church of Saint Michael

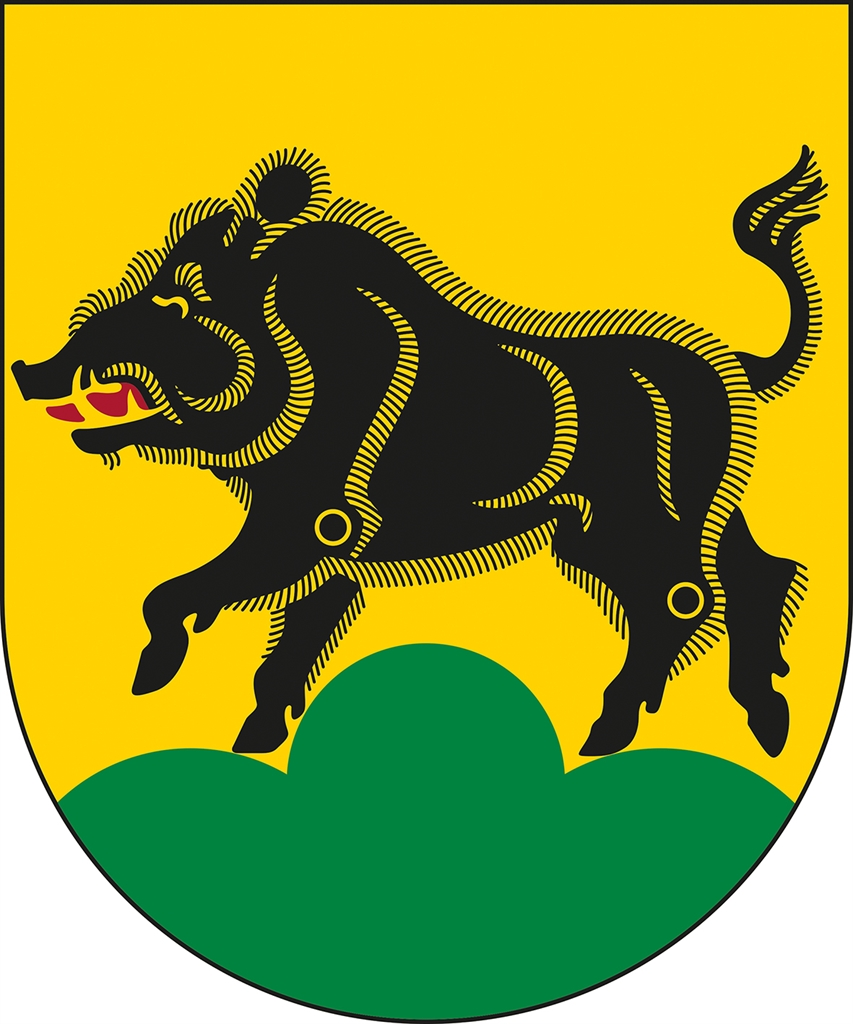
- Coat of arms

- Location within Austria
- Coordinates: 48°09′16″N 13°33′41″E
- Country: Austria
- State: Upper Austria
- District: Ried im Innkreis

Government
  - Mayor: Josef Bleckenwegner (SPÖ)

Area
  - Total: 40.43 km^{2} (15.61 sq mi)
- Elevation: 529 m (1,736 ft)

Population (2018-01-01)
  - Total: 3,351
  - Density: 82.88/km^{2} (214.7/sq mi)
- Time zone: UTC+1 (CET)
  - Summer (DST): UTC+2 (CEST)
- Postal code: 4906
- Area code: 07753
- Vehicle registration: RI
- Website: www.eberschwang.at

Eberschwang is a municipality in the district of Ried im Innkreis in the Austrian state of Upper Austria.

== Population ==
Historical population
Year	Pop.	±%
1869	2,577	—
1880	2,673	+3.7%
1890	2,725	+1.9%
1900	2,785	+2.2%
1910	3,007	+8.0%
1923	3,278	+9.0%
1934	3,106	−5.2%
1939	2,955	−4.9%
1951	3,633	+22.9%
1961	3,185	−12.3%
1971	3,239	+1.7%
1981	3,191	−1.5%
1991	3,331	+4.4%
2001	3,373	+1.3%
2013	3,381	+0.2%
