= Ried District =

Coordinates: 48.241°N 13.435°E

Ried District Bezirk Ried
- District
- Country: Austria
- State: Upper Austria
- Number of municipalities: 36
- Administrative seat: Ried im Innkreis

Government
  - District Governor: Yvonne Weidenholzer

Area
  - Total: 585.0 km^{2} (225.9 sq mi)

Population (2026)
  - Total: 63,787
  - Density: 109.0/km^{2} (282.4/sq mi)
- Time zone: UTC+01:00 (CET)
  - Summer (DST): UTC+02:00 (CEST)
- Vehicle registration: RI

Bezirk Ried is a district of the state of Upper Austria in Austria.

== Municipalities ==
Towns (Städte) are indicated in boldface; market towns (Marktgemeinden) in italics; suburbs, hamlets and other subdivisions of a municipality are indicated in small characters.

- Andrichsfurt
- Antiesenhofen
- Aurolzmünster
- Eberschwang
- Eitzing
- Geiersberg
- Geinberg
- Gurten
- Hohenzell
- Kirchdorf am Inn
- Kirchheim im Innkreis
- Lambrechten
- Lohnsburg
- Mehrnbach
- Mettmach
- Mörschwang
- Mühlheim am Inn
- Neuhofen im Innkreis
- Obernberg am Inn
- Ort im Innkreis
- Pattigham
- Peterskirchen
- Pramet
- Reichersberg
- **Ried im Innkreis**
- St. Georgen bei Obernberg am Inn
- St. Marienkirchen am Hausruck
- St. Martin im Innkreis
- Schildorn
- Senftenbach
- Taiskirchen im Innkreis
- Tumeltsham
- Utzenaich
- Waldzell
- Weilbach
- Wippenham
