= Antiesen =

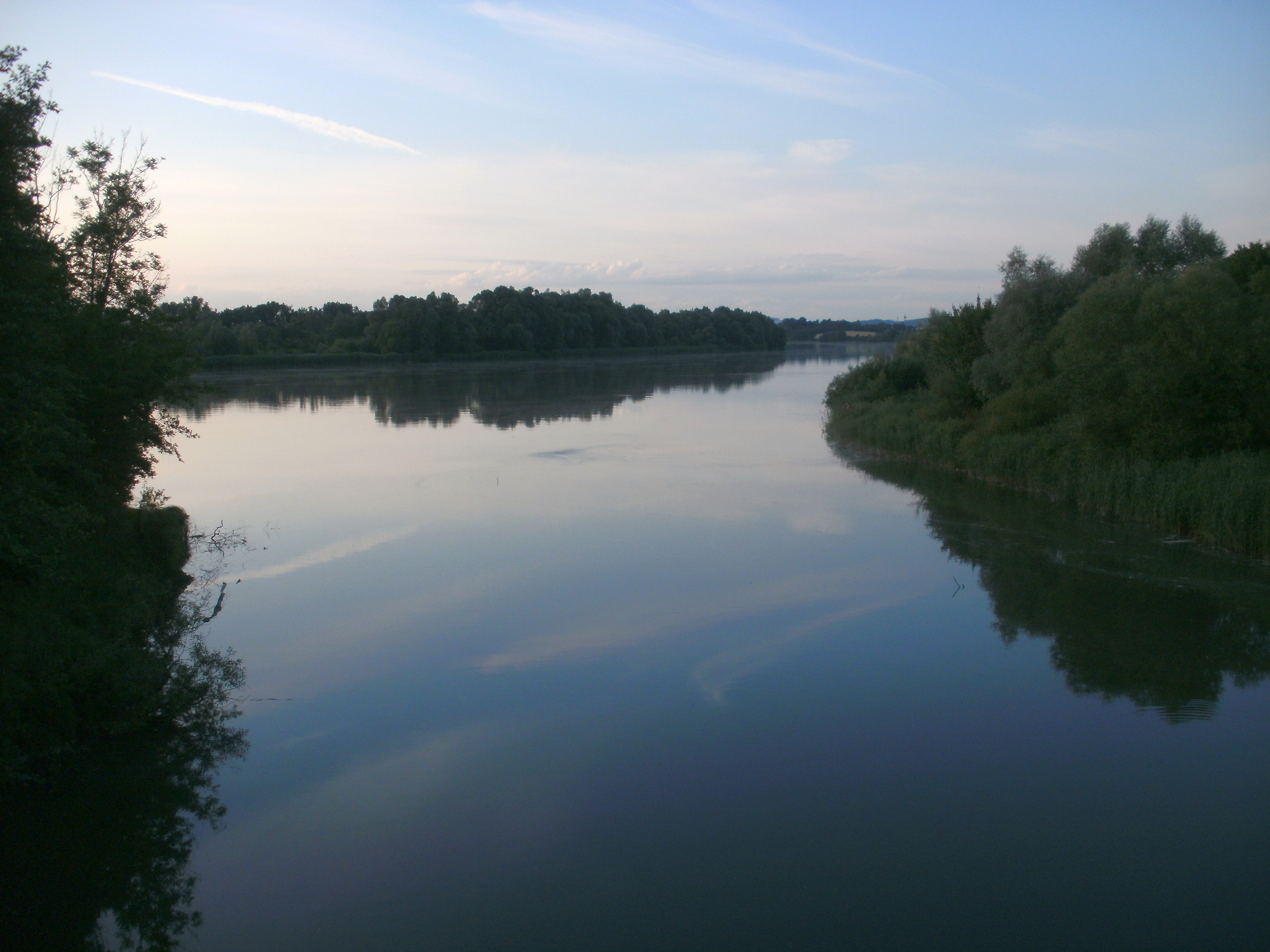
- The Antiesen discharging into the Inn

- Location of mouth in Austria

Location
- Country: Austria
- State: Upper Austria

Physical characteristics
- Mouth
  - location: Inn
  - coordinates: 48.3707°N 13.4084°E
- Length: 44.7 km (27.8 mi)

Basin features
- Progression: Inn→ Danube→ Black Sea

The Antiesen is a river of Upper Austria and a right tributary of the Inn. It is 44.7 km (27.8 mi) long. It flows into the Inn near Antiesenhofen.
