= Maxtra 125 =

Haojue 125
- Manufacturer: Haojue
- Production: 2009
- Predecessor: none
- Engine: 125 cc two-stroke engine

The Maxtra 125 is a race motorcycle manufactured by Haojue to race in the Grand Prix motorcycle World Championship. Its first season was in 2009.

The engine design is innovative for a 125cc racing bike: the cylinder points downwards, rendering several possibilities in the intake system and in weight distribution. Also, Haojue will try to improve the 125 by developing aerodynamics of the bodywork.

== 2009 specifications ==
Engine Two-stroke single-cylinder liquid cooled
Bore & Stroke: 54 X 54.5mm
Displacement: 124.8cc
Induction: Reed valve
Carburettor: 38mm
Compression Ratio: 15:1
Ignition: DCI-CDI with battery
Transmission: Six-speed cassette-type gearbox
Clutch: Dry multiplate

Chassis Wheelbase: 1,235mm
Fork angle: 23 degrees
Trail: 92mm
Front Suspension: Öhlins GP125 gas pressurised
Rear Suspension: Öhlins TTX36
Brakes: Brembo – twin 220mm floating discs front, twin-piston monobloc callipers
Wheels: PVM
Tyres: Dunlop
Chain: Regina
