= Geinberg =

- Municipality
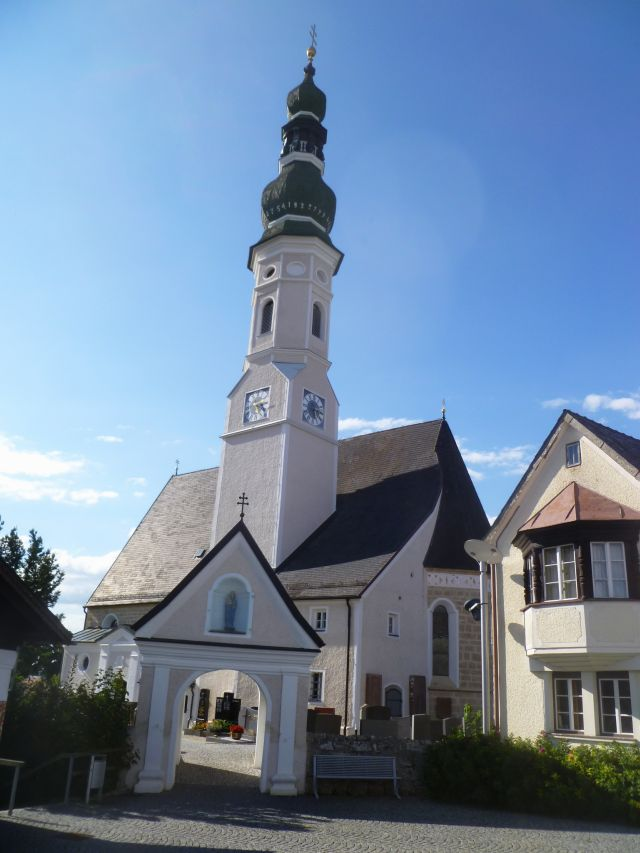

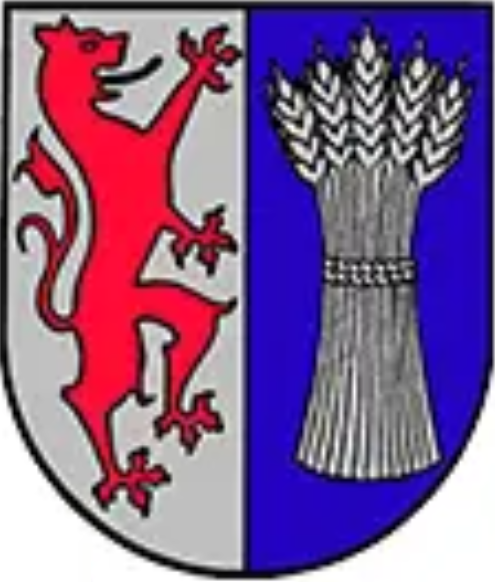
- Coat of arms

- Location within Austria
- Coordinates: 48°15′52″N 13°17′41″E
- Country: Austria
- State: Upper Austria
- District: Ried im Innkreis

Government
  - Mayor: Bernhard Schöppl (FPÖ)

Area
  - Total: 14.04 km^{2} (5.42 sq mi)
- Elevation: 403 m (1,322 ft)

Population (2018-01-01)
  - Total: 1,435
  - Density: 102.2/km^{2} (264.7/sq mi)
- Time zone: UTC+1 (CET)
  - Summer (DST): UTC+2 (CEST)
- Postal code: 4943
- Area code: 07723
- Vehicle registration: RI
- Website: www.geinberg.ooe.gv.at

Geinberg is a municipality in the district of Ried im Innkreis in the Austrian state of Upper Austria.

== Geography ==
Geinberg lies in the Innviertel. About 18 percent of the municipality is forest, and 71 percent is farmland.
