= Utzenaich =

- Municipality
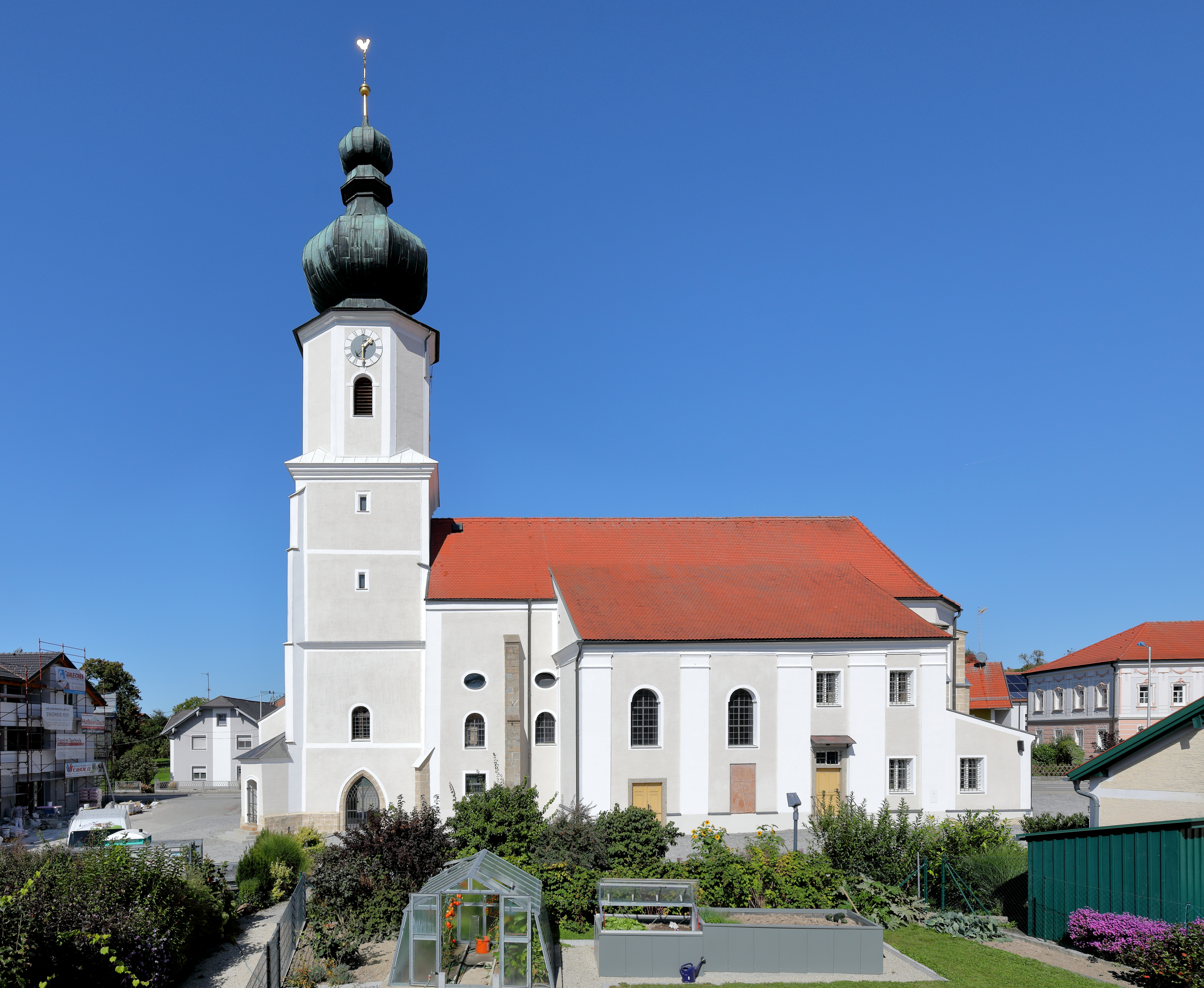

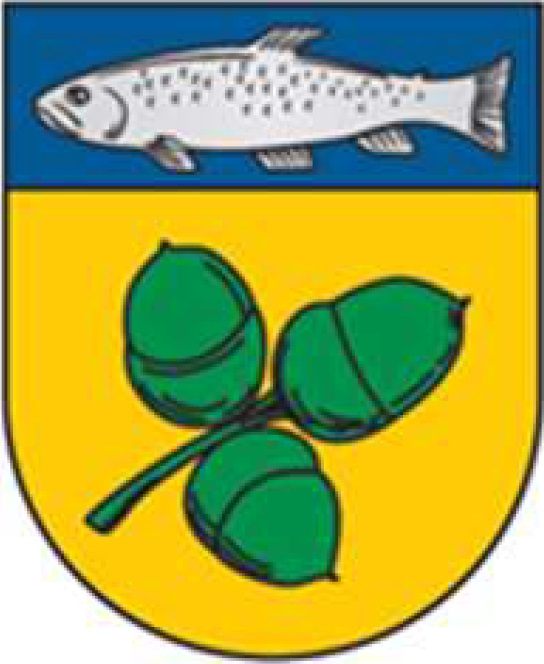
- Coat of arms

- Location within Austria
- Coordinates: 48°16′35″N 13°27′40″E
- Country: Austria
- State: Upper Austria
- District: Ried im Innkreis

Government
  - Mayor: Karl Ehwallner (ÖVP)

Area
  - Total: 20.35 km^{2} (7.86 sq mi)
- Elevation: 398 m (1,306 ft)

Population (2018-01-01)
  - Total: 1,536
  - Density: 75.48/km^{2} (195.5/sq mi)
- Time zone: UTC+1 (CET)
  - Summer (DST): UTC+2 (CEST)
- Postal code: 4972
- Area code: 07751
- Vehicle registration: RI

Utzenaich is a municipality in the district of Ried im Innkreis in the Austrian state of Upper Austria.

== Geography ==
Utzenaich lies in the Innviertel. About 9 percent of the municipality is forest, and 81 percent is farmland.
