= Aurolzmünster =

- Municipality
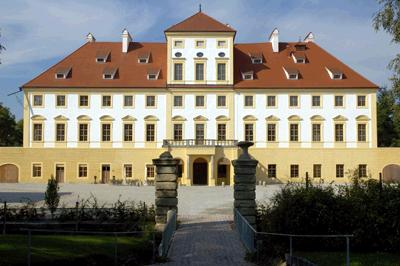

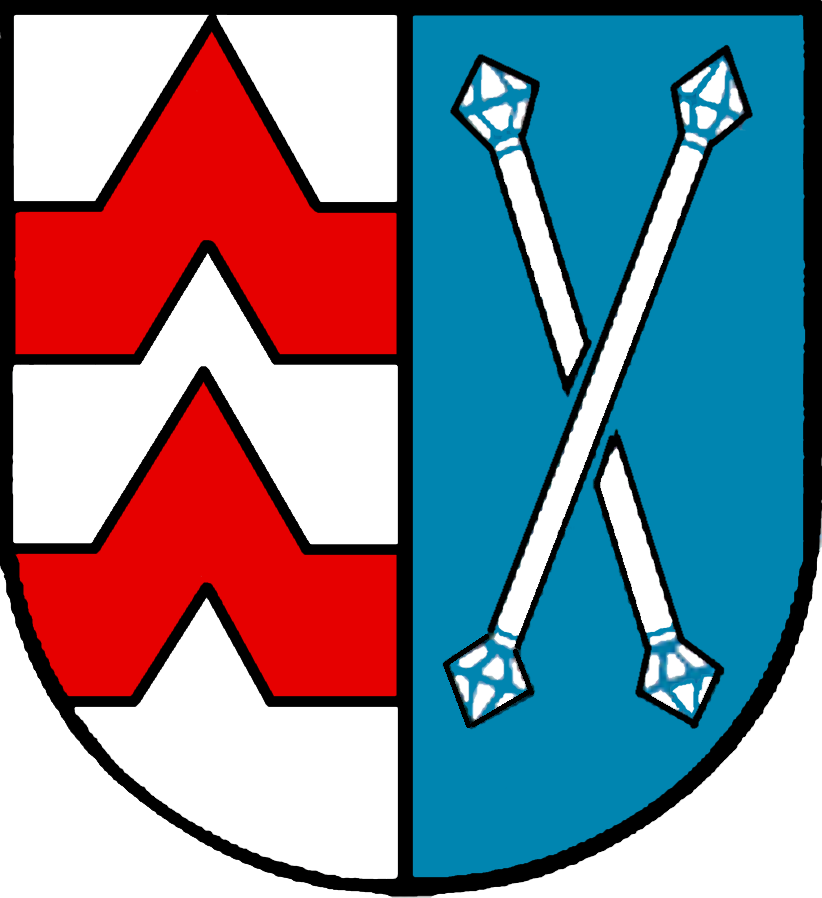
- Coat of arms

- Location within Austria
- Coordinates: 48°14′54″N 13°27′24″E
- Country: Austria
- State: Upper Austria
- District: Ried im Innkreis

Government
  - Mayor: Walter Schneiderbauer (SPÖ)

Area
  - Total: 15.96 km^{2} (6.16 sq mi)
- Elevation: 407 m (1,335 ft)

Population (2018-01-01)
  - Total: 3,000
  - Density: 190/km^{2} (490/sq mi)
- Time zone: UTC+1 (CET)
  - Summer (DST): UTC+2 (CEST)
- Postal code: 4971
- Area code: 07752
- Vehicle registration: RI
- Website: www.aurolzmuenster.at

Aurolzmünster is a municipality in the district of Ried im Innkreis in the Austrian state of Upper Austria.

== Population ==
Historical population
Year	Pop.	±%
1869	1,628	—
1880	1,694	+4.1%
1890	1,648	−2.7%
1900	1,708	+3.6%
1910	1,718	+0.6%
1923	1,690	−1.6%
1934	1,867	+10.5%
1939	1,834	−1.8%
1951	2,304	+25.6%
1961	2,184	−5.2%
1971	2,598	+19.0%
1981	2,495	−4.0%
1991	2,591	+3.8%
2001	2,851	+10.0%
