= Waldzell =

- Municipality
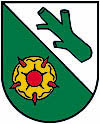
- Coat of arms

- Location within Austria
- Coordinates: 48°08′10″N 13°25′45″E
- Country: Austria
- State: Upper Austria
- District: Ried im Innkreis

Government
  - Mayor: Johann Jöchtl (SPÖ)

Area
  - Total: 40.25 km^{2} (15.54 sq mi)
- Elevation: 522 m (1,713 ft)

Population (2018-01-01)
  - Total: 2,177
  - Density: 54.09/km^{2} (140.1/sq mi)
- Time zone: UTC+1 (CET)
  - Summer (DST): UTC+2 (CEST)
- Postal code: 4924
- Area code: 07754
- Vehicle registration: RI
- Website: www.waldzell.ooe.gv.at

Waldzell is a municipality in the district of Ried im Innkreis in the Austrian state of Upper Austria.

== Geography ==
Waldzell lies in the Innviertel. About 49 percent of the municipality is forest, and 46 percent is farmland.
