= Antiesenhofen =

- Municipality
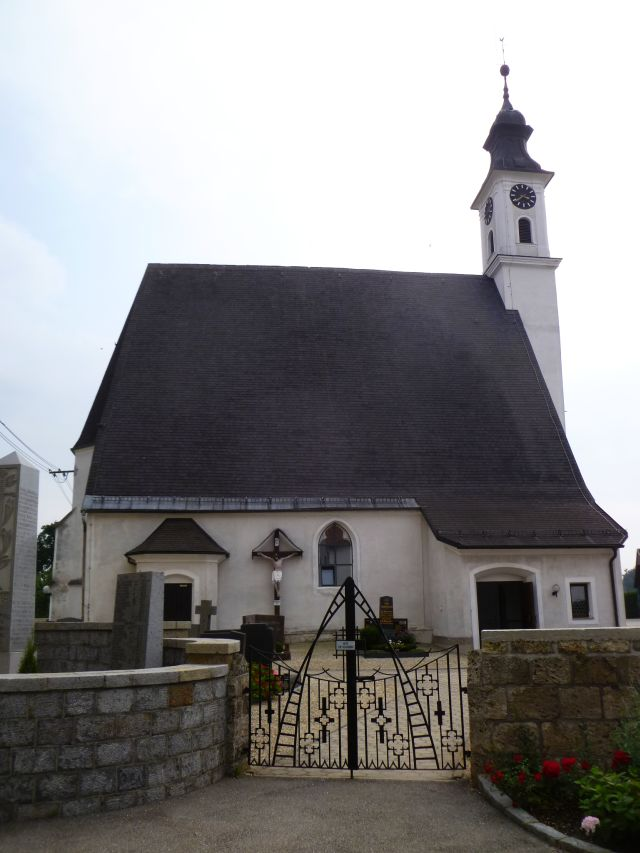

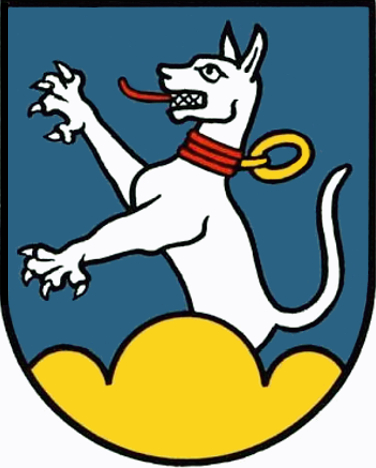
- Coat of arms

- Location within Austria
- Coordinates: 48°20′33″N 13°23′52″E
- Country: Austria
- State: Upper Austria
- District: Ried im Innkreis

Government
  - Mayor: Friedrich Stockmayr (ÖVP)

Area
  - Total: 8.58 km^{2} (3.31 sq mi)
- Elevation: 346 m (1,135 ft)

Population (2018-01-01)
  - Total: 1,091
  - Density: 127/km^{2} (329/sq mi)
- Time zone: UTC+1 (CET)
  - Summer (DST): UTC+2 (CEST)
- Postal code: 4980
- Area code: 07759
- Vehicle registration: RI
- Website: www.antiesenhofen.at

Antiesenhofen is a municipality in the district of Ried im Innkreis in the Austrian state of Upper Austria.

== Population ==
Historical population
Year	Pop.	±%
1869	501	—
1880	540	+7.8%
1890	587	+8.7%
1900	619	+5.5%
1910	771	+24.6%
1923	806	+4.5%
1934	832	+3.2%
1939	798	−4.1%
1951	857	+7.4%
1961	842	−1.8%
1971	908	+7.8%
1981	957	+5.4%
1991	990	+3.4%
2001	1,005	+1.5%
2013	1,093	+8.8%
