= Mühlviertel (National Council electoral district) =

Parliamentary electoral district in Austria

- Electoral District for the National Council
- Location of Mühlviertel within Austria
- District: List: Freistadt; Greater Urfahr; Perg; Rohrbach
- State: Upper Austria
- Population: 284,464 (2024)
- Electorate: 221,009 (2019)
- Area: 3,085 km^{2} (2023)

Current Electoral District
- Created: 1994
- Seats: 6 (1994–present)
- Members: List: Rosa Ecker (FPÖ); Michael Hammer (ÖVP); Johanna Jachs (ÖVP); Sabine Schatz (SPÖ)

Mühlviertel, also known as Electoral District 4E (German: Wahlkreis 4E), is one of the 39 multi-member regional electoral districts of the National Council, the lower house of the Austrian Parliament, the national legislature of Austria. The electoral district was created in 1992 when electoral regulations were amended to add regional electoral districts to the existing state-wide electoral districts and came into being at the following legislative election in 1994. It consists of the districts of Freistadt, Greater Urfahr, Perg and Rohrbach in the state of Upper Austria. The electoral district currently elects six of the 183 members of the National Council using the open party-list proportional representation electoral system. At the 2019 legislative election the constituency had 221,009 registered electors.

== History ==
Mühlviertel was one 43 regional electoral districts (regionalwahlkreise) established by the "National Council Electoral Regulations 1992" (Nationalrats-Wahlordnung 1992) passed by the National Council in 1992. It consisted of the districts of Freistadt, Greater Urfahr, Perg and Rohrbach in the state of Upper Austria. The district was initially allocated six seats in May 1993.

== Electoral system ==
Mühlviertel currently elects six of the 183 members of the National Council using the open party-list proportional representation electoral system. The allocation of seats is carried out in three stages. In the first stage, seats are allocated to parties (lists) at the regional level using a state-wide Hare quota (wahlzahl) (valid votes in the state divided by the number of seats in the state). In the second stage, seats are allocated to parties at the state/provincial level using the state-wide Hare quota (any seats won by the party at the regional stage are subtracted from the party's state seats). In the third and final stage, seats are allocated to parties at the federal/national level using the D'Hondt method (any seats won by the party at the regional and state stages are subtracted from the party's federal seats). Only parties that reach the 4% national threshold, or have won a seat at the regional stage, compete for seats at the state and federal stages.

Electors may cast one preferential vote for individual candidates at the regional, state and federal levels. Split-ticket voting (panachage), or voting for more than one candidate at each level, is not permitted and will result in the ballot paper being invalidated. At the regional level, candidates must receive preferential votes amounting to at least 14% of the valid votes cast for their party to over-ride the order of the party list (10% and 7% respectively for the state and federal levels). Prior to April 2013 electors could not cast preferential votes at the federal level and the thresholds candidates needed to over-ride the party list order were higher at the regional level (half the Hare quota or 1/6 of the party votes) and state level (Hare quota).

== Election results ==
=== Summary ===
Election	Communists KPÖ+ / KPÖ			Social Democrats SPÖ			Greens GRÜNE			NEOS NEOS / LiF			People's ÖVP			Freedom FPÖ		
Election	Votes	%	Seats	Votes	%	Seats	Votes	%	Seats	Votes	%	Seats	Votes	%	Seats	Votes	%	Seats
2019	891	0.50%	0	35,703	19.91%	1	24,627	13.73%	0	12,693	7.08%	0	75,139	41.90%	2	27,201	15.17%	1
2017	1,002	0.54%	0	47,176	25.34%	1	7,065	3.80%	0	8,664	4.65%	0	69,413	37.29%	2	44,188	23.74%	1
2013	1,167	0.67%	0	43,609	24.86%	1	21,151	12.06%	0	5,263	3.00%	0	57,854	32.98%	2	30,597	17.44%	1
2008	990	0.55%	0	49,167	27.54%	1	17,560	9.84%	0	2,065	1.16%	0	59,830	33.51%	2	28,843	16.16%	1
2006	1,256	0.73%	0	55,852	32.64%	2	17,131	10.01%	0				73,463	42.93%	2	15,592	9.11%	0
2002	663	0.39%	0	55,749	32.50%	2	14,098	8.22%	0	1,150	0.67%	0	87,131	50.80%	3	12,721	7.42%	0
1999	441	0.27%	0	48,861	30.26%	1	11,340	7.02%	0	3,509	2.17%	0	62,813	38.90%	2	32,886	20.37%	1
1995	275	0.17%	0	54,623	33.70%	2	8,233	5.08%	0	5,928	3.66%	0	65,199	40.22%	2	25,962	16.02%	0
1994	243	0.16%	0	46,712	30.17%	1	10,927	7.06%	0	5,986	3.87%	0	62,891	40.62%	2	25,555	16.51%	1

=== Detailed ===
==== 2010s ====
===== 2019 =====
Results of the 2019 legislative election held on 29 September 2019:

Party		Votes per district					Total votes	%	Seats
Party		Freis- tadt	Greater Urfahr	Perg	Rohr- bach	Voting card	Total votes	%	Seats
Austrian People's Party	ÖVP	18,623	22,082	16,669	17,629	136	75,139	41.90%	2
Social Democratic Party of Austria	SPÖ	9,230	10,531	10,586	5,285	71	35,703	19.91%	1
Freedom Party of Austria	FPÖ	6,770	7,596	6,831	5,947	57	27,201	15.17%	1
The Greens	GRÜNE	5,525	10,047	4,770	4,058	227	24,627	13.73%	0
NEOS – The New Austria and Liberal Forum	NEOS	2,646	4,967	2,540	2,462	78	12,693	7.08%	0
JETZT	JETZT	532	784	505	389	24	2,234	1.25%	0
KPÖ Plus	KPÖ+	245	273	199	170	4	891	0.50%	0
Der Wandel	WANDL	184	285	183	132	1	785	0.44%	0
Socialist Left Party	SLP	22	19	19	6	2	68	0.04%	0
Valid Votes		43,777	56,584	42,302	36,078	600	179,341	100.00%	4
Rejected Votes		851	873	793	613	9	3,139	1.72%	
Total Polled		44,628	57,457	43,095	36,691	609	182,480	82.57%	
Registered Electors		53,816	68,781	52,899	45,513		221,009		
Turnout		82.93%	83.54%	81.47%	80.62%		82.57%		

The following candidates were elected:

- Party mandates - Rosa Ecker (FPÖ), 920 votes; Michael Hammer (ÖVP), 3,789 votes; Johanna Jachs (ÖVP), 7,382 votes; and Sabine Schatz (SPÖ), 3,616 votes.

===== 2017 =====
Results of the 2017 legislative election held on 15 October 2017:

Party		Votes per district					Total votes	%	Seats
Party		Freis- tadt	Greater Urfahr	Perg	Rohr- bach	Voting card	Total votes	%	Seats
Austrian People's Party	ÖVP	16,691	20,848	15,123	16,575	176	69,413	37.29%	2
Social Democratic Party of Austria	SPÖ	11,915	15,022	12,722	7,326	191	47,176	25.34%	1
Freedom Party of Austria	FPÖ	11,025	12,146	11,222	9,695	100	44,188	23.74%	1
NEOS – The New Austria and Liberal Forum	NEOS	1,697	3,459	1,744	1,689	75	8,664	4.65%	0
The Greens	GRÜNE	1,620	2,834	1,285	1,251	75	7,065	3.80%	0
Peter Pilz List	PILZ	1,336	2,450	1,314	981	96	6,177	3.32%	0
My Vote Counts!	GILT	473	651	422	403	16	1,965	1.06%	0
Communist Party of Austria	KPÖ	254	374	187	176	11	1,002	0.54%	0
The Whites	WEIßE	69	94	73	61	1	298	0.16%	0
Free List Austria	FLÖ	69	41	33	27	1	171	0.09%	0
Socialist Left Party	SLP	8	9	8	5	1	31	0.02%	0
Valid Votes		45,157	57,928	44,133	38,189	743	186,150	100.00%	4
Rejected Votes		720	738	607	555	7	2,627	1.39%	
Total Polled		45,877	58,666	44,740	38,744	750	188,777	85.89%	
Registered Electors		53,370	67,796	52,523	46,100		219,789		
Turnout		85.96%	86.53%	85.18%	84.04%		85.89%		

The following candidates were elected:

- Party mandates - Michael Hammer (ÖVP), 5,952 votes; Johanna Jachs (ÖVP), 5,363 votes; Anneliese Kitzmüller (FPÖ), 1,453 votes; and Sabine Schatz (SPÖ), 2,686 votes. (Note: ÖVP: 3rd placed candidate Nikolaus Prinz was elected in Upper Austria.)

===== 2013 =====
Results of the 2013 legislative election held on 29 September 2013:

Party		Votes per district					Total votes	%	Seats
Party		Freis- tadt	Greater Urfahr	Perg	Rohr- bach	Voting card	Total votes	%	Seats
Austrian People's Party	ÖVP	14,047	16,425	12,380	14,863	139	57,854	32.98%	2
Social Democratic Party of Austria	SPÖ	11,231	12,331	12,862	7,089	96	43,609	24.86%	1
Freedom Party of Austria	FPÖ	7,656	8,756	7,775	6,322	88	30,597	17.44%	1
The Greens	GRÜNE	4,668	8,660	4,137	3,481	205	21,151	12.06%	0
Team Stronach	FRANK	1,672	2,630	1,879	1,627	29	7,837	4.47%	0
Alliance for the Future of Austria	BZÖ	1,553	1,831	1,167	992	12	5,555	3.17%	0
NEOS – The New Austria	NEOS	984	2,324	1,068	836	51	5,263	3.00%	0
Pirate Party of Austria	PIRAT	378	412	272	296	15	1,373	0.78%	0
Communist Party of Austria	KPÖ	322	407	228	197	13	1,167	0.67%	0
Christian Party of Austria	CPÖ	141	172	201	194	0	708	0.40%	0
Der Wandel	WANDL	77	102	65	61	2	307	0.18%	0
Valid Votes		42,729	54,050	42,034	35,958	650	175,421	100.00%	4
Rejected Votes		1,356	1,589	1,161	1,259	9	5,374	2.97%	
Total Polled		44,085	55,639	43,195	37,217	659	180,795	82.98%	
Registered Electors		52,884	66,789	51,994	46,198		217,865		
Turnout		83.36%	83.31%	83.08%	80.56%		82.98%		

The following candidates were elected:

- Personal mandates - Reinhold Mitterlehner (ÖVP), 10,709 votes.
- Party mandates - Marianne Gusenbauer-Jäger (SPÖ), 1,877 votes; Anneliese Kitzmüller (FPÖ), 1,213 votes; and Nikolaus Prinz (ÖVP), 2,922 votes.

Substitutions:

- Reinhold Mitterlehner (ÖVP) resigned on 16 December 2013 and was replaced by Michael Hammer (ÖVP) on 17 December 2013.

==== 2000s ====
===== 2008 =====
Results of the 2008 legislative election held on 28 September 2008:

Party		Votes per district					Total votes	%	Seats
Party		Freis- tadt	Greater Urfahr	Perg	Rohr- bach	Voting card	Total votes	%	Seats
Austrian People's Party	ÖVP	14,641	16,800	12,627	15,258	504	59,830	33.51%	2
Social Democratic Party of Austria	SPÖ	12,147	13,917	14,779	7,852	472	49,167	27.54%	1
Freedom Party of Austria	FPÖ	7,230	8,209	7,291	5,884	229	28,843	16.16%	1
The Greens	GRÜNE	3,901	6,989	3,200	3,003	467	17,560	9.84%	0
Alliance for the Future of Austria	BZÖ	3,630	4,716	3,271	3,322	131	15,070	8.44%	0
Liberal Forum	LiF	424	899	359	314	69	2,065	1.16%	0
The Christians	DC	376	545	367	438	19	1,745	0.98%	0
Fritz Dinkhauser List – Citizens' Forum Tyrol	FRITZ	349	597	360	356	26	1,688	0.95%	0
Independent Citizens' Initiative Save Austria	RETTÖ	315	513	340	303	19	1,490	0.83%	0
Communist Party of Austria	KPÖ	227	339	196	202	26	990	0.55%	0
Left	LINKE	18	21	19	14	2	74	0.04%	0
Valid Votes		43,258	53,545	42,809	36,946	1,964	178,522	100.00%	4
Rejected Votes		1,497	1,758	1,341	1,447	56	6,099	3.30%	
Total Polled		44,755	55,303	44,150	38,393	2,020	184,621	86.38%	
Registered Electors		51,822	64,770	51,216	45,922		213,730		
Turnout		86.36%	85.38%	86.20%	83.60%		86.38%		

The following candidates were elected:

- Party mandates - Kurt Gaßner (SPÖ), 3,616 votes; Anneliese Kitzmüller (FPÖ), 1,068 votes; Reinhold Mitterlehner (ÖVP), 4,838 votes; and Nikolaus Prinz (ÖVP), 2,761 votes.

Substitutions:

- Reinhold Mitterlehner (ÖVP) resigned on 2 December 2008 and was replaced by Norbert Kapeller (ÖVP) on 3 December 2008.
- Norbert Kapeller (ÖVP) resigned on 18 March 2011 and was replaced by Michael Hammer (ÖVP) on 22 March 2011.

===== 2006 =====
Results of the 2006 legislative election held on 1 October 2006:

Party		Votes per district					Total votes	%	Seats
Party		Freis- tadt	Greater Urfahr	Perg	Rohr- bach	Voting card	Total votes	%	Seats
Austrian People's Party	ÖVP	17,264	20,086	15,221	18,003	2,889	73,463	42.93%	2
Social Democratic Party of Austria	SPÖ	13,789	14,965	16,337	8,714	2,047	55,852	32.64%	2
The Greens	GRÜNE	3,566	6,309	2,901	2,652	1,703	17,131	10.01%	0
Freedom Party of Austria	FPÖ	3,708	4,658	3,765	3,006	455	15,592	9.11%	0
Hans-Peter Martin's List	MATIN	938	1,336	852	887	175	4,188	2.45%	0
Alliance for the Future of Austria	BZÖ	822	1,157	701	822	145	3,647	2.13%	0
Communist Party of Austria	KPÖ	314	393	223	271	55	1,256	0.73%	0
Valid Votes		40,401	48,904	40,000	34,355	7,469	171,129	100.00%	4
Rejected Votes		1,036	1,307	862	975	83	4,263	2.43%	
Total Polled		41,437	50,211	40,862	35,330	7,552	175,392	86.28%	
Registered Electors		49,191	61,583	48,784	43,732		203,290		
Turnout		84.24%	81.53%	83.76%	80.79%		86.28%		

The following candidates were elected:

- Party mandates - Kurt Gaßner (SPÖ), 4,411 votes; Reinhold Mitterlehner (ÖVP), 6,538 votes; Nikolaus Prinz (ÖVP), 3,688 votes; and Walter Schopf (SPÖ), 3,616 votes.

Substitutions:

- Reinhold Mitterlehner (ÖVP) was reassigned to the Upper Austria seat vacated by Wilhelm Molterer and was replaced by Norbert Kapeller (ÖVP) in Mühlviertel on 15 January 2007.

===== 2002 =====
Results of the 2002 legislative election held on 24 November 2002:

Party		Votes per district					Total votes	%	Seats
Party		Freis- tadt	Greater Urfahr	Perg	Rohr- bach	Voting card	Total votes	%	Seats
Austrian People's Party	ÖVP	20,780	24,397	18,052	21,338	2,564	87,131	50.80%	3
Social Democratic Party of Austria	SPÖ	13,766	15,268	16,365	8,799	1,551	55,749	32.50%	2
The Greens	GRÜNE	2,856	5,225	2,484	2,109	1,424	14,098	8.22%	0
Freedom Party of Austria	FPÖ	2,851	3,828	2,944	2,785	313	12,721	7.42%	0
Liberal Forum	LiF	253	424	230	174	69	1,150	0.67%	0
Communist Party of Austria	KPÖ	163	211	121	152	16	663	0.39%	0
Valid Votes		40,669	49,353	40,196	35,357	5,937	171,512	100.00%	5
Rejected Votes		766	906	729	776	69	3,246	1.86%	
Total Polled		41,435	50,259	40,925	36,133	6,006	174,758	89.99%	
Registered Electors		47,050	58,446	46,554	42,153		194,203		
Turnout		88.07%	85.99%	87.91%	85.72%		89.99%		

The following candidates were elected:

- Party mandates - Kurt Gaßner (SPÖ), 4,442 votes; Norbert Kapeller (ÖVP), 4,218 votes; Reinhold Mitterlehner (ÖVP), 7,102 votes; Nikolaus Prinz (ÖVP), 4,750 votes; and Walter Schopf (SPÖ), 1,943 votes.

==== 1990s ====
===== 1999 =====
Results of the 1999 legislative election held on 3 October 1999:

Party		Votes per district					Total votes	%	Seats
Party		Freis- tadt	Greater Urfahr	Perg	Rohr- bach	Voting card	Total votes	%	Seats
Austrian People's Party	ÖVP	15,403	16,554	12,564	16,257	2,035	62,813	38.90%	2
Social Democratic Party of Austria	SPÖ	11,768	13,075	14,182	8,132	1,704	48,861	30.26%	1
Freedom Party of Austria	FPÖ	7,405	9,747	7,671	7,122	941	32,886	20.37%	1
The Greens	GRÜNE	2,379	4,174	2,046	1,787	954	11,340	7.02%	0
Liberal Forum	LiF	582	1,348	616	507	456	3,509	2.17%	0
The Independents	DU	169	307	192	129	34	831	0.51%	0
No to NATO and EU – Neutral Austria Citizens' Initiative	NEIN	174	213	175	188	22	772	0.48%	0
Communist Party of Austria	KPÖ	104	124	94	108	11	441	0.27%	0
Valid Votes		37,984	45,542	37,540	34,230	6,157	161,453	100.00%	4
Rejected Votes		725	823	667	662	62	2,939	1.79%	
Total Polled		38,709	46,365	38,207	34,892	6,219	164,392	87.33%	
Registered Electors		45,802	55,798	45,169	41,469		188,238		
Turnout		84.51%	83.09%	84.59%	84.14%		87.33%		

The following candidates were elected:

- Party mandates - Kurt Gaßner (SPÖ), 3,510 votes; Josef Mühlbachler (ÖVP), 3,283 votes; Nikolaus Prinz (ÖVP), 3,852 votes; and Rüdiger Schender (FPÖ), 1,729 votes.

===== 1995 =====
Results of the 1995 legislative election held on 17 December 1995:

Party		Votes per district					Total votes	%	Seats
Party		Freis- tadt	Greater Urfahr	Perg	Rohr- bach	Voting card	Total votes	%	Seats
Austrian People's Party	ÖVP	15,833	17,477	13,246	17,082	1,561	65,199	40.22%	2
Social Democratic Party of Austria	SPÖ	13,482	14,999	15,837	8,934	1,371	54,623	33.70%	2
Freedom Party of Austria	FPÖ	5,792	7,798	6,086	5,730	556	25,962	16.02%	0
The Greens	GRÜNE	1,740	2,762	1,483	1,423	825	8,233	5.08%	0
Liberal Forum	LiF	1,133	2,219	1,099	884	593	5,928	3.66%	0
No – Civic Action Group; Against the Sale of Austria	NEIN	473	573	337	454	36	1,873	1.16%	0
Communist Party of Austria	KPÖ	65	79	64	54	13	275	0.17%	0
Valid Votes		38,518	45,907	38,152	34,561	4,955	162,093	100.00%	4
Rejected Votes		929	980	774	847	89	3,619	2.18%	
Total Polled		39,447	46,887	38,926	35,408	5,044	165,712	91.14%	
Registered Electors		44,513	53,295	43,371	40,652		181,831		
Turnout		88.62%	87.98%	89.75%	87.10%		91.14%		

The following candidates were elected:

- Party mandates - Robert Elmecker (SPÖ), 2,128 votes; Josef Mühlbachler (ÖVP), 2,080 votes; Johann Schuster (ÖVP), 2,785 votes; and Fritz Verzetnitsch (SPÖ), 1,777 votes.

Substitutions:

- Robert Elmecker (SPÖ) resigned on 30 April 1997 and was replaced by Kurt Gaßner (SPÖ) on 2 May 1997.

===== 1994 =====
Results of the 1994 legislative election held on 9 October 1994:

Party		Votes per district					Total votes	%	Seats
Party		Freis- tadt	Greater Urfahr	Perg	Rohr- bach	Voting card	Total votes	%	Seats
Austrian People's Party	ÖVP	15,655	16,149	12,565	16,873	1,649	62,891	40.62%	2
Social Democratic Party of Austria	SPÖ	11,644	12,346	13,684	7,877	1,161	46,712	30.17%	1
Freedom Party of Austria	FPÖ	5,437	7,819	6,250	5,339	710	25,555	16.51%	1
The Greens	GRÜNE	2,428	3,766	2,049	1,838	846	10,927	7.06%	0
Liberal Forum	LiF	1,106	2,325	1,199	875	481	5,986	3.87%	0
No – Civic Action Group; Against the Sale of Austria	NEIN	291	382	280	184	32	1,169	0.76%	0
Christian Voters Community	CWG	165	207	110	288	34	804	0.52%	0
United Greens Austria – List Adi Pinter	VGÖ	64	152	60	51	16	343	0.22%	0
Communist Party of Austria	KPÖ	48	82	58	41	14	243	0.16%	0
Natural Law Party	ÖNP	45	82	23	26	9	185	0.12%	0
Valid Votes		36,883	43,310	36,278	33,392	4,952	154,815	100.00%	4
Rejected Votes		875	928	769	735	94	3,401	2.15%	
Total Polled		37,758	44,238	37,047	34,127	5,046	158,216	87.44%	
Registered Electors		44,336	52,761	43,155	40,683		180,935		
Turnout		85.16%	83.85%	85.85%	83.89%		87.44%		

The following candidates were elected:

- Party mandates - Robert Elmecker (SPÖ), 2,956 votes; Josef Meisinger (FPÖ), 1,442 votes; Josef Mühlbachler (ÖVP), 3,322 votes; and Johann Schuster (ÖVP), 3,496 votes.
