= Manfred Hofinger =

Austrian politician (born 1970)

Member of the National Council
- Incumbent
- Assumed office 17 December 2013
- Preceded by: Michael Hammer
- Constituency: Upper Austria (2013–2019, 2021–present); Innviertel (2019–2021)

Personal details
- Born: 27 February 1970 (age 56)
- Party: People's Party

Manfred Hofinger (born 27 February 1970) is an Austrian politician of the People's Party serving as a member of the National Council since 2013. He has served as mayor of Lambrechten since 2009.
