= Hermann Brückl =

Austrian politician (born 1968)

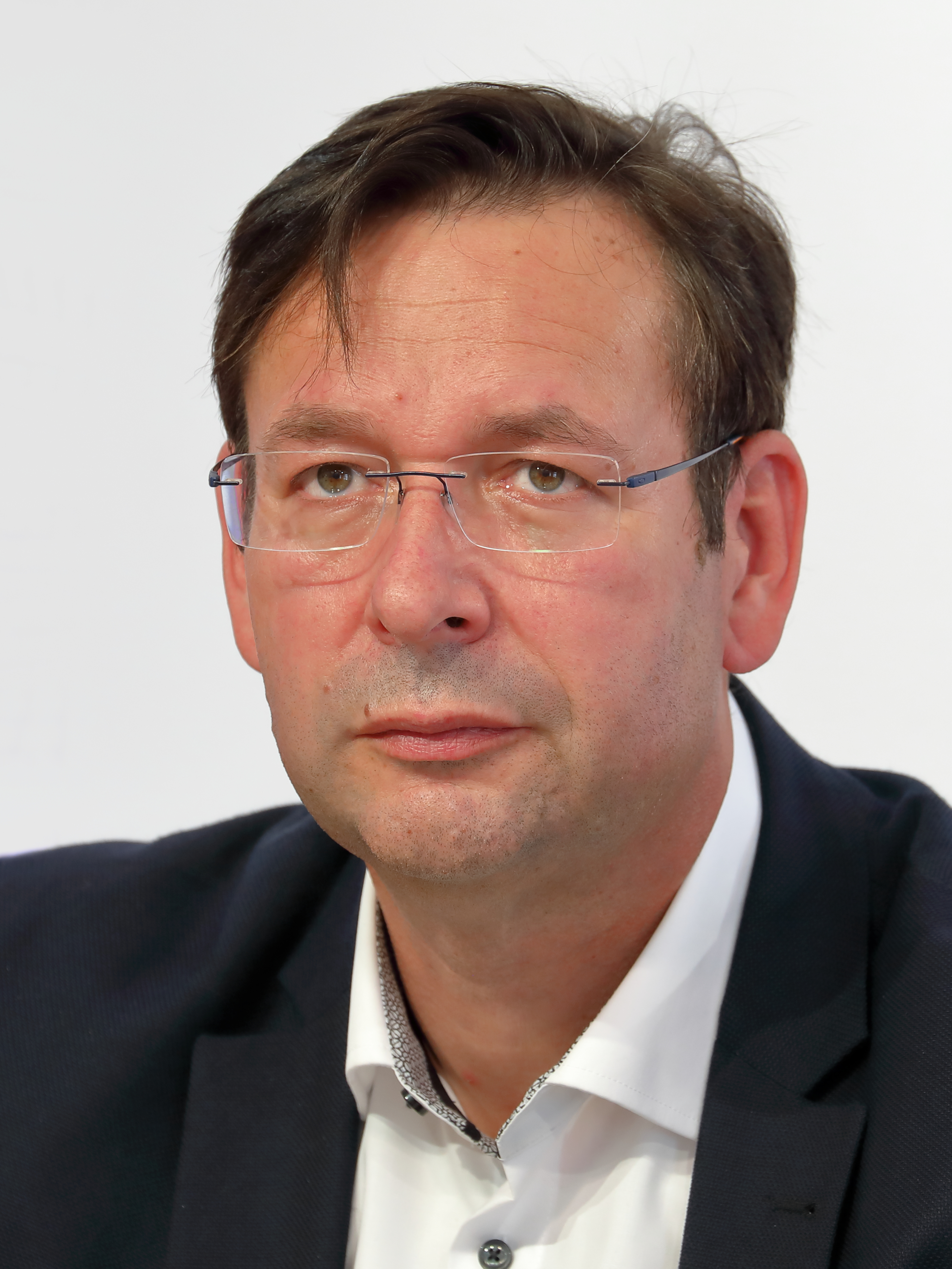

Member of the National Council
- Incumbent
- Assumed office 28 October 2015
- Constituency: 4B Innviertel

Member of the Federal Council
- In office 21 October 2010 – 22 October 2015

Personal details
- Born: 3 November 1968 (age 57)
- Party: Freedom Party of Austria

Hermann Brückl (born 3 November 1968) is an Austrian politician who has been a Member of the National Council for the Freedom Party of Austria (FPÖ) since 2015. He is a former Member of the Federal Council.

== Private Life ==
Brückl is father of a Son.
