= Lambrechten =

- Municipality
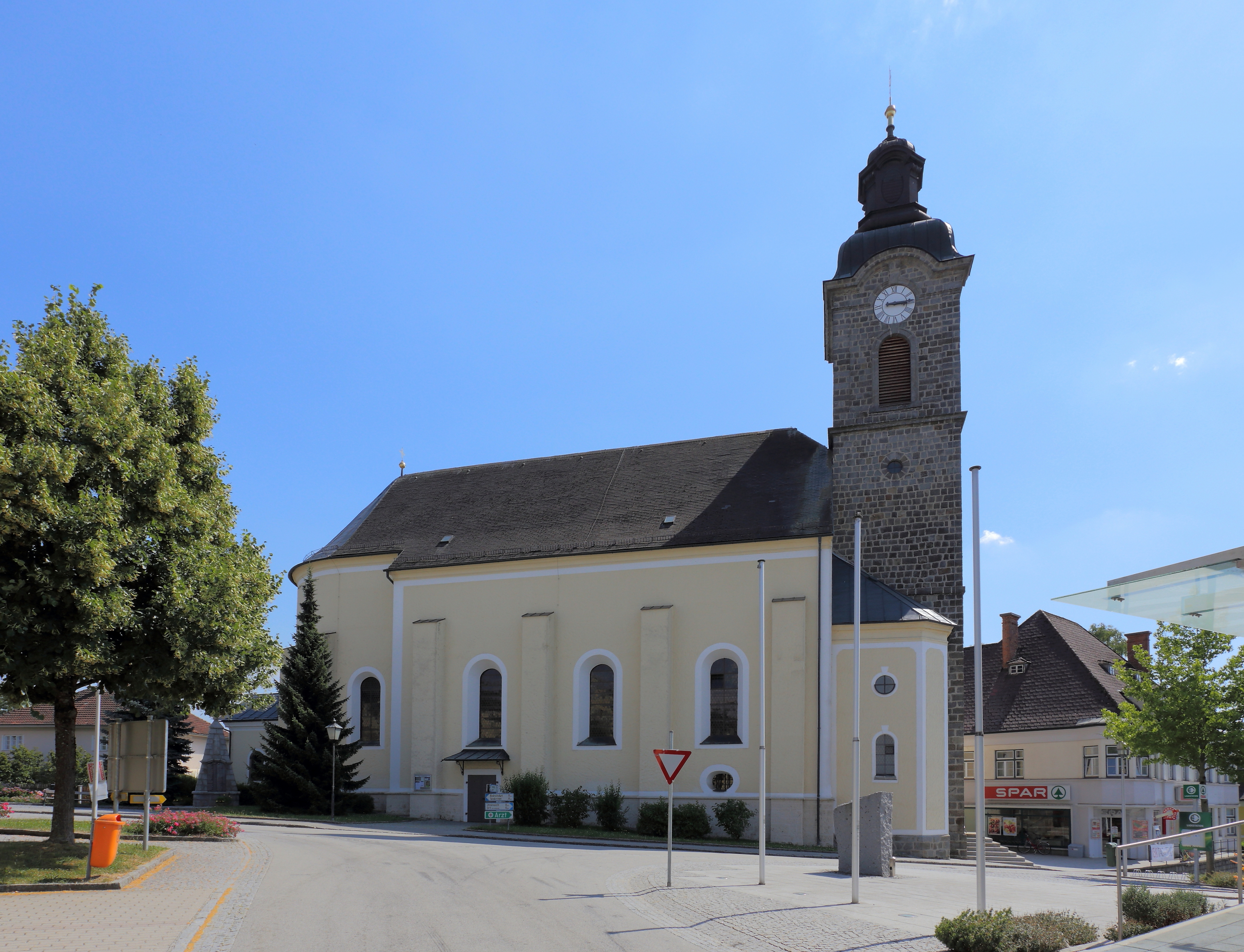

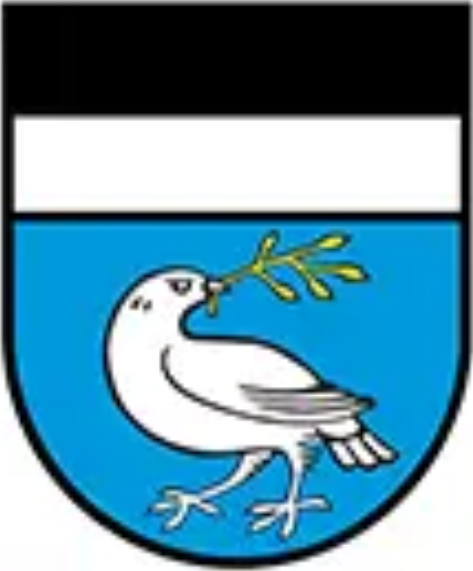
- Coat of arms

- Location within Austria
- Coordinates: 48°19′05″N 13°30′56″E
- Country: Austria
- State: Upper Austria
- District: Ried im Innkreis

Government
  - Mayor: Manfred Hofinger (SPÖ)

Area
  - Total: 23.7 km^{2} (9.2 sq mi)
- Elevation: 406 m (1,332 ft)

Population (2018-01-01)
  - Total: 1,300
  - Density: 55/km^{2} (140/sq mi)
- Time zone: UTC+1 (CET)
  - Summer (DST): UTC+2 (CEST)
- Postal code: 4772
- Area code: 07765
- Vehicle registration: RI
- Website: www.lambrechten.at

Lambrechten is a municipality in the district of Ried im Innkreis in the Austrian state of Upper Austria.

== Geography ==
Lambrechten lies in the Innviertel. About 12 percent of the municipality is forest, and 78 percent is farmland.
