= Norbert Hofer =

Austrian politician (born 1971)

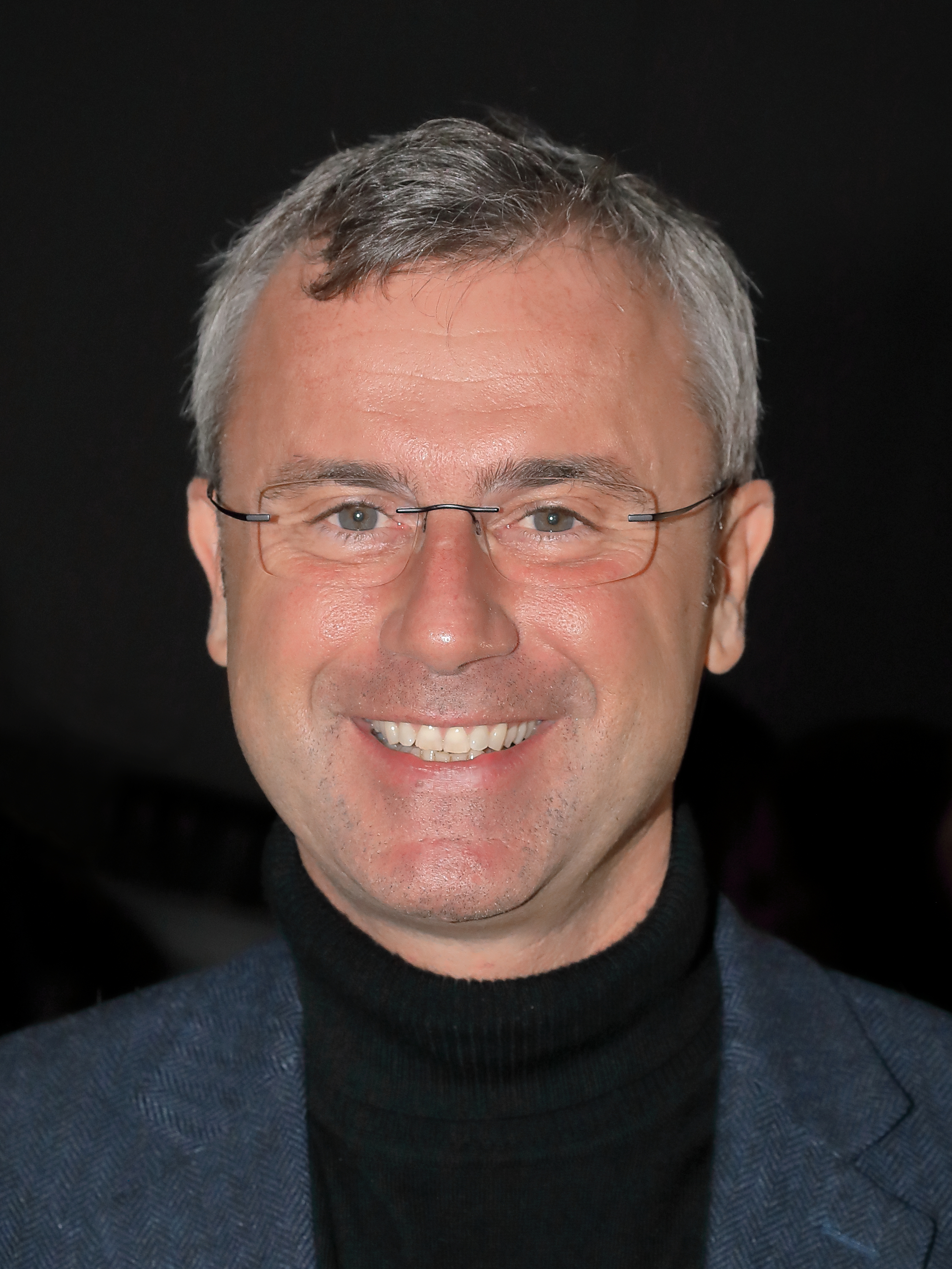
- Hofer in 2019

Third President of the National Council
- In office 23 October 2019 – 23 October 2024
- President: Wolfgang Sobotka
- Preceded by: Anneliese Kitzmüller
- Succeeded by: Doris Bures
- In office 29 October 2013 – 18 December 2017
- Preceded by: Martin Graf
- Succeeded by: Anneliese Kitzmüller

Chair of the Freedom Party
- In office 14 September 2019 – 1 June 2021
- Preceded by: Heinz-Christian Strache
- Succeeded by: Herbert Kickl

Minister of Transport, Innovation and Technology
- In office 18 December 2017 – 22 May 2019
- Chancellor: Sebastian Kurz
- Preceded by: Jörg Leichtfried
- Succeeded by: Valerie Hackl

Member of the National Council
- In office 23 October 2019 – 24 October 2024
- Nominated by: Himself
- Affiliation: Freedom Party
- In office 24 May 2019 – 22 October 2019
- Constituency: 1 – Burgenland
- In office 28 October 2008 – 18 December 2017
- Constituency: 1 – Burgenland
- In office 30 October 2006 – 27 October 2008
- Nominated by: Heinz-Christian Strache
- Affiliation: Freedom Party

Personal details
- Born: Norbert Gerwald Hofer; 2 March 1971 (age 55) Vorau, Hartberg-Fürstenfeld, Styria, Austria
- Party: Freedom Party
- Spouse: Verena Malus
- Children: 4
- Website: Parliament website

Norbert Gerwald Hofer (Austrian German: [ˈnɔrbɛrt ˈhoːfɐ]; born 2 March 1971) is an Austrian politician who was the leader of the Freedom Party of Austria (FPÖ) from June 2019 to June 2021. He previously served as minister of transport, innovation, and technology from 2017 to 2019 under Chancellor Sebastian Kurz.

Hofer served as third president of the National Council from 2013 to 2017. He was his party's candidate in the 2016 presidential election. Hofer won the first round, receiving 35.1%, but was defeated by The Greens' candidate Alexander Van der Bellen, 53.8% against 46.2%, in the final runoff (an earlier runoff was invalidated).

He later served as Minister for Transport in the first Kurz government from 2017 to 2019. He became Leader of the Freedom Party in September 2019, after holding the office in an acting capacity from May to September 2019.

He stepped down as party leader in 2021 after losing a power struggle with Herbert Kickl.

== Early life and education ==
Hofer was born in Vorau, Austria, the son of a local Austrian People's Party (ÖVP) councillor and electric power station director. He was raised in a middle-class family in Pinkafeld, Burgenland.

He finished secondary school at the HTBLA Eisenstadt with specialization in aeronautics. From 1990 until 1991, Hofer fulfilled his military service. From 1991 until 1994 he worked as an aeronautical engineer at Lauda Air Engineering.

== Political career ==
Hofer worked his way up the ranks of the Freedom Party of Austria (FPÖ) and became a close advisor to Heinz-Christian Strache, who took over the leadership of the Freedom Party from Jörg Haider in 2005.

From 1996 to 2007, Hofer was provincial party secretary of the FPÖ in Burgenland and, from 1997 to 2007, council member of the City of Eisenstadt. Since 2006 he has been deputy regional party chairman. From 2008 to 2012, Hofer served as vice president for Burgenland of the Österreichischer Zivilinvalidenverband. He was energy and environmental speaker from 2006 to 2015, as well as FPÖ spokesman for the disabled in the National Council.

Hofer became Third President of Austria's National Council on 29 October 2013. He succeeded Martin Graf in this function.

=== Austrian presidential election, 2016 ===
On 28 January 2016, the FPÖ presented him as its candidate for the 2016 presidential elections. He won the first round of the election, held on 24 April. He placed close second in a neck-and-neck race with Alexander Van der Bellen, the former Green Party spokesman.

He ran on his promise of "putting Austria first" and received the highest number of votes in the first round with 35.1 percent, putting him in a runoff. 24 April vote total was the best-ever result for the Freedom Party at federal level since 1956. Hofer benefited from the recent migrant crisis, where around 90,000 migrants applied for asylum in Austria, straining the country's resources and public empathy. The Freedom Party had opposed the government's original "welcoming culture" and during the summer of 2015 began to lead opinion polls.

Hofer campaigned to dissolve Parliament in order to call new elections. During the campaign he also stated that he would refuse to approve certain laws, such as a planned free-trade agreement between the European Union and the United States, and that he may attend, along with Austrian Chancellor Werner Faymann, EU summits.

Right-wing parties and politicians across Western Europe celebrated Hofer's first-place finish. Those parties and politicians included: Marine Le Pen of France's National Front; Frauke Petry of Alternative for Germany; Geert Wilders of the Dutch Party for Freedom; and Matteo Salvini of Italy's Lega Nord.

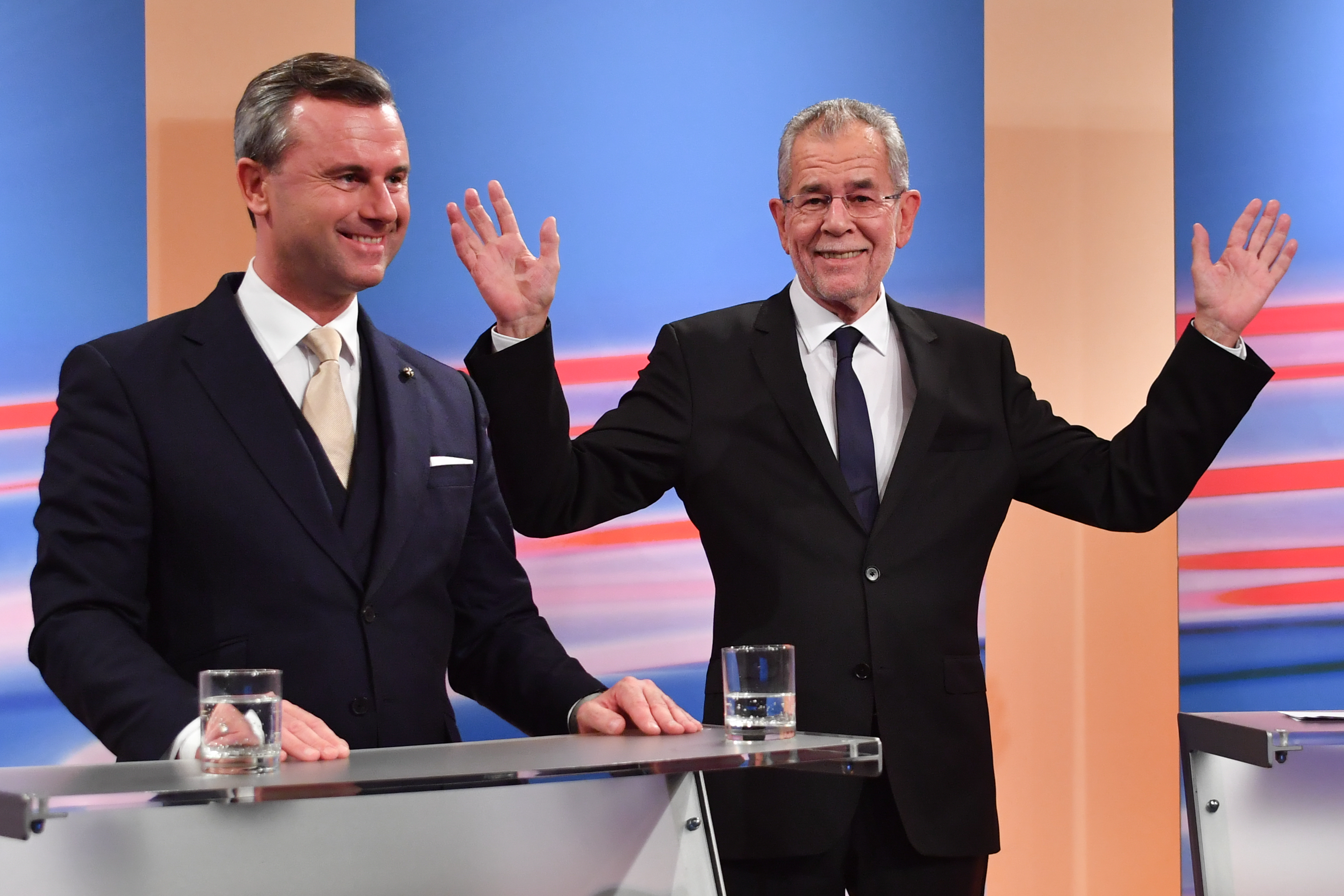
Hofer and Alexander Van der Bellen during a debate (December 2016)

The second round election was held on 22 May 2016, with 49.7% of votes cast for Hofer while Van der Bellen, his opponent, received 50.3%, – a margin of victory of only 30,863. Evidence was subsequently presented to the Constitutional Court of Austria that approximately 78,000 absentee ballots were improperly counted too early, which theoretically could have influenced or altered the outcome. Consequently, on 1 July, the Court annulled the second round results and thereby precluded Van der Bellen being sworn into office, and ordered the election be re-run. Incumbent president Heinz Fischer left office on 8 July, and so the three presidents of the National Council – Doris Bures (Social Democratic Party of Austria), Karlheinz Kopf (ÖVP) and Hofer – became joint acting presidents of Austria.

The Court-ordered election was held on 4 December 2016, with Van der Bellen again emerging as the victor. Despite predictions that election fatigue and cold temperatures would lead to a reduction in participation, voter turnout actually increased from 72.7% in May to 73.8%; expectations for a similarly close result also proved wrong, with the margin of victory for Van der Bellen increasing by approximately a factor of ten as he was supported by around 53.3% of voters. Hofer conceded soon after the first exit polls were reported, posting on Facebook: "I congratulate Alexander Van der Bellen for his success and ask all Austrians to pull together and work together" and added that he "would have liked to look after Austria" and confirmed his intention to run again in 2022. His campaign manager, Herbert Kickl, who is also the secretary of the Freedom party, attributed the defeat to "the establishment – which pitched in once again to block, to stonewall and to prevent renewal." Hofer remained as joint acting president until Van der Bellen was sworn into office on 26 January 2017. Political scientist Farid Hafez argued that nevertheless, it was a huge success for the FPÖ and Norbert Hofer to reach 47% of the votes, while normally, the FPÖ reaches up to 30% at most at a national parliamentary election.

=== Federal minister ===
The FPÖ performed well in the 2017 Austrian legislative election, and it formed a government coalition with the Austrian People's Party. Hofer was chosen to lead the Ministry of Transport, Innovation and Technology.

== Private career ==
Hofer serves on the board of directors of Eurosolar Austria, has served on the boards of Mapjet AG (2010–2011) and International Sky Services AG (2011–2012) and was executive chairman of PAF private trust (2011–2012).

== Ideology and political positions ==
Most mainstream press sources describe Hofer as "far-right". Writer Michael Toner of the centrist online news publication International Business Times referred to Hofer as a neo-fascist. However, other media outlets and political commentators have referred to Hofer as the face of the more moderate wing of the FPÖ and less hard-line compared to former party leader Heinz-Christian Strache.

Hofer himself has stated that he is not a nationalist but a patriot, and that the FPÖ is not an extreme-right movement but "a centre-right party with a high degree of social responsibility." He has also cited former British Prime Minister Margaret Thatcher as one of his political influences.

In February 2015, Hofer proposed that South Tyrol, an autonomous German-speaking province administered by Italy and formerly part of Austria-Hungary, should be absorbed into Austria. In 2016, Hofer stated that he would want Austria to hold a referendum on its membership of the European Union if the European Parliament were to assume more powers or if Turkey acceded to the bloc. Hofer has also defended the right to gun ownership.

Hofer stated that the Quran was more dangerous than COVID-19 during a speech held at a 2020 campaign event. As a result, he was sued for hate-speech.

== Personal life ==
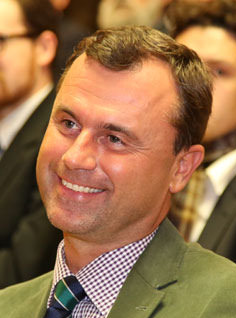
Hofer in 2014

Hofer is in his second marriage and has four children – two daughters, Anna-Sophie and Vivien and two sons, Yanik and Jeremie. He was raised as a Catholic but converted to Protestantism; his wife and children are Catholic. His main residence is in southern Burgenland.

Hofer is an honorary member of the conservative school fraternity (pennal-conservative Burschenschaft) Marko-Germania zu Pinkafeld and an honorary knight of the Order of St. George.

In August 2003 Hofer crashed a paraglider in Stubenberg and received severe spinal injuries. He engaged in six months of rehabilitation, moving from a wheelchair to the use of a cane to walk.

He is a gun enthusiast and carries a Glock handgun.

In June 2026 Hofer's driving license was suspended after a preliminary breathalyzer test conducted by police in Pinkafeld had shown an alcohol level of 2.48 per mille.

In addition to his native German, Hofer also speaks English.

Political offices
Preceded by Martin Graf	Third President of the National Council; 2013–2017	Succeeded by Anneliese Kitzmüller
Preceded by Jörg Leichtfried	Minister of Transport; 2017–2019	Succeeded by Valerie Hackl
Preceded by Anneliese Kitzmüller	Third President of the National Council; 2019–2024	Next: {{{after}}}
Party political offices
Preceded by Heinz-Christian Strache	Chairman of the Freedom Party; 2019–2021	Succeeded by Herbert Kickl
