= Sabine Schatz =

Austrian politician (born 1978)

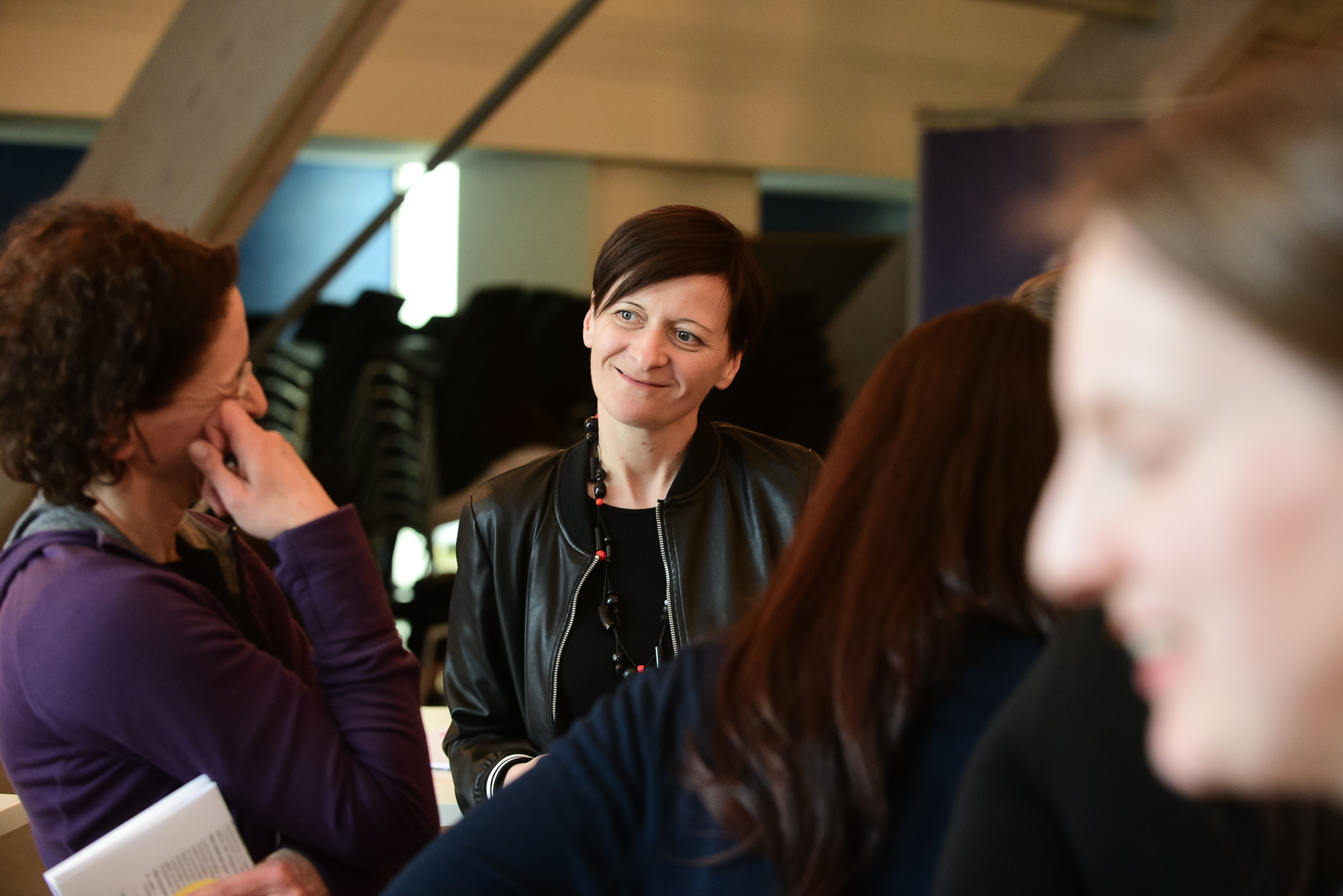
- Schatz in 2018

Member of the National Council
- Incumbent
- Assumed office 9 November 2017
- Constituency: Mühlviertel

Personal details
- Born: 9 September 1978 (age 47)
- Party: Social Democratic Party

Sabine Schatz (born 9 September 1978) is an Austrian politician of the Social Democratic Party. She has been a member of the National Council since 2017, and was a municipal councillor of Ried in der Riedmark from 2003 to 2021.
