= Innviertel (National Council electoral district) =

Parliamentary electoral district in Austria

- Electoral District for the National Council
- Location of Innviertel within Austria
- District: List: Braunau am Inn; Ried im Innkreis; Schärding
- State: Upper Austria
- Population: 232,032 (2024)
- Electorate: 167,189 (2019)
- Area: 2,244 km^{2} (2023)

Current Electoral District
- Created: 1994
- Seats: 5 (1994–present)
- Members: List: Hermann Brückl (FPÖ); Andrea Holzner (ÖVP); August Wöginger (ÖVP)

Innviertel, also known as Electoral District 4B (German: Wahlkreis 4B), is one of the 39 multi-member regional electoral districts of the National Council, the lower house of the Austrian Parliament, the national legislature of Austria. The electoral district was created in 1992 when electoral regulations were amended to add regional electoral districts to the existing state-wide electoral districts and came into being at the following legislative election in 1994. It consists of the districts of Braunau am Inn, Ried im Innkreis and Schärding in the state of Upper Austria. The electoral district currently elects five of the 183 members of the National Council using the open party-list proportional representation electoral system. At the 2019 legislative election the constituency had 167,189 registered electors.

== History ==
Innviertel was one 43 regional electoral districts (regionalwahlkreise) established by the "National Council Electoral Regulations 1992" (Nationalrats-Wahlordnung 1992) passed by the National Council in 1992. It consisted of the districts of Braunau am Inn, Ried im Innkreis and Schärding in the state of Upper Austria. The district was initially allocated five seats in May 1993.

== Electoral system ==
Innviertel currently elects five of the 183 members of the National Council using the open party-list proportional representation electoral system. The allocation of seats is carried out in three stages. In the first stage, seats are allocated to parties (lists) at the regional level using a state-wide Hare quota (wahlzahl) (valid votes in the state divided by the number of seats in the state). In the second stage, seats are allocated to parties at the state/provincial level using the state-wide Hare quota (any seats won by the party at the regional stage are subtracted from the party's state seats). In the third and final stage, seats are allocated to parties at the federal/national level using the D'Hondt method (any seats won by the party at the regional and state stages are subtracted from the party's federal seats). Only parties that reach the 4% national threshold, or have won a seat at the regional stage, compete for seats at the state and federal stages.

Electors may cast one preferential vote for individual candidates at the regional, state and federal levels. Split-ticket voting (panachage), or voting for more than one candidate at each level, is not permitted and will result in the ballot paper being invalidated. At the regional level, candidates must receive preferential votes amounting to at least 14% of the valid votes cast for their party to over-ride the order of the party list (10% and 7% respectively for the state and federal levels). Prior to April 2013 electors could not cast preferential votes at the federal level and the thresholds candidates needed to over-ride the party list order were higher at the regional level (half the Hare quota or 1/6 of the party votes) and state level (Hare quota).

== Election results ==
=== Summary ===
Election	Communists KPÖ+ / KPÖ			Social Democrats SPÖ			Greens GRÜNE			NEOS NEOS / LiF			People's ÖVP			Freedom FPÖ		
Election	Votes	%	Seats	Votes	%	Seats	Votes	%	Seats	Votes	%	Seats	Votes	%	Seats	Votes	%	Seats
2019	605	0.48%	0	19,734	15.80%	0	12,882	10.31%	0	7,663	6.14%	0	54,648	43.75%	2	27,322	21.88%	1
2017	500	0.38%	0	27,052	20.46%	0	3,880	2.93%	0	5,256	3.98%	0	47,826	36.18%	1	42,573	32.20%	1
2013	639	0.52%	0	26,429	21.59%	1	11,312	9.24%	0	3,161	2.58%	0	37,107	30.31%	1	31,077	25.39%	1
2008	613	0.48%	0	29,720	23.51%	1	9,734	7.70%	0	1,069	0.85%	0	40,590	32.11%	1	28,801	22.79%	1
2006	878	0.73%	0	33,427	27.67%	1	9,476	7.84%	0				51,114	42.31%	1	18,753	15.52%	0
2002	601	0.47%	0	36,501	28.80%	1	8,528	6.73%	0	904	0.71%	0	62,605	49.40%	2	17,585	13.88%	0
1999	327	0.27%	0	32,157	26.30%	1	7,391	6.05%	0	2,248	1.84%	0	39,456	32.27%	1	39,400	32.23%	1
1995	206	0.16%	0	37,803	30.01%	1	5,669	4.50%	0	3,994	3.17%	0	42,377	33.64%	1	34,567	27.44%	1
1994	172	0.14%	0	32,966	27.20%	1	7,700	6.35%	0	3,941	3.25%	0	41,375	34.13%	1	33,162	27.36%	1

=== Detailed ===
==== 2010s ====
===== 2019 =====
Results of the 2019 legislative election held on 29 September 2019:

Party		Votes per district				Total votes	%	Seats
Party		Braunau am Inn	Ried im Innkreis	Schär- ding	Voting card	Total votes	%	Seats
Austrian People's Party	ÖVP	23,970	14,904	15,699	75	54,648	43.75%	2
Freedom Party of Austria	FPÖ	11,462	7,882	7,941	37	27,322	21.88%	1
Social Democratic Party of Austria	SPÖ	9,335	5,228	5,122	49	19,734	15.80%	0
The Greens	GRÜNE	5,529	4,011	3,218	124	12,882	10.31%	0
NEOS – The New Austria and Liberal Forum	NEOS	3,349	2,378	1,867	69	7,663	6.14%	0
JETZT	JETZT	734	415	306	10	1,465	1.17%	0
KPÖ Plus	KPÖ+	289	158	154	4	605	0.48%	0
Der Wandel	WANDL	266	142	138	8	554	0.44%	0
Socialist Left Party	SLP	17	4	5	0	26	0.02%	0
Valid Votes		54,951	35,122	34,450	376	124,899	100.00%	3
Rejected Votes		865	513	484	3	1,865	1.47%	
Total Polled		55,816	35,635	34,934	379	126,764	75.82%	
Registered Electors		76,045	46,593	44,551		167,189		
Turnout		73.40%	76.48%	78.41%		75.82%		

The following candidates were elected:

- Personal mandates - August Wöginger (ÖVP), 9,420 votes.
- Party mandates - Hermann Brückl (FPÖ), 2,092 votes; and Manfred Hofinger (ÖVP), 2,985 votes. (Note: ÖVP: 2nd placed candidate Andrea Holzner was elected in Upper Austria.)

Substitutions:

- Manfred Hofinger (ÖVP) was reassigned to the Upper Austria seat vacated by Claudia Plakolm and was replaced by Andrea Holzner (ÖVP) in Innviertel on 9 December 2021.

===== 2017 =====
Results of the 2017 legislative election held on 15 October 2017:

Party		Votes per district				Total votes	%	Seats
Party		Braunau am Inn	Ried im Innkreis	Schär- ding	Voting card	Total votes	%	Seats
Austrian People's Party	ÖVP	20,322	13,392	14,018	94	47,826	36.18%	1
Freedom Party of Austria	FPÖ	18,513	11,872	12,115	73	42,573	32.20%	1
Social Democratic Party of Austria	SPÖ	12,742	7,396	6,829	85	27,052	20.46%	0
NEOS – The New Austria and Liberal Forum	NEOS	2,317	1,631	1,240	68	5,256	3.98%	0
The Greens	GRÜNE	1,629	1,243	971	37	3,880	2.93%	0
Peter Pilz List	PILZ	1,800	940	797	46	3,583	2.71%	0
My Vote Counts!	GILT	506	318	266	10	1,100	0.83%	0
Communist Party of Austria	KPÖ	227	138	124	11	500	0.38%	0
The Whites	WEIßE	115	78	57	0	250	0.19%	0
Free List Austria	FLÖ	99	38	28	0	165	0.12%	0
Socialist Left Party	SLP	2	7	12	0	21	0.02%	0
Valid Votes		58,272	37,053	36,457	424	132,206	100.00%	2
Rejected Votes		739	482	409	1	1,631	1.22%	
Total Polled		59,011	37,535	36,866	425	133,837	80.10%	
Registered Electors		75,992	46,489	44,612		167,093		
Turnout		77.65%	80.74%	82.64%		80.10%		

The following candidates were elected:

- Personal mandates - August Wöginger (ÖVP), 7,110 votes.
- Party mandates - Hermann Brückl (FPÖ), 3,186 votes.

===== 2013 =====
Results of the 2013 legislative election held on 29 September 2013:

Party		Votes per district				Total votes	%	Seats
Party		Braunau am Inn	Ried im Innkreis	Schär- ding	Voting card	Total votes	%	Seats
Austrian People's Party	ÖVP	15,262	10,521	11,246	78	37,107	30.31%	1
Freedom Party of Austria	FPÖ	13,426	8,894	8,704	53	31,077	25.39%	1
Social Democratic Party of Austria	SPÖ	12,739	6,884	6,765	41	26,429	21.59%	1
The Greens	GRÜNE	5,053	3,386	2,752	121	11,312	9.24%	0
Team Stronach	FRANK	2,651	1,570	1,548	15	5,784	4.73%	0
Alliance for the Future of Austria	BZÖ	1,891	1,432	1,951	17	5,291	4.32%	0
NEOS – The New Austria	NEOS	1,365	1,040	723	33	3,161	2.58%	0
Pirate Party of Austria	PIRAT	369	262	220	7	858	0.70%	0
Communist Party of Austria	KPÖ	277	178	180	4	639	0.52%	0
Christian Party of Austria	CPÖ	181	152	127	1	461	0.38%	0
Der Wandel	WANDL	78	69	141	1	289	0.24%	0
Valid Votes		53,292	34,388	34,357	371	122,408	100.00%	3
Rejected Votes		1,555	942	876	6	3,379	2.69%	
Total Polled		54,847	35,330	35,233	377	125,787	75.63%	
Registered Electors		75,446	46,264	44,610		166,320		
Turnout		72.70%	76.37%	78.98%		75.63%		

The following candidates were elected:

- Personal mandates - August Wöginger (ÖVP), 5,295 votes.
- Party mandates - Harry Buchmayr (SPÖ), 2,410 votes; and Elmar Podgorschek (FPÖ), 2,602 votes.

Substitutions:

- Elmar Podgorschek (FPÖ) resigned on 22 October 2015 and was replaced by Hermann Brückl (FPÖ) on 28 October 2015.

==== 2000s ====
===== 2008 =====
Results of the 2008 legislative election held on 28 September 2008:

Party		Votes per district				Total votes	%	Seats
Party		Braunau am Inn	Ried im Innkreis	Schär- ding	Voting card	Total votes	%	Seats
Austrian People's Party	ÖVP	16,235	11,565	12,488	302	40,590	32.11%	1
Social Democratic Party of Austria	SPÖ	14,130	7,624	7,829	137	29,720	23.51%	1
Freedom Party of Austria	FPÖ	11,804	8,767	8,115	115	28,801	22.79%	1
Alliance for the Future of Austria	BZÖ	6,034	3,014	2,895	104	12,047	9.53%	0
The Greens	GRÜNE	4,338	2,921	2,193	282	9,734	7.70%	0
Independent Citizens' Initiative Save Austria	RETTÖ	653	343	462	11	1,469	1.16%	0
Fritz Dinkhauser List – Citizens' Forum Tyrol	FRITZ	607	378	355	10	1,350	1.07%	0
Liberal Forum	LiF	491	319	223	36	1,069	0.85%	0
The Christians	DC	376	326	243	10	955	0.76%	0
Communist Party of Austria	KPÖ	265	182	158	8	613	0.48%	0
Left	LINKE	24	13	9	2	48	0.04%	0
Valid Votes		54,957	35,452	34,970	1,017	126,396	100.00%	3
Rejected Votes		1,871	1,185	1,033	26	4,115	3.15%	
Total Polled		56,828	36,637	36,003	1,043	130,511	79.06%	
Registered Electors		74,829	45,769	44,487		165,085		
Turnout		75.94%	80.05%	80.93%		79.06%		

The following candidates were elected:

- Party mandates - Marianne Hagenhofer (SPÖ), 3,296 votes; Peter Mayer (ÖVP), 4,690 votes; and Lutz Weinzinger (FPÖ), 2,787 votes.

Substitutions:

- Lutz Weinzinger (FPÖ) resigned on 20 October 2010 and was replaced by Elmar Podgorschek (FPÖ) on 21 October 2010.
- Marianne Hagenhofer (SPÖ) resigned on 19 January 2011 and was replaced by Harry Buchmayr (SPÖ) on 20 January 2011.

===== 2006 =====
Results of the 2006 legislative election held on 1 October 2006:

Party		Votes per district				Total votes	%	Seats
Party		Braunau am Inn	Ried im Innkreis	Schär- ding	Voting card	Total votes	%	Seats
Austrian People's Party	ÖVP	20,325	13,836	14,888	2,065	51,114	42.31%	1
Social Democratic Party of Austria	SPÖ	15,513	8,349	8,382	1,183	33,427	27.67%	1
Freedom Party of Austria	FPÖ	6,906	5,937	5,418	492	18,753	15.52%	0
The Greens	GRÜNE	3,707	2,657	1,939	1,173	9,476	7.84%	0
Alliance for the Future of Austria	BZÖ	1,800	908	940	119	3,767	3.12%	0
Hans-Peter Martin's List	MATIN	1,633	845	782	137	3,397	2.81%	0
Communist Party of Austria	KPÖ	396	216	218	48	878	0.73%	0
Valid Votes		50,280	32,748	32,567	5,217	120,812	100.00%	2
Rejected Votes		1,444	795	821	206	3,266	2.63%	
Total Polled		51,724	33,543	33,388	5,423	124,078	78.24%	
Registered Electors		71,701	44,141	42,741		158,583		
Turnout		72.14%	75.99%	78.12%		78.24%		

The following candidates were elected:

- Party mandates - Karl Freund (ÖVP), 7,361 votes; and Marianne Hagenhofer (SPÖ), 3,788 votes.

===== 2002 =====
Results of the 2002 legislative election held on 24 November 2002:

Party		Votes per district				Total votes	%	Seats
Party		Braunau am Inn	Ried im Innkreis	Schär- ding	Voting card	Total votes	%	Seats
Austrian People's Party	ÖVP	25,391	17,248	18,271	1,695	62,605	49.40%	2
Social Democratic Party of Austria	SPÖ	17,463	9,250	9,012	776	36,501	28.80%	1
Freedom Party of Austria	FPÖ	6,981	5,442	4,880	282	17,585	13.88%	0
The Greens	GRÜNE	3,559	2,257	1,740	972	8,528	6.73%	0
Liberal Forum	LiF	444	210	196	54	904	0.71%	0
Communist Party of Austria	KPÖ	279	162	140	20	601	0.47%	0
Valid Votes		54,117	34,569	34,239	3,799	126,724	100.00%	3
Rejected Votes		1,130	678	604	40	2,452	1.90%	
Total Polled		55,247	35,247	34,843	3,839	129,176	84.41%	
Registered Electors		68,887	42,589	41,551		153,027		
Turnout		80.20%	82.76%	83.86%		84.41%		

The following candidates were elected:

- Party mandates - Karl Freund (ÖVP), 8,383 votes; Marianne Hagenhofer (SPÖ), 3,765 votes; and August Wöginger (ÖVP), 2,627 votes.

==== 1990s ====
===== 1999 =====
Results of the 1999 legislative election held on 3 October 1999:

Party		Votes per district				Total votes	%	Seats
Party		Braunau am Inn	Ried im Innkreis	Schär- ding	Voting card	Total votes	%	Seats
Austrian People's Party	ÖVP	14,784	11,169	12,309	1,194	39,456	32.27%	1
Freedom Party of Austria	FPÖ	16,694	11,138	10,532	1,036	39,400	32.23%	1
Social Democratic Party of Austria	SPÖ	15,159	7,991	7,997	1,010	32,157	26.30%	1
The Greens	GRÜNE	3,025	2,144	1,532	690	7,391	6.05%	0
Liberal Forum	LiF	927	564	423	334	2,248	1.84%	0
The Independents	DU	294	225	140	26	685	0.56%	0
No to NATO and EU – Neutral Austria Citizens' Initiative	NEIN	275	170	139	15	599	0.49%	0
Communist Party of Austria	KPÖ	158	89	63	17	327	0.27%	0
Valid Votes		51,316	33,490	33,135	4,322	122,263	100.00%	3
Rejected Votes		1,079	591	580	53	2,303	1.85%	
Total Polled		52,395	34,081	33,715	4,375	124,566	82.54%	
Registered Electors		67,984	41,799	41,130		150,913		
Turnout		77.07%	81.54%	81.97%		82.54%		

The following candidates were elected:

- Party mandates - Karl Freund (ÖVP), 5,833 votes; Marianne Hagenhofer (SPÖ), 2,711 votes; and Alois Pumberger (FPÖ), 3,512 votes.

===== 1995 =====
Results of the 1995 legislative election held on 17 December 1995:

Party		Votes per district				Total votes	%	Seats
Party		Braunau am Inn	Ried im Innkreis	Schär- ding	Voting card	Total votes	%	Seats
Austrian People's Party	ÖVP	16,439	11,928	13,012	998	42,377	33.64%	1
Social Democratic Party of Austria	SPÖ	17,954	9,562	9,511	776	37,803	30.01%	1
Freedom Party of Austria	FPÖ	15,005	9,710	9,312	540	34,567	27.44%	1
The Greens	GRÜNE	2,346	1,552	1,156	615	5,669	4.50%	0
Liberal Forum	LiF	1,762	1,018	753	461	3,994	3.17%	0
No – Civic Action Group; Against the Sale of Austria	NEIN	568	477	293	35	1,373	1.09%	0
Communist Party of Austria	KPÖ	116	42	39	9	206	0.16%	0
Valid Votes		54,190	34,289	34,076	3,434	125,989	100.00%	3
Rejected Votes		1,531	893	857	38	3,319	2.57%	
Total Polled		55,721	35,182	34,933	3,472	129,308	87.09%	
Registered Electors		66,919	41,093	40,469		148,481		
Turnout		83.27%	85.62%	86.32%		87.09%		

The following candidates were elected:

- Party mandates - Karl Freund (ÖVP), 4,724 votes; Marianne Hagenhofer (SPÖ), 3,323 votes; and Alois Pumberger (FPÖ), 4,037 votes.

===== 1994 =====
Results of the 1994 legislative election held on 9 October 1994:

Party		Votes per district				Total votes	%	Seats
Party		Braunau am Inn	Ried im Innkreis	Schär- ding	Voting card	Total votes	%	Seats
Austrian People's Party	ÖVP	15,461	11,469	13,356	1,089	41,375	34.13%	1
Freedom Party of Austria	FPÖ	14,026	9,539	8,949	648	33,162	27.36%	1
Social Democratic Party of Austria	SPÖ	15,787	8,367	8,115	697	32,966	27.20%	1
The Greens	GRÜNE	3,313	2,079	1,656	652	7,700	6.35%	0
Liberal Forum	LiF	1,748	1,065	745	383	3,941	3.25%	0
No – Civic Action Group; Against the Sale of Austria	NEIN	395	248	208	31	882	0.73%	0
Christian Voters Community	CWG	198	165	71	26	460	0.38%	0
Natural Law Party	ÖNP	80	251	71	23	425	0.35%	0
Communist Party of Austria	KPÖ	93	47	30	2	172	0.14%	0
United Greens Austria – List Adi Pinter	VGÖ	43	38	45	5	131	0.11%	0
Valid Votes		51,144	33,268	33,246	3,556	121,214	100.00%	3
Rejected Votes		1,313	655	727	42	2,737	2.21%	
Total Polled		52,457	33,923	33,973	3,598	123,951	83.45%	
Registered Electors		66,872	41,120	40,549		148,541		
Turnout		78.44%	82.50%	83.78%		83.45%		

The following candidates were elected:

- Party mandates - Karl Freund (ÖVP), 6,560 votes; Marianne Hagenhofer (SPÖ), 3,651 votes; and Alois Pumberger (FPÖ), 4,798 votes.
