= Johanna Jachs =

Austrian politician (born 1991)

Member of the National Council
- Incumbent
- Assumed office 9 November 2017
- Constituency: Mühlviertel

Personal details
- Born: 16 October 1991 (age 34)
- Party: Austrian People's Party

Johanna Jachs (born 16 October 1991) is an Austrian politician of the Austrian People's Party serving as a member of the National Council. She was first elected in the 2017 legislative election, and was re-elected in the 2019 election. From 2013 to 2022, she was the leader of the Young People's Party in Freistadt.
