= Valerie Hackl =

Austrian businesswoman

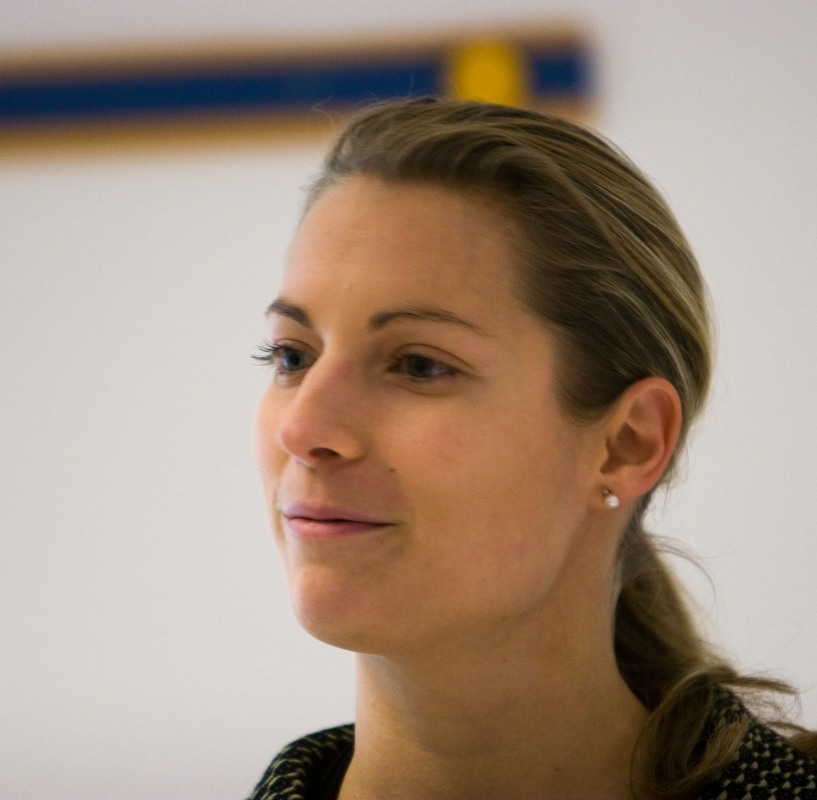
- Valerie Hackl in 2009

Minister of Transport
- In office 22 May 2019 – 3 June 2019
- Chancellor: Sebastian Kurz
- Preceded by: Norbert Hofer
- Succeeded by: Andreas Reichhard

Personal details
- Born: 29 August 1982 (age 42); Vienna, Austria

Valerie Hackl (born 29 August 1982) is an Austrian businesswoman and the managing director of Austro Control. In 2019, she briefly served as minister of infrastructure.

Under Christian Kern Valerie Hackl had become a member of the board of ÖBB Personenverkehrs AG, before Kern became SPÖ leader.

Between 1996–1998 Hackl was multiple Austrian national champion in rhythmic gymnastics.
