= Altenberg bei Linz =

- Municipality
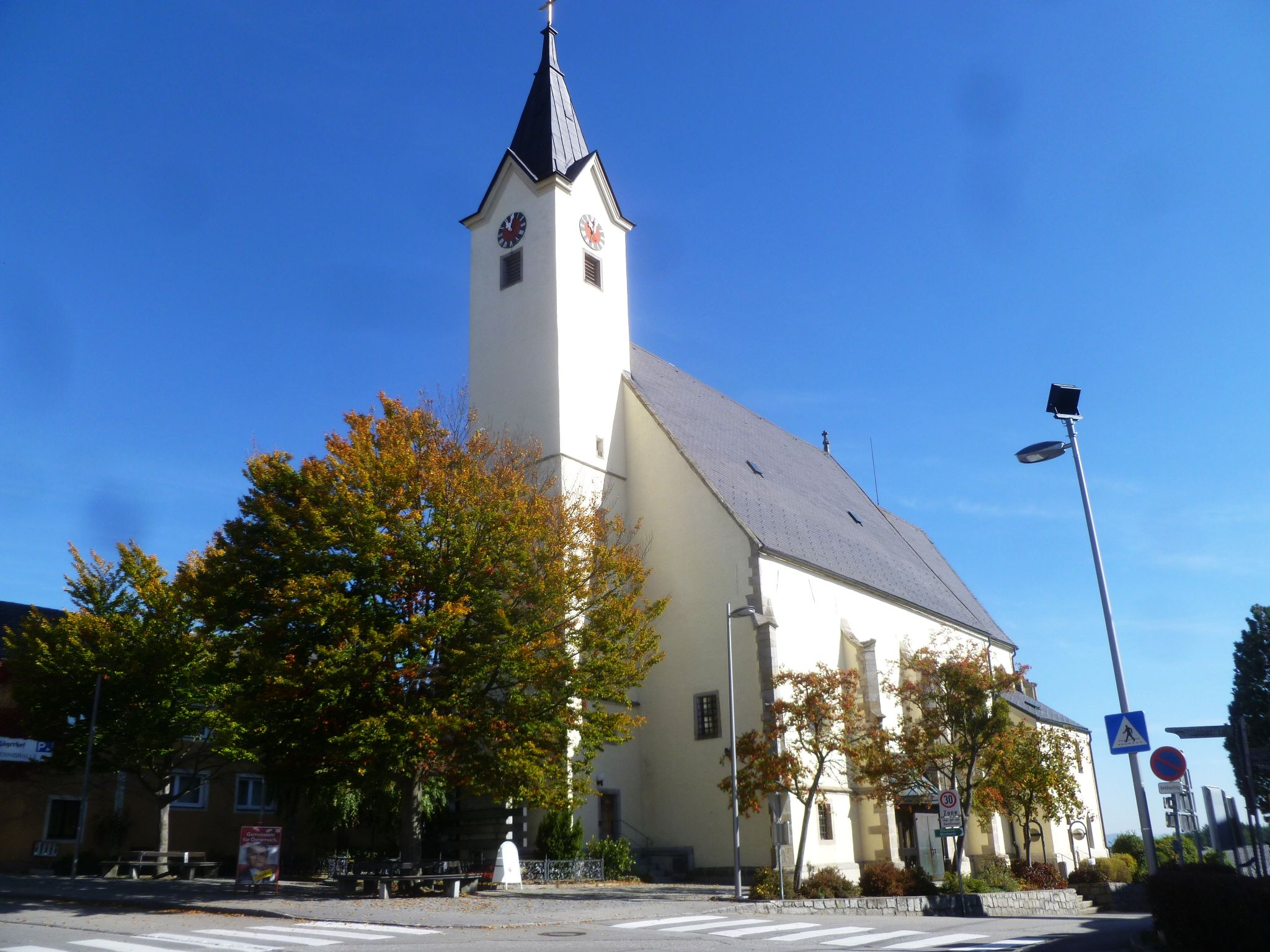

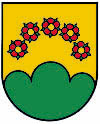
- Coat of arms

- Location within Austria
- Coordinates: 48°22′23″N 14°21′01″E
- Country: Austria
- State: Upper Austria
- District: Urfahr-Umgebung

Government
  - Mayor: Michael Hammer (ÖVP)

Area
  - Total: 36.2 km^{2} (14.0 sq mi)
- Elevation: 592 m (1,942 ft)

Population (2023)
  - Total: 4,740
  - Density: 131/km^{2} (339/sq mi)
- Time zone: UTC+1 (CET)
  - Summer (DST): UTC+2 (CEST)
- Postal code: 4203
- Area code: 0 72 30
- Vehicle registration: UU
- Website: www.altenberg.at

Altenberg bei Linz is a municipality in the district of Urfahr-Umgebung in the Mühlviertel region in the Austrian state of Upper Austria.

== Geography ==
Located on a southern part of the Zentralmühlviertler Hochland at an altitude of 592 meters, the municipality has a view over the Mühlviertel region, Linz, the capital of Upper Austria as well as the so-called Zentralland and even the foothills of the Northern Limestone Alps. Because of that, it has been described as the "Balcony of Linz".

== History ==
Neolithical finds, show that nomadic hunter-gatherers lived in the region at least temporarily. Celtic Boii and Varisci people settled in the region in pre-Christian times. After conflicts with the Pannonian Avars, slavs are presumed to have moved to region in the 8th century. The Slavic roots of the village name Kulm is a reminder of this. In the 9th century a further wave of bavarian immigrants moved there. In 1245 a document from Passau mentioned a man named "Dominus Karolus de Alkenperge". 3 years later, another document from Passau mentioned the village. This time as "Altenperge".

=== Cultural heritage sites ===
As of 2023, there a four cultural heritage sites in Altenberg.

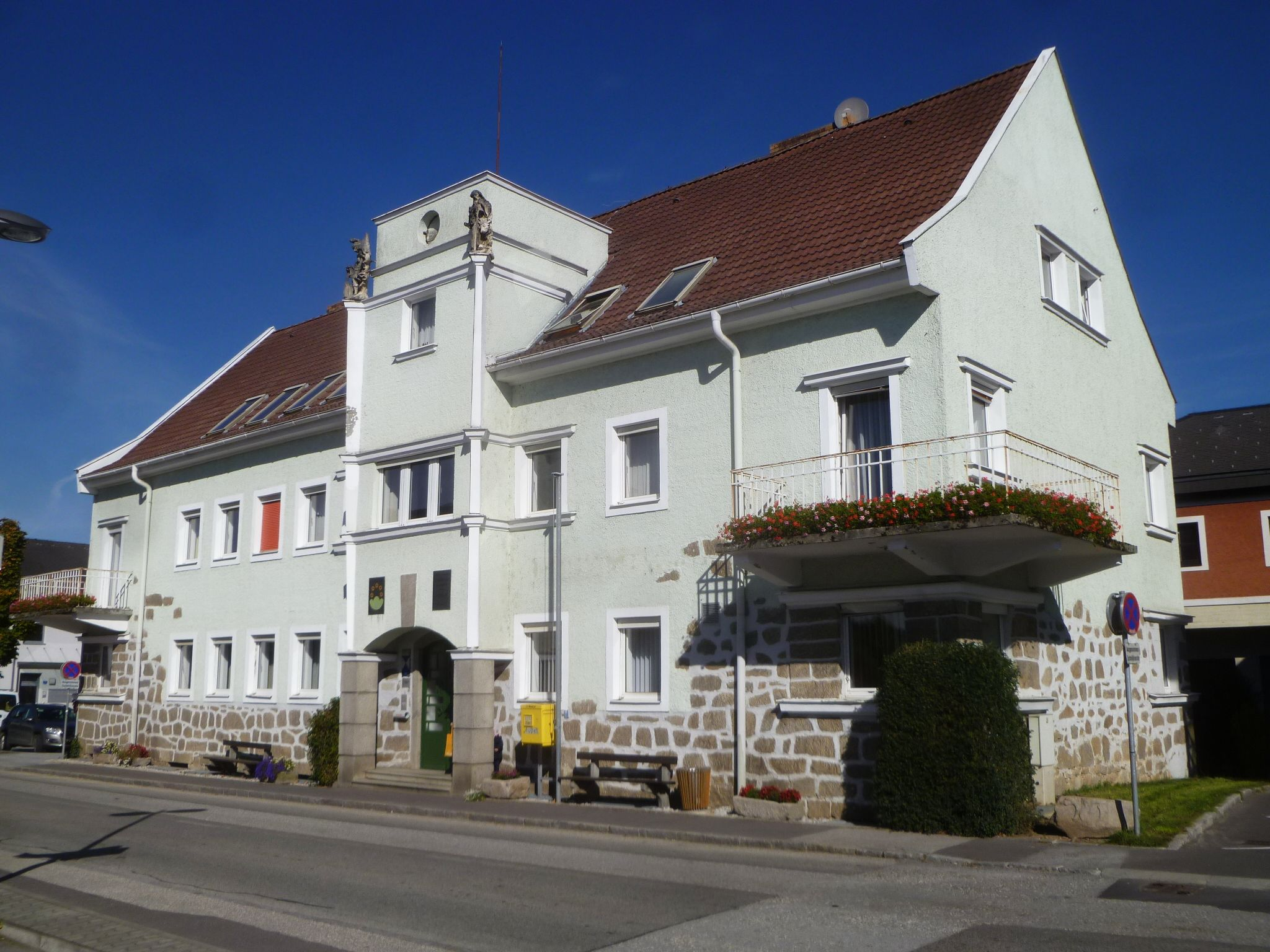
The Gemeindeamt of Altenberg bei Linz at Reichenauer Straße 4, built by Mauriz Balzarek from 1927 to 1930.

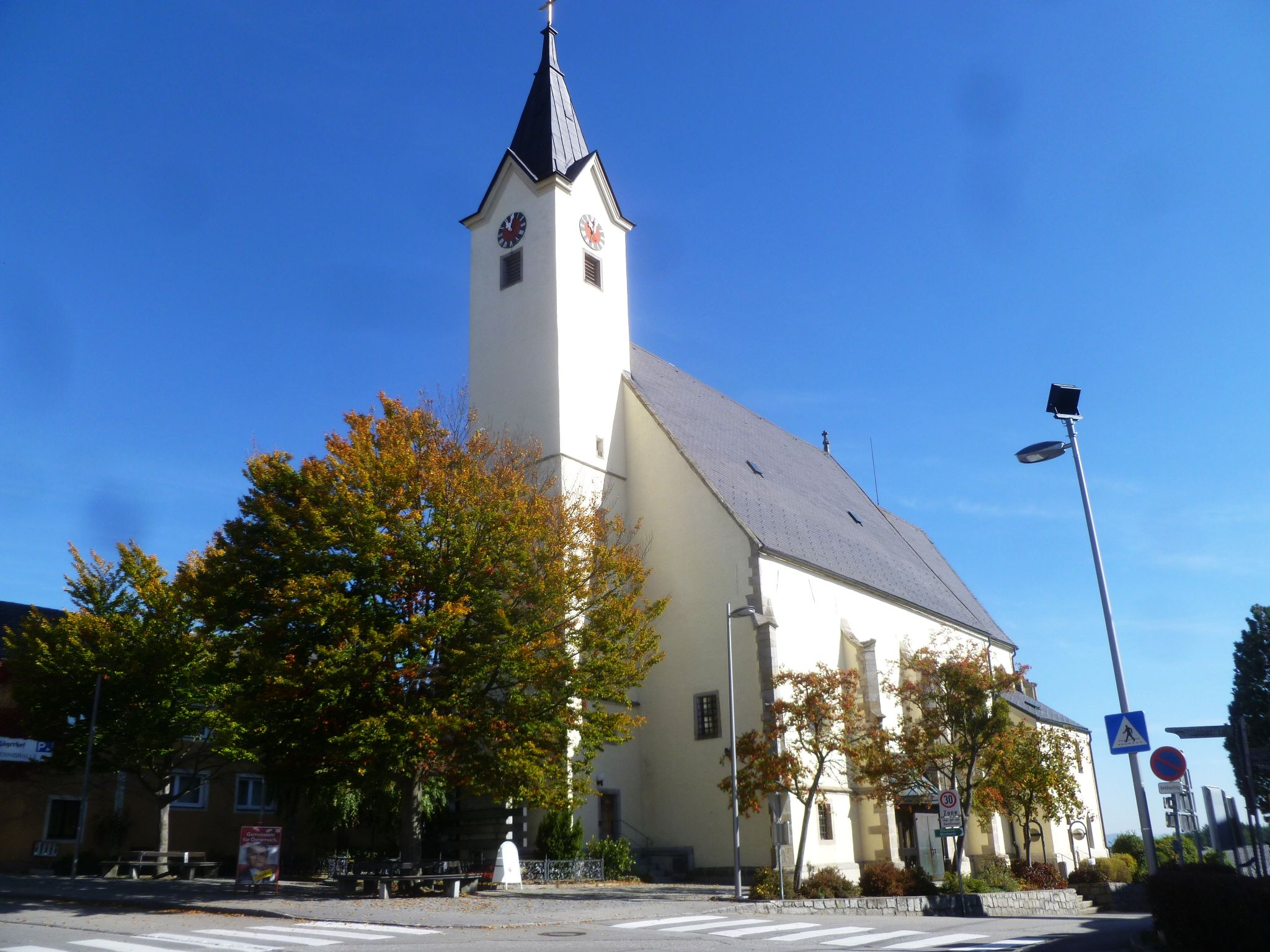
The Late Gothic Catholic church of the Elisabeth of Hungary. It was partially destroyed by lightning strikes and rebuilt in 1742 and 1866. (Schulstraße 1)

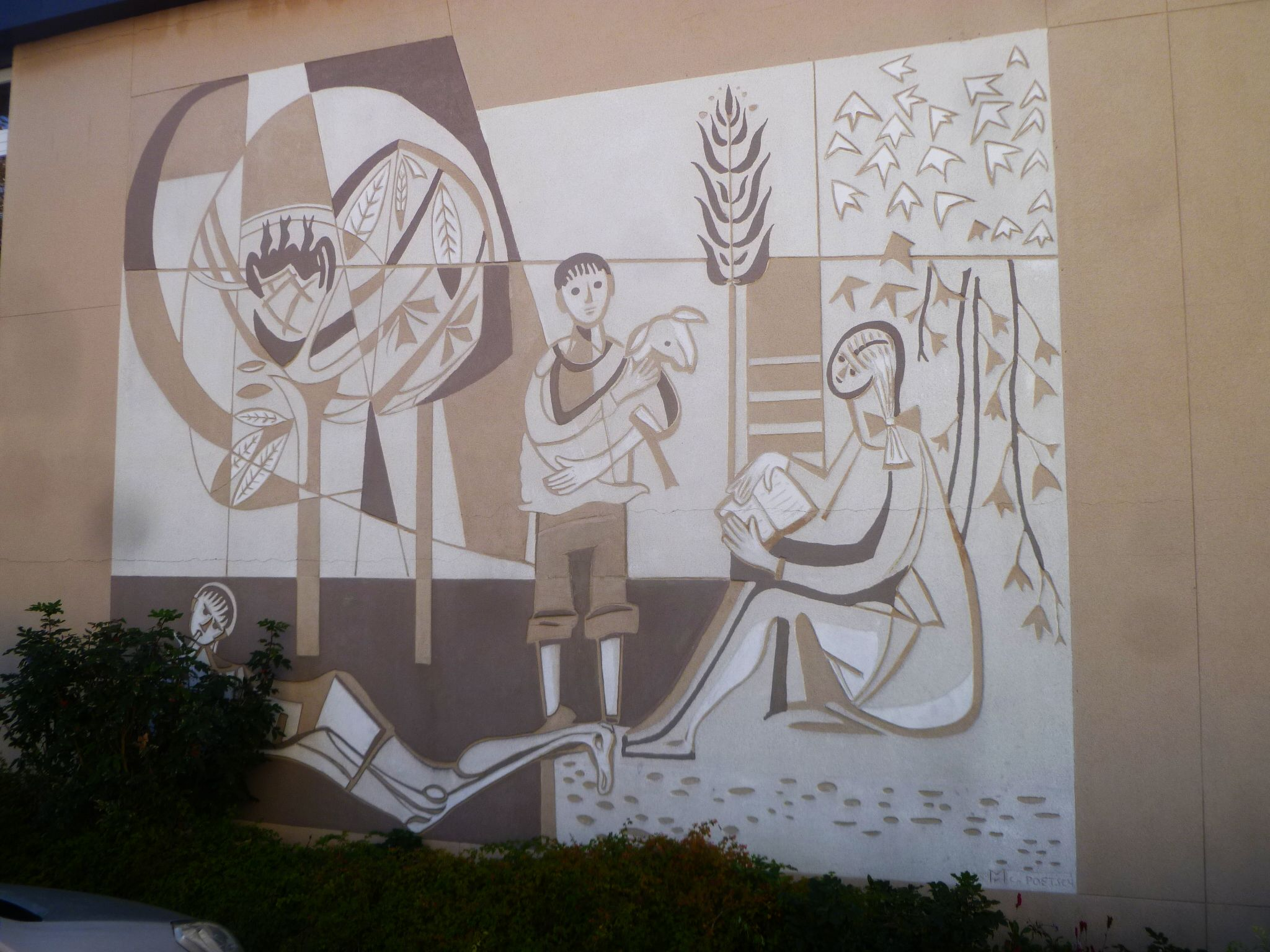
Work of art on a building's wall (Schulstraße 12)

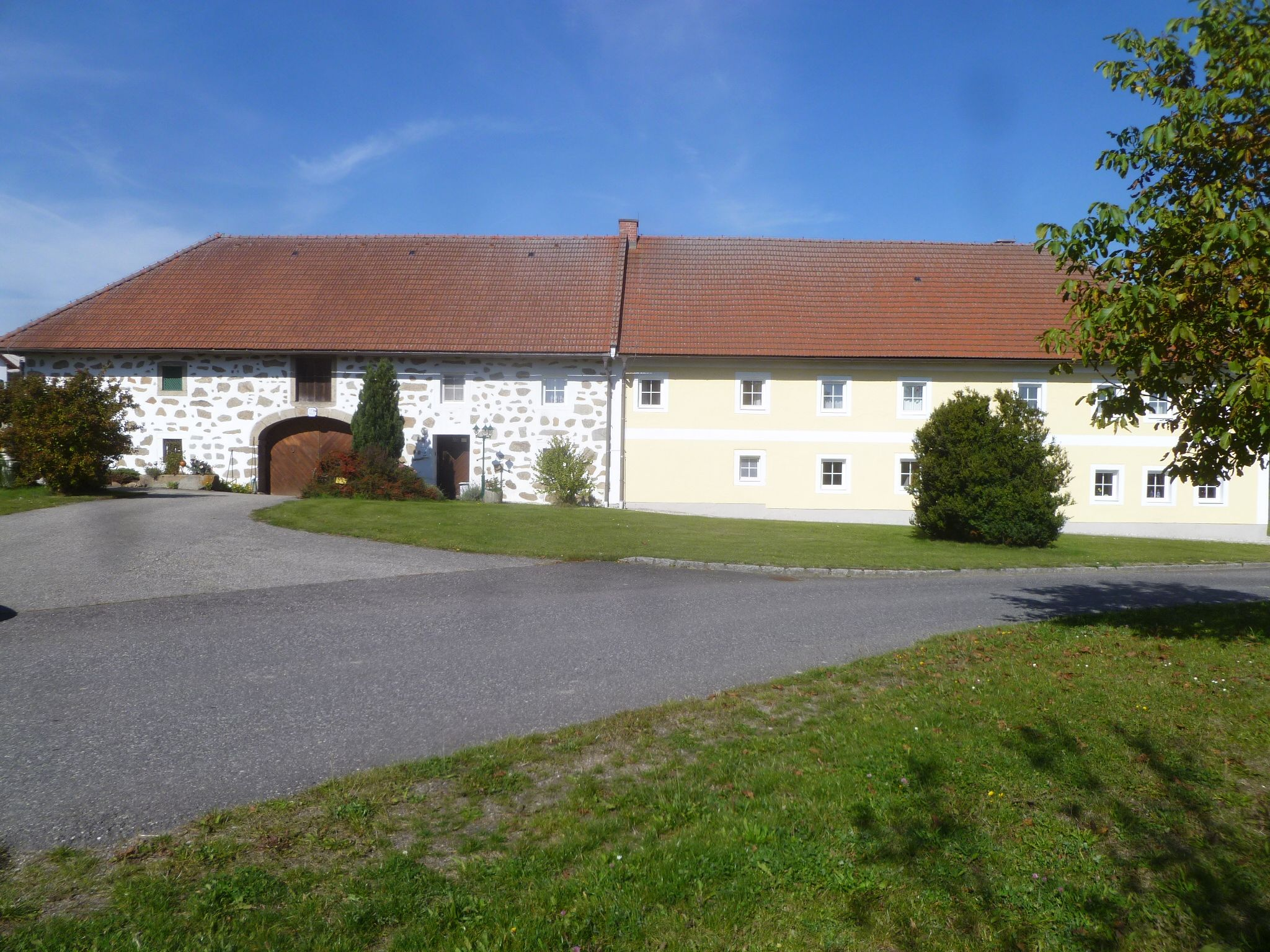
A Farm from the 19th century (Kulm 11)

== Population ==
Historical population
Year	Pop.	±%
1991	3,739	—
2001	4,211	+12.6%
2011	4,407	+4.7%
2018	4,553	+3.3%
2022	4,696	+3.1%
2023	4,740	+0.9%

== Villages ==
The municipal area comprises the following 25 villages (followed by their population as of 1 January 2023):

- Altenberg bei Linz (main village): 1.033
- Donach: 244
- Edt: 171
- Haslach: 750
- Katzgraben: 196
- Kitzelsbach: 168
- Kulm: 121
- Niederbairing: 252
- Niederkulm: 10
- Niederwinkl: 230
- Oberbairing: 492
- Oberkulm: 36
- Oberweitrag: 113
- Oberwinkl: 99
- Pargfried: 79
- Preising: 68
- Ramersdorf: 38
- Schwarzendorf: 47
- Stratreith: 194
- Unterweitrag: 127
- Weignersedt: 38
- Wildberg: 2
- Willersdorf: 104
- Windpassing: 87
- Würschendorf: 41

== Notable people ==
- Christina Stürmer (* 1982), Singer and songwriter
- Sonja Horner, winner of the Miss Austria beauty contest in 1996.
