= Michael Hammer (politician) =

Austrian politician (born 1977)

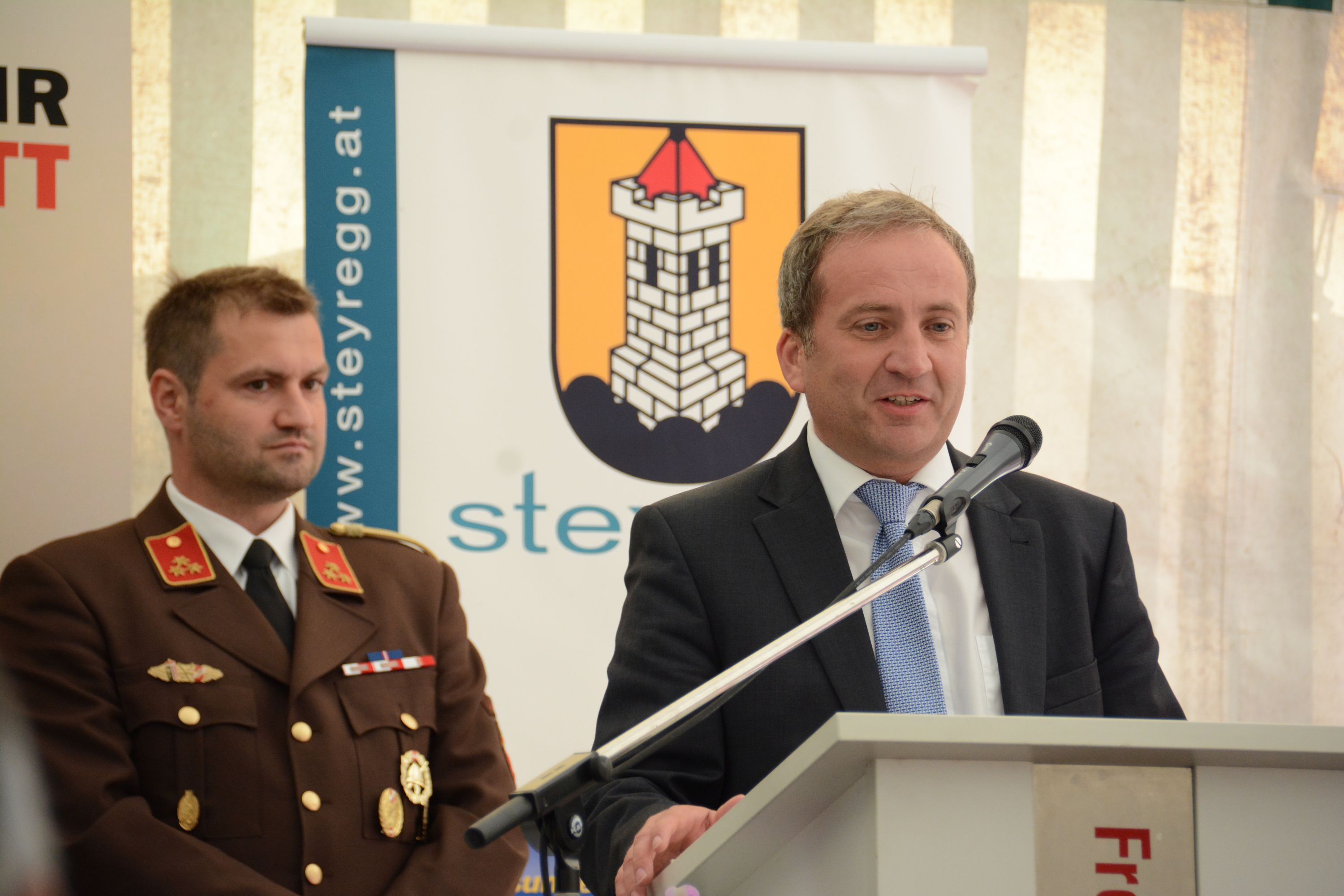
- Hammer in 2019

Member of the National Council
- Incumbent
- Assumed office 22 March 2011
- Preceded by: Norbert Kapeller
- Constituency: Mühlviertel (2011–2013, 2013–present); Upper Austria (2013)

Personal details
- Born: 3 June 1977 (age 48)
- Party: People's Party

Michael Hammer (born 3 June 1977) is an Austrian politician of the People's Party. He has been a member of the National Council since 2011, and has served as mayor of Altenberg bei Linz since 2020. From 2009 to 2011, he was a member of the Federal Council. Hammer belongs to the neoliberal faction within the OeVP.
