= Anneliese Kitzmüller =

Austrian politician (born 1959)

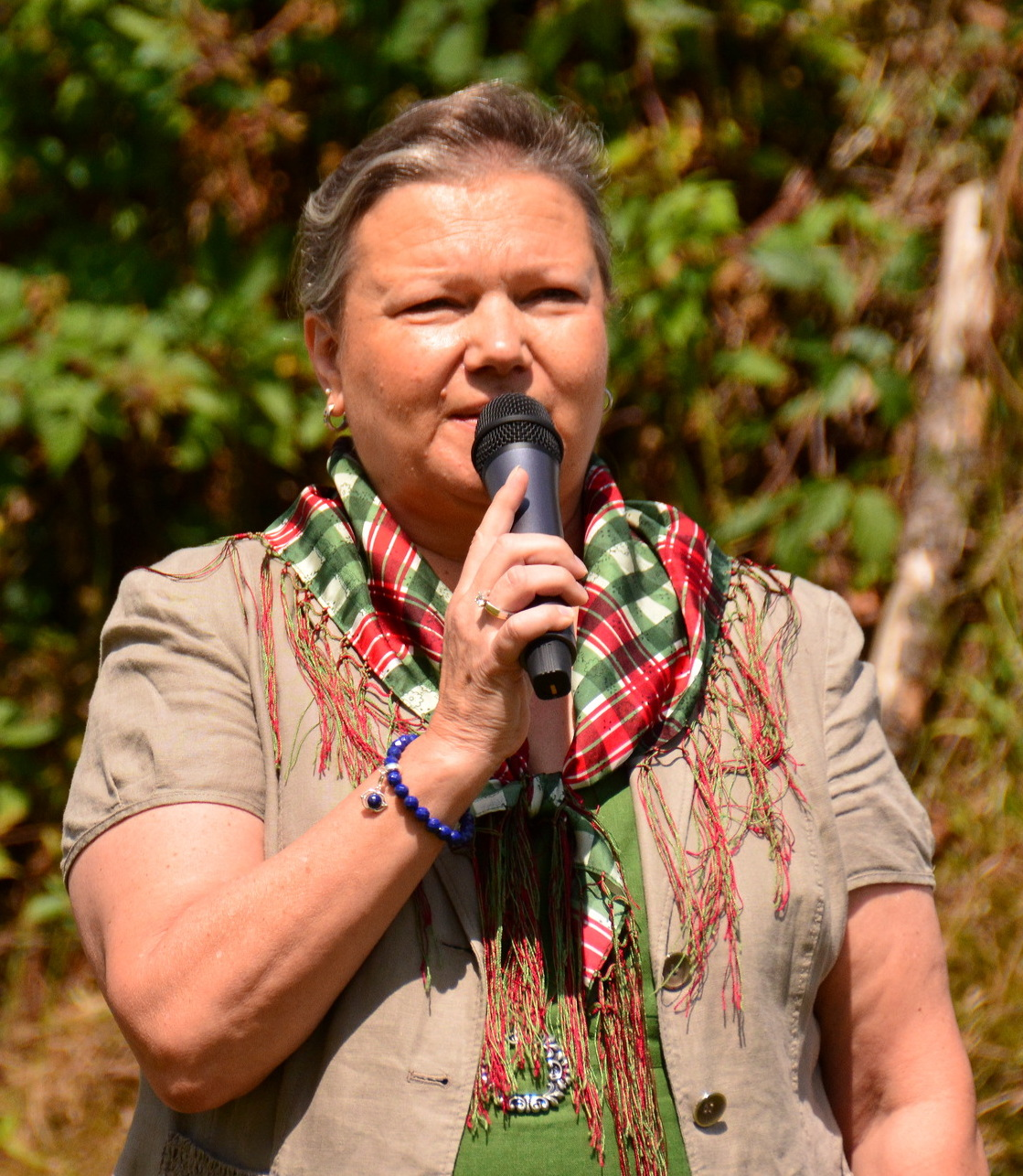

Third President of the National Council
- In office 20 December 2017 – 23 October 2019
- President: Wolfgang Sobotka
- Preceded by: Norbert Hofer
- Succeeded by: Norbert Hofer

Personal details
- Born: 3 July 1959 (age 66)
- Party: Freedom Party

Anneliese Kitzmüller (born 3 July 1959) is an Austrian politician who has been a Member of the National Council for the Freedom Party of Austria (FPÖ) since 2008. From December 2017 to October 2019, she was the Third President of the Austrian National Council.
